= Södertälje =

City in Södermanland, Sweden

- City
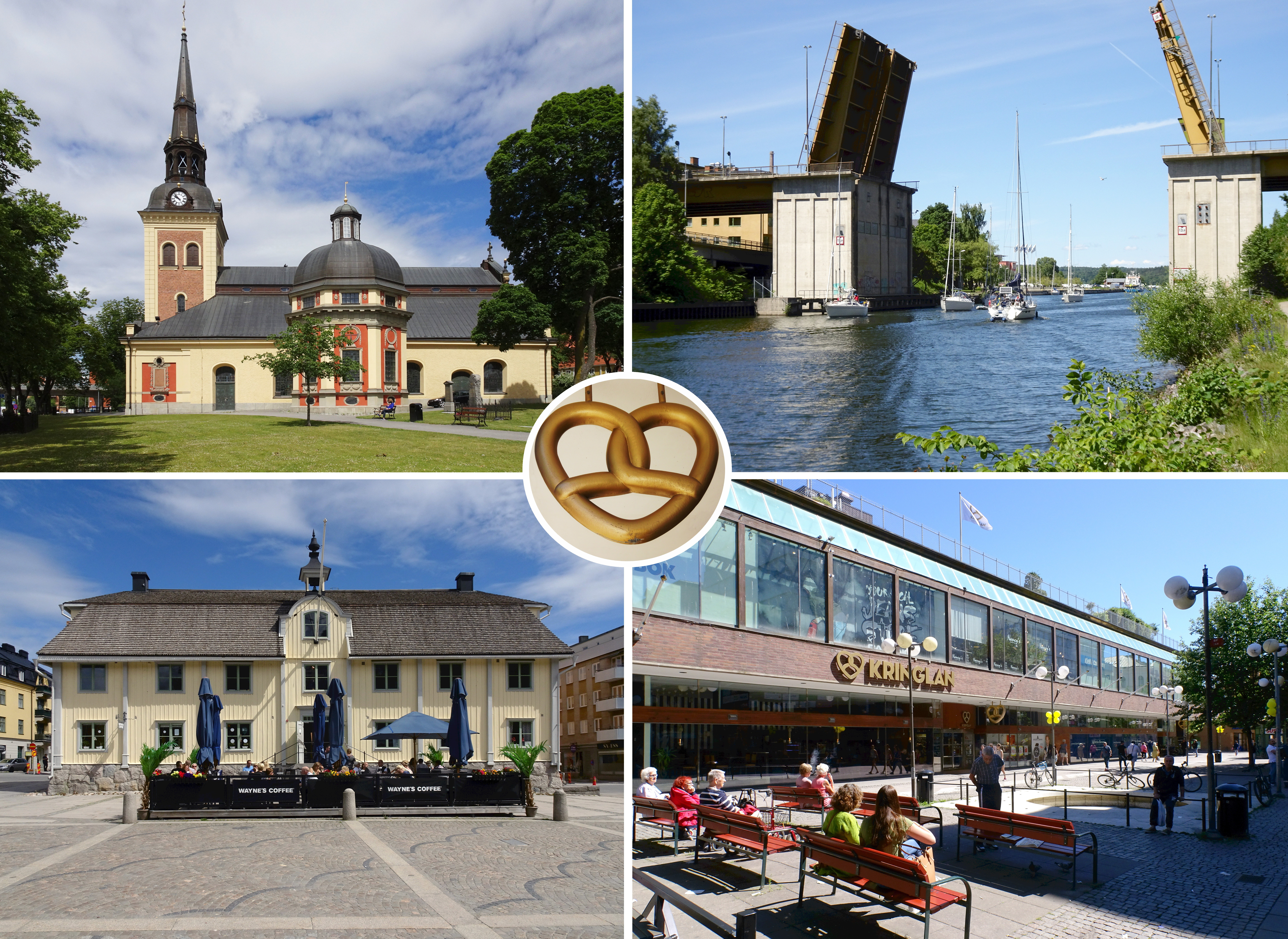
- Sankta Ragnhild church, Mälarbron bridge, Old city hall, Storgatan street

- Coat of arms
- Nickname: City of Pretzels
- Location within Stockholm Location within Sweden Location within European Union
- Coordinates: 59°11′45″N 17°37′41″E
- Country: Sweden
- Province: Södermanland
- County: Stockholm County
- Municipality: Södertälje Municipality
- Founded: 1300s

Area
  - Total: 28.51 km^{2} (11.01 sq mi)
- Elevation: 23 m (75 ft)

Population (31 December 2020)
  - Total: 73,872
  - Density: 2,591/km^{2} (6,711/sq mi)
- Time zone: UTC+1 (CET)
  - Summer (DST): UTC+2 (CEST)
- Postal code: 151xx
- Area code: (+46) 08
- Website: www.sodertalje.se

Södertälje (/ˌsɜːrdərˈtɛljə, ˌsʌd-/ SU(R)D-ər-TEL-yə, Swedish: [sœdɛˈʈɛ̂lːjɛ]) is a city in Stockholm County, Sweden and seat of Södertälje Municipality. It is also a part of Greater Stockholm Metropolitan Area. As of 2020, it has 73,872 inhabitants. Södertälje is located at Mälarens confluence in to the Baltic Sea through the lock in the Södertälje Canal. The canal has the largest ship lock in the Nordic region. Since year 2000, it is the largest city located entirely within the province of Södermanland.

== History ==
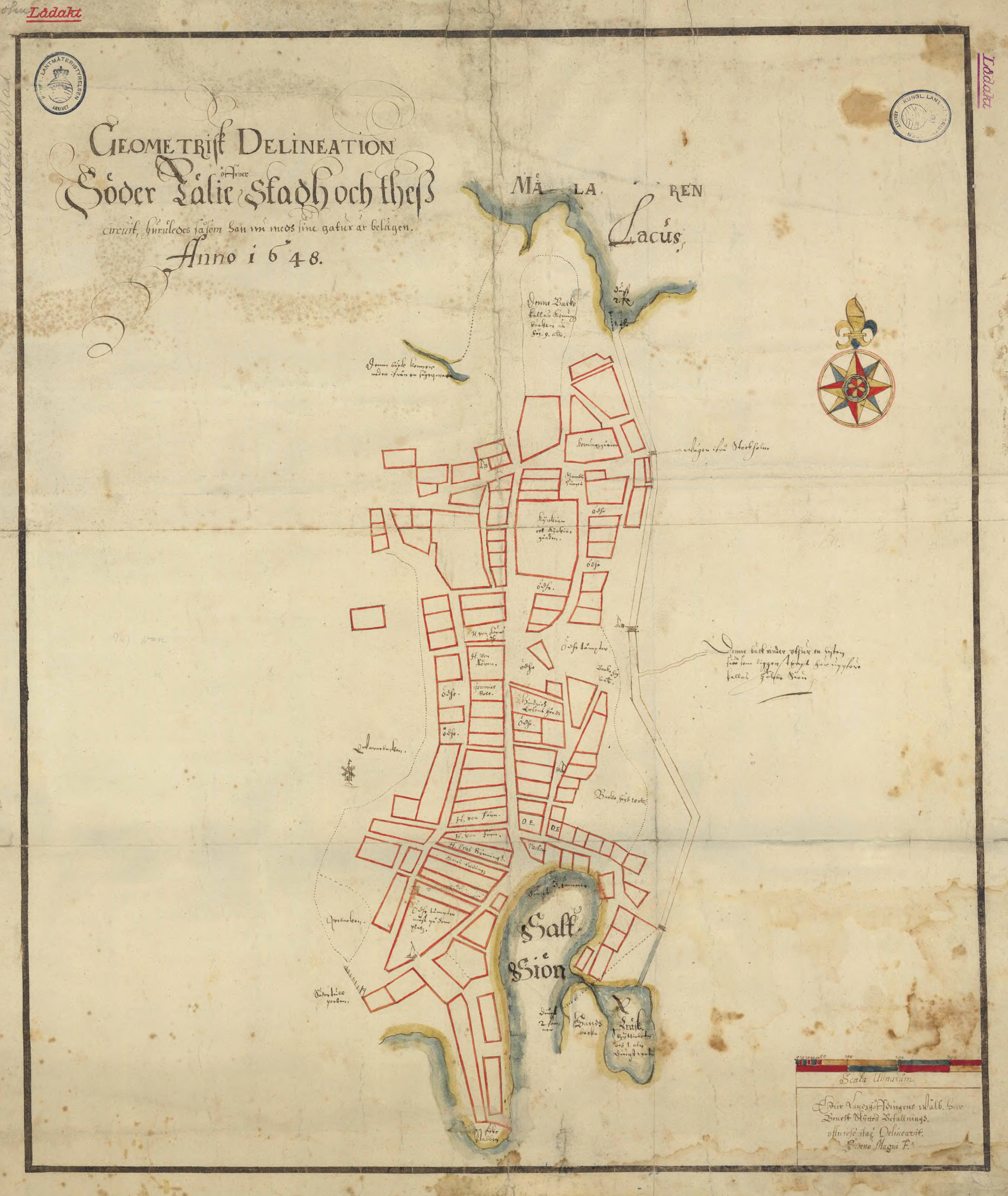
Map of Södertälje from 1648

=== Ancient history ===
It is estimated that the first people reached the area around what is today Södertälje during the Stone Age, about 4000 BC. They formed settlements around 3000 BC, when the peasant culture is believed to have reached the area. Around 1500 to 400 BC, the strait between Lake Mälaren and the Baltic Sea narrowed due to the post-glacial rebound. Thereafter boats had to be towed over the sand ridge, which created job opportunities. Trade and service emerged.

Ansgar passed through Södertälje on his voyages to Birka in his efforts to Christianize Sweden in 829. Södertälje was first mentioned in historical sources in 1070, when Adam of Bremen mentioned the town in a description of the road between Skara and Birka in his work Gesta Hammaburgensis Ecclesiae pontificum. However, the area was inhabited long before then. Södertälje received city privileges in the 1300s.

The castle Telge Hus was built at Slottsholmen during the 1300s. From here, Telgehus county was administered between the years 1318 and 1527. The county included Öknebo, Hölebo and parts of Svartlösa districts. Archaeological excavations have shown that the castle was surrounded by a moat. It is still partially visible on Slottsholmen's northwestern shore.

Originally, the city was simply called Tälje (several spellings are known; including Telge, Talje, and Tælga). In 1622, the prefix Söder 'south' was added to distinguish from the then recently founded town of Norrtälje, located 110 km northeast of the city. Statistics Sweden started using the modern spelling in 1900.

The city first used St. Olof in its coat of arms. At the beginning of the 17th century, he was replaced by Ragnhild of Tälje (Swedish: Sankta Ragnhild). After her pilgrimages to Rome and Jerusalem, her relics are said to have been buried in Södertälje.

Duke Charles (Who subsequently became King Charles) actively invested in Södertälje as a commercial and maritime city during his time as Duke of Södermanland, which contributed to growth. A port was built just south of the city. It was not until the 1740s that the city began with industrial manufacturing in addition to shipping and trade.

=== 1800s to 1950 ===
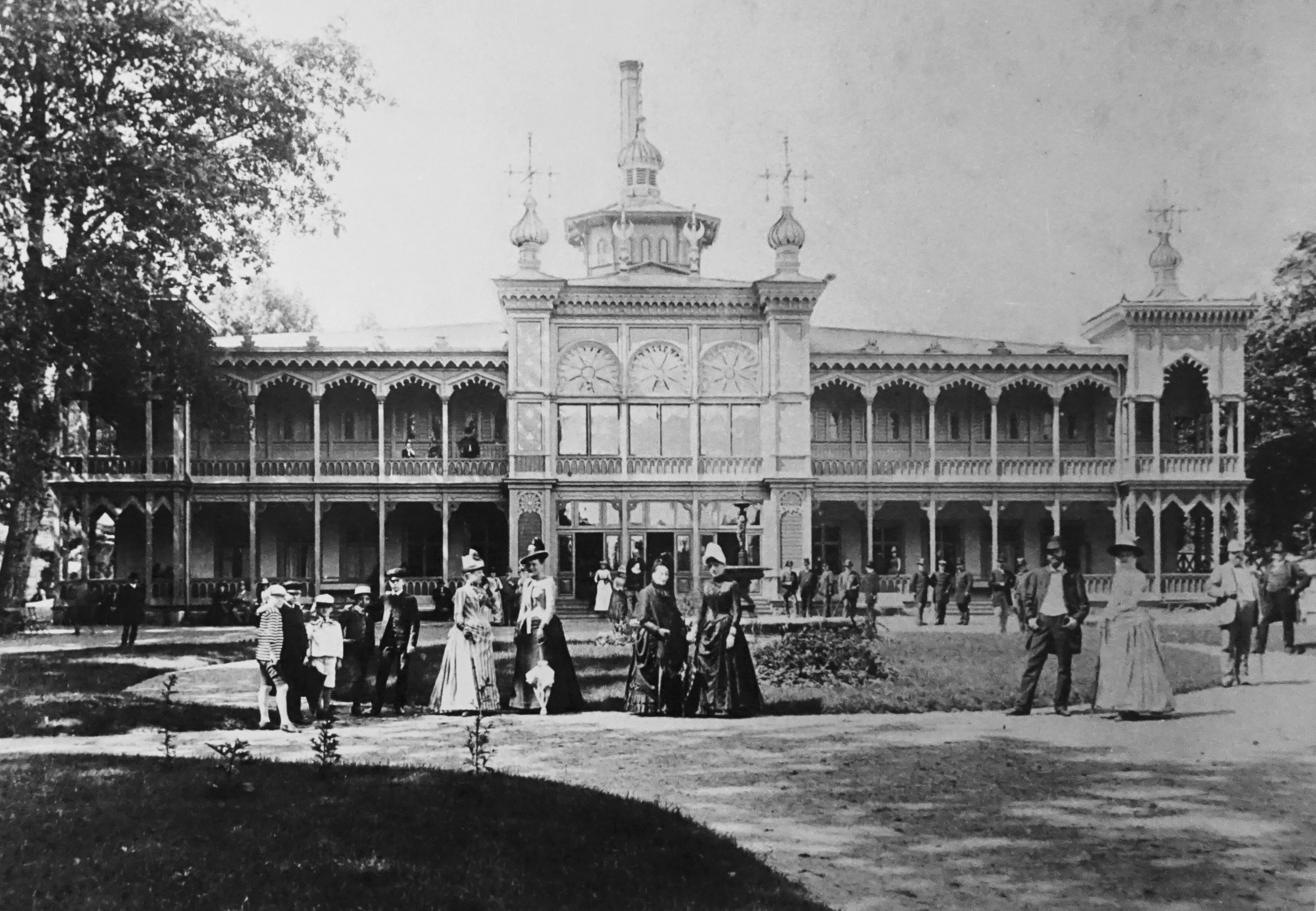
Old Bath House during the seaside resort era. Photo from 1880s

Södertälje already had a port, but during the 19th century it became necessary to extend it to be able to receive larger vessels. In 1819 the Södertälje Canal was inaugurated after 13 years of construction. Just over forty years later, in 1860, rail traffic between Södertälje and Stockholm commenced. The Western Main Line for trains between the east and west coast of Sweden opened in 1862, with a station in the city.

Around this time Södertälje became known as a seaside resort for Stockholmers. In 1849 the Södertälje Bathing Facilities in Badparken park was opened, with both a cold bath facility and a hot bath house. The bathhouses and the Societetshus venue have been demolished, but the Bath hotel at Järnagatan street, Strandhotellet hotel, Stadsparken park and Villa Bellevue still remain from the resort era, which lasted for almost a hundred years until 1945.

The tradition of selling the local pretzels, Södertäljekringlor, is several hundred years old. They had their heyday during the resort era, i.e. around the beginning of the 19th century onwards. They were typically sold by older women, often referred to as Kringelgummor (English: Pretzel ladies). The pretzels were primarily sold to tourists, especially at the city's railway stations. The sale of pretzels, among other aspects of the resort town, was described in the magazine Svenska Familj-Journalen (English: Swedish Family Journal) in 1881.

By the 1900s, Södertälje's population had grown to over 8,000 people. Around the turn of the century several large factories were established in the city: Svenska Centrifug AB (1896), AB Södertelge Verkstäder (1897), Baltic (1906), Aktiebolaget Astra Apotekarnes Kemiska Fabriker (Astra) (1913), Tobaksmonopolet (1915) och Wedaverken (1917). Perhaps most interesting is the formation of VABIS, Vagnfabriks-Aktiebolaget in Södertelge (1891). In 1911 it merged with Scania and formed Scania-Vabis. Nowadays, however, the company only uses the name Scania AB.

=== From 1950 until today ===
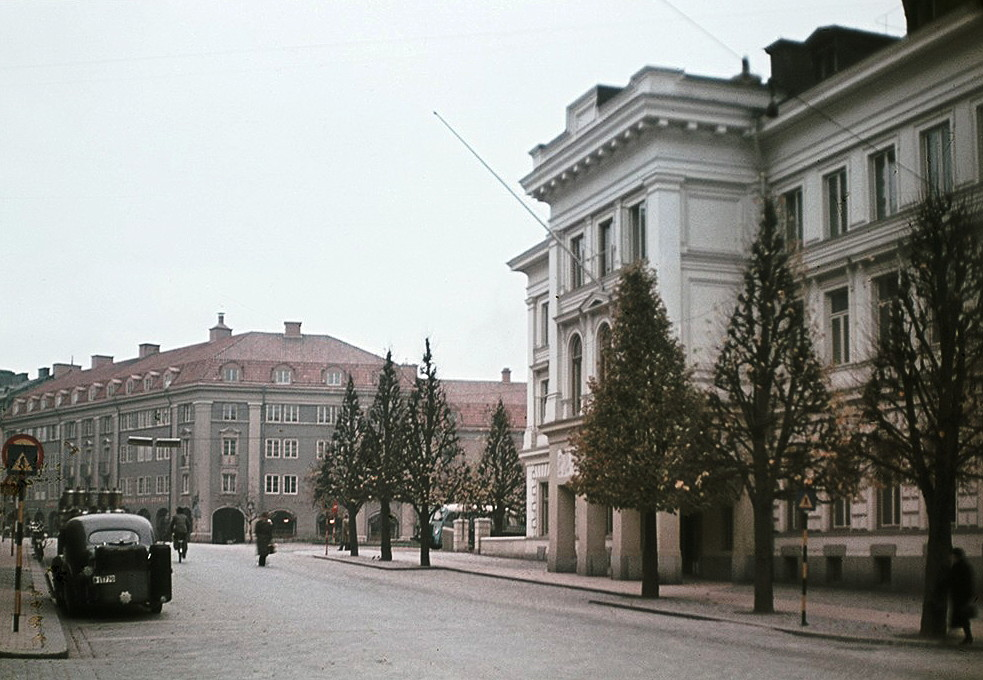
Järnagatan street in the city centre 1944

In the 1950s, conditions in Södertälje's centre consisted of relatively small wooden residential houses. As the city grew, modern apartment buildings were constructed in the outskirts. The municipal government introduced a major renovation of the central areas, during which many buildings around the pedestrian section of Storgatan high street, including adjacent Nygatan and Köpmangatan streets, were demolished. Some of the buildings were moved to the Torekällberget City Museum. However, many of the 17th–19th century buildings around Olof Palmes plats, Marenplan, Saltsjötorget and Stortorget were preserved.

In 1960, Södertälje was still a fairly small town with a largely homogeneous population of 33,000 inhabitants. In the 1960s, however, the demographics of the city changed radically as a result of rapid industrial development. Large companies such as Scania-Vabis and Astra increased the demand for labour which initially came from Norrland. When domestic sources of manpower declined, foreign labour was brought in. Most of the migrant workers came from Finland, but also Greece, Italy and Yugoslavia.

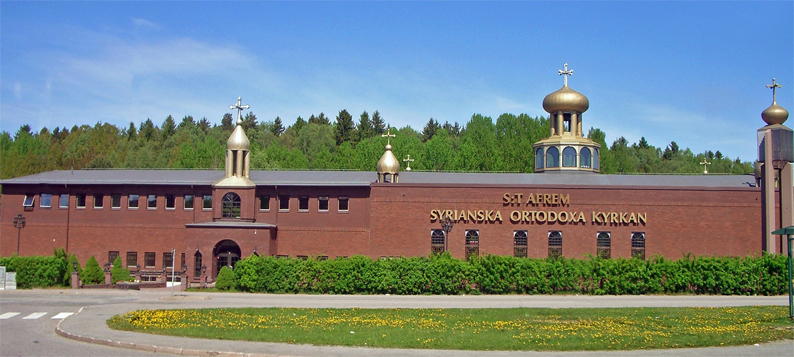
Syriac Orthodox Church St. Aphrem Cathedral, Södertälje

During the 1970s, immigration from Finland declined, while many Christian Assyrians/Syriacs settled in Södertälje, mostly from Tur Abdin, Turkey. At the end of the 1990s, many Iraqis arrived, as well as Finnish and Syrian people. In 2013, there were reports in the media that a parallel society founded by Assyrian/Syriac minorities had emerged, with norms, rules and a banking system outside the control of the Swedish state, and which included illegal activity. Extensive resources were allocated to law enforcement. Charges were brought against the mafia-like organisation Södertäljenätverket (the Södertälje network) resulting in a criminal trial which ended in 2013.

Södertälje also has a growing population of about 1,500 Mandaeans, most of Iraqi origin.

Construction of Almnäs garrison began in 1970. Svea Engineer Corps and the Engineering Troops Cadet School (INGKAS) relocated to Almnäs. They were joined by Swedint, the Armed Forces International training school, in 1984. During the 1990s, the Life Guards were also present at Almnäs. After 1996, the armed forces underwent a major reorganisation and left Almnäs altogether in 2004. The area is now a business park.

Many of the city's modern attractions were built in the 1980s. A museum based on the book La Science Amusante by French writer Arthur Good was built. The museum is called Tom Tits Experiment after the author's pen name Tom Tit. The new bath house Sydpoolen opened in 1987, and is now one of the most visited bathing facilities in the country. During the 2010 and 2020 centuries, several infrastructure projects were completed or started. Further widening of the canal and the lock was initiated, as well as the upgrade of the railway around Södertälje hamn railway station to increase capacity.

=== Administrative history ===
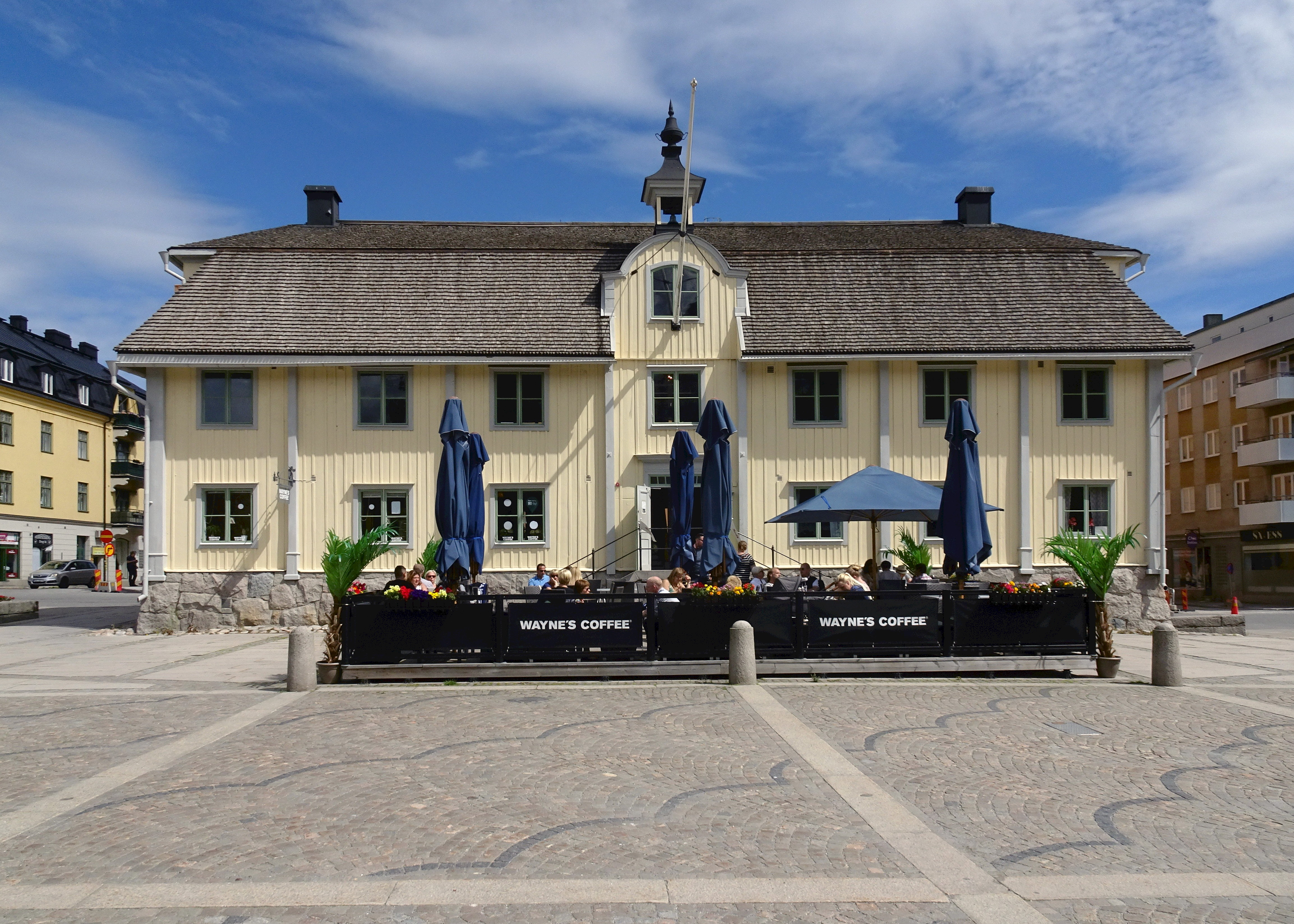
The old City Hall was built in 1734

The City of Södertälje was transformed to a city municipality during the Swedish municipal reforms of 1862. The city grew and subsequently incorporated Västertälje parish in 1946 and Östertälje parish in 1963. The city municipality expanded further in 1967, until it became the seat of the present-day Södertälje Municipality.

Within the Church of Sweden, Södertälje was part of Södertälje City parish. It incorporated the western part of Södertälje landsförsamling in 1946, and received the name Södertälje församling (English: Södertälje parish). It has since also incorporated the parish of Tveta. Between 1973 and 2010, part of the city was part of Västertälje parish. The eastern part of Södertälje still belongs to Östertälje parish.

Until 1971, the city belonged to the judicial district Södertälje Council Court. In 1971, it was changed to Södertälje District Court.

=== Historical population figures ===
Population and Area Development
Year	Population	Area (ha)
1950	25 715	
1960	33 721	
1965	44 362	
1970	57 494	
1975	58 408	
1980	58 711	
1990	58 097	2 408
1995	57 327	2 456
2000	59 342	2 479
2005	60 279	2 529
2010	64 619	2 584
2015	70 777	2 797
2018	73 872	2 851

== Cityscape ==
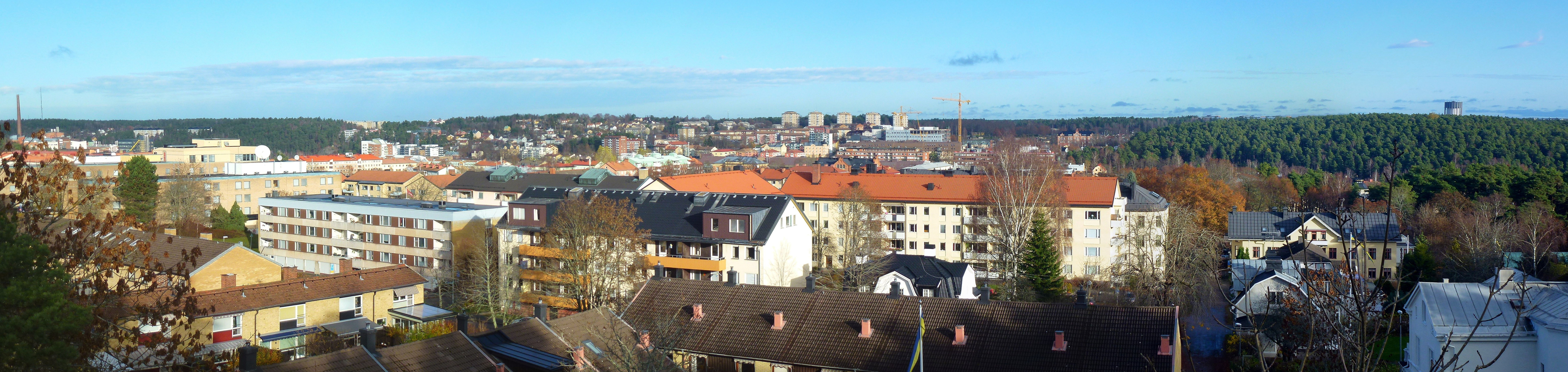
Panorama of Södertälje from Torekällberget

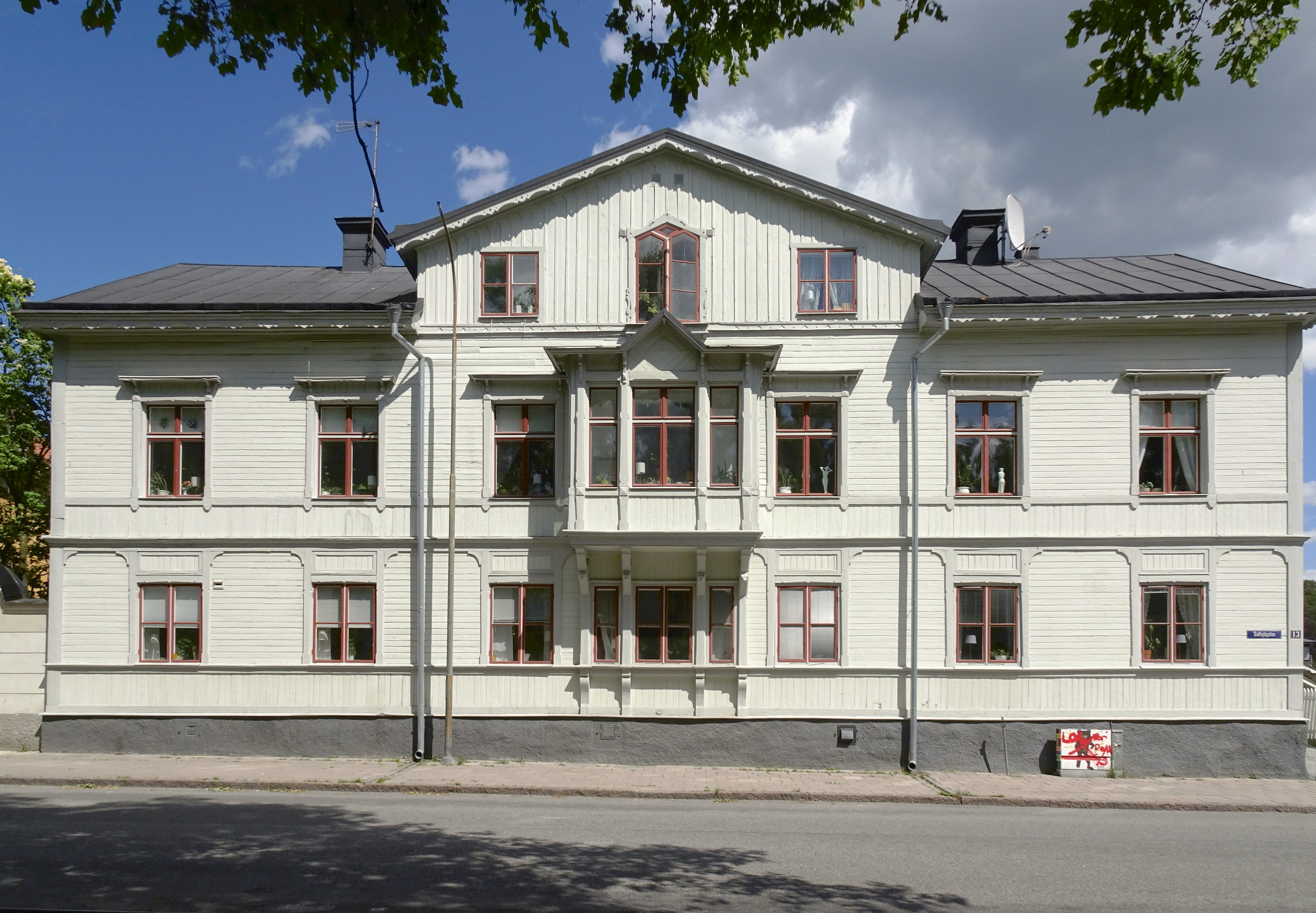
The property Skytten 2 (at Strandgatan 13) built in 1854 is one of the city's oldest wooden multi-family residential buildings

During the 1600s, the city was hit by two major fires; in 1630 and 1650. After the fire in 1650, the devastation was vast. All important buildings except the church were destroyed; including the school and town hall. After the fires, extensive urban planning was implemented under the leadership of Anders Torstensson, where the old irregular medieval neighbourhoods were replaced by a grid plan of streets. The 1650s plan remained largely in place until the redevelopment of the city centre in the 1960s, and still characterises many parts of the central areas. Most of the older buildings have disappeared due to city fires or demolition.

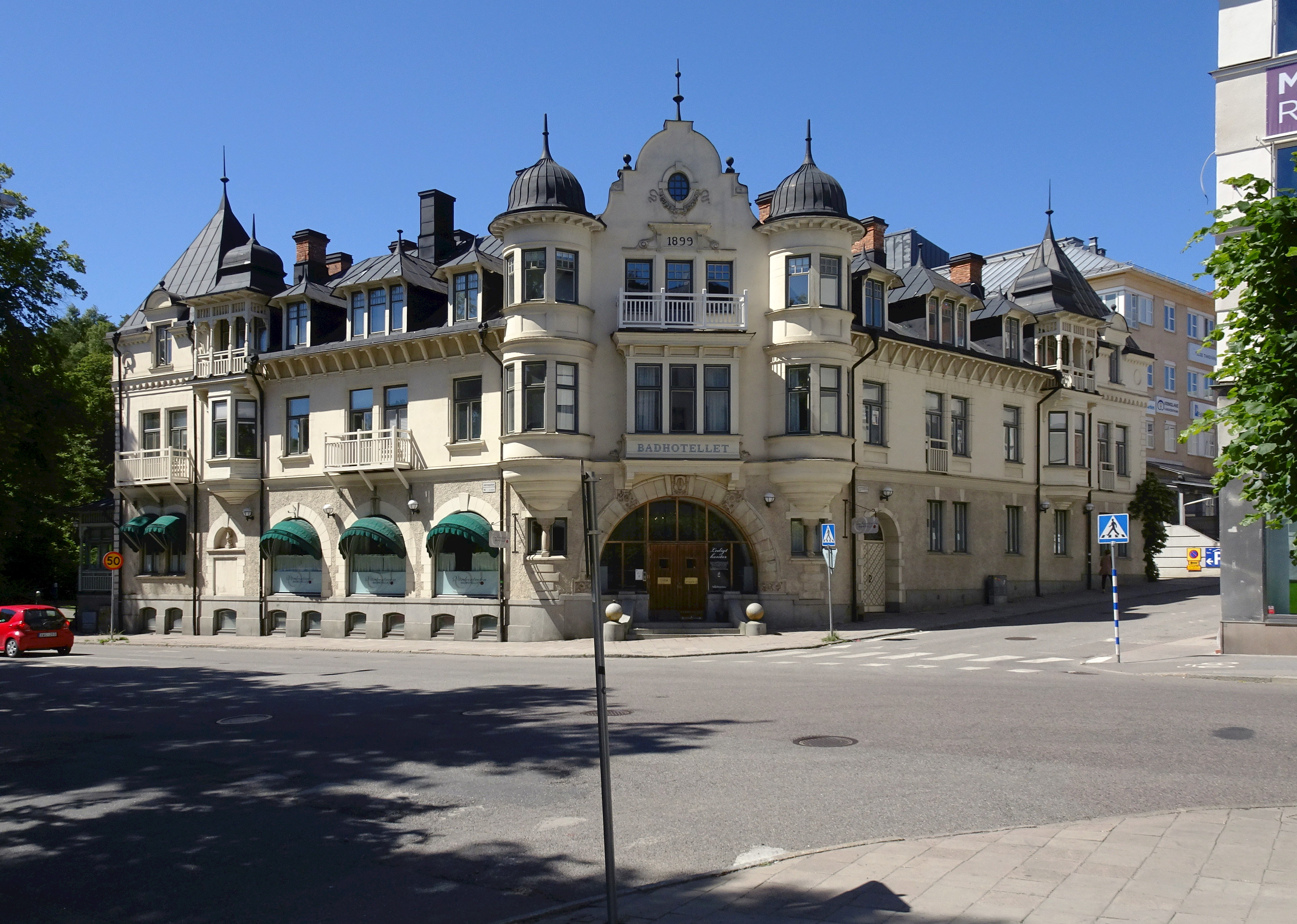
The Badhotellet resort hotel at Järnagatan street opened in 1899

The central parts of Södertälje are today mainly the neighbourhood around what is commonly referred to as called Gågatan, which is the pedestrian part of Storgatan street. Stortorget was originally the absolute centre of the city. The reason that the area would subsequently expand (mainly in a southerly direction) is largely due to the fact that the Central Railway Station was placed near the city park. Unlike most other cities in the country, no railroad has ever been drawn through Södertälje's central parts, which meant that very little central area had to be designated for tracks. Another interesting detail is that the old Södertälje largely consisted of wooden houses. It is commonly believed that this is because Södertälje never has been a major administrative centre, such as a county capital or episcopal see. For a trade city, it wooden structures were considered sufficient. The original wooden buildings are especially well preserved in the areas around Fredsgatan and Västgötagatan streets. The older wooden houses that previously existed in the central parts have largely been moved up to Torekällberget, which is Södertälje's open-air city museum. The first apartment building in stone was built as late as 1865. The property was at Järnagatan 8, next to Saltsjötorget square, and was built by industrialist DJ Ekeberg. When Järnagatan was lowered in 1907, the basement level became the areas that are occupied by shops today.

Södertälje's old City Hotel is situated on Saltsjötorget square. It was built to accommodate the high demand for rooms that arose during the time the city was a seaside resort. The City council decided to commission a new hotel on the site. Architect Ernst Haegglund was hired to design the building. The square also houses the old building for Svensk-Engelska Mineralolje AB, which was completed between 1931 and 1932 after drawings by architect Albin Stark. Between 1991 and 2008, the building served as city hall. The current city hall was built on the opposite side of the central station. The new building was designed by BSK Arkitekter, and inaugurated in the autumn of 2008 by King Carl XVI Gustaf. The building serves both as municipal offices and cultural centre.

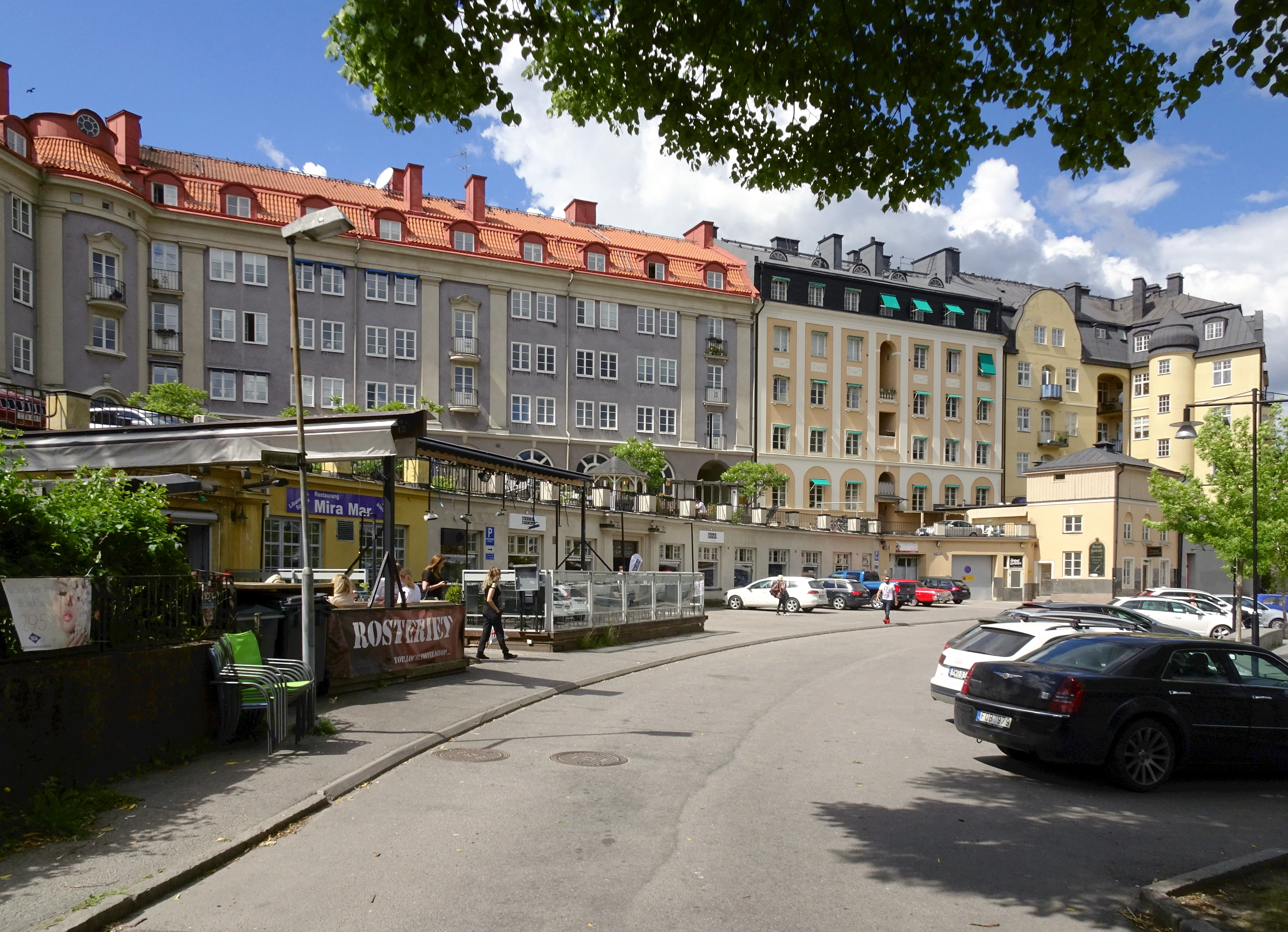
Strandgatan street with several large residential buildings drawn by Tore E:son Lindhberg in the 1920s

The Central Railway Station is situated behind the City Hotel. It is one of few Swedish railway stations with two station houses. The first building is entirely in brick, and was designed in 1860 by Adolf W. Edelsvärd. The yellow station building was added in the 1910s and was designed by Folke Zettervall. Today, only the yellow building is used for ticket sales. The older station house is occupied by a bar, café and convenience store. The open square between the two station houses, the bus station and the railway tracks is called Stationsplan.

To the west of the station, across Järnagatan lies Villa Bellevue. During the era when Södertälje was a seaside resort, it was one of the city's most notable buildings. It was built in 1871 by the royal pastry chef Davidsson, after drawings by architect Ernst Jacobsson. The new city hall is situated next-door to the property. Villa Bellevue is located on the border between the city centre and the centrally located neighbourhood of Mariekälla, which is named after one of the city's water springs. On Parkgatan, which is a parallel street to the district's main street Mariekällgatan, lies Villa Walhall. The villa was built in 1875 by engineer Ludvig Jerving. Villa Walhall and Villa Bellevue were considered so typical of the resort town Södertälje that they were described and depicted in a series of articles in the magazine Svenska Familj-Journalen in 1881.

Most restaurants and bars are located around Lake Maren. Marenplan square (formerly called Stadshamnen port), served as Södertälje's most important port until the construction of Mälarhamnen port in 1880. When Marenplan served as city port, ships carrying goods would moor there, and sell their merchandise to individuals and traders waiting at the quay. Boat traffic to inner Maren continued until 1963, when the Maren Bridge between Strandgatan and Lotsudden was built. The bridge was only intended as a temporary solution, and became demolished in 1993. The Maren Bridge subsequently replaced a pedestrian and bicycle bridge. The initial plan was to have the bridge removed during the summer months to allow boats to moor in inner Maren seasonally. The bridge subsequently became year-round fixed link. The Sorbonne house lies where Lotsudden and Marenplan meet. It was built in 1905, and served as studio for photographer David Sorbon until 1928. The building was completely renovated in 1985–86, to accommodate several residential apartments and a restaurant.

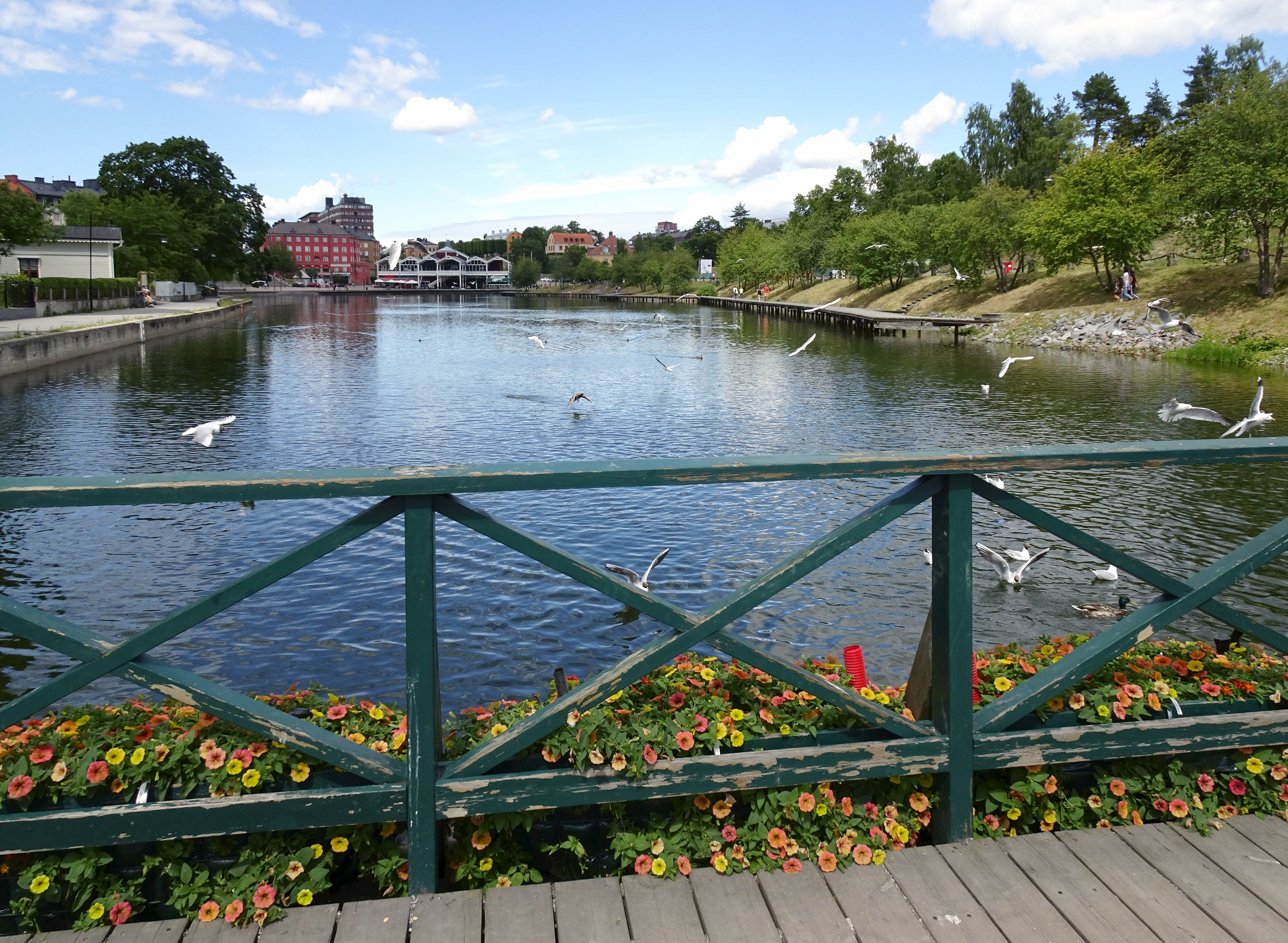
Lake Maren is prominent in the city centre

Just above Marenplan lies the square Olof Palmes plats, which was named after the murdered Prime Minister Olof Palme. Among the buildings on the square is the old bank palace that used to belong to Södertälje Sparbank. Like many other buildings in Södertälje, the city's patron saint Ragnhild of Tälje (Swedish: Sankta Ragnhild) is depicted on the facade. The importance of Olof Palmes plats was especially high when it served as hub for the city buses, which have since been moved to the Central Railway Station. The streets Storgatan, Badhusgatan and Järnagatan begin at Olof Palmes plats.

Most department stores and high street shopping are located on Gågatan (English: the Pedestrian street), which is the pedestrian part of Storgatan that runs between Torekällgatan and Stortorget. The pedestrian street is dominated by modern department stores, built during the 1960s. The largest are Kringlan (architect Erik and Tore Ahlsén), Luna, Åhléns and Telgehuset (which initially was a Domus department store). A notable exception to the otherwise modern structures is Skandinaviska Enskilda Bankens bank palace, which was built between 1901 and 1902 at the initiative of the tobacco trader TH. Gustafsson. The local architect Tore E: son Lindhberg made the drawings. In 1939, the facade was modernized, and subsequently restored when the building was completely renovated in 1975.

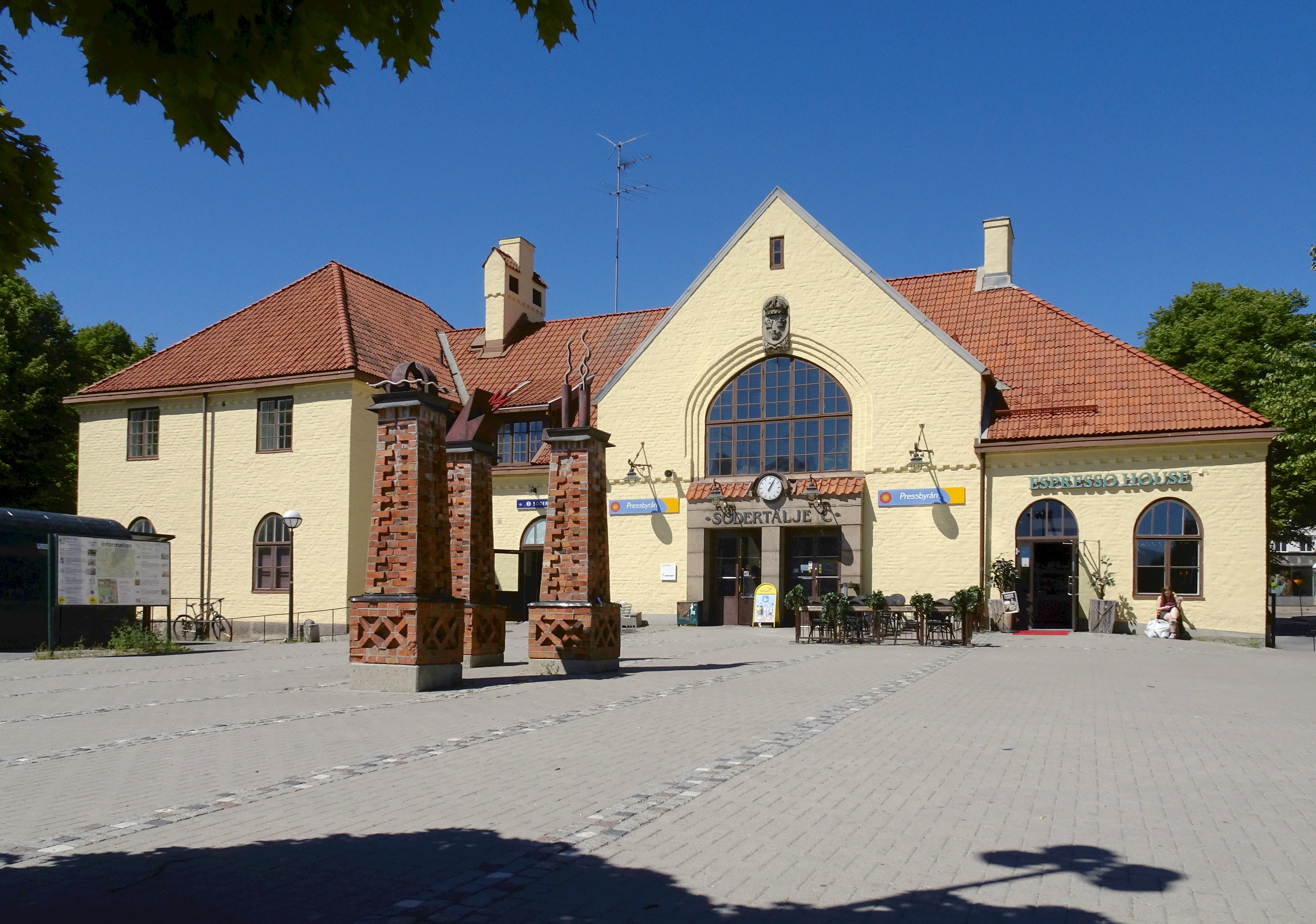
The yellow station building at the Central Railway Station was drawn by Folke Zettervall and opened in 1918

The hospital on Orionkullen was built 1777–78. Until 1823, the building served as lazaretto of the Royal Order of the Seraphim. After 1823, the building became a private residence. From 1844, the buildings were used as city hall and for higher education. In 1907 the council administration moved from Orionkullen, allowing the educational institution to expand. As the school faculty moved to the new secondary school building at Erik Dahlberg's road, a girls' school moved in. The girls' school at Orionkullen closed in 1968. The building is home to a cultural centre today.

The area where the secondary school moved is east of the canal, the Museum of Biology and the present day city hospital. After the 1960s upper secondary school reform, the institution became a Gymnasium Secondary school. Close to the school lies Mälarparken, which is home to the professional Miniature golf course. They local team has won several championships. The city council offices were also located by the park before moving to the intersection of Nygatan/Torekällgatan. Södertälje's current hospital is across the street from the secondary school. It houses one of the county's six trauma centres. It opened in 1907, but has been expanded and renovated on several occasions, most recently in 2017.

As the land post-glacial rebound made Södertälje Canal shallower, it became increasingly difficult for merchants to get between Lake Mälaren and the Baltic Sea to sell their goods. It was decided to build a square in Södertälje, where they could meet to and hold markets. The location of the square was carefully selected so it would be located equidistant between the city's ports at Baltic Sea and Lake Mälaren. This way, merchants did not have to drag their goods longer than was absolutely necessary. The main square in Södertälje is thus not primarily designed as a trading place for the city's inhabitants themselves. For hundreds of years, Stortorget was very important because of the lively square trade held there. At that time, Stortorget was regarded as the city's centremost place. In modern times, when most trade is conducted in stores, the importance of the square has diminished. Marenplan has increasingly taken over the role as the most central location in the city. The most famous building on Stortorget is perhaps the old yellow wooden City Hall building, which was opened in 1735. The City Hall originally stood on the west side of the square. It was temporarily relocated to Västra Kanalgatan during the redevelopment of the city centre in the 1960s. Since 1982, the City Hall has been in its present location. Today it houses art galleries and a café. Across the square lies the current Södertälje District Court, which was designed by Åke Lindqvist, and built by Anders Diös.

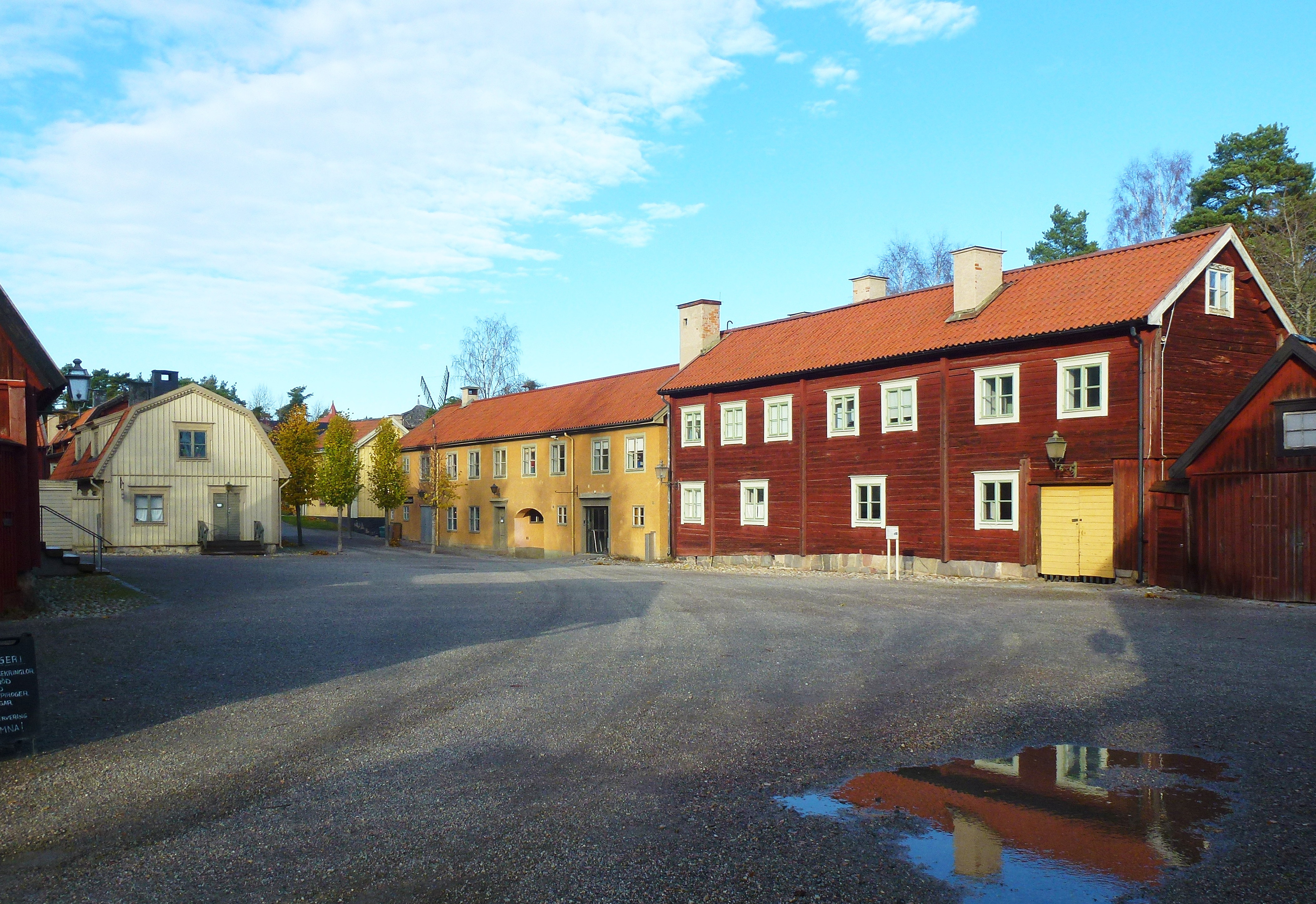
Tenngjutartorget square with the Wetterholmska building (the red house) at Torekällberget

On the northern side of Stortorget square is Sankta Ragnhilds Kyrka (English: Church of Ragnhild of Tälje) from the 1100s–1300s. It is the main church in Södertälje parish in the Diocese of Strängnäs. After many renovations, the church is today a large building with three arches. The oldest parts consist of grey brick walls that comprise the lower parts of the bell tower and the two westernmost compartments of the longhouse. Renovations were made after the city fire in 1650. Further additions were made in the 1670s, when the Cronberg-Hackerska choir in the middle of the southern wall. It was probably designed by Erik Dahlbergh, and is now used as a baptismal chapel. During the fires during the Russian Pillage of 1719–21, it was one of few buildings that survived. A major restoration under the direction of architect B. Romare took place between 1960 and 1961. A few years after this, two of the windows next to the baptismal chapel received new stained glass windows by F. Heybrock. The exterior of the church was repaired in 1986–1987, with the facades partially receiving their current colour scheme.

Above Stortorget and Gågatan lies Nygatan street, which is almost exclusively home to modern buildings. Among them, Roxyhuset (English: the Roxy house) is worth mentioning. The building was designed by architect Björn Hedvall, and was completed in 1939. Its lower level housed a cinema until 1992, when it moved to Lunagallerian on Storgatan street. After this, the Roxy House was partially renovated, and a convenience store, restaurant and nightclub moved in. Nygatan street is also home to Södertälje's old Telegraph station. It was built 1939–1940, after drawings by U. Ahlbom. Around the time the telegraph station was put into operation, automation of the Swedish telephone network began. The station was subsequently closed after just 30 years. Below the station lies Torekällskolan school. It is the oldest of the city's schools that is still in use. Since its opening in 1869, it has been rebuilt on numerous occasions.

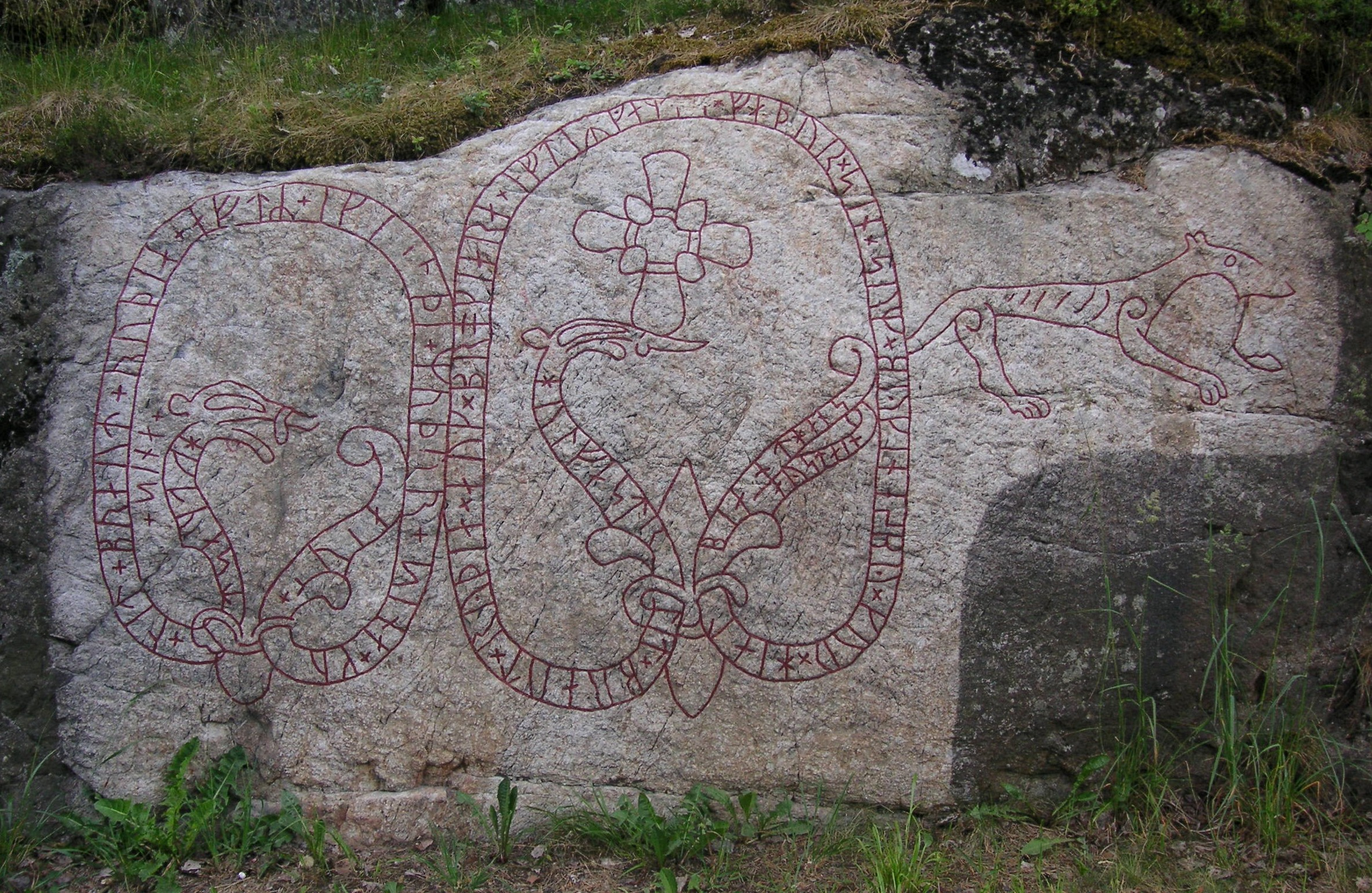
The Holmfast Inscriptions from 1050 to 1080 describe the building of Holmfastvägen road

Holmfastvägen road begins in the city's central parts, and connects to the area Geneta in the western parts of the city. The road originally went all the way to Näsby, next to Lake Måsnaren. It was built during the 11th century, thus marking the early importance of the area around Södertälje. A large runic inscription called the Holmfast Inscriptions (Swedish: Holmfastristningen) describe the construction by Viking Holmfast, including reinforcing the land and building bridges. Archaeologists find it likely that Holmfast's old bridges remain under the roadway. Around the engraving, which is located in close proximity to the road, have today been cleaned up and put up signs from the Swedish National Heritage Board with translations of the inscription.

Retail parks are a fairly new feature in Södertälje. Until the early 2000s, the only really large collection of shops, apart from local neighbourhood centres, was Weda in the eastern part of the city. With the construction of Moraberg köpcentrum, just east of Weda, availability of shops increased. The area around Scaniarinken previously contained some shops, but has subsequently been extended to form Vasa handelsplats. Some shops are also located around Hansaplan in the area Södra, close to Södertälje hamn railway station.

=== Bridges ===
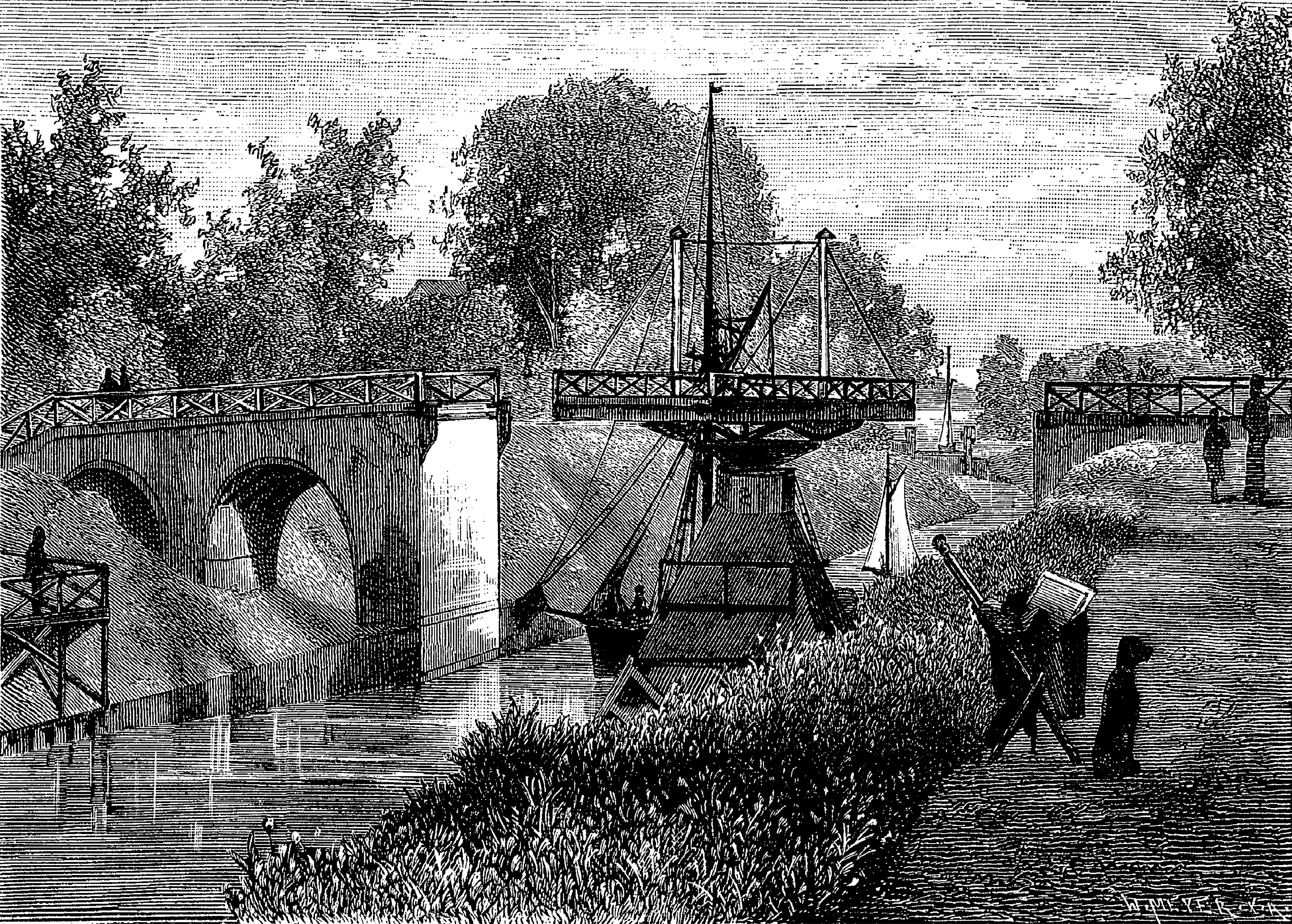
The first swing bridge across Södertälje Canal 1881

Until 1924, when the upgraded canal opened, there was just one single bridge connecting the eastern and western parts of the city. It was a swing bridge, near the old lock, at Mälarehamnen. It was built in 1910 at Södertelge Verkstäder. After it was replaced by a more modern bridge, the old swing bridge was moved to Stäksundet in the province of Uppland.

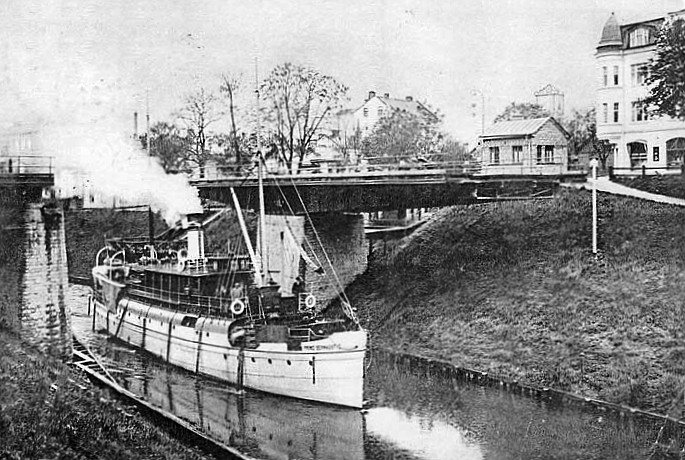
The second swing bridge was in use 1910-1924

At times there was also an iron bridge that was rolled out over the lock itself. It was also possible to use rowing boats to cross. Boat services were usually operated women, predominantly dalkullor. A crossing would cost 2–5 öre, depending on season. The rowing boats could carry up to around five people. At the narrowest place, the distance across was just 12 metres. Embarking by Viksgatan street was especially popular. Many were willing to pay to avoid having to walk to the swing bridge and back again if they lived around the areas of Tältet or Hagaberg. During the winter, simple footbridges supported by pontoons were laid out – making the crossing free of charge.

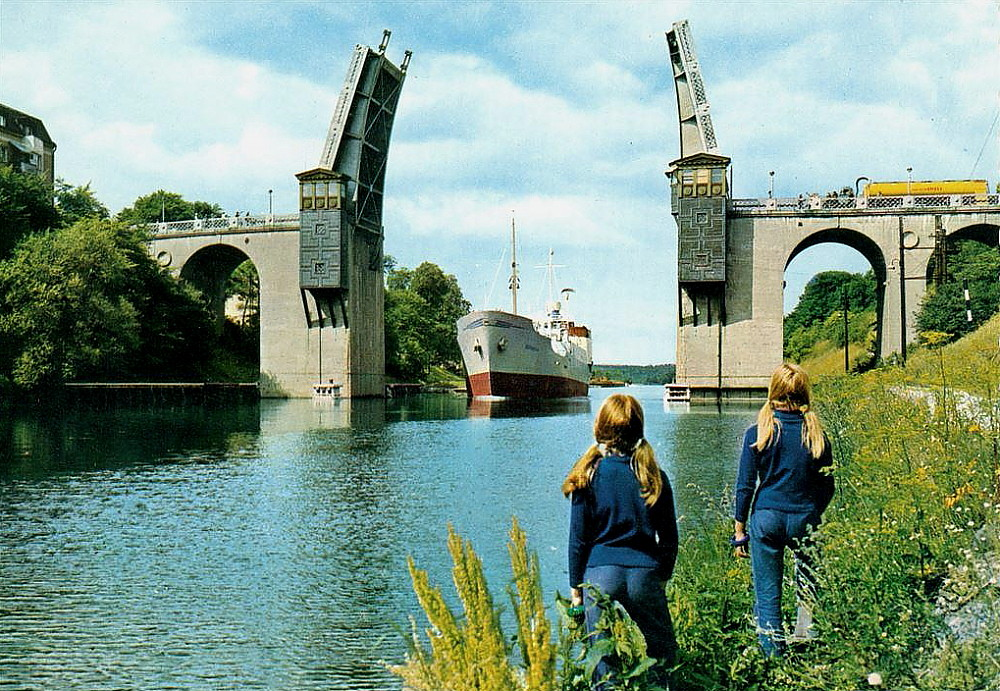
The first bascule bridge was used 1924-1971

There are currently three places where it is possible to cross the canal on foot or by car, plus two railway bridges. The northernmost link is the Mälarbron bridge, which has three predecessors: the swing bridge from the 19th century, and another swing bridge that was used between 1910 and 1924. Both stood about 150 meters south of the current Mälarbron bridge. In 1924, the first bascule bridge opened. It was often referred to as simply Klaffbron or Landsvägsbron (English: "the Bascule bridge" or "the Country Road Bridge"). It was a double flap bridge with two fixed bridge vaults on each side. Ragnar Hjort made the architectural design. After World War II, it could no longer handle the increased traffic volume. Hence, the current Mälarbron was commissioned, and opened in 1971. It is equipped with a control tower. Today the bridge together with the whole route from Landsort in to Mälaren is remote controlled from the locks in Södertälje.

The most central crossing is at the canal lock, and consists of the two bridges Marenbron, which crosses Lake Maren, and Slussbron, which crosses the canal itself. In 1963, the first bridge over the Maren was built. It was intended as a temporary link, and was subsequently demolished in 1993. The Marenbron was later replaced by a pedestrian and bicycle bridge. The initial plan was to have it removed during the summer, allowing small boats to reach the inner parts of the lake. It did however become a year-round fixed link. In September 2003, a referendum among the residents of Södertälje Municipality was held, where they could decide if they wanted a new car bridge to be commissioned at the site. The costs were estimated to 40 million Swedish krona. At the referendum, 56.5 percent voted no and 39.4 percent favourably, meaning no new car bridge was built. Suggestions to build an arch bridge or bascule bridge for pedestrians and cyclists have been brought forward. It would allow boats to pass under and reach the inner parts of Lake Maren in the centremost parts of the city. Pedestrians have also been able to cross the canal itself by walking across the lock gates.

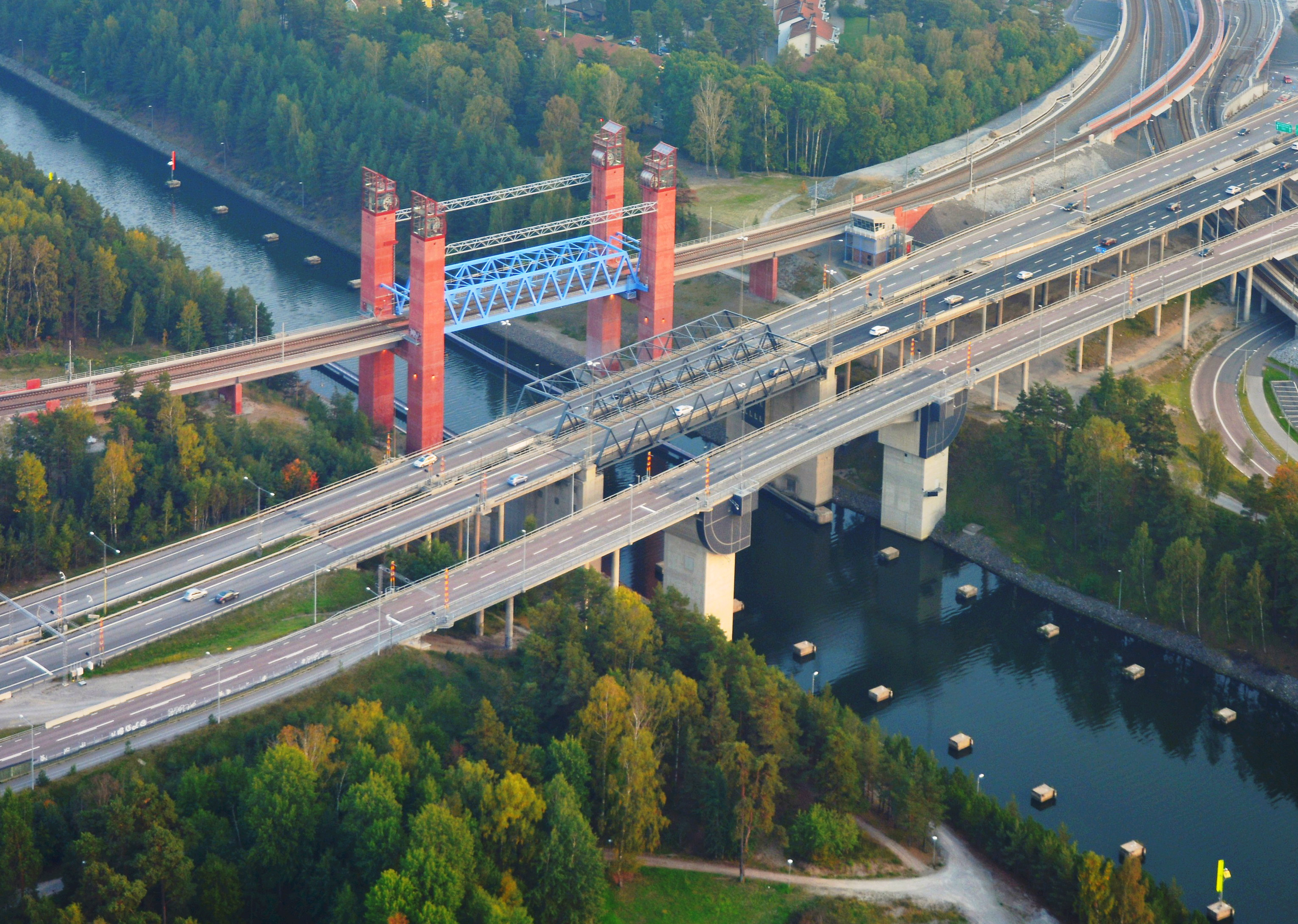
Järnvägsbron, E4-bron and Saltsjöbron bridges

The Saltsjöbron and E4-bron bridges constitute the southernmost crossing for cars and pedestrians. They run between the districts of Södra and Viksängen in Södertälje's southern parts. Saltsjöbron is a bascule bridge, and the road that goes across it is called Viksängsleden. It is equipped with a bicycle and pedestrian path. E4-bron is a vertical-lift bridge, crossed by the eponymous E4 Motorway, and marks the southern fork with E20. It was built in the 1960s, together with the motorways around the city. Saltsjöbron was built in 2002 to relieve the E4-bron, and to provide an alternative in case of mechanical failure after one occurred in 1990.

Parallel to Saltsjöbron and E4-bron lays the railway bridge predominantly used by local and freight trains. It opened in the summer of 2010, and is hence the youngest bridge in the city. It replaced the old railway bridge from 1921, which was located immediately east of the current bridge. The old bridge was replaces as it was unable to handle heavy trains, nor deep-going maritime vessels. It was also too noisy. The distance between the bridge pillars on the new bridge is wider, to enable the canal to be broadened further. The old railway bridge had a small pedestrian path. After it was demolished in autumn of 2010, pedestrians must cross at Saltsjöbron instead. The old railway bridge replaced an even older bridge from 1860 that crossed around the area of Tältet. That bridge was demolished in the 1920s, when Saltskog railway station had been closed and replaced Södertälje södra railway station (subsequently renamed Södertälje hamn).

The Igelsta Bridge is the southernmost of the city's bridges. It is the main route for long distance and regional trains across Södertälje Canal. It is 2140 meters long, reaches as high as 48 meters above the canal, making it Sweden's tallest and longest railway bridge (after the Swedish part of the Øresund Bridge). Igelstabron spans between Pershagen and Hall. The bridge forms part of the Grödingebanan on the Western Main Line and opened in 1995. Södertälje syd railway station is located on the bridge's eastern abutment.

==== Accidents and incidents ====
On 13 February 2016, all four members of the English rock band Viola Beach (along with their manager Craig Tarry) were killed during their first overseas tour when their car fell from a bridge in Södertälje. The Swedish Police Authority opened an inquiry and found that Tarry, who was driving, had no traces of alcohol nor drugs in his blood. They also found that Tarry had engaged the brakes before reaching the bridge, ruling out the possibility that he had fallen asleep, and authorities said the incident ultimately remained "completely inexplicable".

=== Church buildings ===
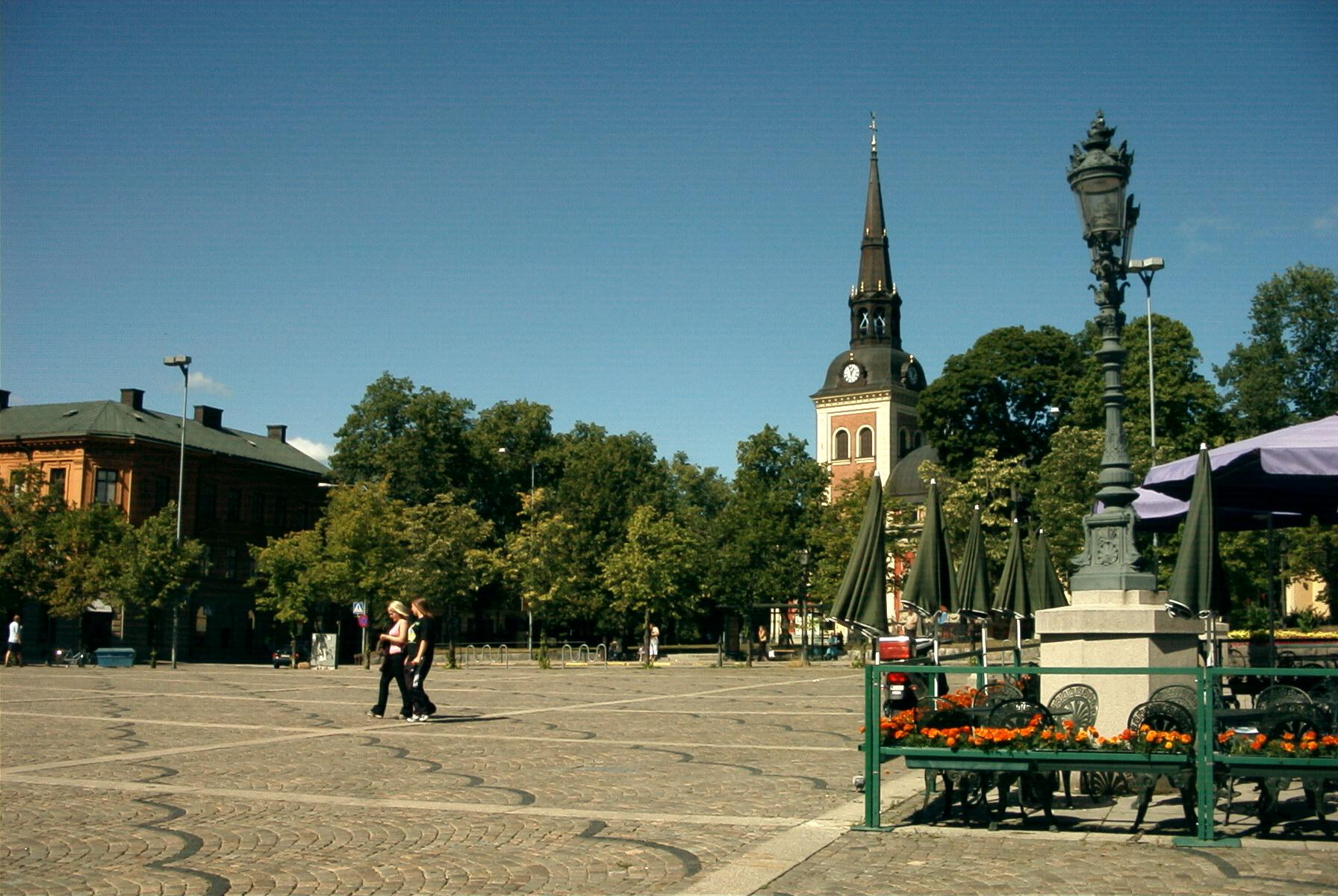
Church of Ragnhild of Tälje at Stortorget

Södertälje belongs to the Diocese of Strängnäs within the Church of Sweden. A total of eight church buildings are located within Södertälje. The oldest and most important to this day is Sankta Ragnhilds kyrka (English: Church of Ragnhild of Tälje) from the 1100s–1300s, which is located on the main square Stortorget. Further churches belonging to Södertälje parish are Sankt Mikaels kyrka (St. Michael's Church) in Geneta, Hovsjö kyrka (Hovsjö Church) and Lina kyrka (Lina Church) in Lina Hage. Lina kyrka was designed by Tallius Myhrman. It is renowned for its design, and has been depicted in several Swedish architecture magazines.

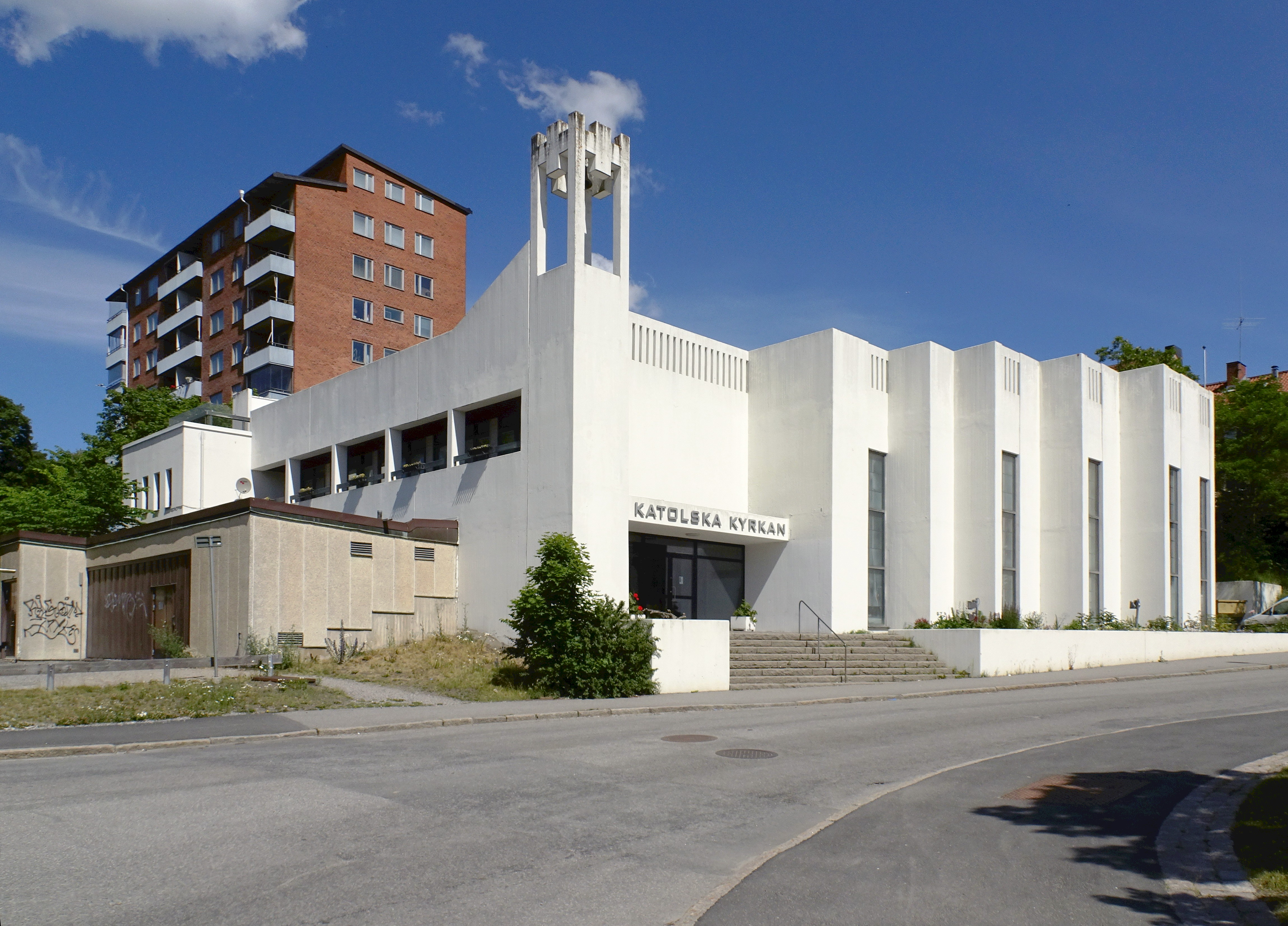
Sankt Ansgars kyrka is the city's Catholic Church

The main church in Östertälje parish is Alla Helgons kyrka (All Saints' Church) in Östertälje. The parish also operates Hagabergs kapell (Hagaberg's chapel) on the grounds of Hagaberg Folk high school. It was built in 1894 as a chapel on Vartofta farm in Västergötland. The chapel was moved to its present location in 1914, after having been dismantled and transported by train. In the centre of the Brunnsäng area lays the church Brunnsäng kyrka, which is the youngest in the city. There is also a chapel at Södertälje hospital.

There are several congregations not affiliated with the Church of Sweden in the city. The Catholic Church in Sweden has Sankt Ansgar's church by Mälarbron. The associated parish has members from a vast hinterland around the city. There is a sizable community of Orthodox Christians in Södertälje. The Syriac Orthodox Church has two bishops in the city, besides five Syrian Orthodox churches, two soccer teams and a TV channel that airs programs in Neo-Aramaic, Arabic and English. The minority group of Sweden Finns have services in the Finnish language within the Church of Sweden. There is also a Finnish-speaking Pentecostal congregation.

== Transportation ==
=== Roads ===
The E4 and E20 Motorways have their southern fork after which they form separate roads at Saltskog junction in Södertälje. Other major roads passing through the city are Riksväg 1 (to Trosa and further south), and Länsväg 225 (to Nynäshamn via Ösmo). These towns, plus Mariefred, Stockholm, Trosa and Gnesta, are served by regular buses. Riksväg 57 (to Katrineholm via Flen ) also begins in Södertälje.

=== Trains ===
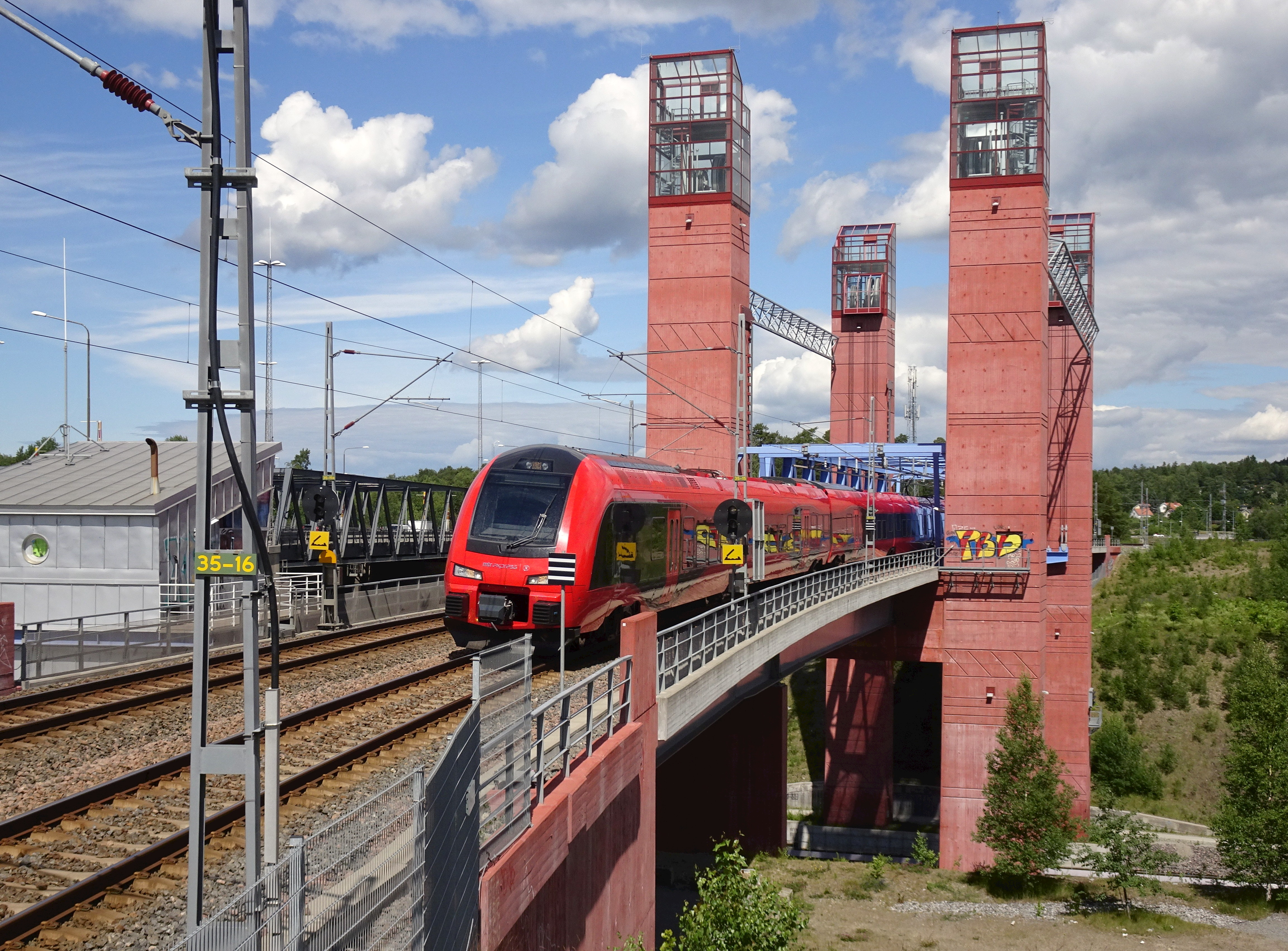
The railway bridge for local and commuter trains

Given the many railways that go to or through Södertälje, services are both frequent and diverse. International trains to cities like Oslo and Copenhagen call in Södertälje, in addition to local, regional and national services. There are four stations within the urban area of the city: Södertälje centrum (central station), Södertälje syd, Södertälje hamn and Östertälje.

Due to its topography and the fact that it is divided by a canal, it has been difficult to build good train connections in and through the city. Despite this, Södertälje is one of the largest railway hubs in Sweden. When the railway to Södertälje was commissioned, it was decided that the main line would not be drawn through what was then the immediate city centre. The decision was one of the factors behind the urban planning of the area Mariekälla, just south of the Järnatullen city toll.

The railway station in Södertälje became Södertelge Öfre (English: Södertälje Upper). Its initial name of Södertelge caused confusion as it was then well outside the city, which was resolved by the name change. The central station was named Södertelge nedre (English: Södertälje lower). In 1885, the stations' names were changed again, with Södertelge upper being named Saltskog, and Södertelge nedre becoming Södertälje Central. Both railway stations opened in October 1860, together with the railway to Stockholm. The railway would subsequently become extended further south towards Katrineholm and Gothenburg and become the Western Main Line. The railway Norra Södermanlands Järnväg through the northern part of the province of Södermanland opened in 1895, which meant that Södertälje also got a railway connection to Eskilstuna. Södertelge Öfre opened with a simple wooden station building with two platforms and a warehouse. A modern stone building replaced the old station in 1885. The Central Railway Station stands out by having two station buildings. The oldest is entirely in red brick, and was designed by the railway architect Adolf W. Edelsvärd. The yellow building was added in the 1910s and was designed by Folke Zettervall. In October 1921, the station Södertälje södra opened together with the new double track through the city. Södertälje Södra replaced the old railway station in Saltskog, whose station house was demolished in 1947 or possibly earlier.

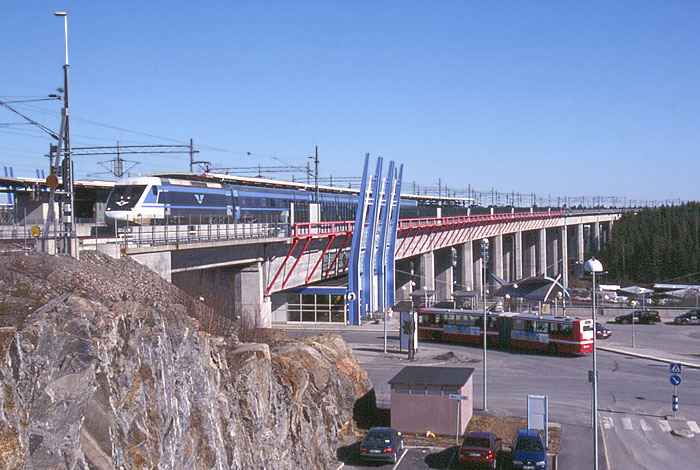
Södertälje syd railway station is situated on the Igelsta Bridge

The next traffic diversion occurred in 1994, when the Igelsta Bridge opened. Unlike the other bridges in Södertälje, it is built on sail-free altitude above the canal. Södertälje syd railway station (English: Södertälje south) is located on its western abutment. It is the city's current station serviced by long distance inter-city and high-speed rail. The old railroad below the bridge is used by commuter trains. Platforms are located both on the bridge, and on the old tracks below. The waiting hall is situated on a concourse level between the tracks. After Södertälje syd opened, the stations in the city once again changed their names. Södertälje södra became Södertälje hamn (English: Södertälje port), and the Central Station became Södertälje centrum. Igelsta station had previously changed name to Östertälje.

Today, Södertälje is a railway hub for Svealandsbanan, the Western Main Line and Nyköpingsbanan. Both the more recent Grödingebanan for long-distance trains and the old main line run in the direction towards Stockholm. The many railways that pass through Södertälje mean that it is possible to travel to Sweden's three major cities (Stockholm, Gothenburg and Malmö) without changing trains.

=== Waterways ===
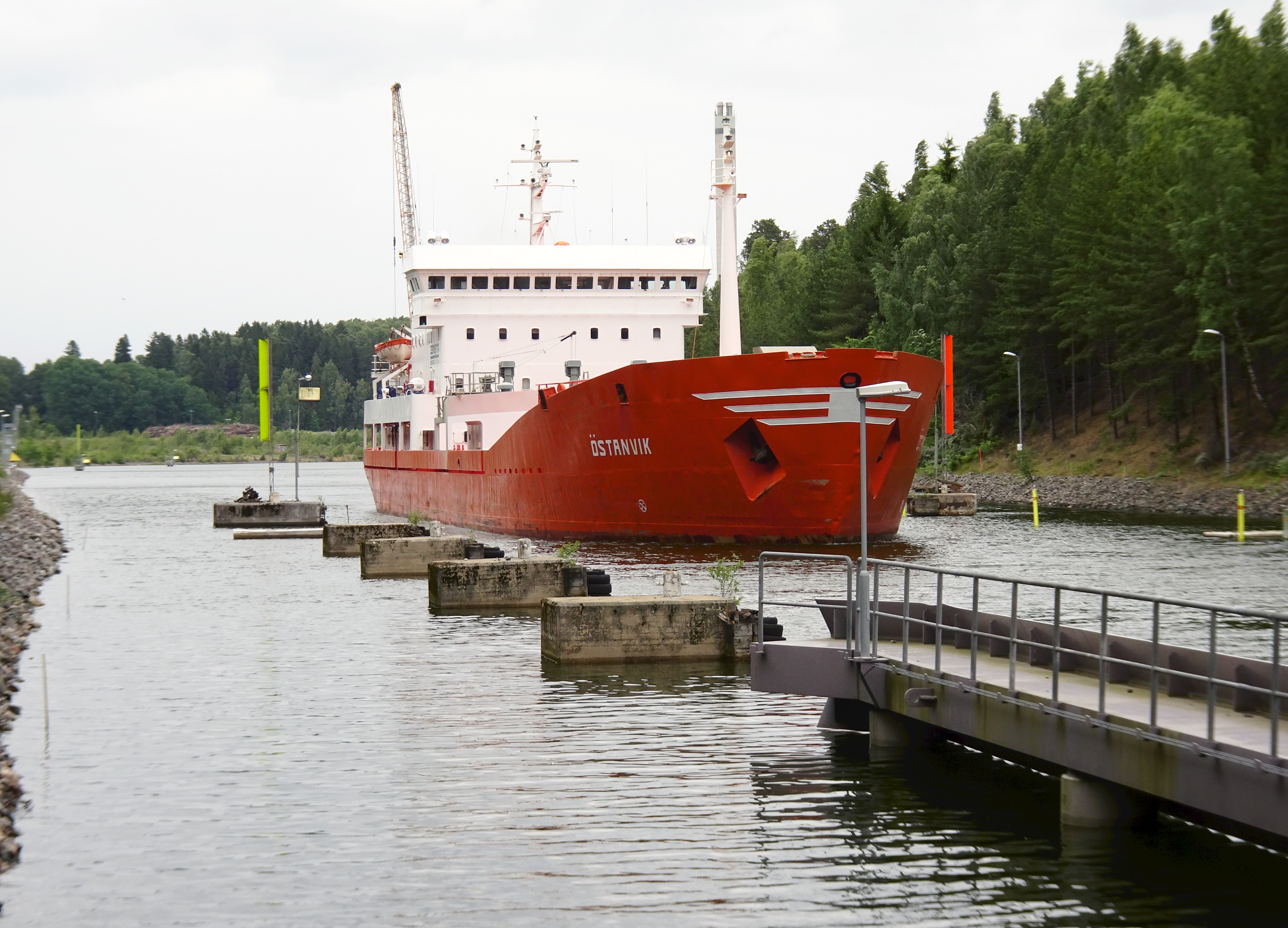
M/S Östanvik entering Södertälje canal

The first functioning canal through Södertälje was built between 1806 and 1819 after drawings by water engineering engineer Eric Nordewall. The canal has since been extended and broadened on several occasions. Within the scope of the Mälarprojektet initiative, the canal was expanded between 2016 and 2020 to handle vessels that are 160 meters long and 23 meters wide. The project encompassed a longer and wider lock, and dredging of the sides of the canal to make them straighter. The width of the water surface was thus kept unchanged.

Every day, over 40 boats pass through Södertälje canal, carrying more than 5 million metric tonnes of goods each year. Of these, about 4 million tonnes are shipped into Lake Mälaren, and 1 million tonnes to the Baltic Sea. Primarily, coal, cement, iron, limestone and chalk are carried through the canal. The port of Södertälje also acts as a transhipment terminal from rail to trucks and ships.

The port of Södertälje consists of four wharfs: Sydhamnen, Oljehamnen, Igelsta, and Uthamnen. Sydhamnen primarily handles containers and roll-on/roll-off cargo, including imported cars. The oldest wharf is Uthamnen. Here, smaller quantities of odd bulk cargo are handled, mainly road salt. Combustible goods are primarily transported to the Igelstahamnen to the Igelsta heating plant. Oljehamnen handles imports of gas, liquid chemicals, oil and similar products. Since the 1950s, the port of Södertälje has been important for the Swedish import of cars. About 80,000 cars are handled per year, which corresponds to about 30 percent of total national car imports. Cars shipped to Södertälje are of Volkswagen, Škoda, Audi, Ford, Porsche, Opel and Mercedes brands.

=== City buses ===
Owing to Södertälje's location close to a county border, both SL and Sörmlandstrafiken operate buses in the city. The city bus network consists of around fifteen bus lines. They use the Central Railway Station as hub. Before Järnagatan street became pedestrian, most buses would use that round through the city centre. Most now take Nygatan street. In addition to regular city buses, there are special services adapted to pensioners and people with disabilities known as Närtrafiken buses. Night services operate all night both weekends and weekdays. The city is served by two circular bus routes, one on each side of the canal.

== Economy ==
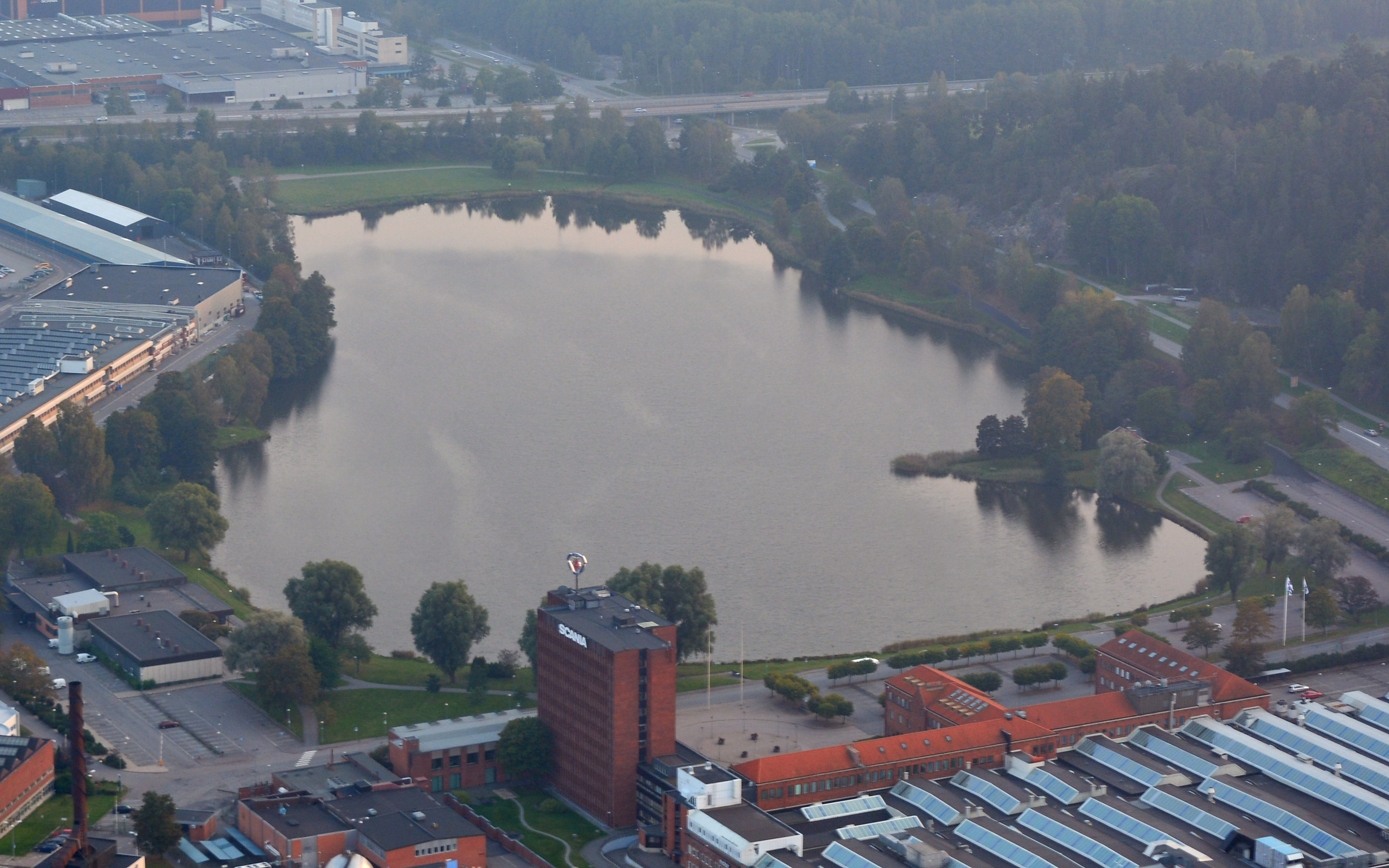
Scania headquarters by Saltskogsfjärden in Södertälje

Södertälje is particularly known for its two large companies, Astra Zeneca and Scania. Measured in sheer number of companies, the retail, wholesale and restaurant sectors dominate, with about 1,000 companies. The building and construction industry has about 600 companies in the Södertälje, and some 450 companies in the consultancy sector. In total, there are over 4,000 businesses in the city. Södertälje has a high number of small businesses with five or fewer employees.

=== Large corporations ===
Astra AB was founded in 1913 by pharmacist Adolf Rising. Initially, the company had only ten employees, but already developed strongly during the first years. The company started with only five employees, but grew exponentially in its first years of trading. One of the reasons was an increased need for medication due to World War I. The company merged with its British competitor Zeneca in 1999, and formed the pharmaceutical group AstraZeneca. The company's pill factory in Gärtuna in south-eastern Södertälje is the largest of its kind in the world, employing over 3,200 people.

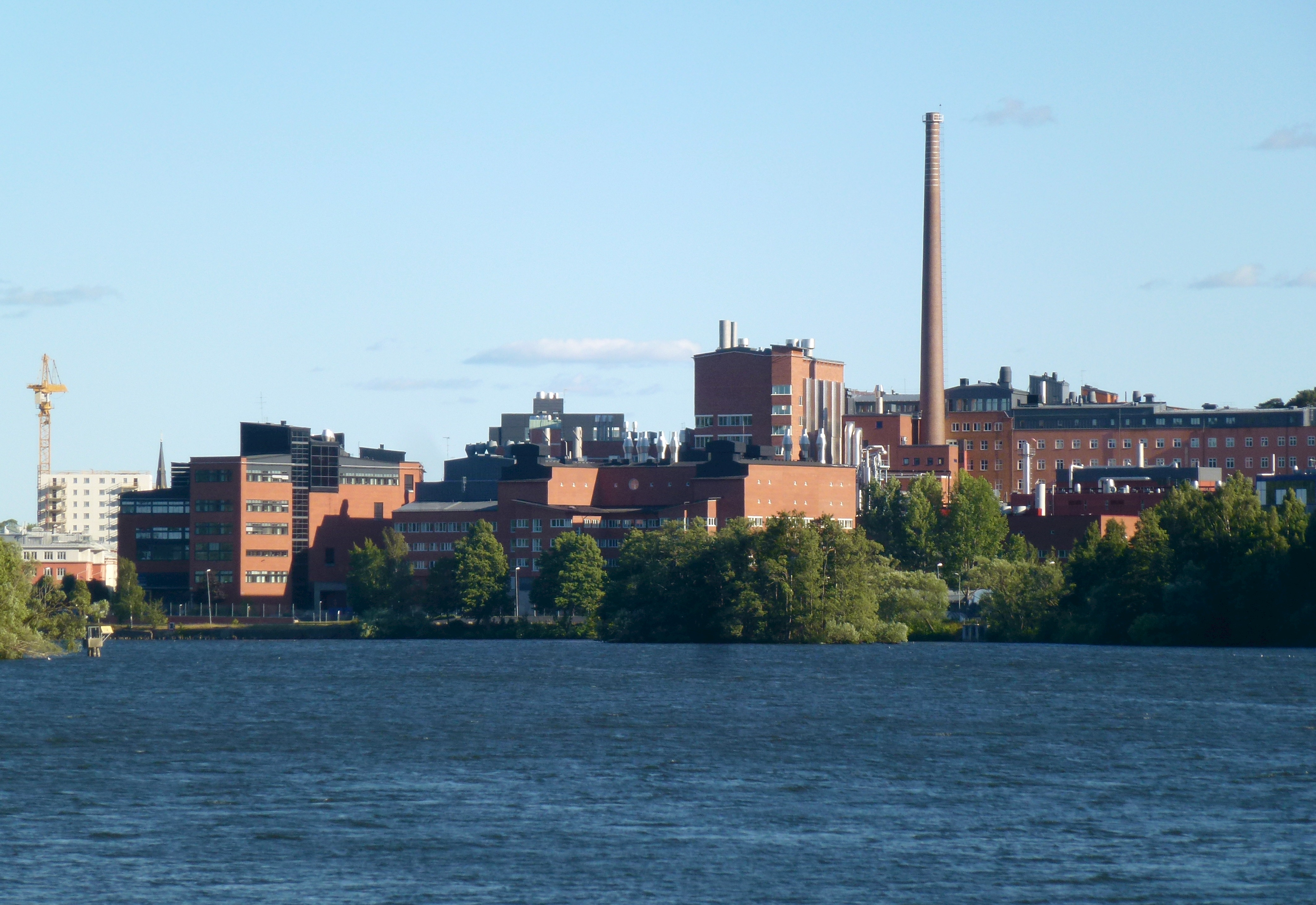
AstraZeneca premises by the Södertälje Canal

In 1891, Vabis started as manufacturier of railway cars, petrol engines, automobiles, trucks, motor-powered draisines, motorboats and marine engines. In 1911 they merged with Maskinfabriks-aktiebolaget Scania and formed Scania-Vabis. The company only uses the name Scania AB today. The head office remains in its original location, by Saltskogsfjärden south of the city centre of Södertälje. Together with its subsidiaries, Scania currently employs over 9,000 people in Södertälje, making the Group the largest employer.

=== Retail trade ===
Most retail shopping is available in the city centre; predominantly on Storgatan and Järnagatan streets, but also adjacent areas. The Kringlan department store was one of the first modern department stores when it opened in 1965. The name Kringlan (English: The Pretzel) is a reference to the long-lasting local tradition of selling pretzels in Södertälje. Other department stores include Luna and Telgehuset. Retail shopping outside the city centre is mainly located in Moraberg on the eastern side of the canal, as well as Vasa Handelsplats in the western part. Larger stores are also located around Hansaplan in the Södra area.

== Education ==
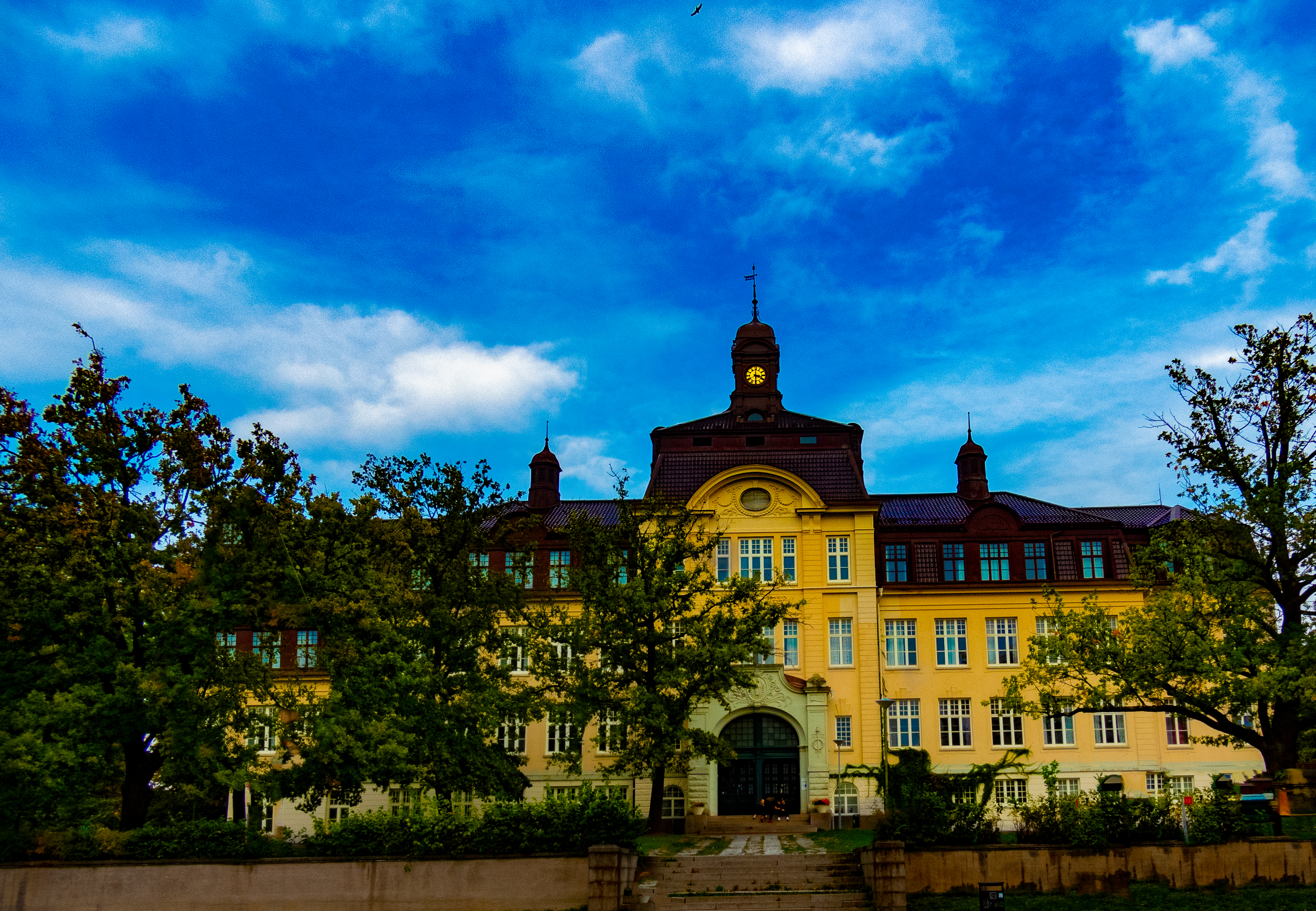
Läroverket upper secondary school building from 1913

KTH Royal Institute of Technology has a campus in Södertälje, where they conduct university education within Mechanical engineering, Logistics and other subjects all the way up to Master's level including Master of Science in Engineering. Education is given in cooperation with the city's two large corporations Scania AB and AstraZeneca. In 2018, KTH moved in to a newly built campus in Södertälje Science Park drawn by the architect firm White. The Royal Institute of Technology has 1,200 students and hired researchers in Södertälje.

Several universities conduct higher education at the learning centre Campus Telge. When it started it was located in Mariekälla, but moved to new premises that previously housed the headquarters of Astra AB in 2015. Both individual courses and whole university programmes are offered within a variety of subjects, meaning students can study at the campus all the way until graduation. Education within Yrkeshögskolan (English: Higher Vocational Education) is also held.

Hagabergs folkhögskola started as a Bible Institute in 1910, and became a folk high school in 1957. It is run by the Swedish Evangelical Mission. Around 250 students study at the academy, of which 20 reside at the boarding school. The curriculum mostly centres on studies of Christian theology. The general introductory course for students pursuing a career within the Church of Sweden, as well as Allmän kurs, which is mostly non-religious and supplements normal secondary school education.

In 2017, Södertälje had 13 secondary schools, five of which were municipal and eight operated as charter schools.

== Culture ==
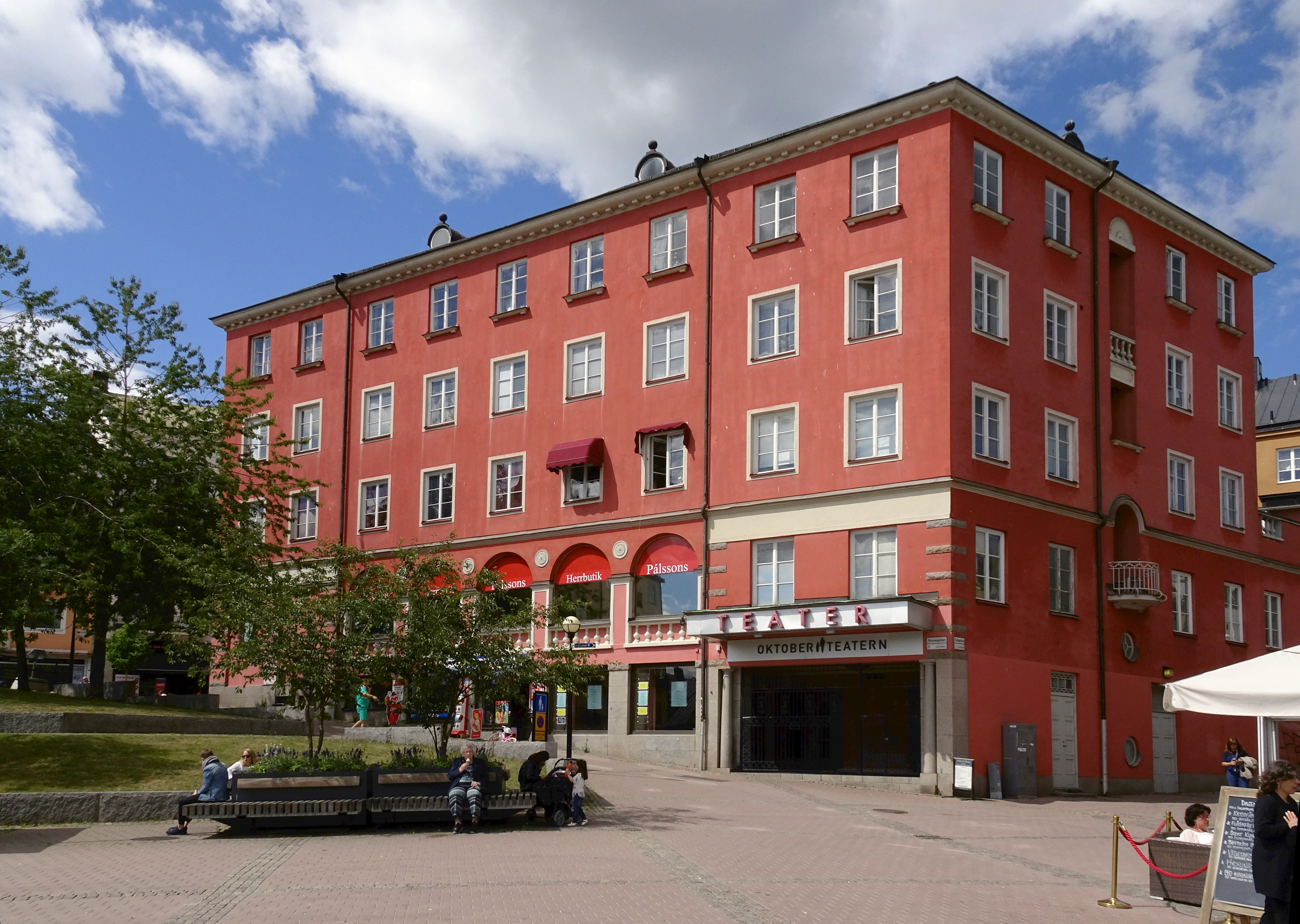
Oktoberteatern at Marenplan

Södertälje's primary theatre is Oktoberteatern at Marenplan, which has a number of new productions each year. The venue opened in 1928. It originally contained a cinema called Castor, but was turned in to a theatre after a renovation in 1984. Södertälje is also home to Sweden's only professional Finnish-language theatre group; Teatteri Kipinä.

One of the most popular cultural centre around the city is Kulturhuset i Ytterjärna (English: The Cultural Centre in Ytterjärna). The complex houses a theatre, café, conference rooms and offices. It opened in 1992, and won second prize for Sweden's most popular modern building in 2001. During construction, special attention was paid to the acoustics of the premises, which has resulted in many concerts being held here. The concert hall has about 500 seats, and together with other anthroposophical activities receives about 30,000 visitors annually. Other cultural activities include exhibitions on architecture and garden art.

The stages Estrad and Trombon at the City Hall often show theatre as well as concerts and film. The association Molto has organised concerts and creative activities for youth since 2008. A recurring tradition in Södertälje is the local revue Täljerevyn, which makes humorous cabarets about the city, local traits and politics every year.

=== Museums ===
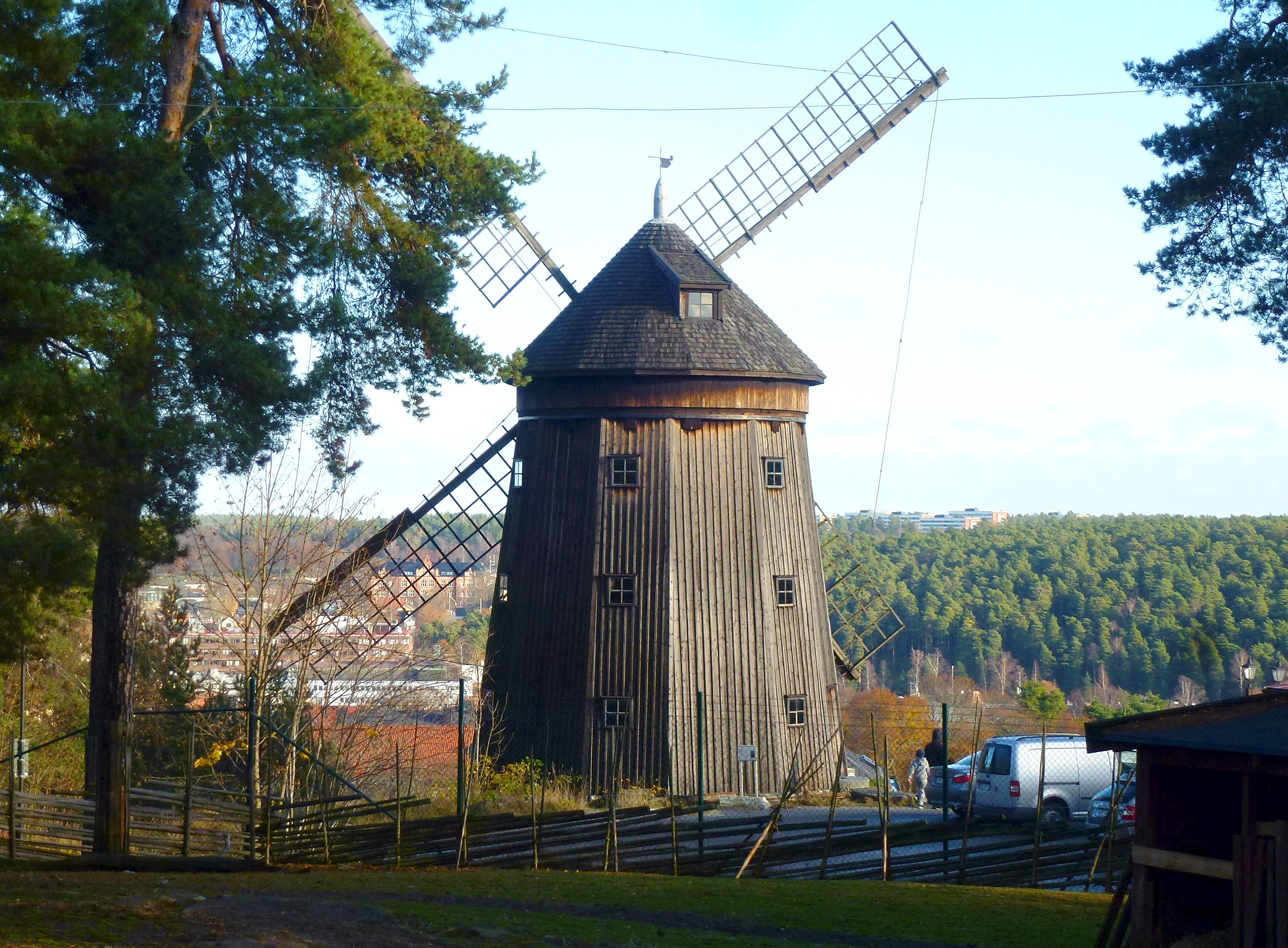
The windmill at Torekällberget

Torekällberget open-air museum (colloquially referred to as just Torekällberget or simply Berget) with the city museum Södertälje Stadsmuseum, is one of the most popular sights to visit in the city. The museum first opened in 1929 when the landmark windmill and a few other buildings were moved to the site. In connection with the redevelopment of the city centre in 1961, many old buildings were moved to Torekällberget. The museum is divided into the environments "Staden" (English: the City) and "Landet" (English: the Countryside). The urban environment is built around the main square Tenngjutartorget, where markets often are held. The square is surrounded by buildings from the 1700–1800s. Several species of domestic animals are kept at the museum. The environment conveys a picture of life in rural farms around Södertälje in the 1800s and earlier. There is also a stage where ballroom dancing and performances are often arranged during the summer months.

The vehicle museum Marcus Wallenberg-hallen (English: The Marcus Wallenberg Hall) is situated by Saltskogsfjärden, next to the headquarters of Scania AB. The museum is named after the industrialist Marcus Wallenberg Jr. The collections include a number of older vehicles and environments; like the first mass-produced car in Sweden from 1903. It also features railway cars that were owned by the Swedish State Railways, used between the late 1800s until the early 1900s. Exhibited objects have been restored to their original condition. A little less than half of the museum consists of newer vehicles manufactured during the 2000s.

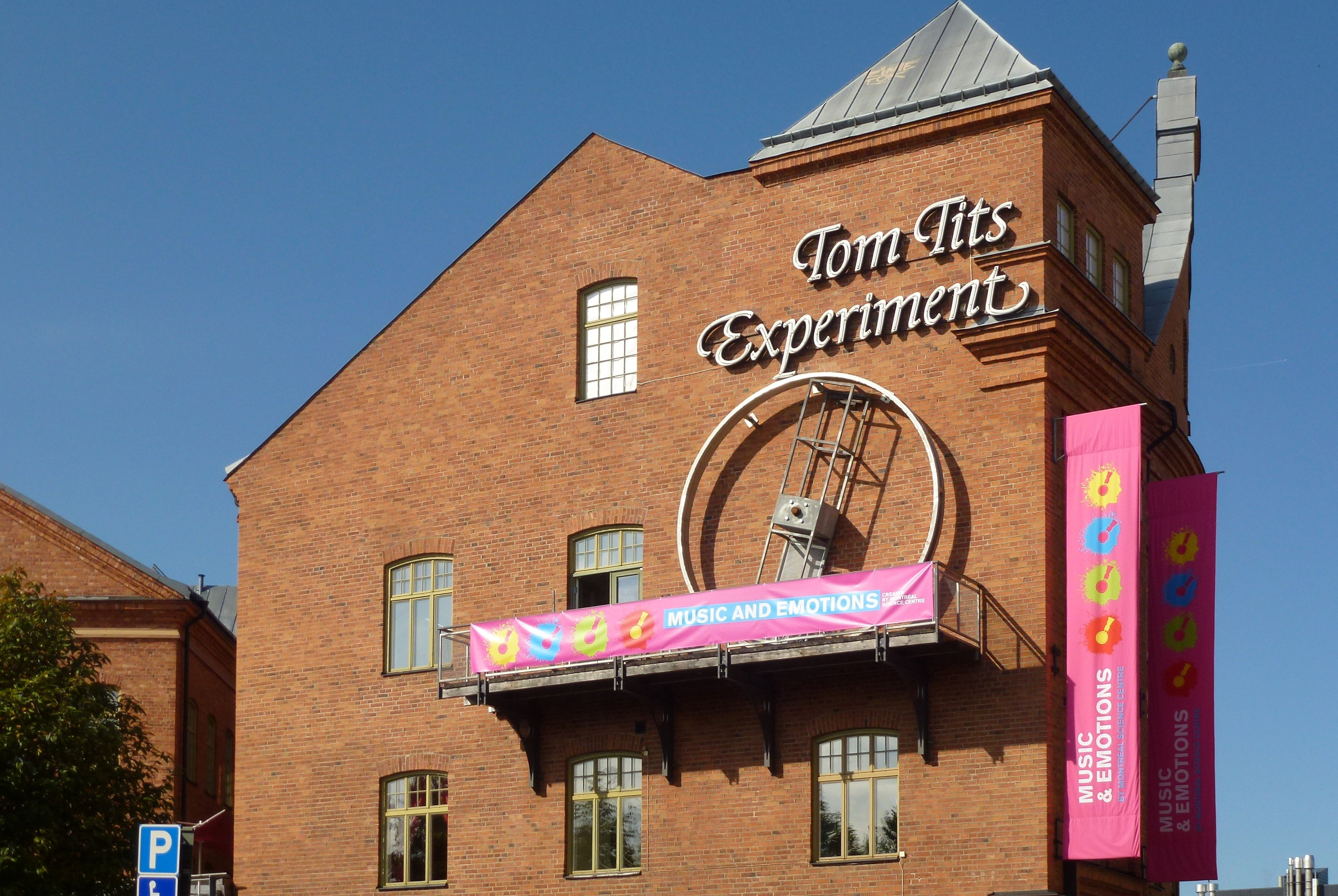
The science museum Tom Tits Experiment

Södertälje is home to a large science museum based on the book La Science Amusante by French writer Arthur Good. The museum is called Tom Tits Experiment after the author's pen name Tom Tit. It started as a temporary exhibition at Södertälje Hall of Arts (Swedish: Södertälje Konsthall), but became so popular that it was turned in to a permanent museum. The museum is located in an old industrial building at Storgatan street. Today, it is the largest Science centre in Sweden. It occupies four floors, and has a park that is open during the summer season. The exhibitions contain more than 400 science experiments. Tom Tits Experiment received around 190,000 visitors in 2018.

Saltskog gård (English: Saltskog manor) was the home of the industrialist and mecenate Carl Fredrik Liljevalch. Today it serves as a museum. The farm dates back to the 16th century. Liljevalch acquired it in 1881. Previously, the farm had been owned by the families Lovisin, Gyllenstierna, Dufva and Tamm. Liljevalch did however became the first to actually settle there permanently. He took an active part in the daily activities on the farm, and aspired that Saltskog gård would serve as a textbook example of ideal farming. He undertook extensive renovations of the farm and the estates to make them a cultural centre filled with art. An extension was made to the main building; and a smaller villa was added, together with a barn, stables and outhouses. The garden contains several unusual species of trees and is designed as an English landscape garden. Two new commemorative rune stones were carved. Today, the manor is run by a non-profit association. They have restored much of the premises in their original condition. There are several artist studios and exhibition halls. Concerts, lectures and exhibitions are held all year round. During the summer season, theatre is also performed in the gardens.

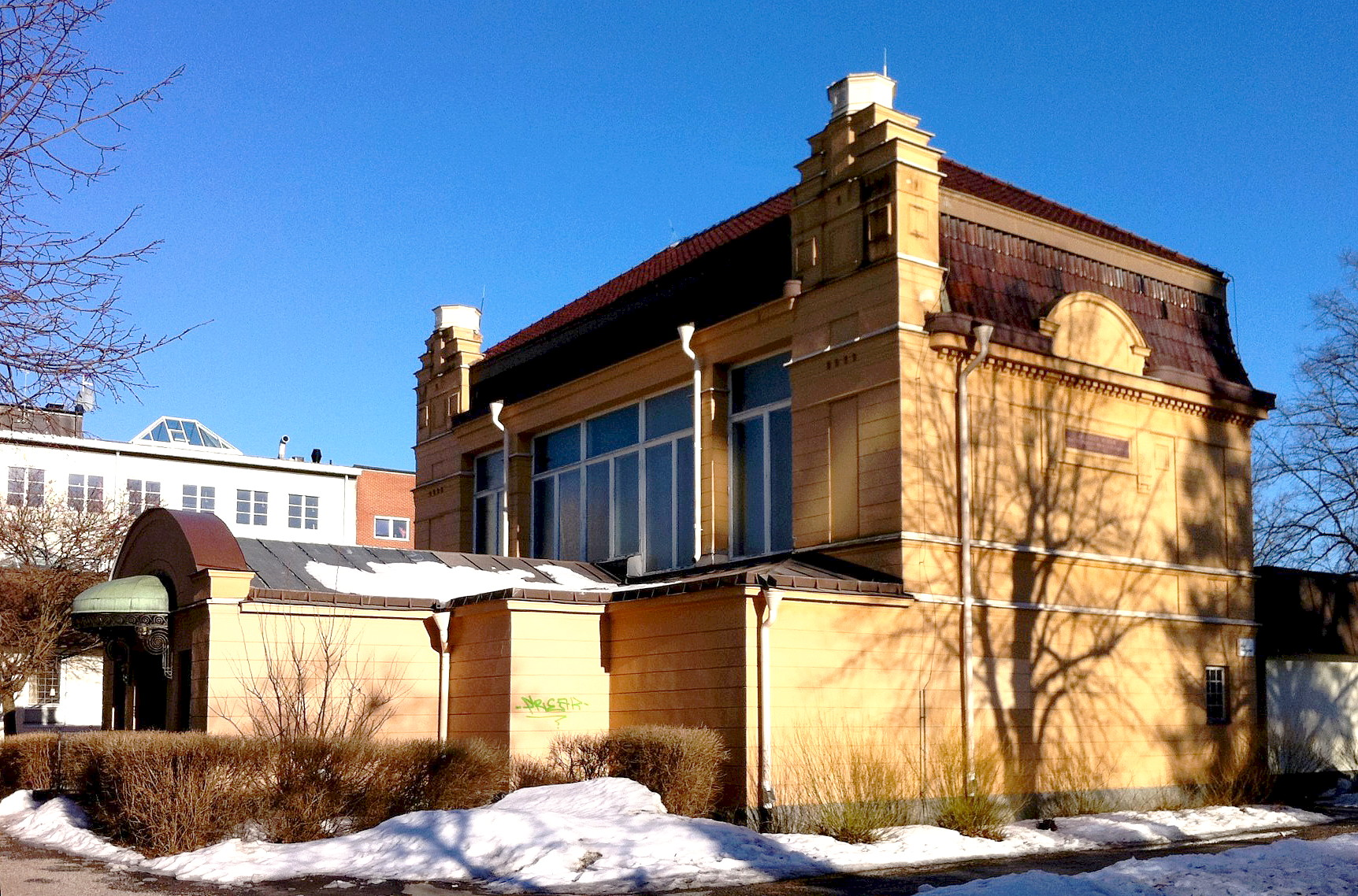
Biologiska Museet museum of biology

Biologiska Museet (English: The Museum of Biology) was donated to the city by patron Carl Fredrik Liljevalch. The building is in Art Nouveau style, and located on Erik Dahlbergs road. It opened to the public in 1913, thus making it the oldest museum in the city. The exhibitions were created by Gustaf Kolthoff and his son Kjell Kolthoff, and show animals and birds from the province of Sörmland (where Södertälje is located) in their natural environments. In total, there are over 100 different species on display. Kjell Kolthoff painted the large dioramas that have remained to this day. The museum was completely renovated and reopened in 1983.

The world's oldest propeller-driven steamship which still has its original engine is S/S Ejdern. It was originally built by Götaverken in Gothenburg in 1880. During its first years, Ejdern operated in the Gothenburg archipelago, Lake Roxen, and several ports in central Sweden. Since 1906, it has had its home port in Södertälje. The first route from the port in Södertälje was to Mörkö, and cargo hauls in eastern Lake Mälaren. Between 1914 and 1957, the boat had one single owner, Rickard Fredmark. He sold the boat to the City of Södertälje. At that time, the ship was unprofitable and in very poor condition. The city subsequently decided that the boat was to be scrapped. In 1964 the boat was donated to an association for the preservation of old boats. Enthusiasts of this particular vessel broke out and formed Museiföreningen Ångfartyget Ejdern (English: The Museum Association S/S Ejdern), who still own the boat today. Since 1976 they operate museum routs around Södertälje. From 1984, the boat is once again coal powered. S/S Ejdern has a capacity of 90 people, and often operates the route to Adelsö and Viking city Birka.

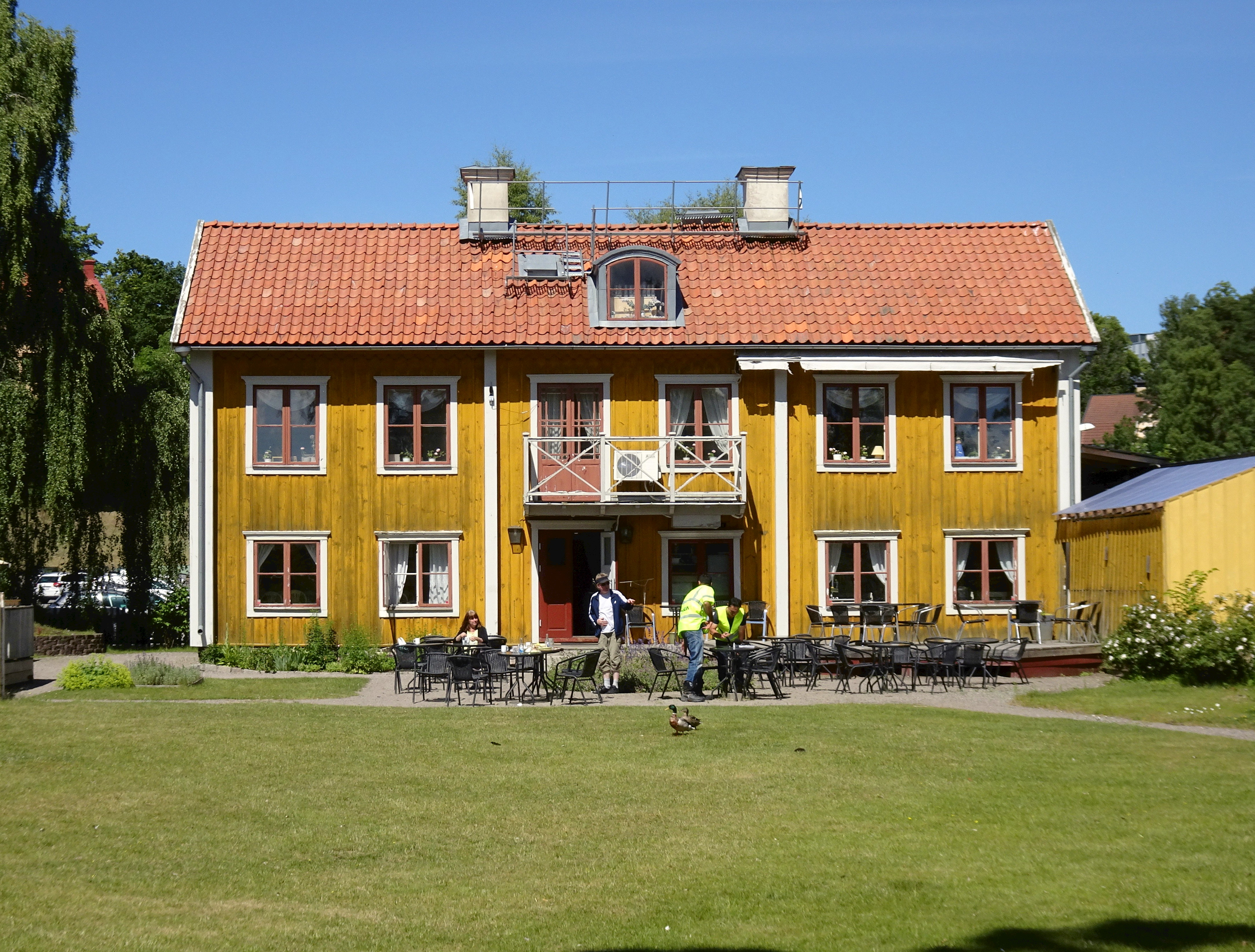
Wendela Hebbes hus museum

Wendela Hebbes hus (English: Wendela Hebbe's house) is a museum of Wendela Hebbe, who was the first female professional journalist in Sweden. She became employed at the newspaper Aftonbladet in 1841, where she wrote about theatre and music, and translated books. Besides being a journalist, she also wrote fairy tales. The building is a yellow wooden house, with two floors. It first stood at Snäckviken, close to the headquarters of Astra AB. The property was purchased by Lars Johan Hierta in 1863 to serve as a summer house for Wendela, her daughter Signe and the jointly unrecognised son Edvard Faustman. After being acquired by Södertälje Municipality it was moved to its present location between the canal and Marenplan in the city centre, and underwent extensive renovations. The venue houses a restaurant and a museum section with furniture and paintings from the Hebbe and Faustman families. It also acts as a cultural centre, hosting theatres and exhibitions.

Södertälje Konsthall (English: Södertälje Museum of Arts) showcases various exhibitions of paintings, sculptures and other artistic installations. The museum opened in 1968, and relocated to its current premises in Luna in 1978. In 2015, Grafikens Hus (English: House of Graphics) decided to relocate to the city from nearby Mariefred, meaning there would be two art museums in Södertälje.

=== Libraries ===
Södertälje's city library was originally run by an independent association, but was taken over by the city council in 1945. It moved to its present location in 1978. Lectures, courses and theatre are also held at the premises. The library has branches in Hölö, Järna, Enhörna, Hovsjö and Mölnbo. The libraries in Enhörna, Hölö and Mölnbo are combined school and public libraries.

== Sports ==
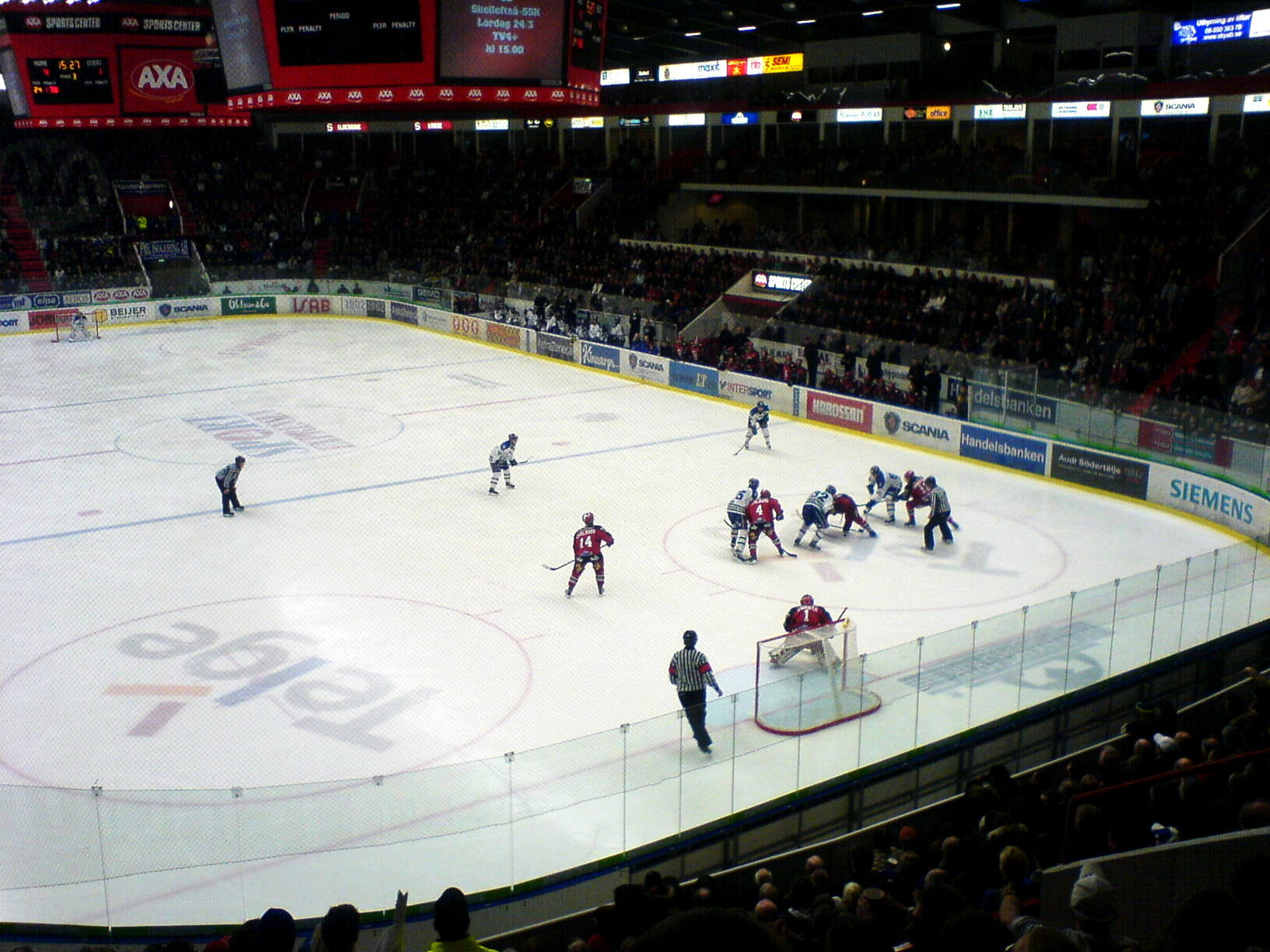
Södertälje SK playing in Scaniarinken

In basketball, Södertälje BBK or SBBK is one of the best in the country, and Södertalje KINGS became Swedish Champions in 2013, 2014 and 2015. In total SBBK has won 10 golds for the male team Södertalje KINGS and 12 golds for the female team Telge Basket. SBBK has in total 132 Swedish Championships since the star in 1968. Täljehallen is the home for SBBK.

The city is home to Södertälje SK, a classic and successful ice hockey team currently playing in Sweden's second-highest league – HockeyAllsvenskan – with Scaniarinken as their home arena. Assyriska FF and Syrianska FC are also two successful football clubs started in 1974 and 1977. They play at the same arena; Södertälje Fotbollsarena.

The Södertälje Rugbyklubb was formed in 1968. The Södertälje Storm Rugby League club are a pioneering Rugby league team, playing in the Swedish National Rugby League, which was formed in 2015.

There is an indoor swimming arena in which elite training and races are held, named Sydpoolen (English: the South pool).

== Climate ==
Södertälje, and the rest of Stockholm region has a humid continental climate (Köppen Dfb) and displays four distinct seasons. Due to the city's high northerly latitude, daylight varies widely from more than 18 hours around midsummer, to only around 6 hours in midwinter. Södertälje has much warmer and sunnier weather than other locations at the same latitude mainly because of the influence of Gulf Stream.

Summers have an average daytime high temperatures of 20–23 °C (68–73 °F) and lows of around 12 °C (54 °F), but there are periods of heat waves and many days with temperatures above 25 °C (77 °F)+). Winters are cold, though sometimes milder with temperatures ranging from −3 to 1 °C (27 to 34 °F), while spring and autumn mainly cool.

Annual precipitation is 640 mm (25 in) with light to moderate rainfall throughout the year. Snow mainly occurs from December through March, but snow cover duration varies between winters.

Climate data for Södertälje, 1991-2020 normals and extremes
Month	Jan	Feb	Mar	Apr	May	Jun	Jul	Aug	Sep	Oct	Nov	Dec	Year
Record high °C (°F)	11.1 (52.0)	11.9 (53.4)	18.3 (64.9)	26.0 (78.8)	28.5 (83.3)	30.3 (86.5)	32.4 (90.3)	31.3 (88.3)	26.3 (79.3)	22.5 (72.5)	15.6 (60.1)	13.0 (55.4)	32.4 (90.3)
Mean maximum °C (°F)	7.0 (44.6)	7.8 (46.0)	13.0 (55.4)	20.0 (68.0)	24.5 (76.1)	26.9 (80.4)	28.9 (84.0)	27.4 (81.3)	22.2 (72.0)	16.1 (61.0)	11.0 (51.8)	7.6 (45.7)	29.5 (85.1)
Mean daily maximum °C (°F)	0.9 (33.6)	1.4 (34.5)	5.1 (41.2)	11.1 (52.0)	16.7 (62.1)	20.5 (68.9)	23.2 (73.8)	21.9 (71.4)	16.7 (62.1)	10.2 (50.4)	5.3 (41.5)	2.2 (36.0)	11.3 (52.3)
Daily mean °C (°F)	−1.6 (29.1)	−1.7 (28.9)	1.1 (34.0)	5.7 (42.3)	10.8 (51.4)	15.1 (59.2)	17.9 (64.2)	16.8 (62.2)	12.2 (54.0)	6.9 (44.4)	3.0 (37.4)	−0.1 (31.8)	7.2 (45.0)
Mean daily minimum °C (°F)	−4.1 (24.6)	−4.5 (23.9)	−2.5 (27.5)	0.9 (33.6)	5.4 (41.7)	10.0 (50.0)	13.0 (55.4)	12.2 (54.0)	8.2 (46.8)	3.9 (39.0)	0.7 (33.3)	−2.5 (27.5)	3.4 (38.1)
Mean minimum °C (°F)	−14.7 (5.5)	−14.3 (6.3)	−11.3 (11.7)	−5.4 (22.3)	−0.9 (30.4)	4.2 (39.6)	8.1 (46.6)	6.3 (43.3)	1.1 (34.0)	−4.1 (24.6)	−7.0 (19.4)	−12.2 (10.0)	−17.3 (0.9)
Record low °C (°F)	−23.7 (−10.7)	−23.6 (−10.5)	−21.8 (−7.2)	−9.6 (14.7)	−4.8 (23.4)	1.3 (34.3)	6.2 (43.2)	3.5 (38.3)	−4.5 (23.9)	−9.4 (15.1)	−11.8 (10.8)	−25.0 (−13.0)	−25.0 (−13.0)
Average precipitation mm (inches)	44.6 (1.76)	37.3 (1.47)	33.9 (1.33)	34.4 (1.35)	40.2 (1.58)	68.9 (2.71)	72.1 (2.84)	73.7 (2.90)	59.1 (2.33)	59.6 (2.35)	57.8 (2.28)	58.0 (2.28)	639.6 (25.18)
Source 1: SMHI Open Data
Source 2: SMHI 1991-2020 normals

== Notable people ==
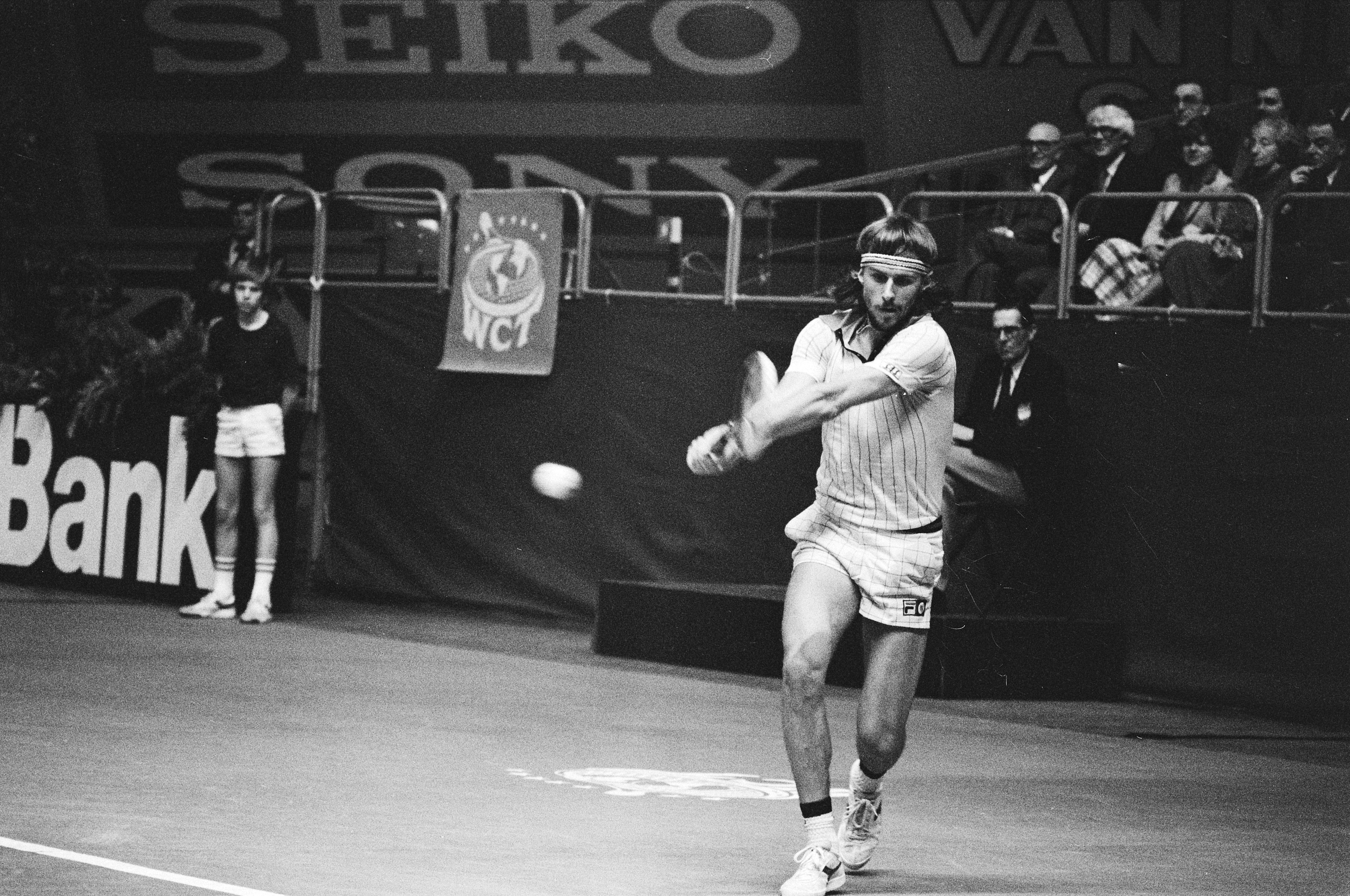
Tennis player Björn Borg grew up in Södertälje

- Hasse Aro, host of TV show Efterlyst
- Kennedy Bakircioglu, footballer
- Nicklas Bergfors, ice hockey player
- Mats Berggren, writer
- Björn Borg, tennis player, born in Stockholm, grew up in Södertälje
- Louay Chanko, footballer
- Johan Edlund, guitarist and vocalist of Tiamat
- Jan Guillou, author and journalist
- Carl Hagelin, ice hockey player
- Harry Källström, rally driver
- Felix Michel Melki, football player
- Alexander Michel Melki, football player
- Patrik Nordin, ski mountaineer and cross-country skier
- Karin Rådström, chief executive officer of Mercedes-Benz Trucks
- Torsten Sjögren (1896–1974), psychiatrist, geneticist and eugenicist
- Bengt Westerberg, former leader of the Liberal People's Party
- Erkan Zengin, footballer, born in Kulu, Konya, Turkey, grew up in Södertälje
