= List of later stave churches and replicas =

List of later stave churches and replicas

== Denmark ==
- Halmens Cemetery Chapel, Holmens Cemetery, Copenhagen, built in 1902.
- Hørning Stave Church, Moesgård Museum, Aarhus, reconstruction of an old church.

== Sweden ==
- Hållandsgårdens stave church in Åre, Jämtland, built 1999
- Häggviks stave church in Nordingrå, Norrland, built 2000
- Kårböle stave church in Ljusdal, Gävleborg, built 1989
- Skaga Stave Church in Töreboda, Västra Götaland county, built in the 12th century, torn down in the 19th century, rebuilt in the 1950s, burnt down, and rebuilt again in 2001
- Saint Olaf's chapel in Hardemo, Svealand, built 1766–1767
- Lillsjöhögen Stave Church (2011).

== Iceland ==
- Heimaey stave church at Heimaey, Vestmannaeyjar, built 2000

== Poland ==
- Vang Stave Church at Karpacz from Vang translated in 1842.

== United States ==
- Chapel in the Hills in Rapid City, South Dakota
- Boynton Chapel at Bjorklunden, Door County, Wisconsin
- Hopperstad Stave Church (replica) in Moorhead, Minnesota
- Norway Pavilion at Epcot in Walt Disney World, Florida
- Scandinavian Heritage Park in Minot, North Dakota
- St. Mark's Episcopal Church, in Islip, New York
- St. Swithun's in Warren County, Indiana
- Washington Island Stavkirke on Washington Island, Wisconsin.
- Little Norway, Wisconsin near Blue Mounds in Dane County, Wisconsin
- Borgound Stave Church (replica) in Lyme, Connecticut

== Norway ==
- Fantoft stave church (built c. 1150), a church in Bergen Municipality that was destroyed by arson in 1992 and rebuilt in 1997.
- Vår Frue Church (Porsgrunn) (built 1899), a Dragestil church in Porsgrunn Municipality that adheres closely to stave church design
- Fåvang Stave Church in Ringebu Municipality, Oppland – rebuilt in 1630 (two old churches rebuilt as one).
- New Gol Stave Church (built in the 1990s), a replica church in Gol Municipality on the site from which Gol Stave Church was relocated in the 1880s.
- Haltdalen Stave Church (replica), a copy of the old church at Sverresborg museum in Trondheim Municipality.
- Our Lady of Good Counsel Church, Porsgrunn, a Catholic Dragestil church built in 1899 that adheres closely to stave church design.
- St. Olaf's Church, Balestrand, an Anglican Church, built in Dragestil, from 1897. A stave church imitation.
- Johannes' church, Rendalen Municipality, built 2014-12017 Opplev Rendalen Johanneskirken

== Germany ==
- Gustav Adolf stave church in Hahnenklee, Harz region

== New Zealand ==
- Maria Stavkirke in Norsewood, New Zealand, completed in 2009
