= Häggvik =

Häggvik may refer to two places in Sweden:

- Häggvik, Kramfors Municipality, the location of Häggviks stave church
- Häggvik, Sollentuna, a district of Sollentuna Municipality
  - Häggvik railway station, a Stockholm commuter rail station; see Sollentuna railway station
