= Norrviken railway station =

Railway station in Sollentuna, Sweden

Norrviken
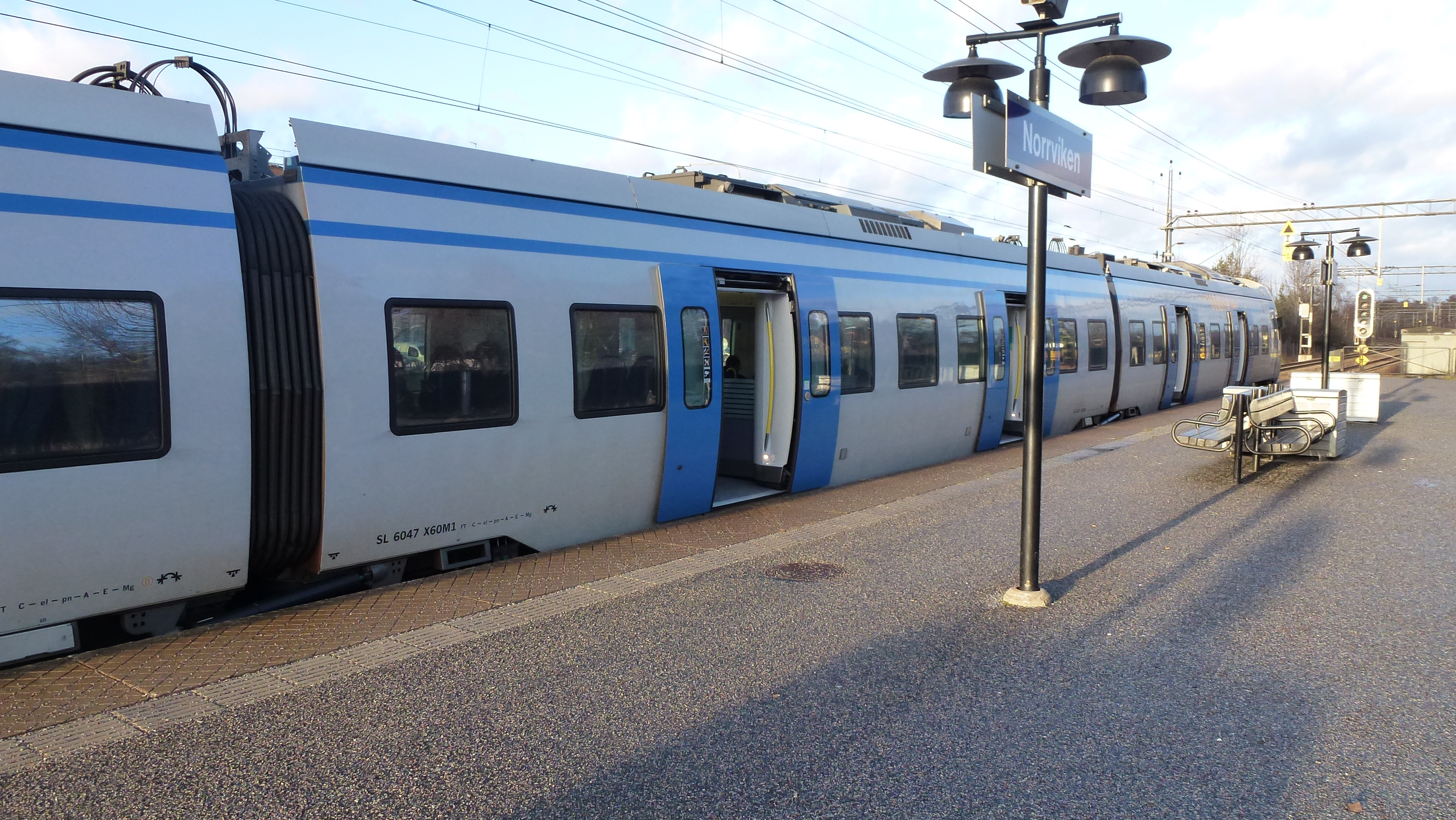

General information
- Location: Sweden
- Coordinates: 59.4586°N 17.9242°E
- System: Pendeltåg
- Owner: Swedish Transport Administration
- Platforms: Island platform
- Tracks: 4
- Connections: Bus terminal

Construction
- Structure type: At-grade

Other information
- Station code: Nvk

History
- Opened: 1907 (current layout 1993)

Passengers
- 2015: 2,000 boarding per weekday (2015) (commuter rail)

Services
Preceding station	Stockholm commuter rail	Following station
Rotebro towards Uppsala C	40	Häggvik towards Södertälje Centrum
Rotebro towards Märsta	41	Häggvik towards Södertälje Centrum
Rotebro towards Märsta	42X	Häggvik towards Nynäshamn
Location

Norrviken is a station on Stockholm's commuter rail network, located 16.9 km north of Stockholm Central Station in the Norrviken district of Sollentuna Municipality. The station consists of a single island platform with a ticket hall at the southern end, accessible via an underground pedestrian tunnel. As of 2015, the station had approximately 2,000 boardings per weekday.

== History ==
The station was originally constructed as a local train stop on the Northern Main Line (now part of the Ostkustbanan) following an agreement between SJ and AB Norrvikens Villastad. It was opened on 1 May 1907.

A red-brick station building was constructed in 1955, but it was demolished in 1993 when the Ostkustbanan railway was expanded to four tracks.

== Gallery ==
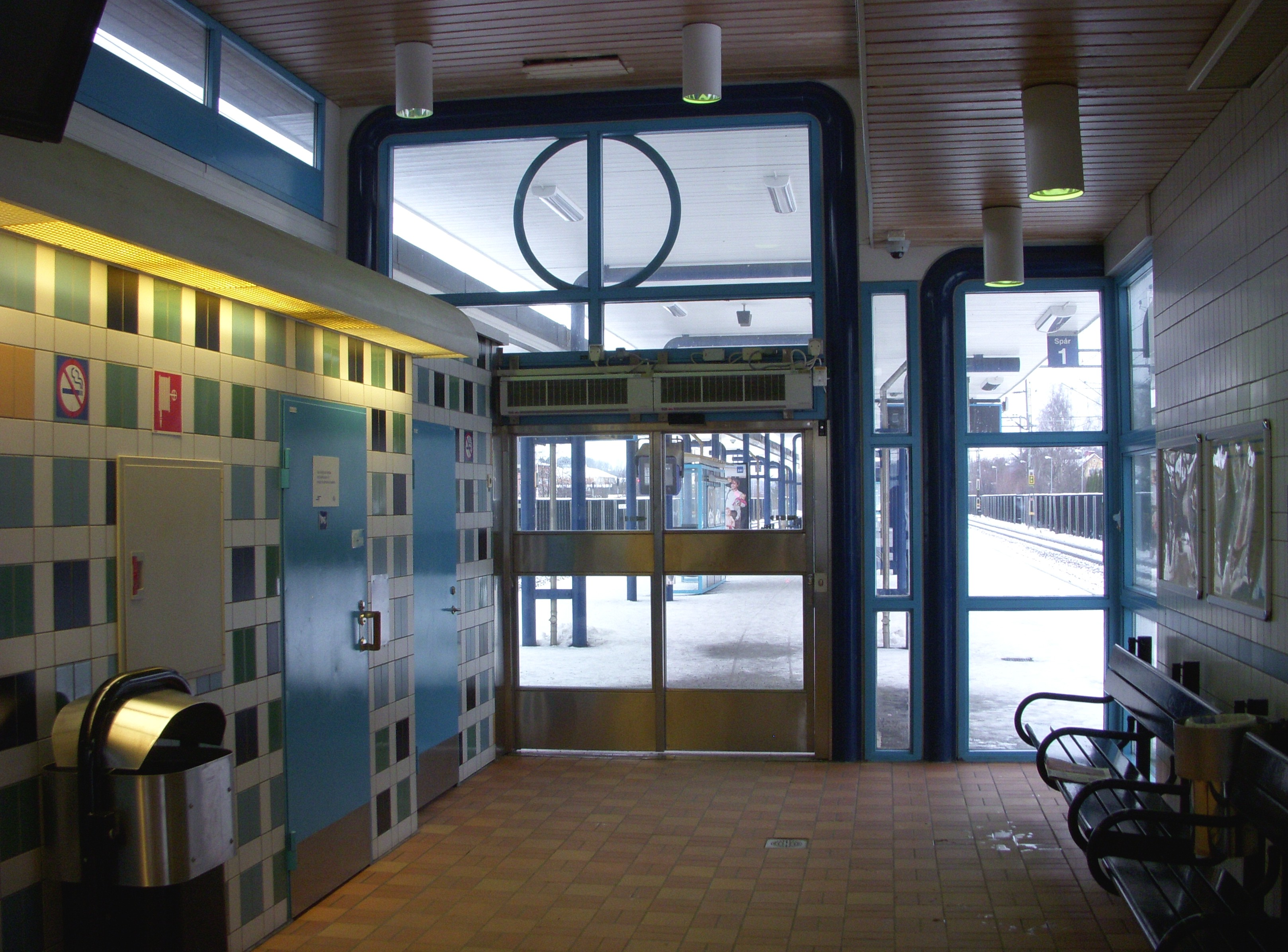

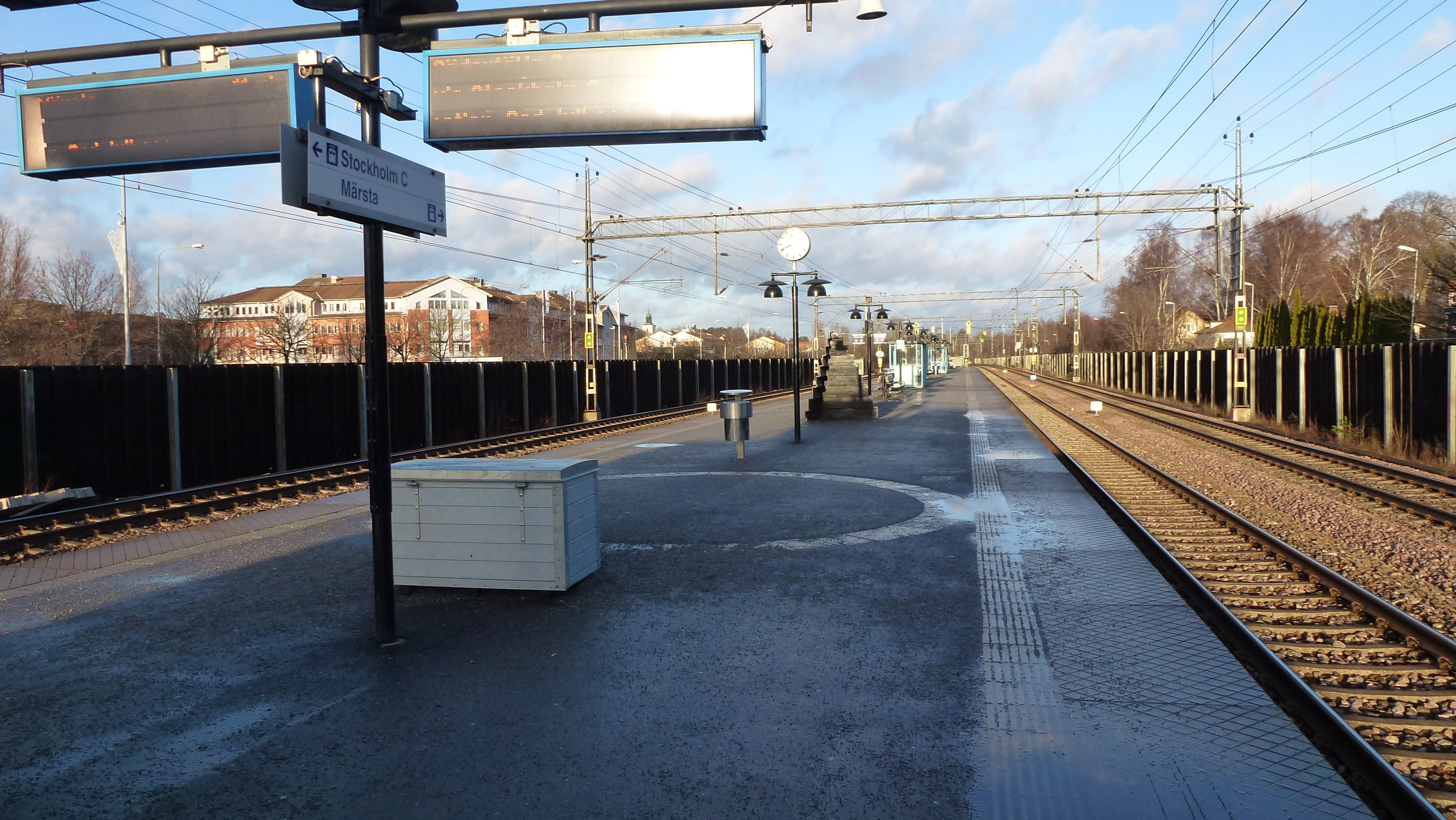

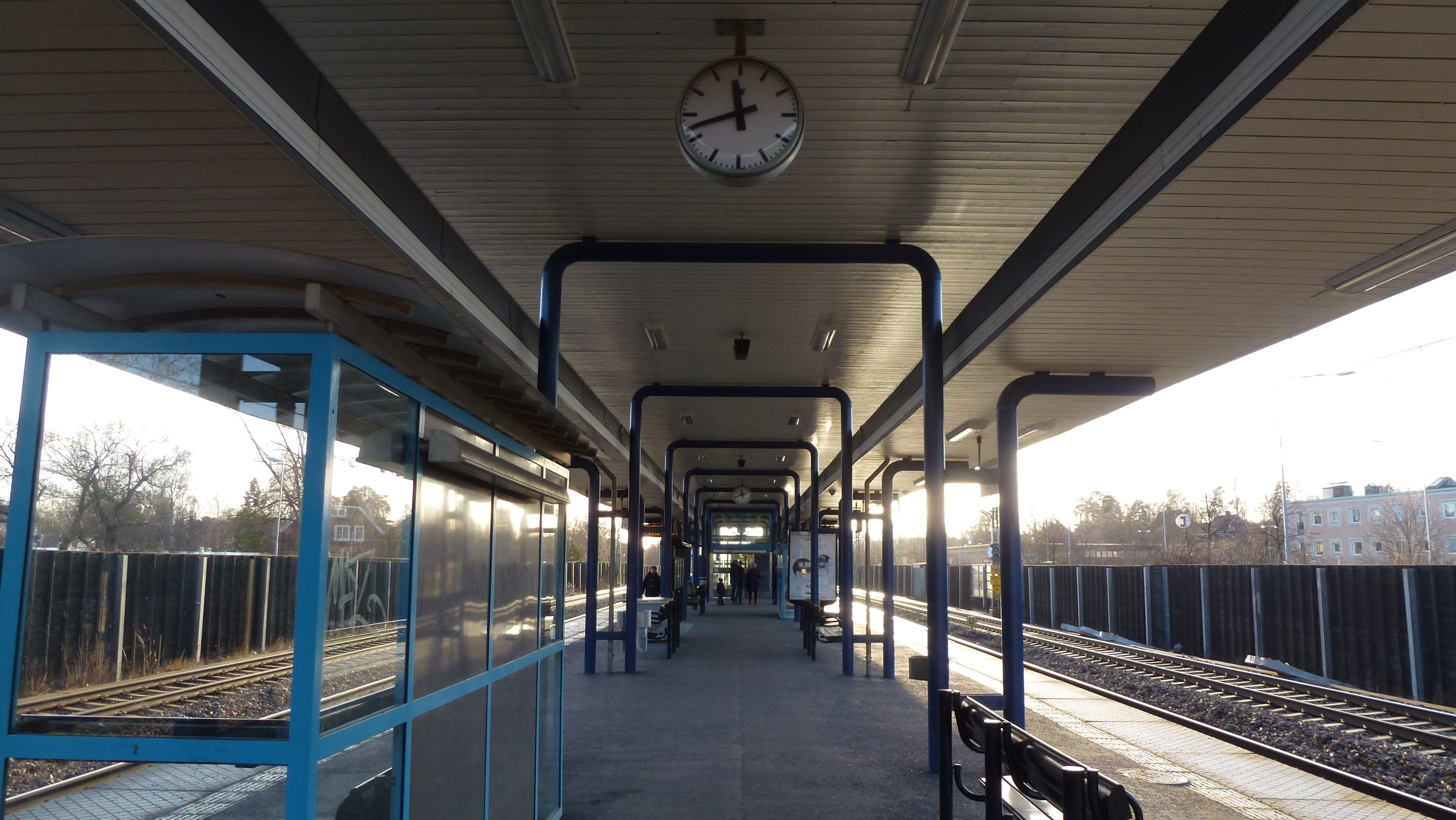

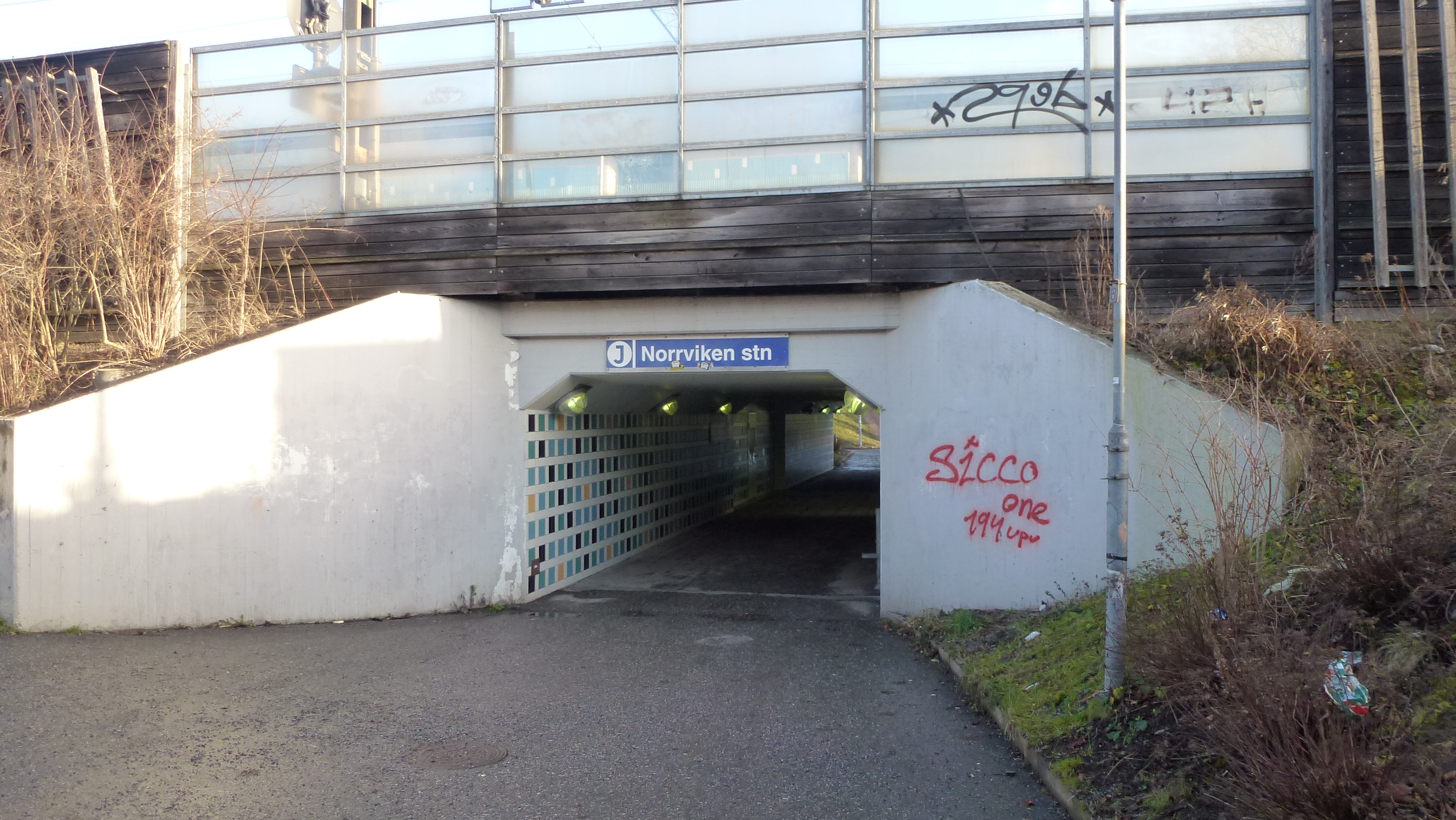

== Bibliography ==
- Hällqvist, Arne (2008). Pendeltåg i stockholmsområdet. TNF bok; 62. Trafik-Nostalgiska Förlaget. ISBN 978-91-85305-65-0. LIBRIS: 10672321.
- Harlén, Hans (2016). Pendeltågen. TNF bok; 217. Trafik-Nostalgiska Förlaget. ISBN 978-91-87695-49-0.

Media related to Norrvikens station at Wikimedia Commons
