= Upplands Väsby railway station =

Railway station in Upplands Väsby, Sweden

Upplands Väsby
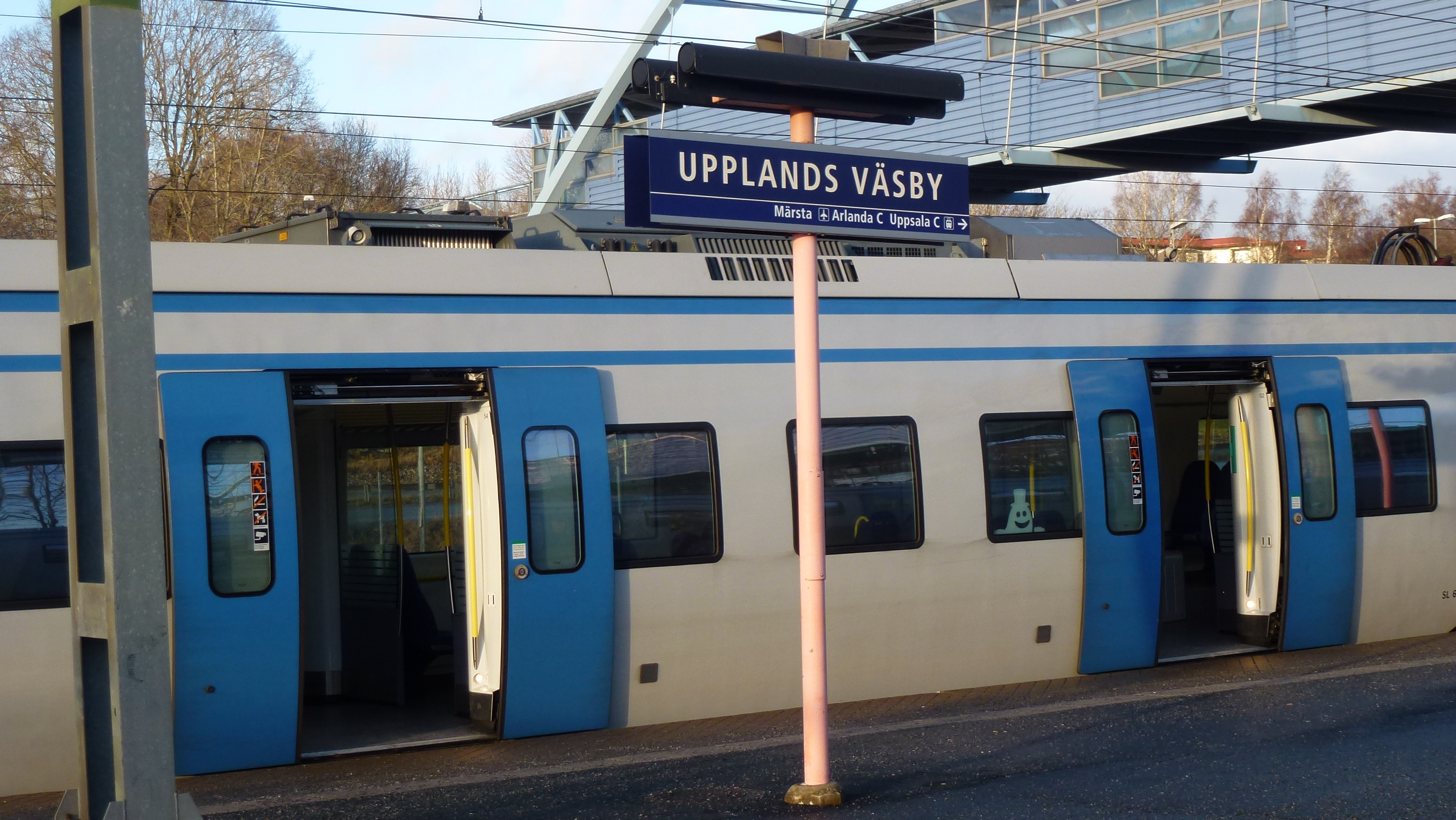

General information
- Location: Stockholm County
- Coordinates: 59°31′15″N 17°53′57″E
- System: Pendeltåg
- Owner: Swedish Transport Administration
- Platforms: 2
- Tracks: 2
- Connections: Bus terminal

Construction
- Structure type: At-grade

Other information
- Station code: Upv

History
- Opened: 1866

Passengers
- 2022: 7,700 boarding per weekday (commuter rail)

Services
Preceding station	Stockholm commuter rail	Following station
Arlanda Central towards Uppsala C	40	Rotebro towards Södertälje Centrum
Rosersberg towards Märsta	41	Rotebro towards Södertälje Centrum
Rosersberg towards Märsta	42X	Rotebro towards Nynäshamn
Location

Upplands Väsby is a station on the Stockholm commuter rail network, located 24.4 km north of Stockholm Central Station. It is the only station within Upplands Väsby Municipality, situated between Rotebro and Rosersberg stations. The station has two platforms and two ticket halls, with the northern hall accessed via an underpass and the southern hall connected to the bus terminal. A small depot is located north of the station, used for storing commuter train carriages. As of 2022, the station has an average of 7,700 boardings per weekday.

== History ==
The original station, initially named Väsby, opened in 1866 when the Northern Main Line (now part of the Ostkustbanan) was inaugurated. In 1907, it became the terminus for local trains from Stockholm. In 1939, the station name was changed to its current one to avoid confusion with names like Näsby or Visby. The postal service had made a similar change twenty years earlier, and in 1952, the name was adopted by the Upplands Väsby Municipality.

In 1967, SL took over the responsibility for local public transport within Stockholm County, introducing modern commuter train services and prompting the station's renovation. Further renovations took place in the 1980s and 1990s, when the track was expanded to four tracks. From 2006 to 2012, Upptåget had its southern terminus at Upplands Väsby, which led to the addition of temporary wooden platforms.

== Gallery ==
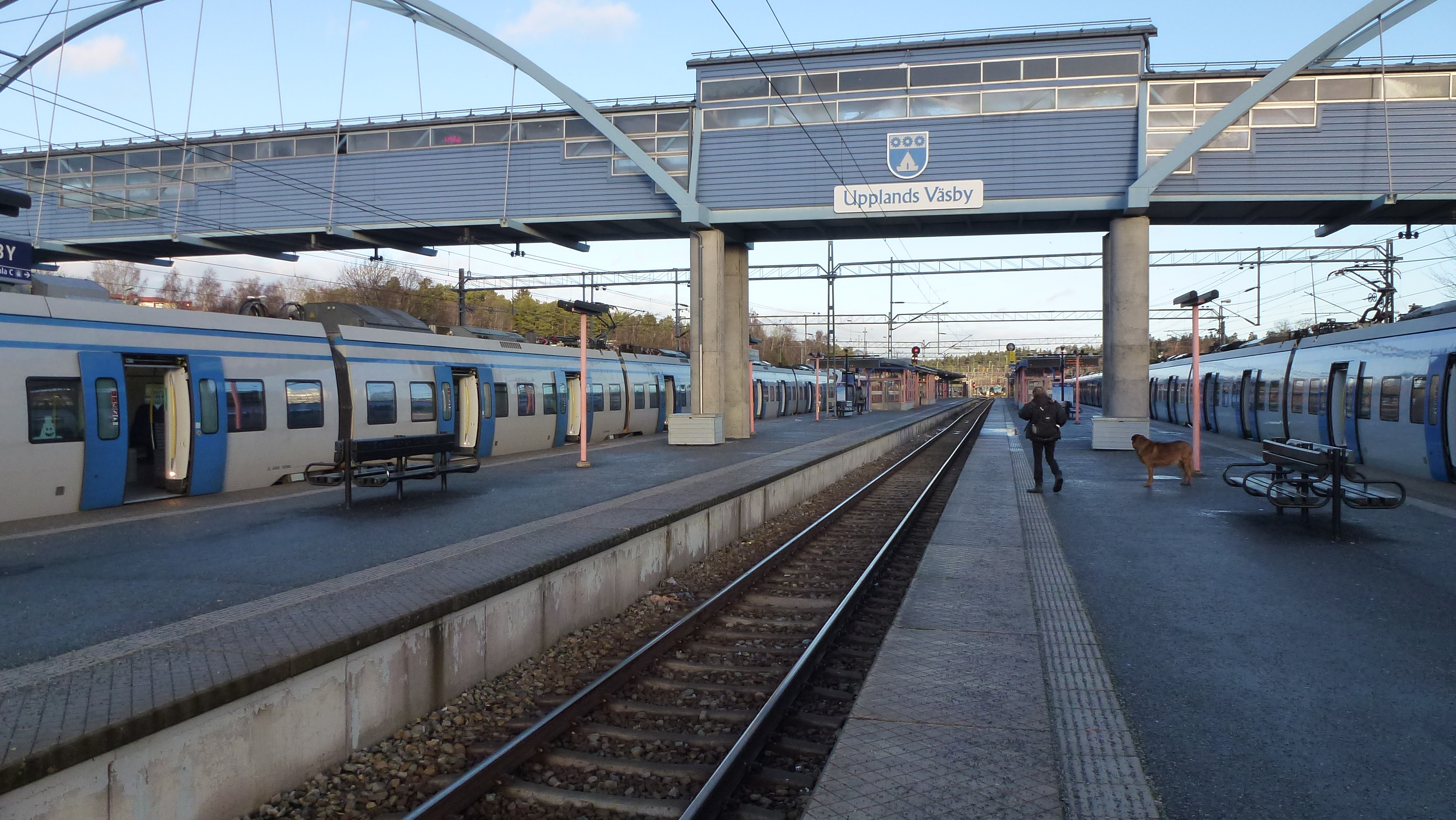

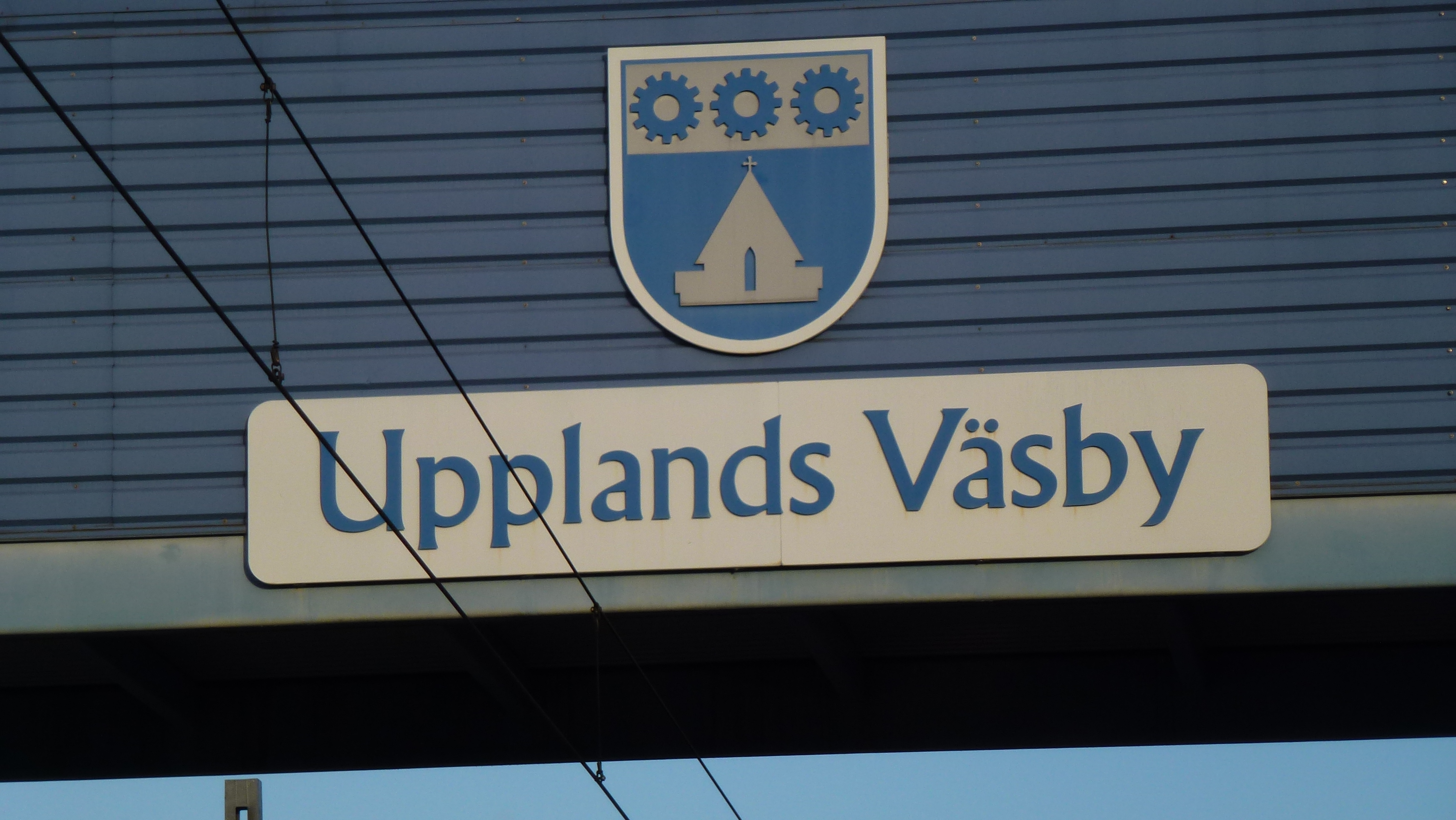

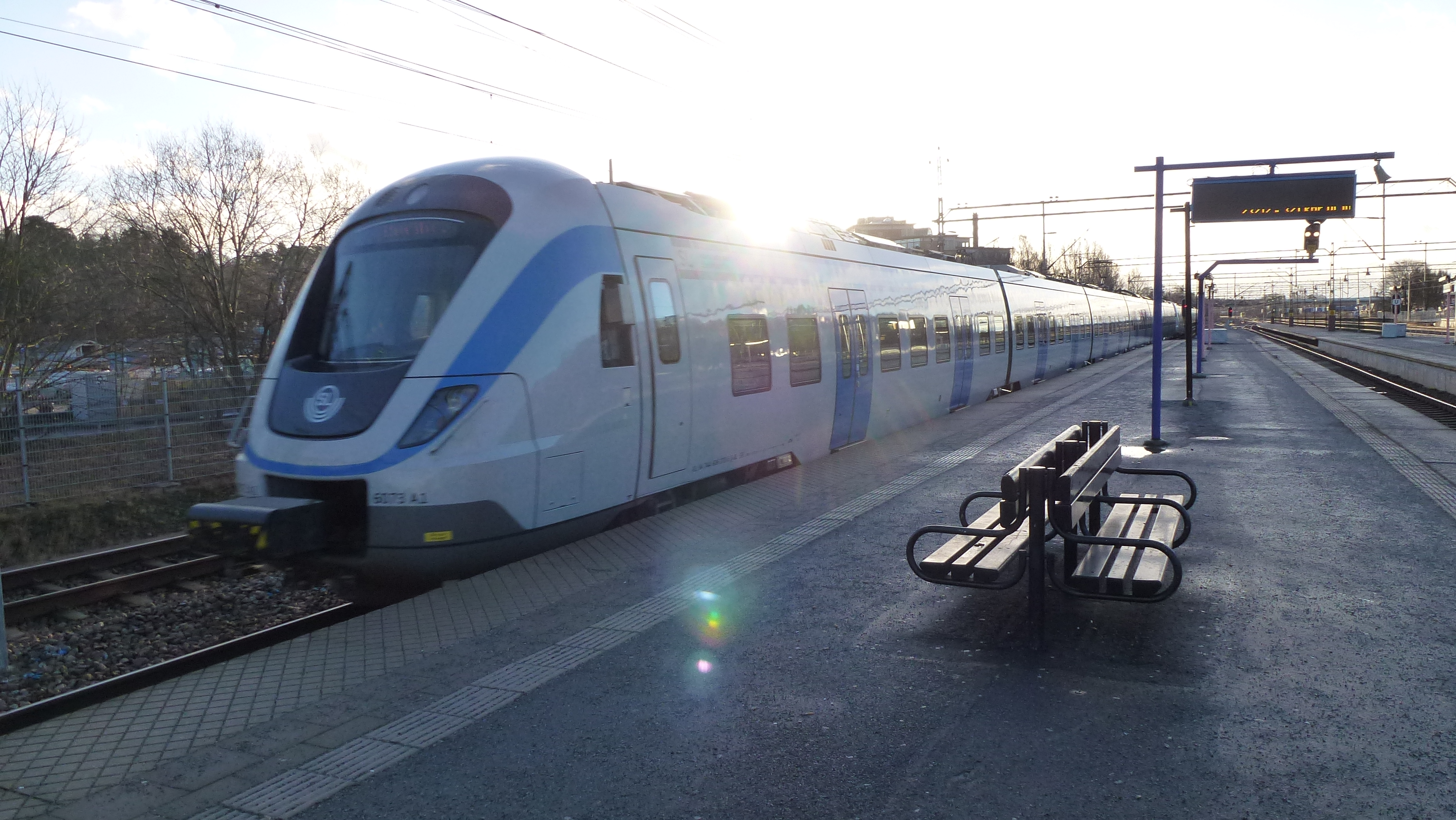

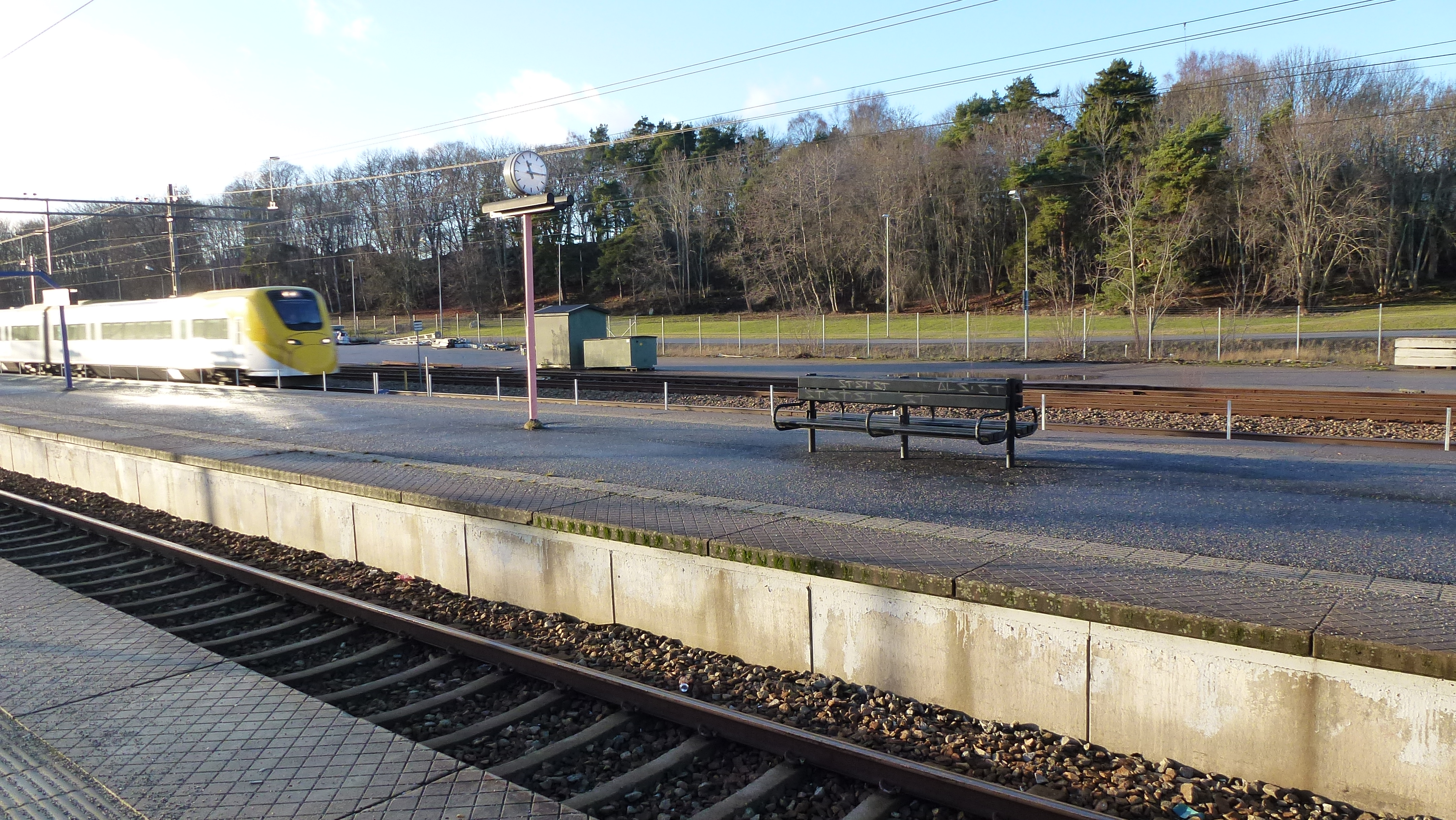

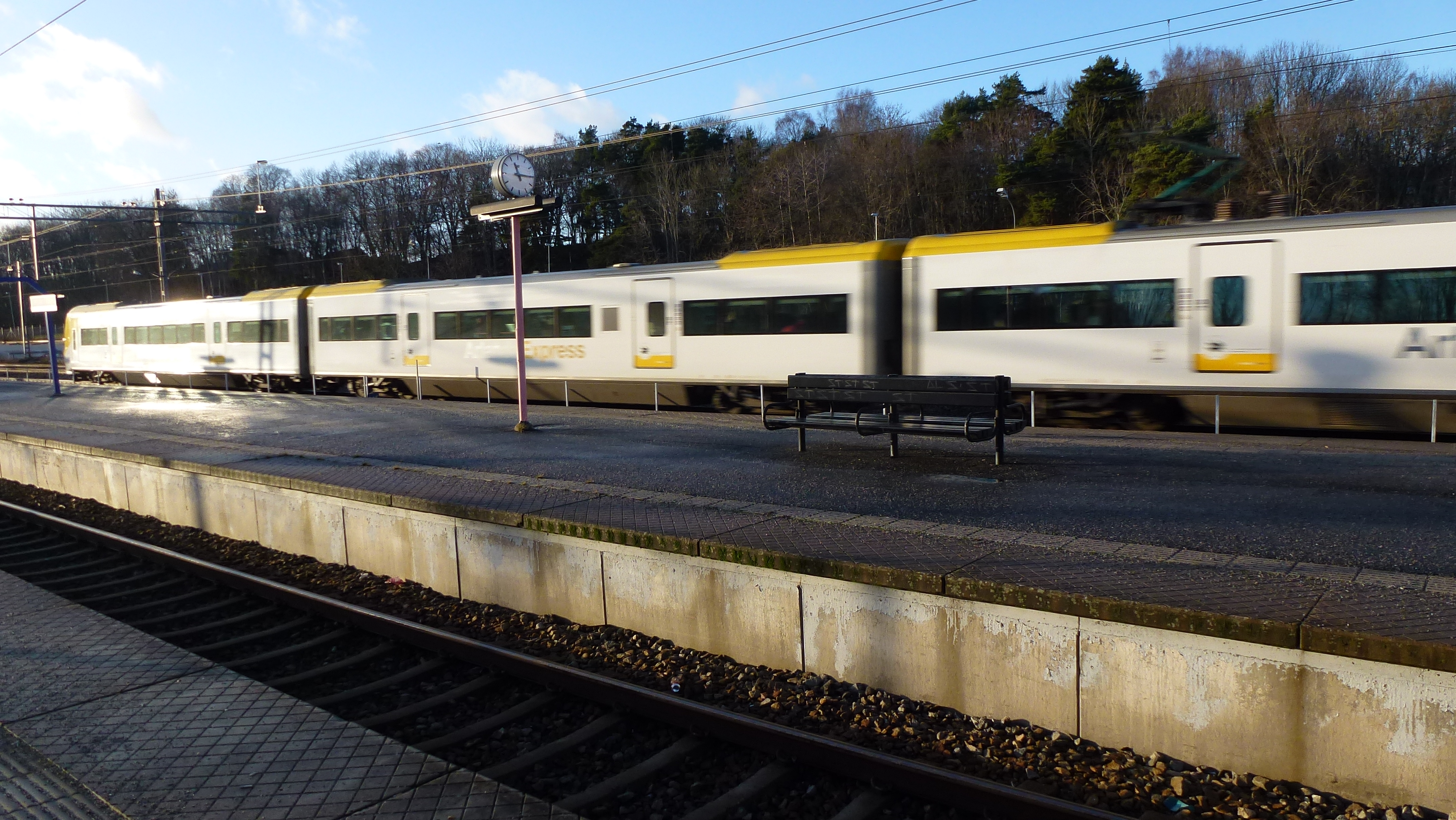

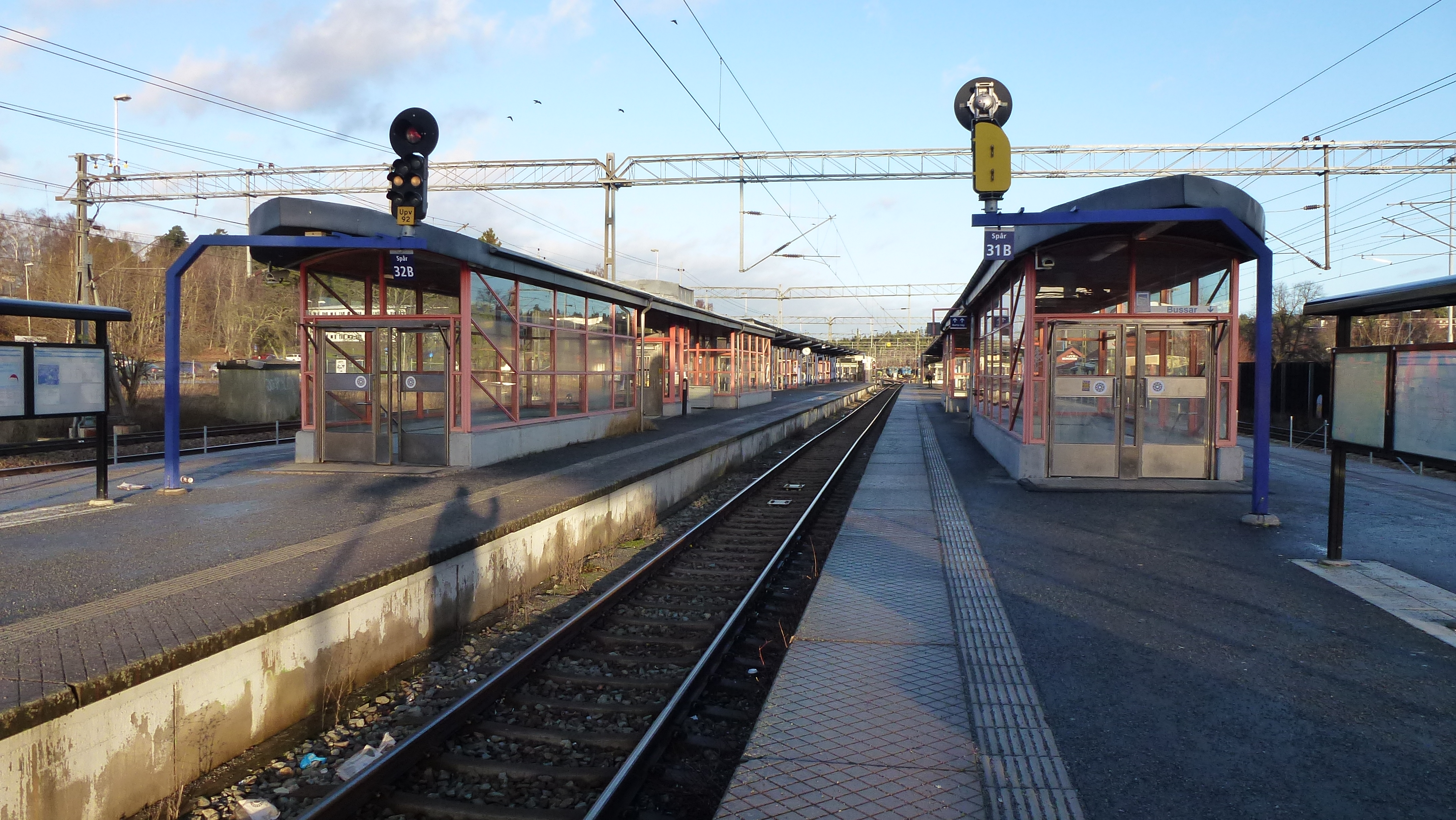

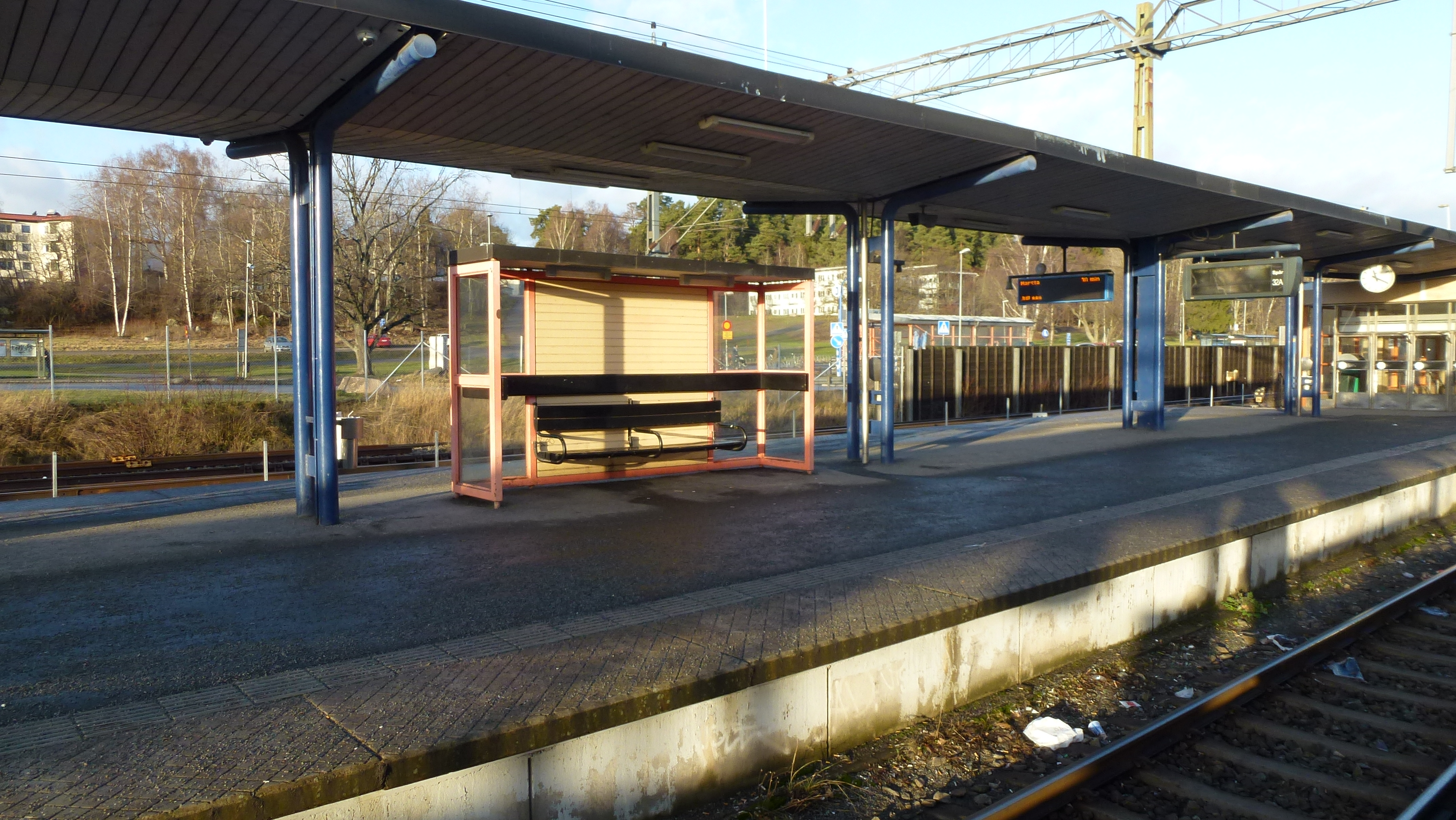

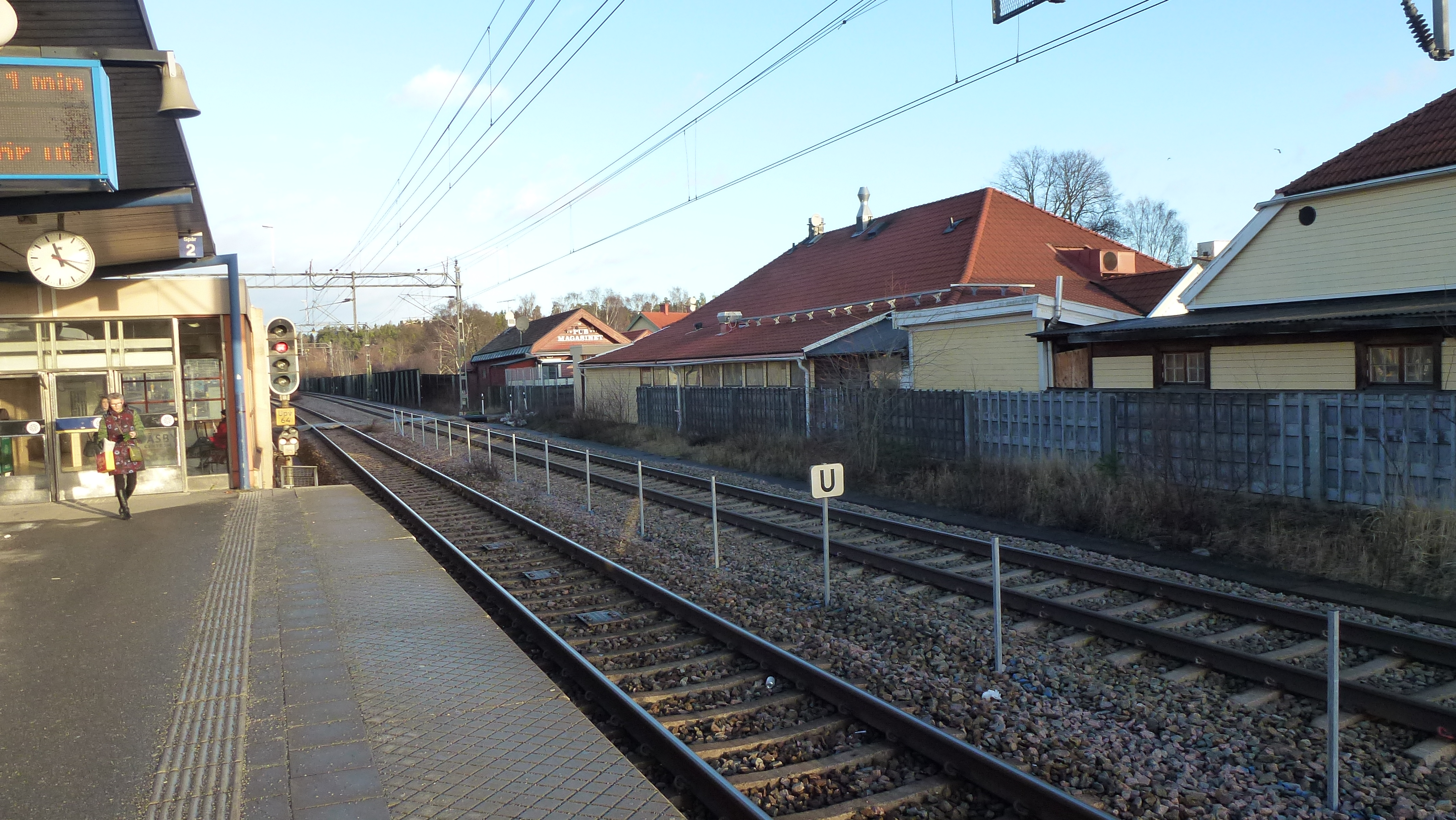

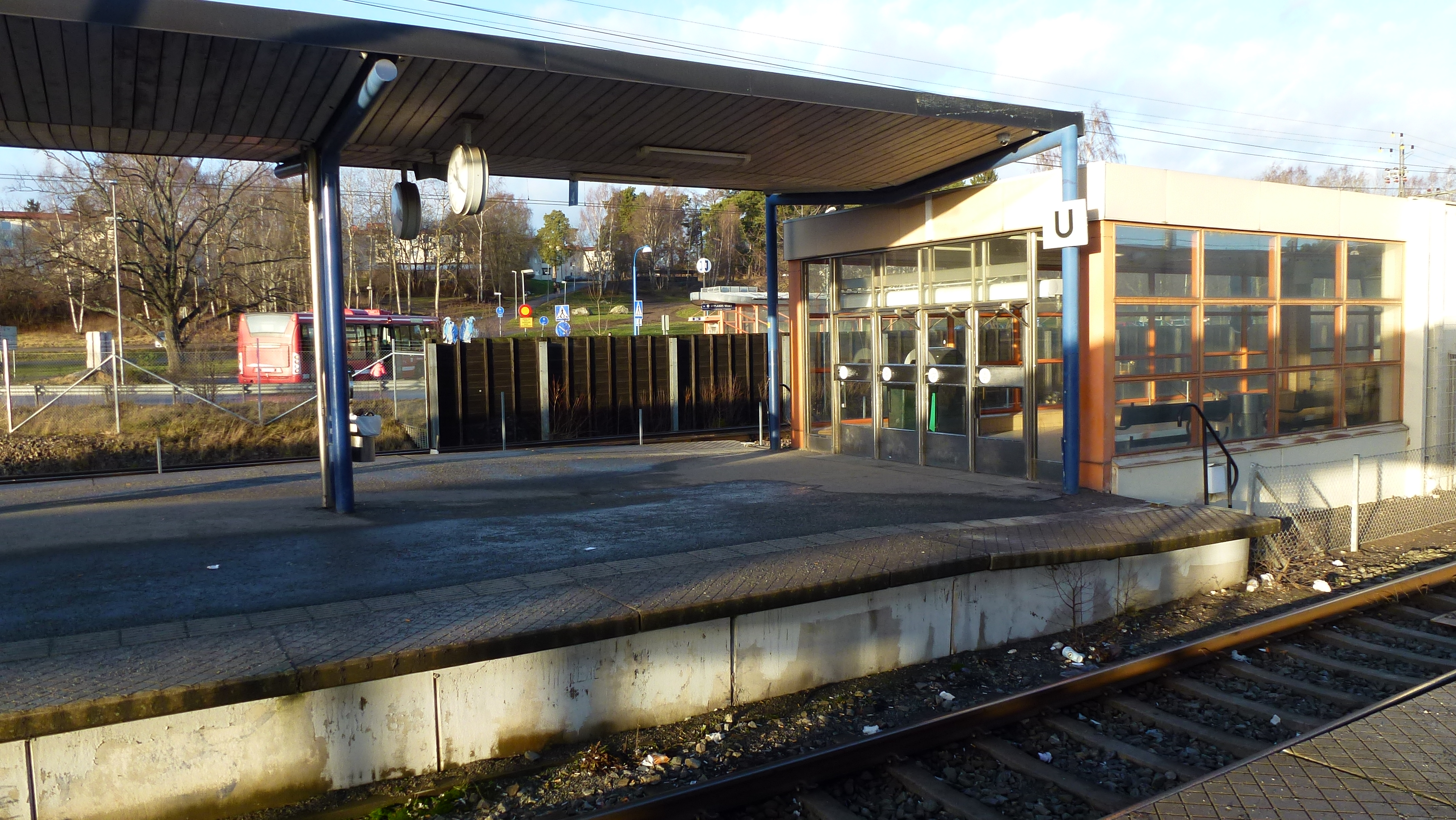

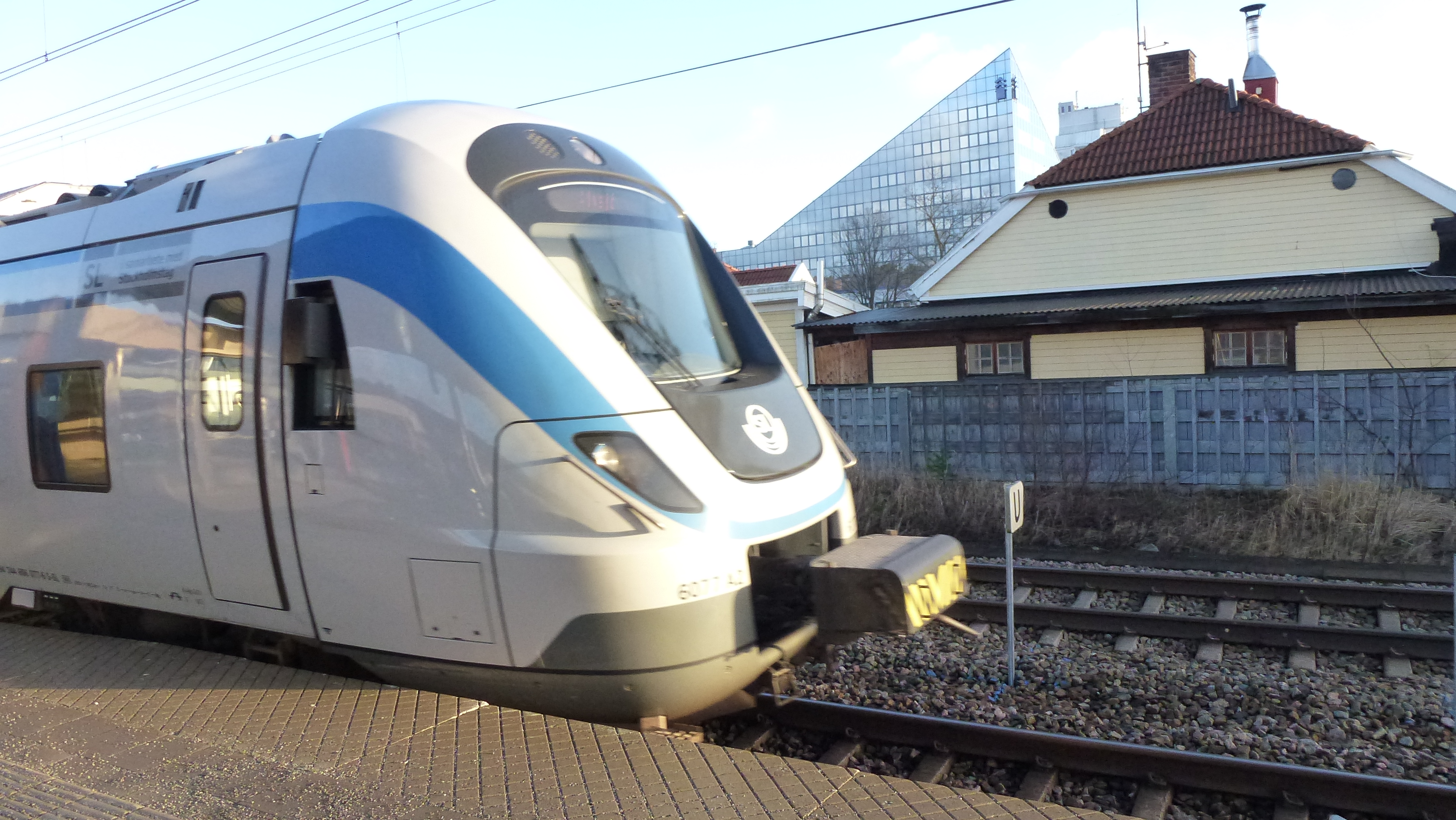

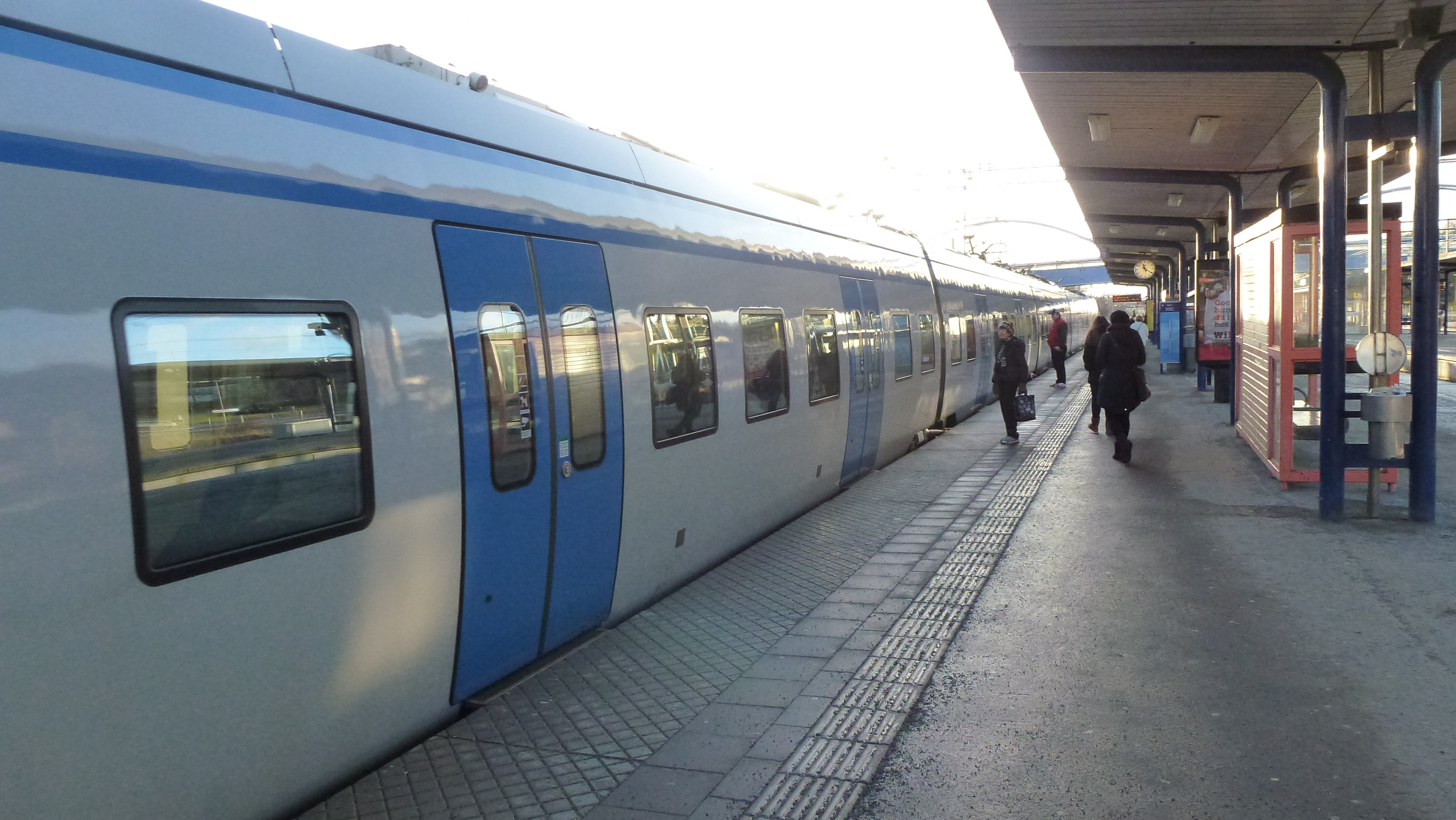

== Bibliography ==
- Hällqvist, Arne (2008). Pendeltåg i stockholmsområdet. TNF bok; 62. Trafik-Nostalgiska Förlaget. ISBN 978-91-85305-65-0. LIBRIS: 10672321.
- Harlén, Hans (2016). Pendeltågen. TNF bok; 217. Trafik-Nostalgiska Förlaget. ISBN 978-91-87695-49-0.
