= Rotebro railway station =

Railway station in Sollentuna, Sweden

Rotebro
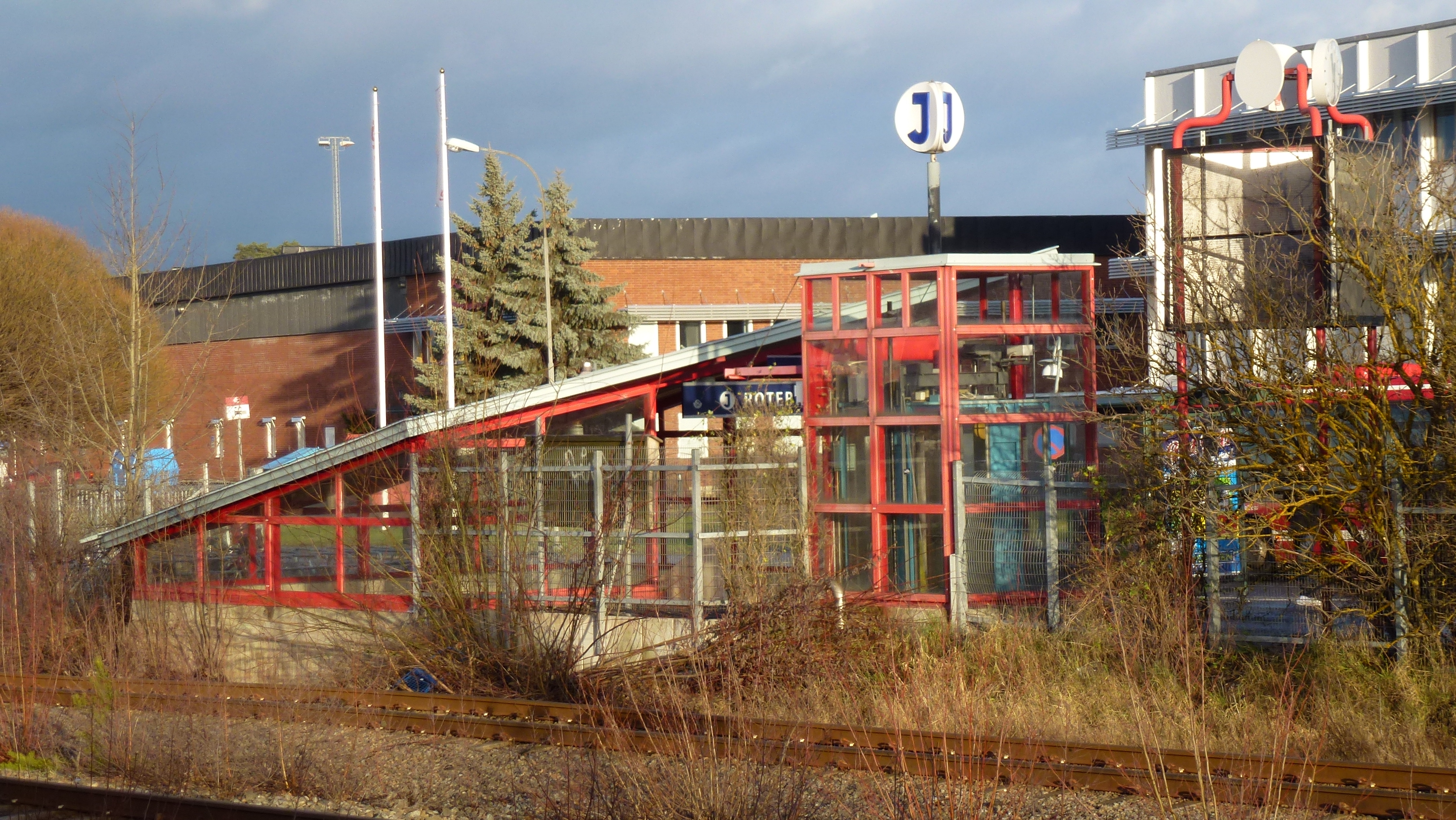

General information
- Location: Stockholm County
- Coordinates: 59.4672°N 17.9181°E
- System: Pendeltåg
- Owner: Swedish Transport Administration
- Platforms: Island Platform
- Tracks: 4
- Connections: Bus terminal

Construction
- Structure type: At-grade

Other information
- Station code: R

History
- Opened: 1866
- Rebuilt: 1968

Passengers
- 2011: 3,700 boarding per weekday (commuter rail)

Services
Preceding station	Stockholm commuter rail	Following station
Upplands Väsby towards Uppsala C	40	Norrviken towards Södertälje Centrum
Upplands Väsby towards Märsta	41	Norrviken towards Södertälje Centrum
Upplands Väsby towards Märsta	42X	Norrviken towards Nynäshamn
Location

Rotebro is a station on Stockholm's commuter rail network, located 19 km north of Stockholm Central Station. The station consists of a single island platform and has two entrance halls. As of 2011, the station had approximately 3,700 boardings per weekday.

== History ==
The original station opened in 1866 when the Northern Main Line (now part of the Ostkustbanan) was inaugurated between Stockholm and Uppsala. This was the first railway station in Sollentuna Municipality, later followed by Tureberg and Norrviken.

Several station buildings have existed at this location. The first was destroyed by fire in 1877. A second brick station building was constructed but was demolished in 1968 and replaced with a ticket hall on the platform.

A freight track to the nearby Jästbolaget yeast factory is still in operation.

== Gallery ==
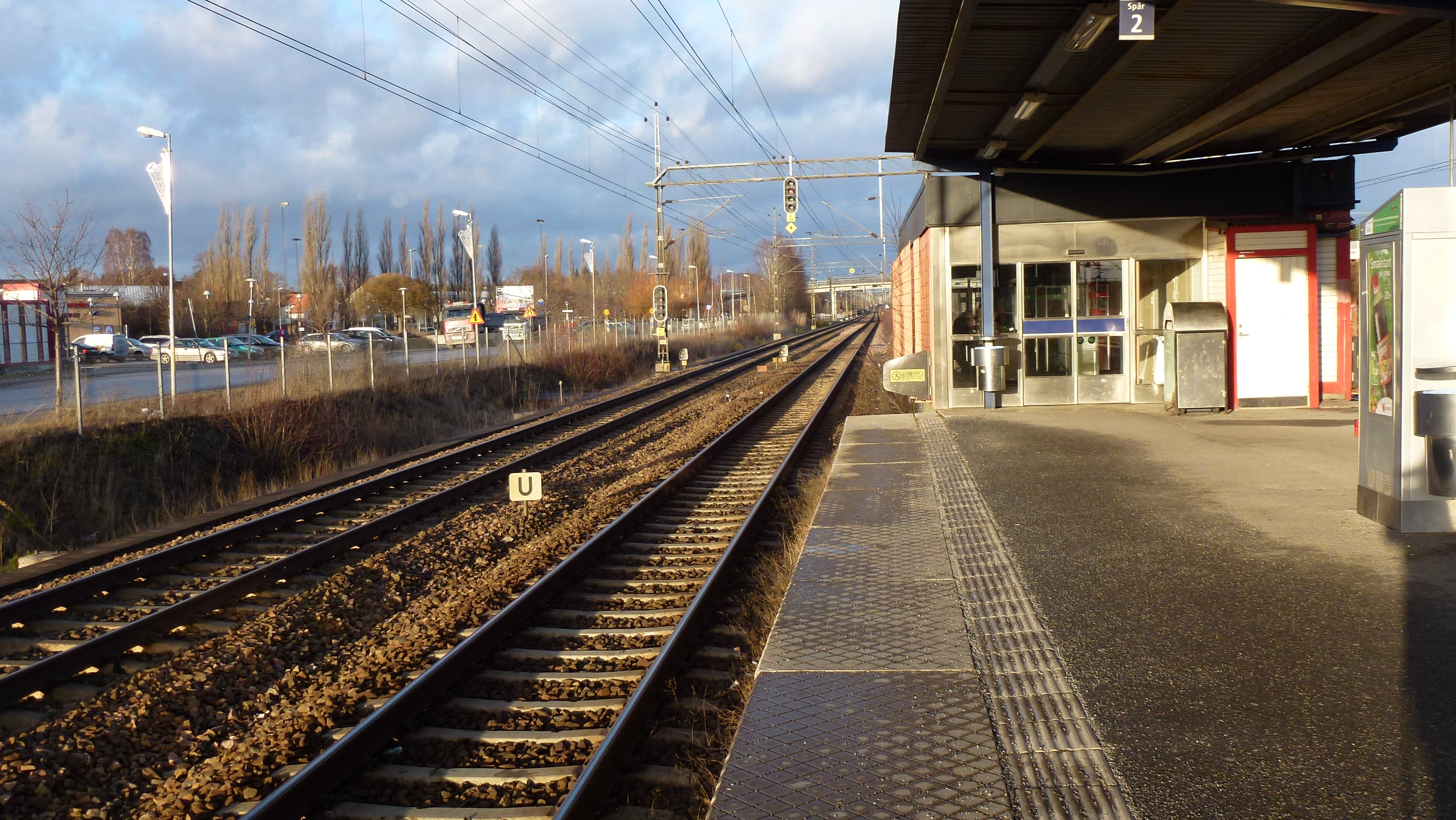

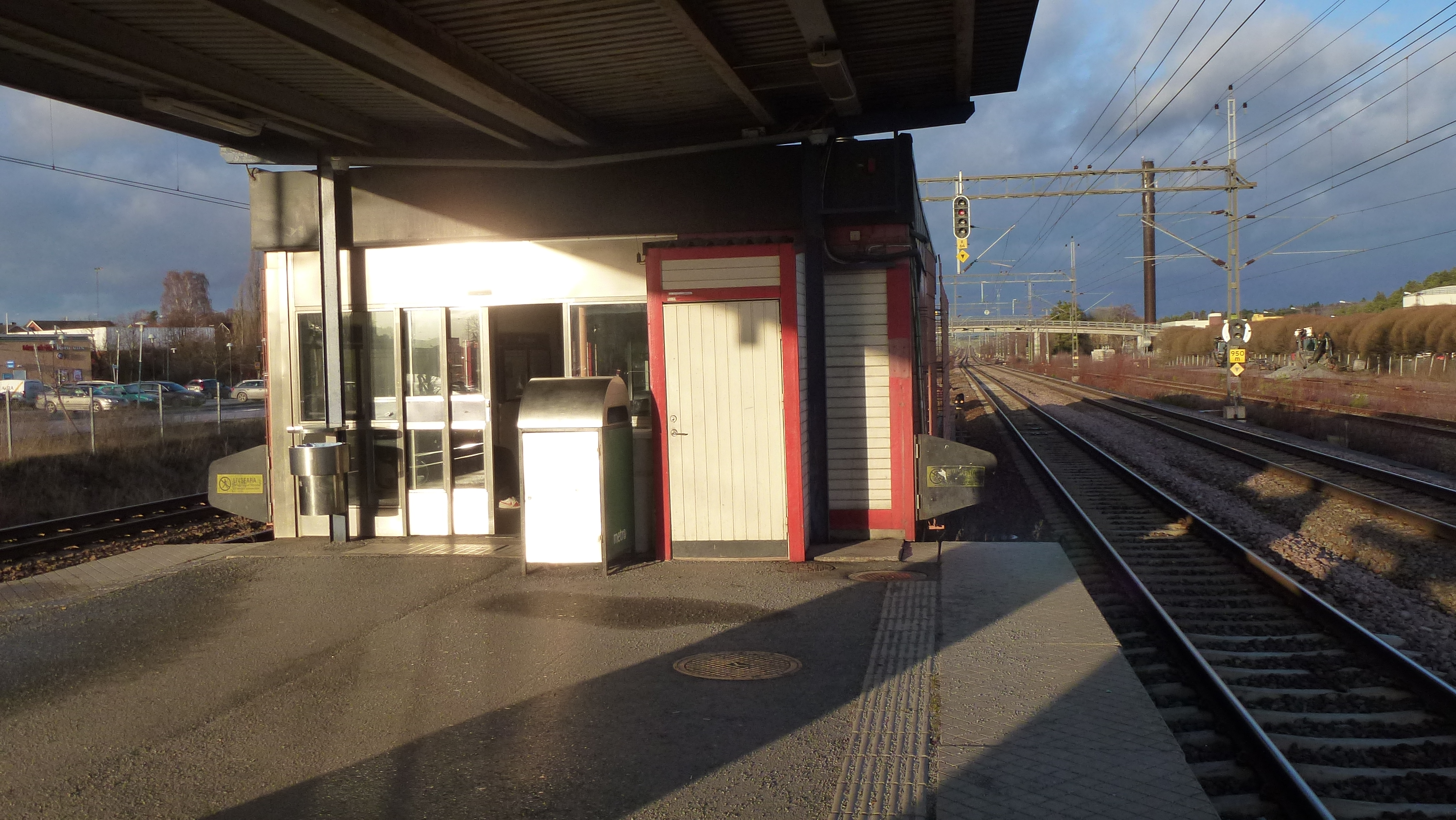

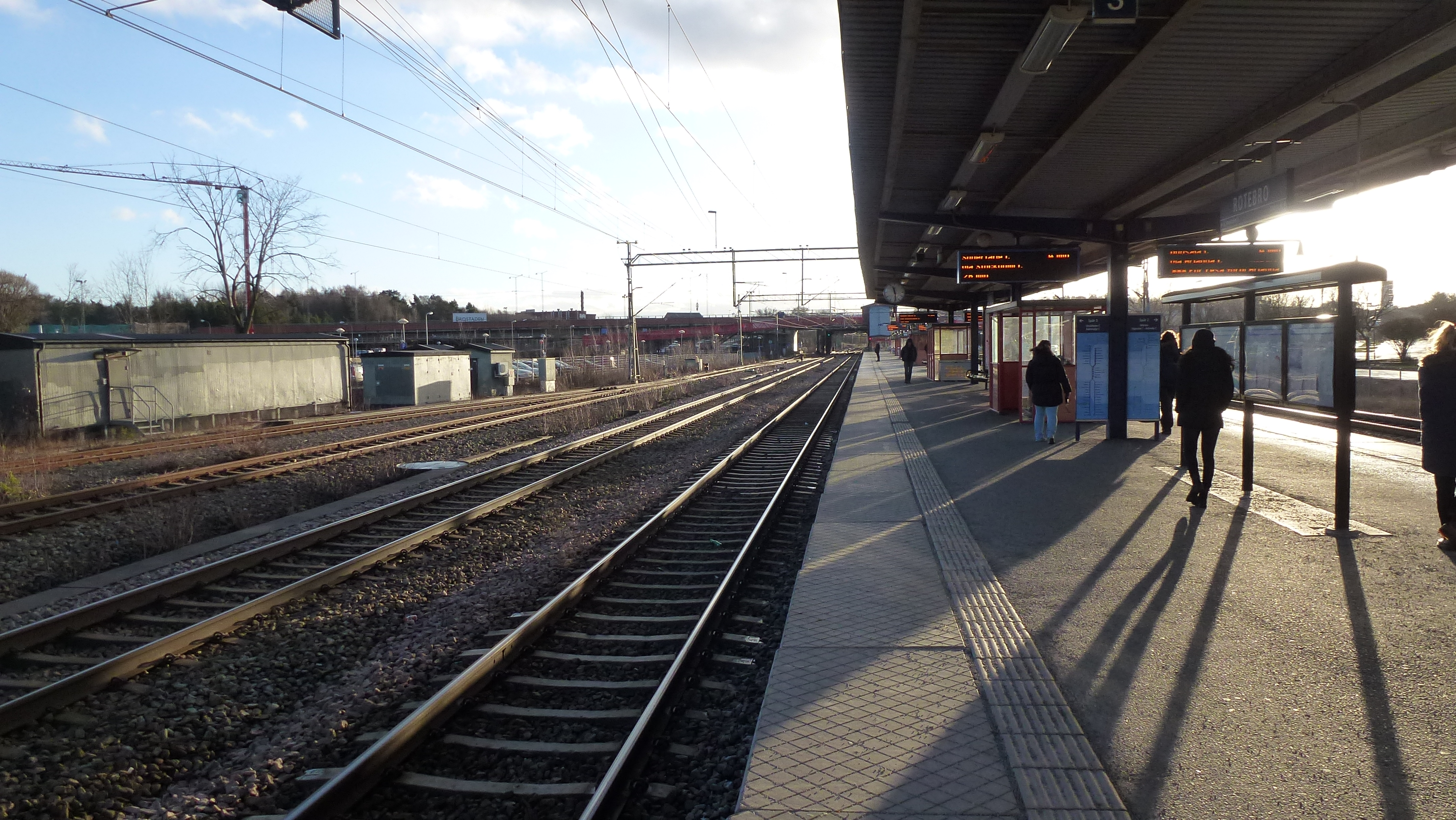
