= Rosersberg railway station =

Railway station in Sigtuna, Sweden

Rosersberg
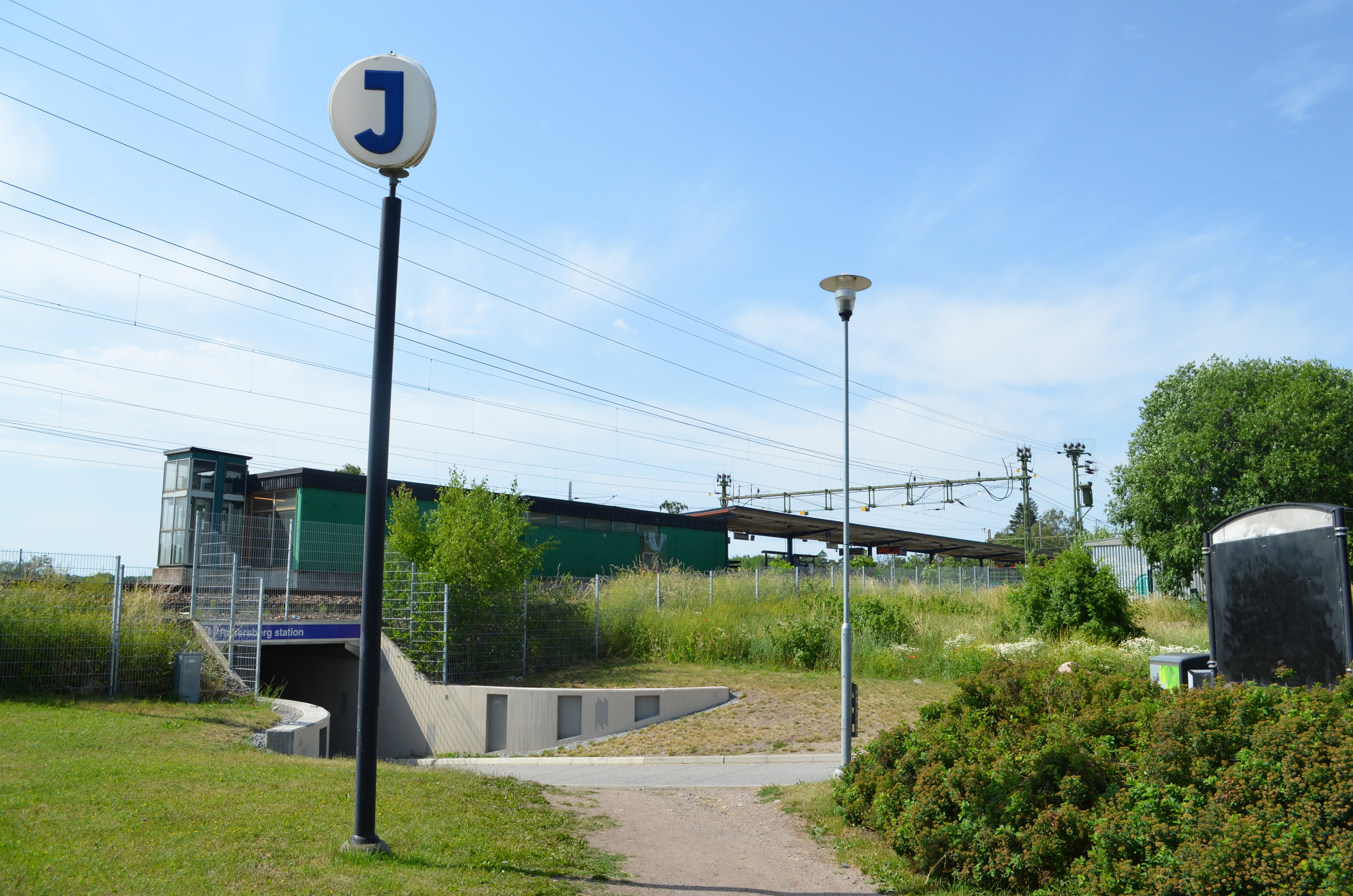
- Rosersberg station

General information
- Location: Rosersberg, Sigtuna Municipality, Sweden; Sweden
- Coordinates: 59°35′2″N 17°52′53″E
- System: Pendeltåg
- Owner: Trafikverket
- Operator: Storstockholms Lokaltrafik
- Line: Ostkustbanan
- Platforms: 1 (island platform)
- Tracks: 2
- Connections: Bus terminal

Construction
- Structure type: At-grade
- Accessible: yes

Other information
- Station code: Rs

History
- Opened: 1866
- Rebuilt: 1967, 1980s

Passengers
- 1,200 daily

Services
| Preceding station | Stockholm commuter rail | Following station |
|---|---|---|
| Märsta Terminus | 41 | Upplands Väsby towards Södertälje centrum |
| Märsta Terminus | 42X | Upplands Väsby towards Nynäshamn |
Location

Rosersberg is a station on the Stockholm commuter rail network, located on the Märsta branch in the locality of Rosersberg, Sigtuna Municipality, approximately 31.4 km from Stockholm City railway station. The station features a central island platform with an entrance from an underground pedestrian tunnel. In winter 2015, the station had approximately 1,200 boarding passengers on an average weekday.

== History ==
The original station opened in 1866, when the Northern Main Line (now part of the Ostkustbanan) was inaugurated. It was originally served by trains to Uppsala. Some of Stockholm’s SJ suburban trains, which previously had their northern terminus at Upplands Väsby, were extended to Märsta in the 1940s.

In 1967, SL took over responsibility for local passenger traffic within Stockholm County, and modern commuter rail services were introduced, leading to a station upgrade. Further renovations were carried out in the 1980s.

== Gallery ==
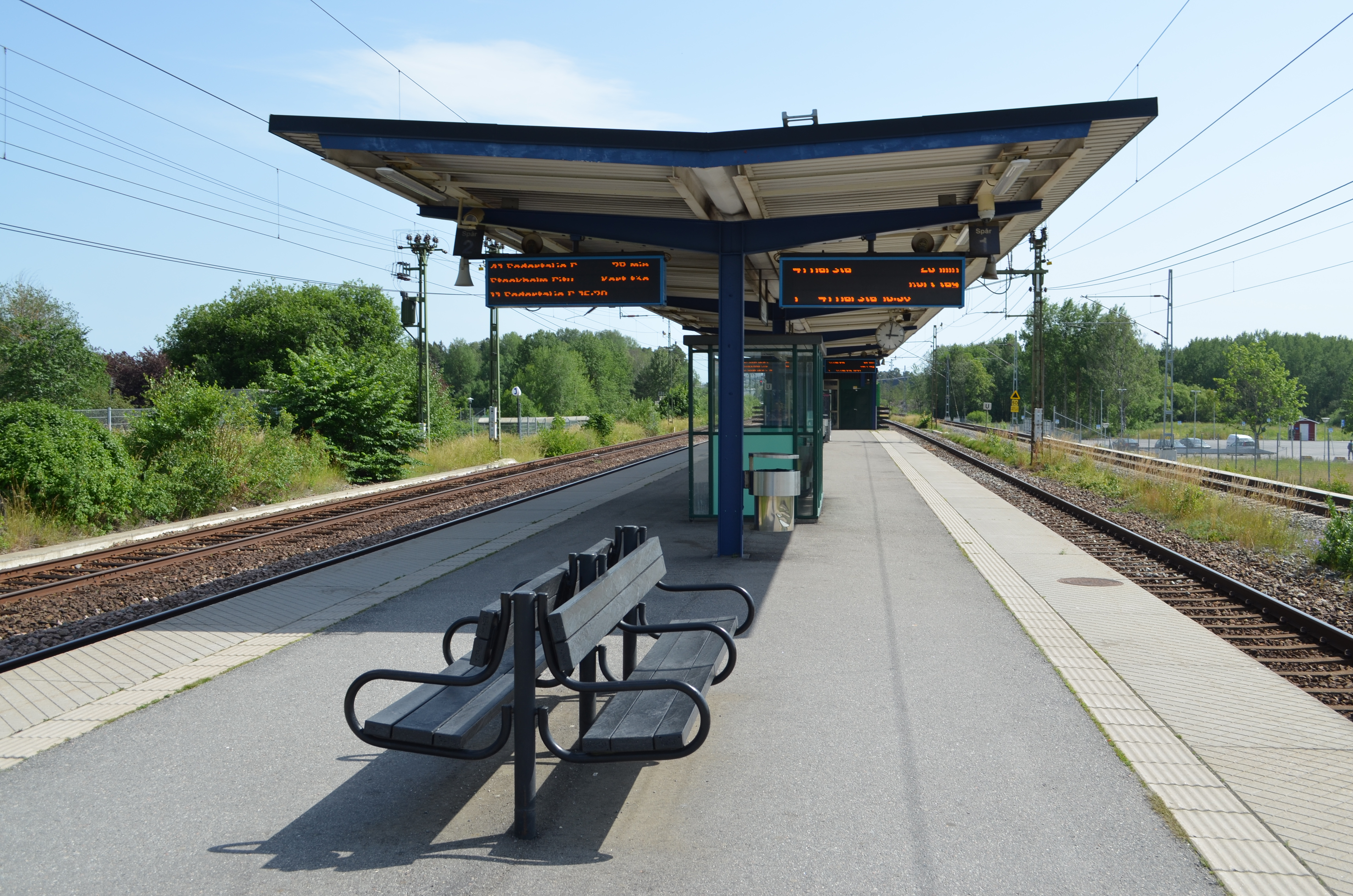
Platform

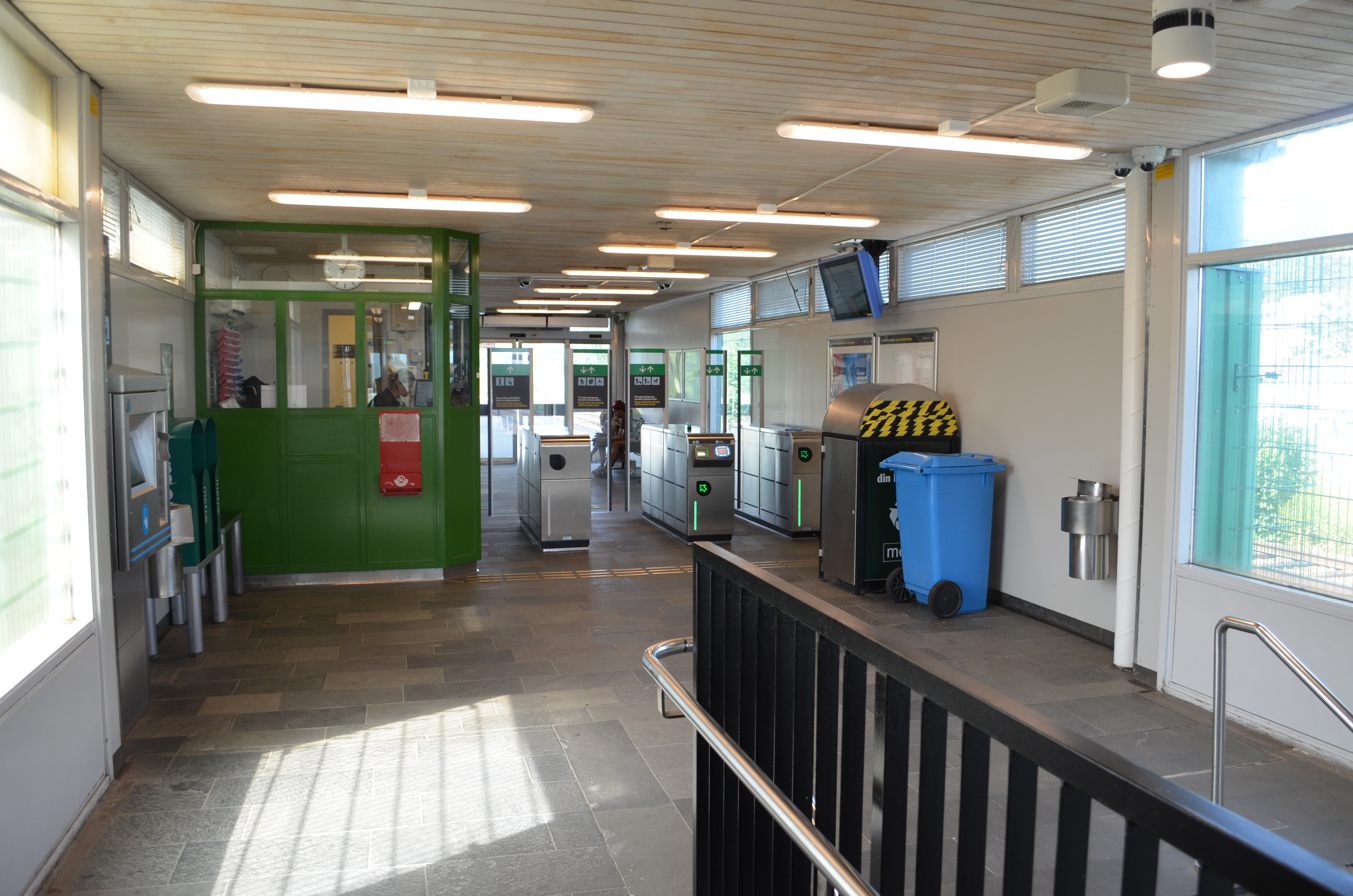
Ticket hall

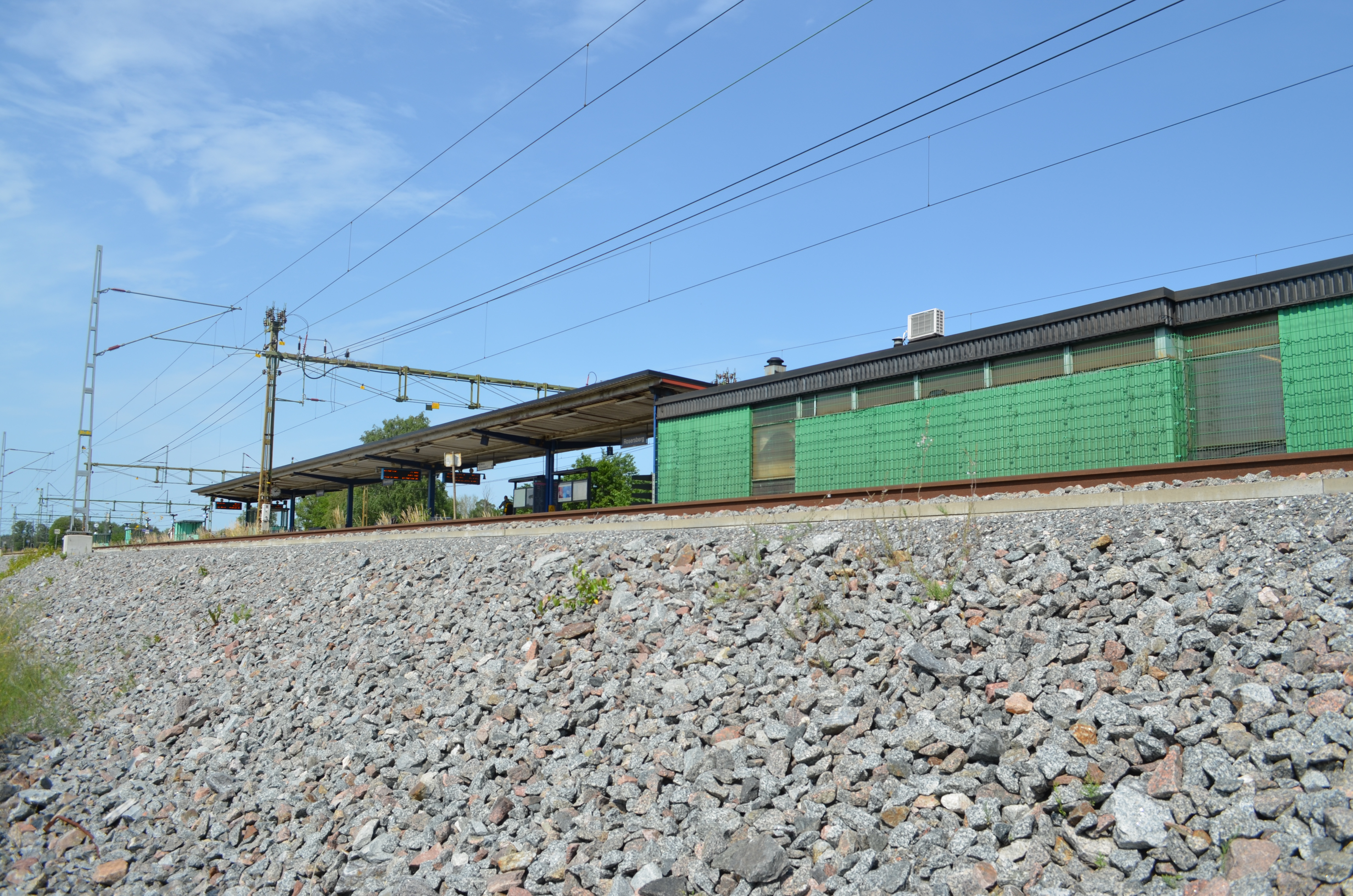
The station

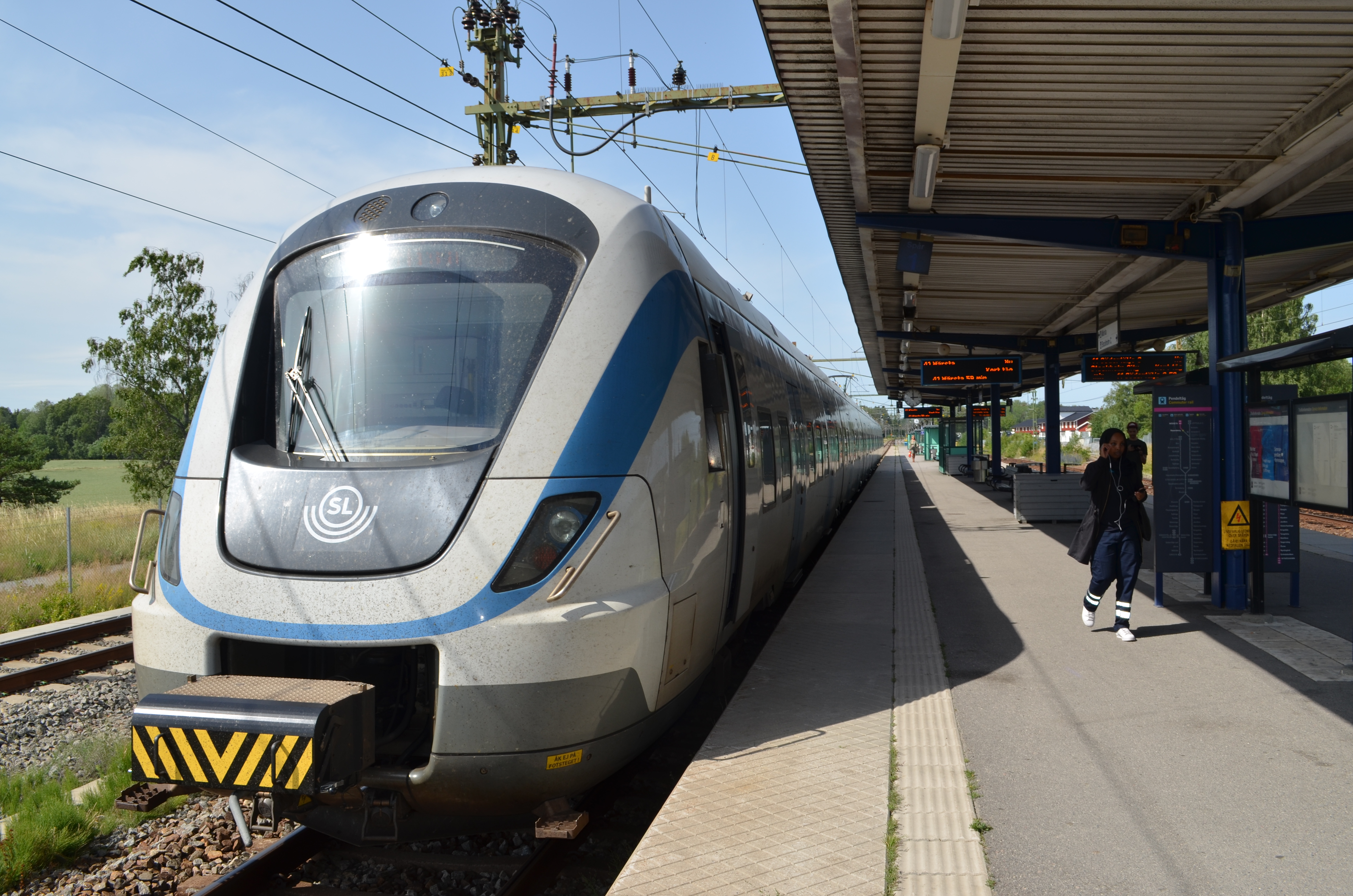
X60 commuter train at the station

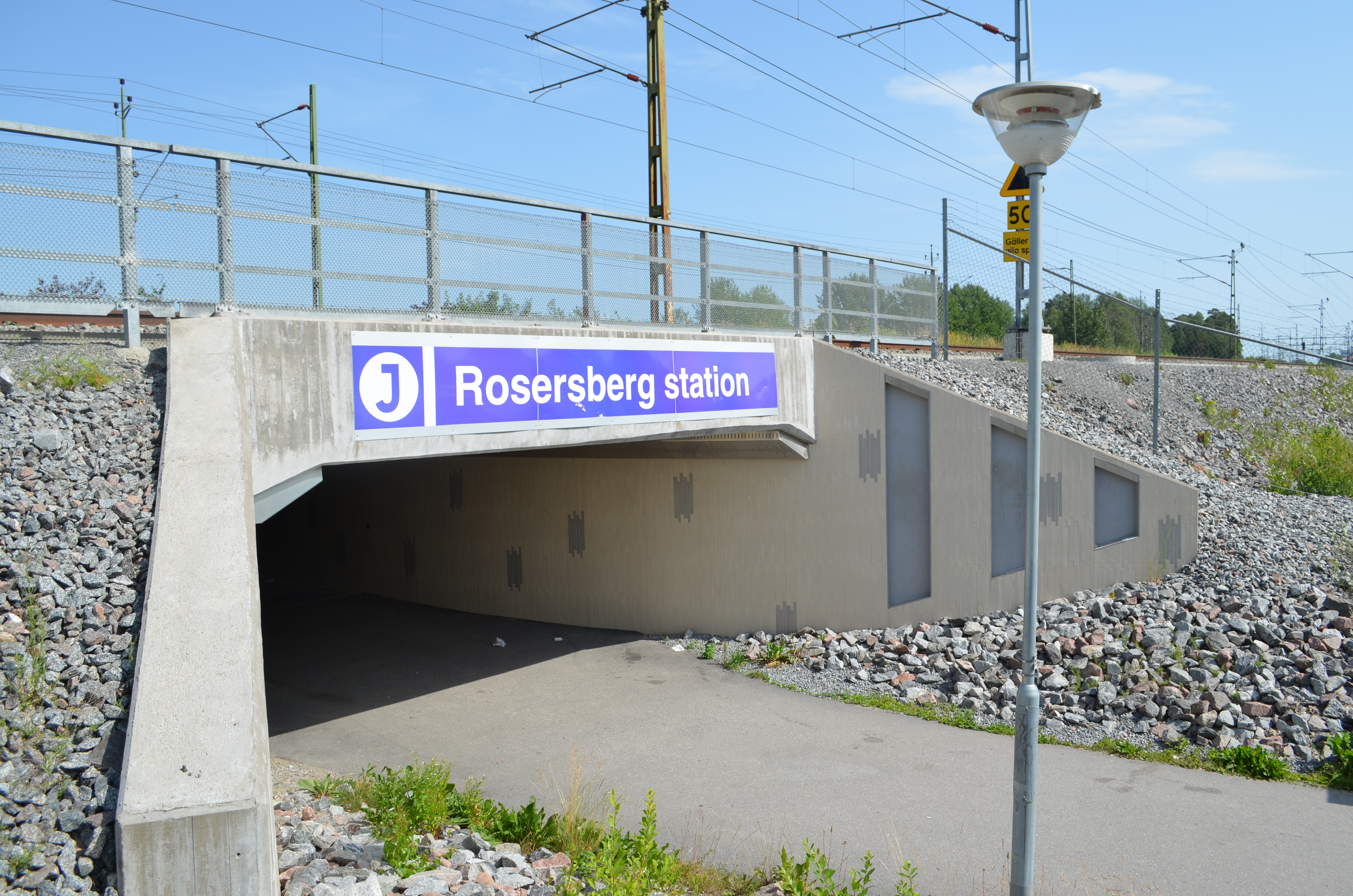
Entrance

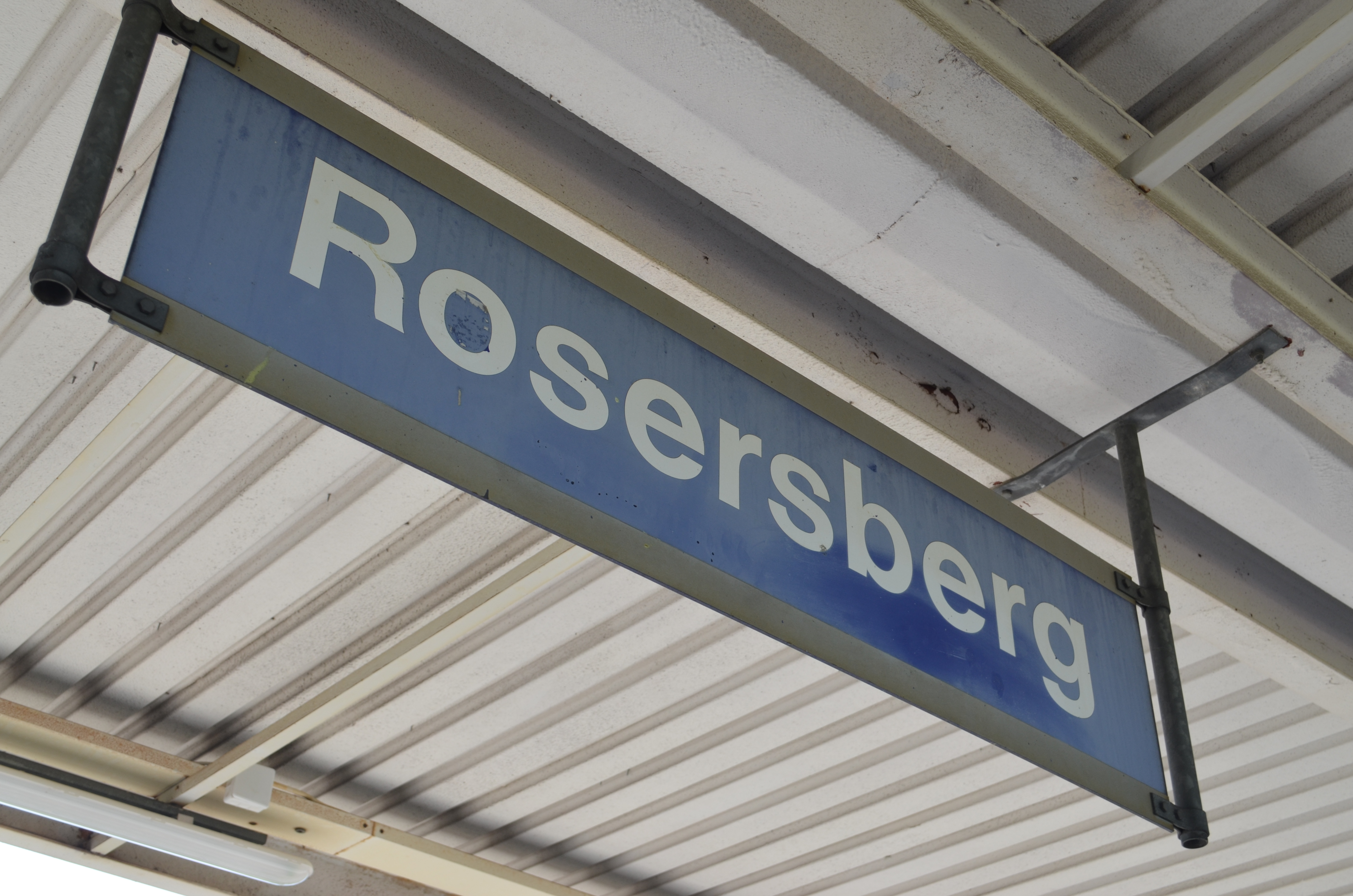
Station sign
