= Saint Olaf's chapel =

Coordinates: 59°3′1.5″N 15°2′1.2″E

Saint Olafs Chapel
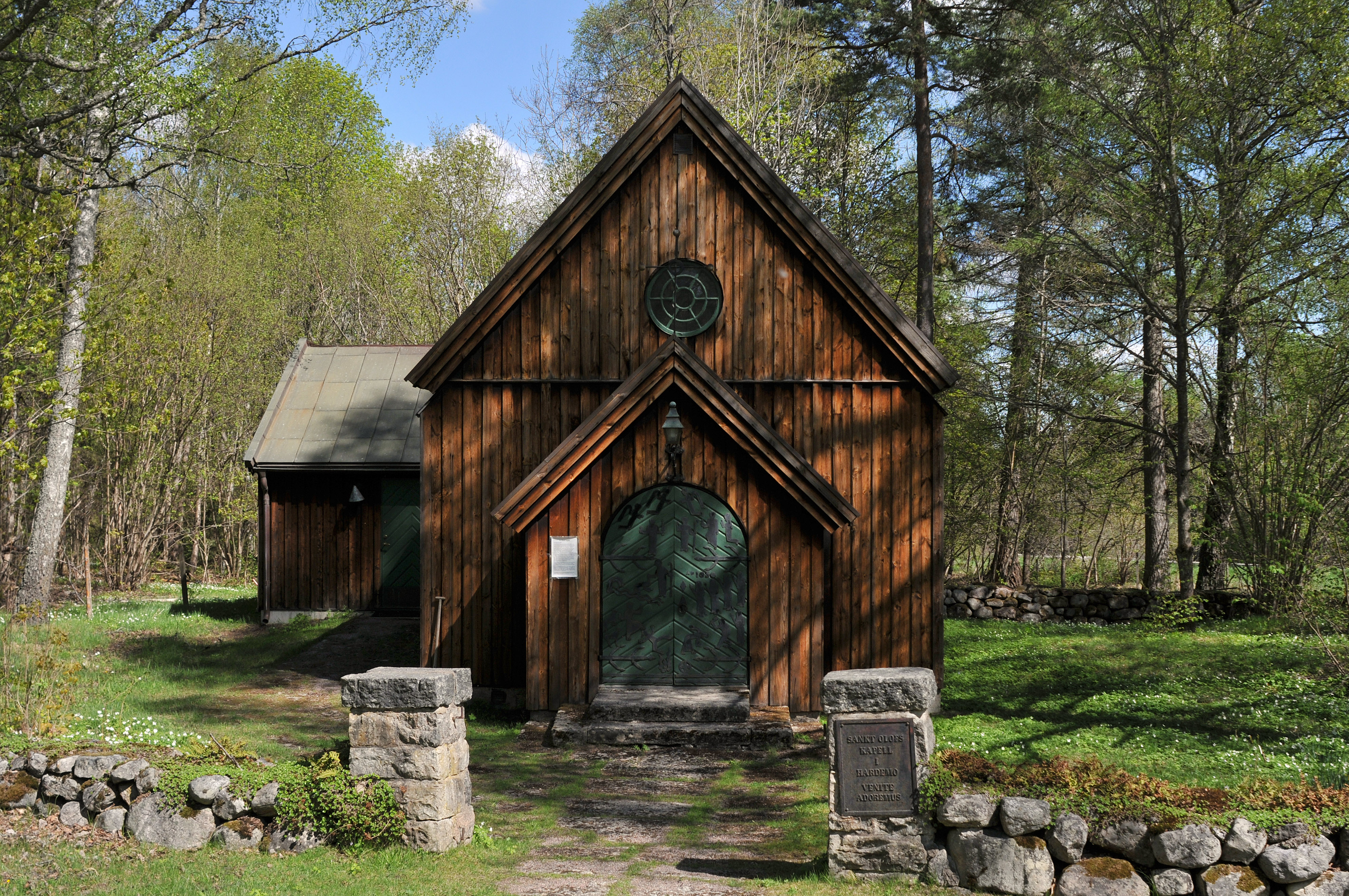
- Saint Olafs Chapel
- Location: Örebro County
- Country: Sweden
- Denomination: Church of Sweden

History
- Dedication: Saint Olaf

Architecture
- Functional status: Active

Administration
- Diocese: Diocese of Strängnäs

Saint Olaf's chapel is a chapel in Kumla, Närke, Svealand in Sweden.

The wooden chapel was built in 1935 after drawings by architect Karl Martin Westerberg. It was restored in 1969–1970.

About 250 meters north of the church is Saint Olaf's well (S:t Olofs källa), near a signpost with the note: "You travelling man on your road, come forth and drink, you get strength, as (in) the water the power resides, like in the times of Saint Olaf", (Du vandringsman på vägen går, kom hit och drick, du styrka får, ty vattnet äger samma kraft, det i S:t Olofs tid har haft, — in Swedish).
