= Hållandsgårdens stave church =

Replica of a stave church in Sweden

Hållandsgårdens stave church is a replica of a stave church in Åre Municipality, Jämtland County, Sweden.

The church was built in 1999 by visitors at the hotel where it is situated. It is built from the remains of three old barns and a stable.

The specializes in modern pilgrimage in the mountains of Åre, an activity which has become very popular in Sweden in later years.
