= Sollentuna railway station =

Railway station in Sollentuna, Sweden

Sollentuna
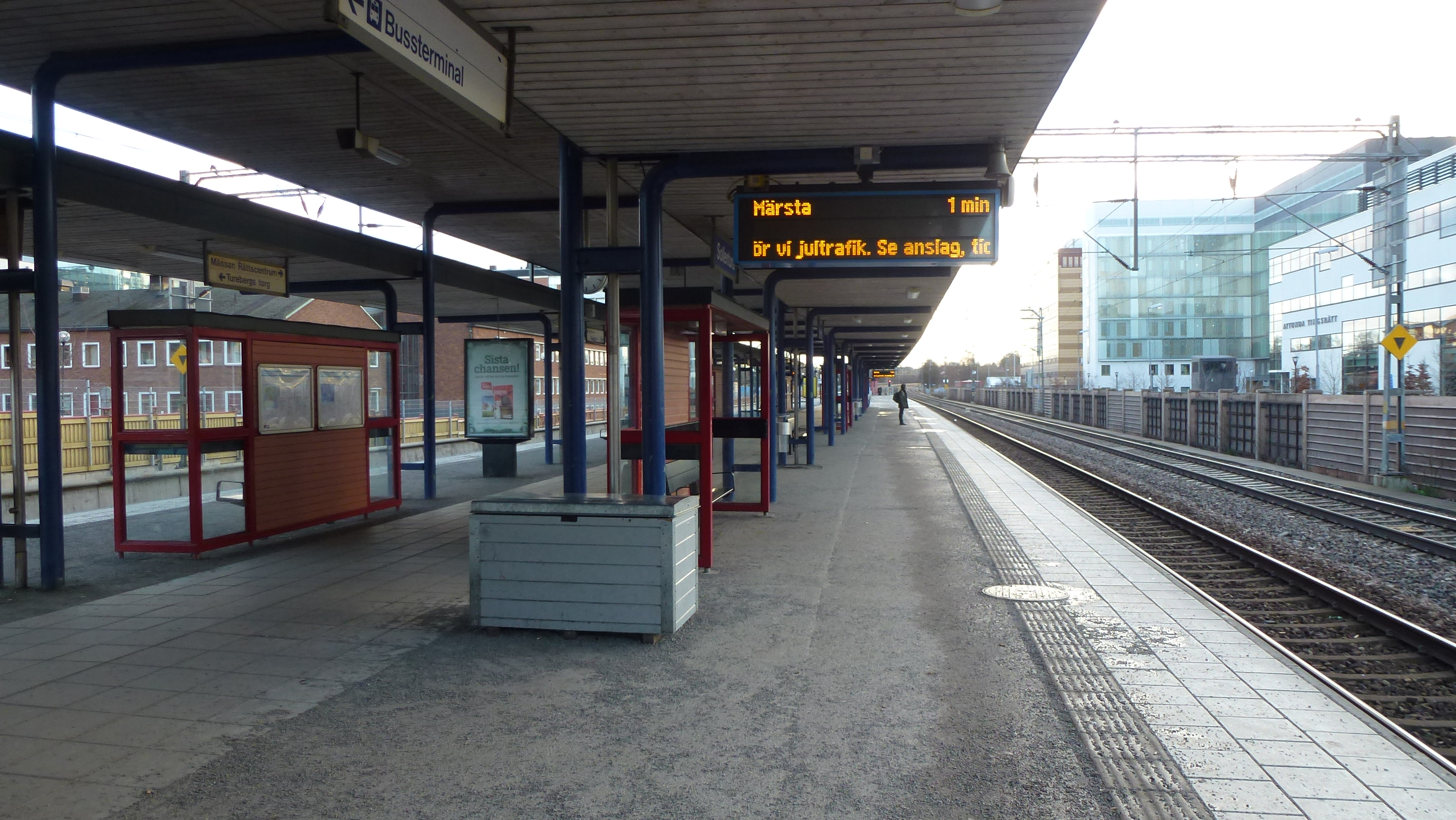
- Platforms at Sollentuna station

General information
- Location: Sollentuna Municipality; Stockholm County; Sweden
- Coordinates: 59°25′42″N 17°56′55″E
- Line: East Coast Line
- Train operators: Storstockholms Lokaltrafik

History
- Opened: 1866

Passengers
- 2019: 13,400 boarding per weekday

Services
Preceding station	Stockholm commuter rail	Following station
Häggvik towards Uppsala C	40	Helenelund towards Södertälje Centrum
Häggvik towards Märsta	41	Helenelund towards Södertälje Centrum
Häggvik towards Märsta	42X	Helenelund towards Nynäshamn
Location

Sollentuna is one of the five stations of the Stockholm commuter rail in Sollentuna Municipality. It is situated in the neighbourhood of Tureberg 13.3 km north of Stockholm Central Station. The station was originally called Tureberg and was opened in 1866 in a rural setting along the railway Stockholm–Uppsala. The name was changed to Sollentuna in 1968 at the request of the municipality, since Tureberg is the de facto centre of the municipality. The area around the station has developed into a suburban centre with high rise buildings, a bus terminal and a large shopping mall.
