= Häggvik railway station =

Railway station in Sollentuna, Sweden

Häggvik
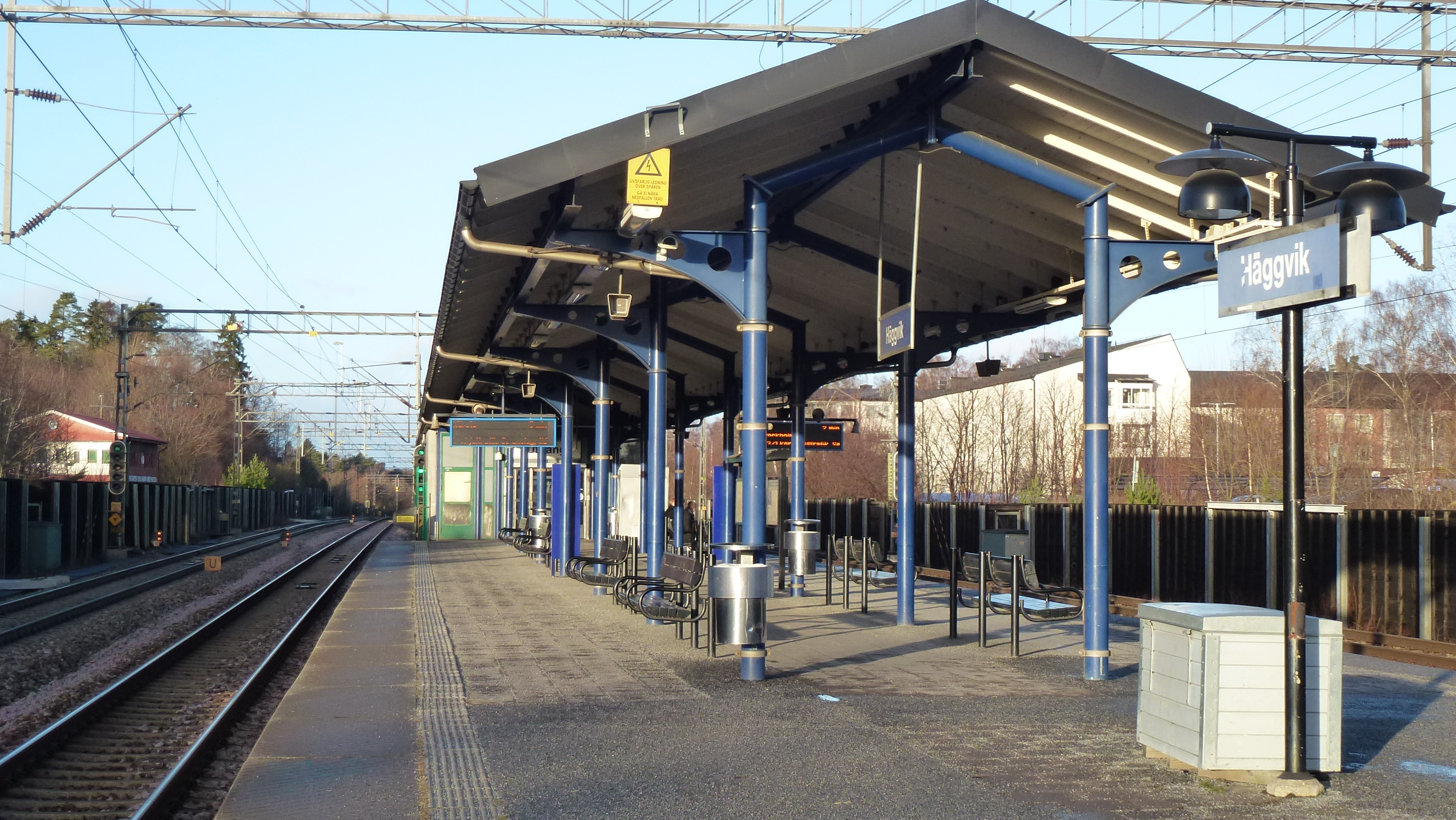

General information
- Location: Stockholm County
- Coordinates: 59.4482°N 17.9289°E
- System: Pendeltåg
- Owner: Swedish Transport Administration
- Platforms: Island Platform
- Tracks: 4
- Connections: Bus terminal

Construction
- Structure type: At-grade

Other information
- Station code: Hgv

History
- Opened: 1932 (current station 1996)

Passengers
- 2011: 2,200 boarding per weekday (2011) (commuter rail)

Services
Preceding station	Stockholm commuter rail	Following station
Norrviken towards Uppsala C	40	Sollentuna towards Södertälje Centrum
Norrviken towards Märsta	41	Sollentuna towards Södertälje Centrum
Norrviken towards Märsta	42X	Sollentuna towards Nynäshamn
Location

Häggvik is a station on Stockholm's commuter rail network, located 15.3 km north of Stockholm Central Station in the Häggvik district of Sollentuna Municipality. The station consists of a single island platform, with the entrance located at the northern end, accessible via an underground pedestrian tunnel. As of 2011, the station had approximately 2,200 boardings per weekday.

== History ==
The original local train stop on the Northern Main Line (now part of the Ostkustbanan) opened in 1932. The initiative came from local residents, and land was donated to Statens Järnvägar by J. A. O. Häggberg, who had founded the Häggvik community in the early 1900s.

The current station was inaugurated in 1996 as part of an upgrade that expanded the railway to four tracks.

Musician Ted Gärdestad died by suicide at this station on June 22, 1997.

== Southern entrance and former plans for a regional rail station ==
Between 1991 and 1996, the railway was expanded to four tracks on the Ulriksdal–Rosersberg section. During this expansion, a feasibility study was conducted for a regional rail station in Häggvik, under the working name Stockholm Nord or Station Nord.

Häggvik was selected over Ulriksdal, Sörentorp, and Rotebro due to its intersection with the outer ring road. The station was ultimately never built, but the study resulted in a principle agreement to include it in future planning.

Preparations for a potential regional rail station were made during track expansion by widening the bridge at Häggviksleden, allowing for two additional tracks.

The area includes a turnaround track between the four railway tracks. In 2013, a new study by Trafikverket excluded Häggvik as a future regional rail station for economic reasons. By 2021, Sollentuna Municipality removed plans for the regional rail station from its long-term strategy.

A plan for a southern entrance remains under discussion.

== Gallery ==
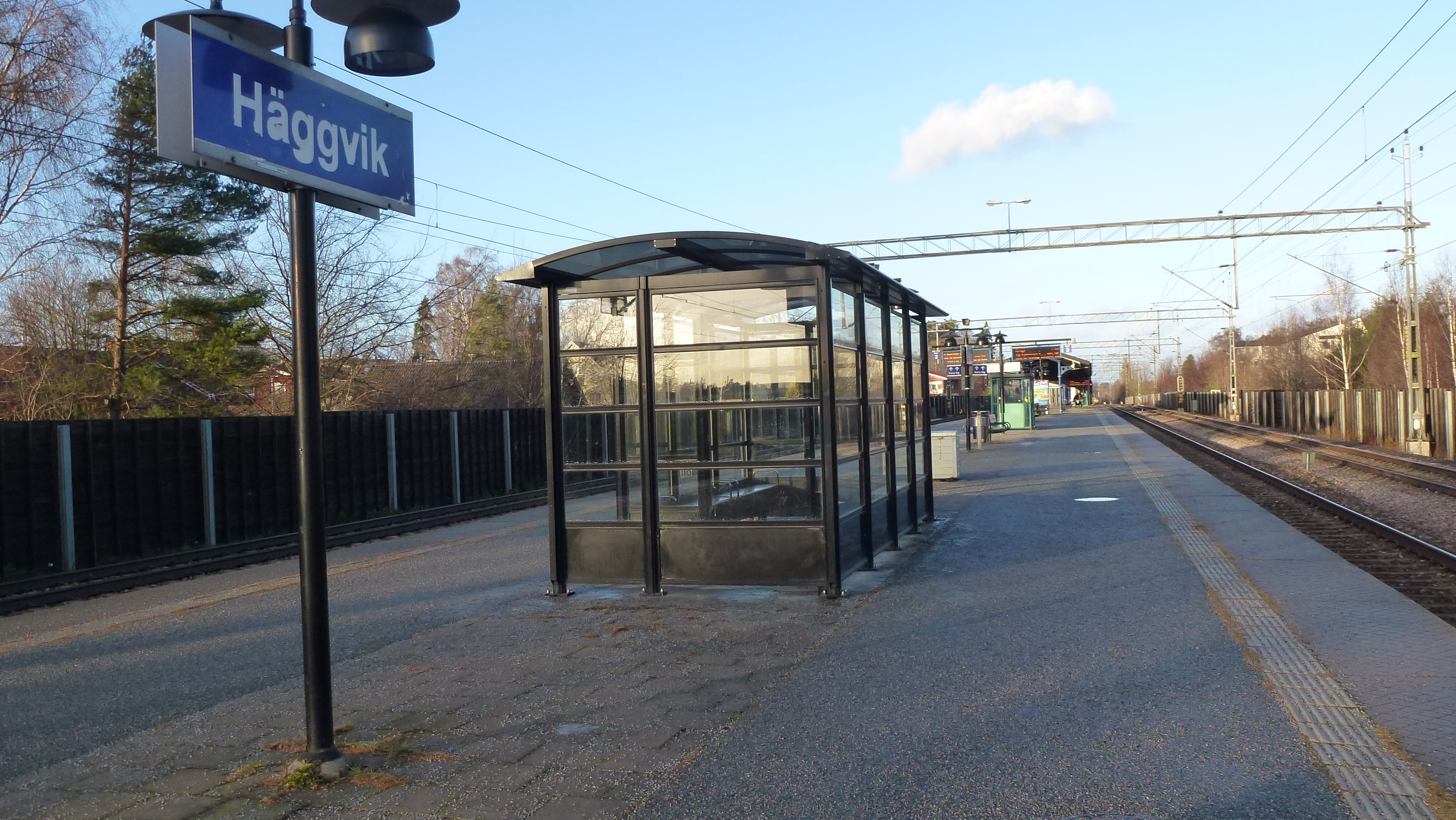

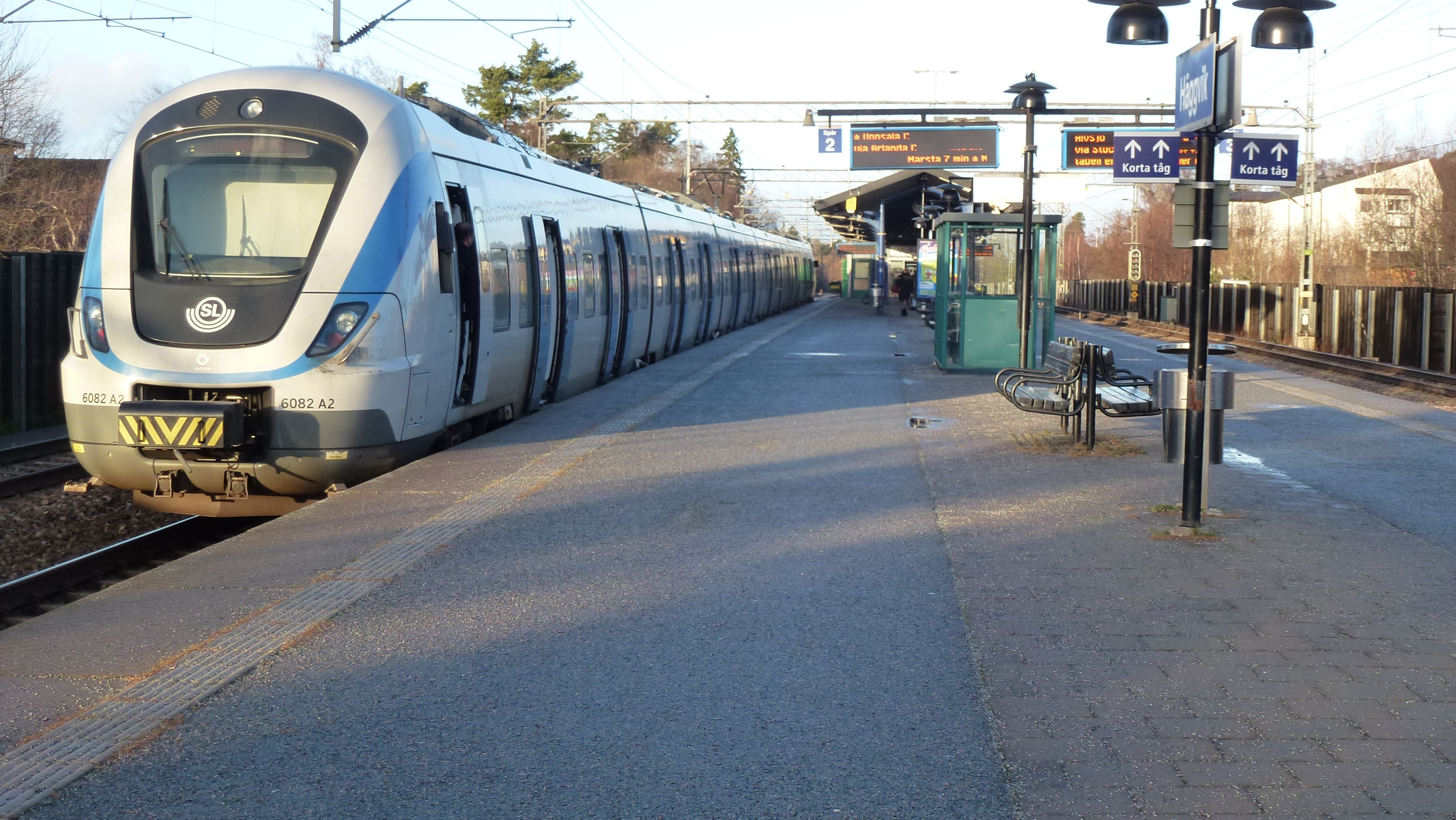

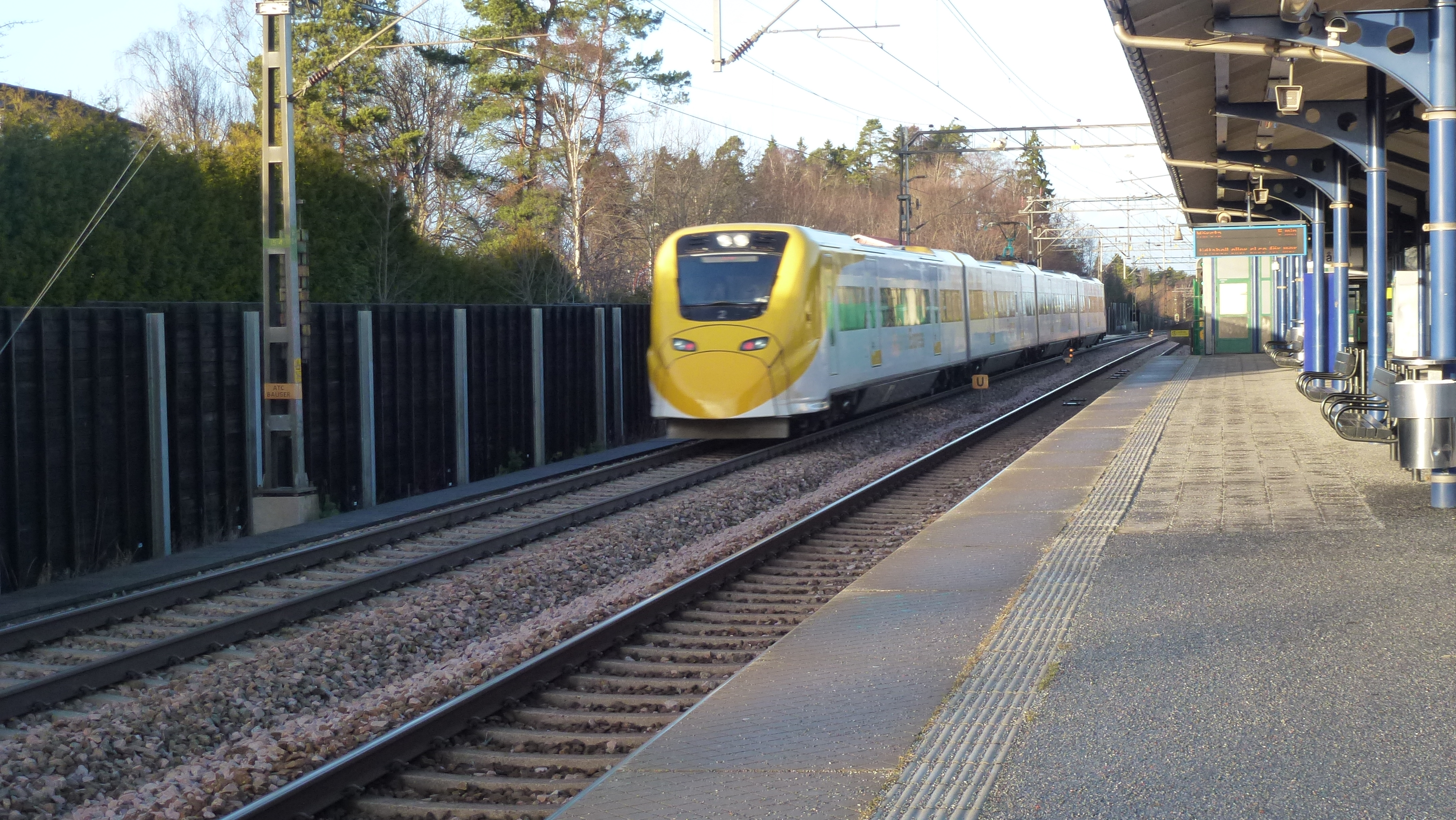

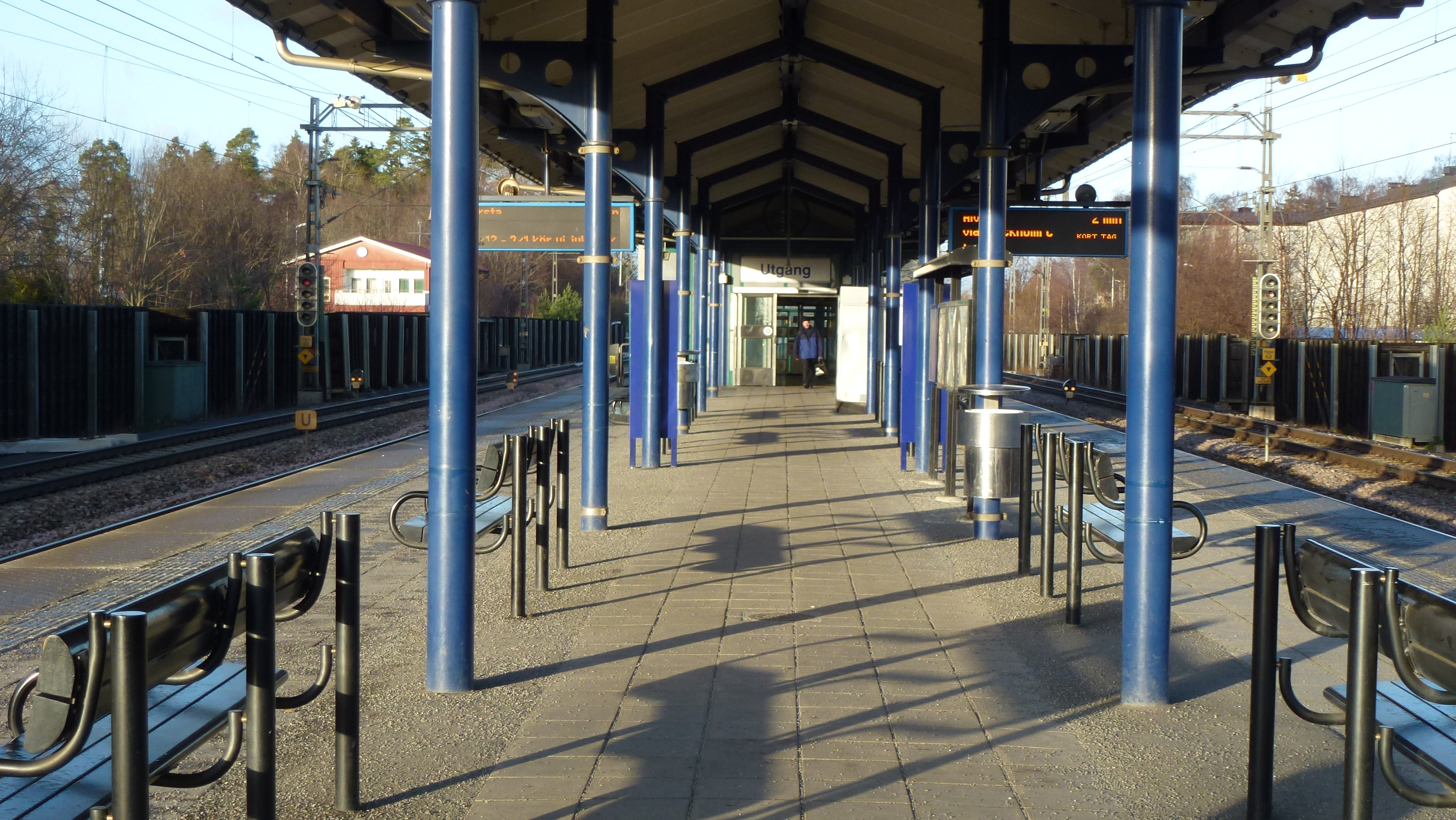

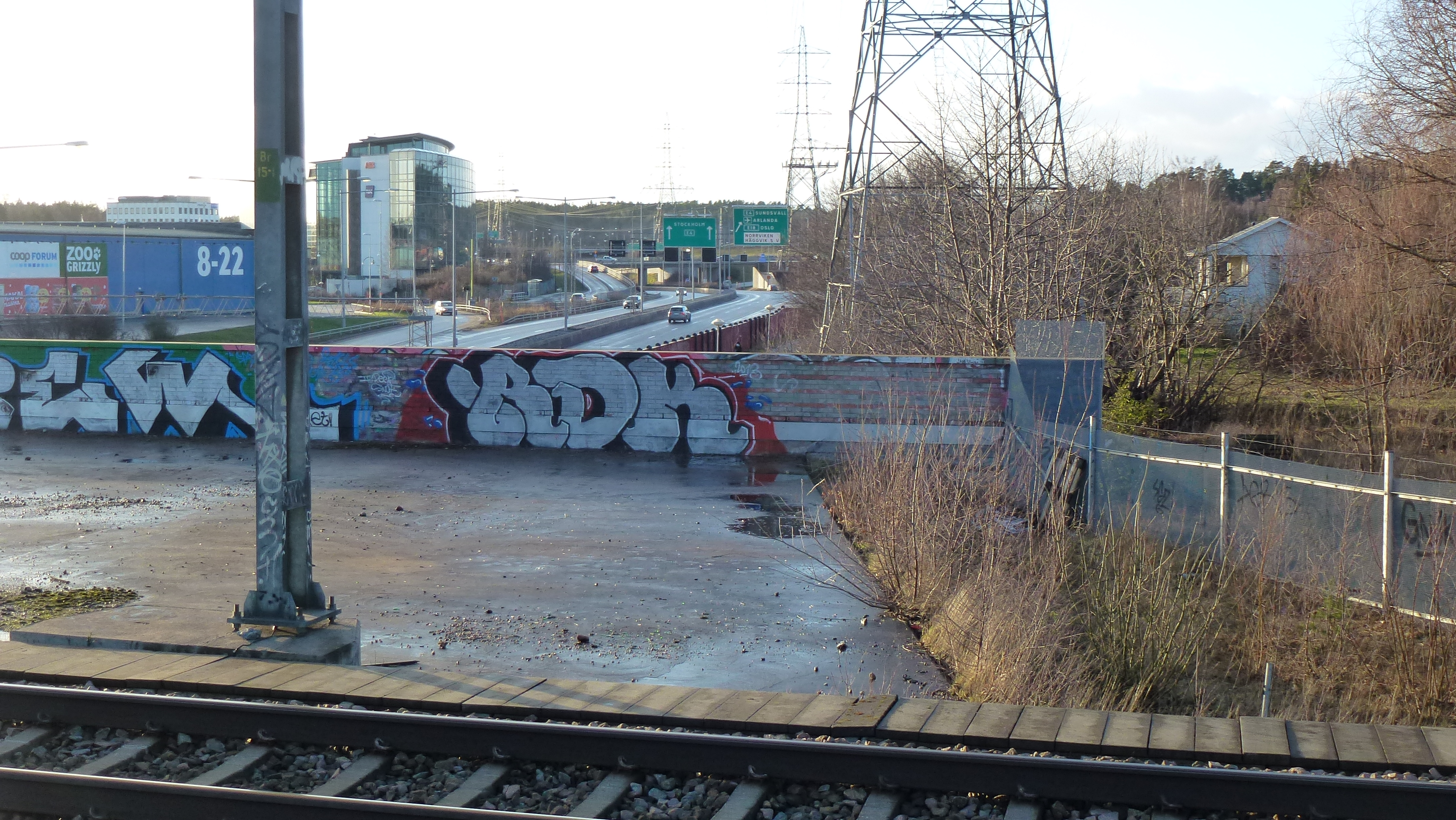
