= Kårböle stave church =

Coordinates: 61°58′49.8″N 15°18′5.8″E

- Kårböle stavkyrka
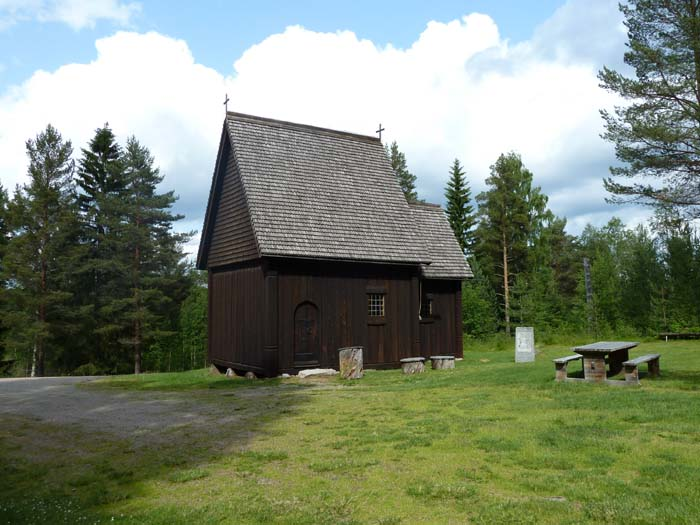
- Kårböle stave church in July 2015
- Kårböle stave church
- Location: Kårböle
- Country: Sweden
- Denomination: Church of Sweden

History
- Consecrated: 1989

Administration
- Diocese: Uppsala
- Parish: Färila-Kårböle

Kårböle stave church (St Olav's sacrifice church) is a reconstructed stave church in Kårböle, Ljusdal municipality, Gävleborg County, Sweden.

The church is from 1989. It's built at a site where pilgrims stopped to perform ritual sacrifice on their long walk to Nidarosdomen in Norway, during pilgrimage in the 12th century.
