= Häggviks stave church =

Stave church replica in Häggvik, Sweden

Häggviks stave church is a replica of a stave church in Häggvik, Nordingrå court district, Norrland province of Sweden.

This replica of a stave church is situated at Anders Åberg's museum Mannaminne at Höga kusten. It was built in 2000.
