= Östertälje railway station =

Railway station in Södertälje, Sweden

Östertälje
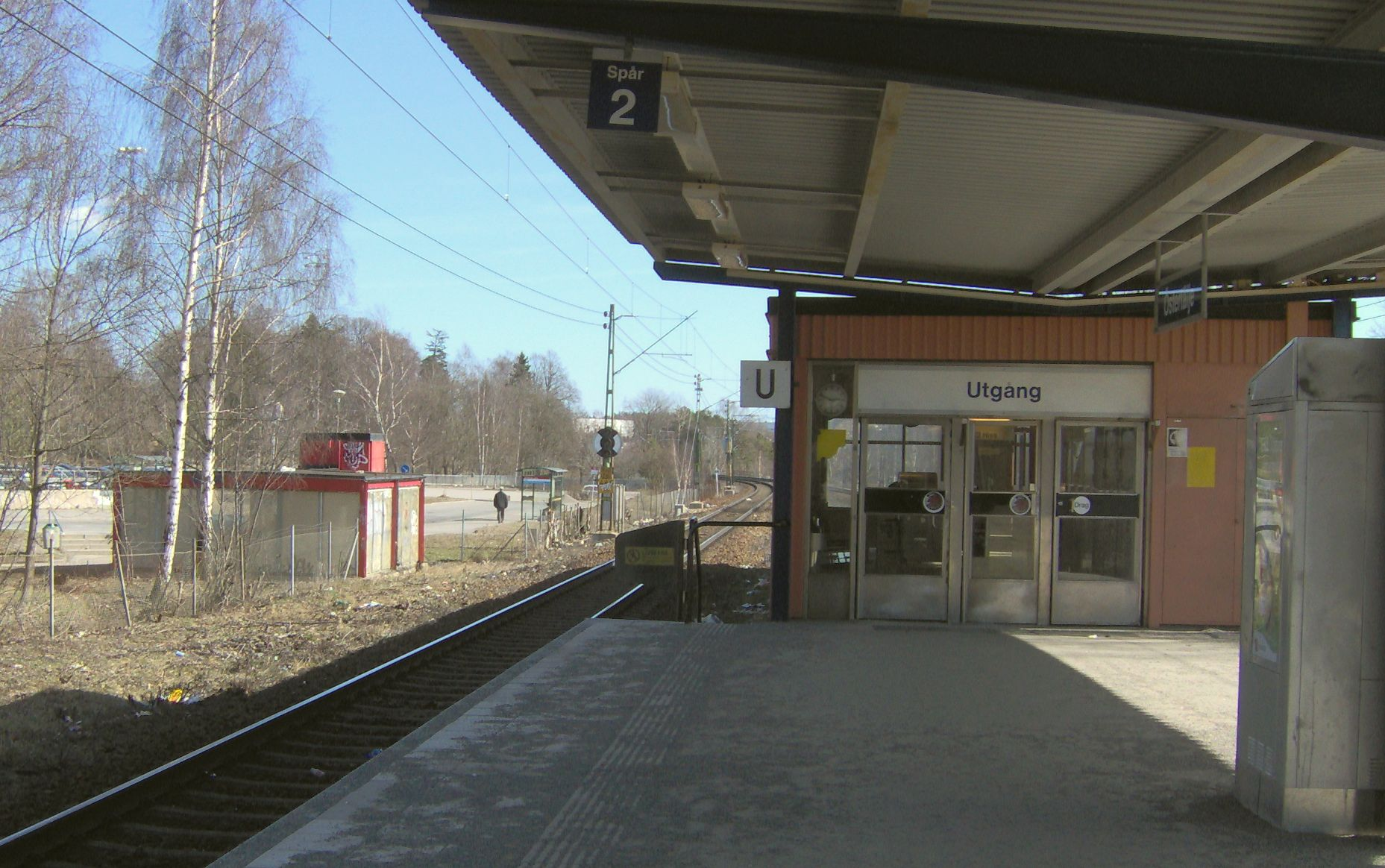
- Östertälje station

General information
- Location: Östertälje, Södertälje Municipality, Stockholm County; Sweden
- Coordinates: 59°11′07″N 17°39′29″E
- System: Pendeltåg
- Owner: Swedish Transport Administration
- Platforms: Island Platform
- Tracks: 2
- Connections: Bus terminal

Construction
- Structure type: At-grade
- Accessible: Yes

Other information
- Station code: Öte

History
- Opened: 1921 (current station 1970)

Passengers
- 3,000 per weekday (2015) (commuter rail)

Services
Preceding station	Stockholm commuter rail	Following station
Rönninge towards Uppsala C	40	Södertälje hamn towards Södertälje centrum
Rönninge towards Märsta	41	Södertälje hamn towards Södertälje centrum
Location

Östertälje is a station on Stockholm's commuter rail network, located in the district of Östertälje in south-eastern Södertälje, 34.3 km from Stockholm City railway station. The station consists of a single island platform with a ticket hall on the platform, accessible via a pedestrian tunnel. As of 2015, it had an average of 3,000 boardings per winter weekday. Travel time to Stockholm City is 34 minutes, and to Södertälje centrum, 9 minutes.

== History ==
A stop at Igelsta was established in 1879, later replaced by Östertälje station in 1921 due to a track realignment. After SL took over responsibility for local rail traffic in the Stockholm region, the current standardised station structure was completed in 1970, replacing the old station building and pedestrian bridge.

The station has elevators, but no escalators. On the eastern side, there is a small kiosk, as well as stops for connecting bus services. Ticket sales are available near the fare gates at the entrance. From Östertälje, city buses operate to other locations in Södertälje and to Nynäshamn.

Between June 2011 and December 2012, the station experienced a significant increase in ridership due to the closure of Södertälje centrum railway station for railway reconstruction. During this period, many city bus routes were temporarily rerouted to Östertälje. Normally, Södertälje C has around 6,800 boardings per weekday, and the majority of those passengers used Östertälje instead during the closure.

== Gallery ==
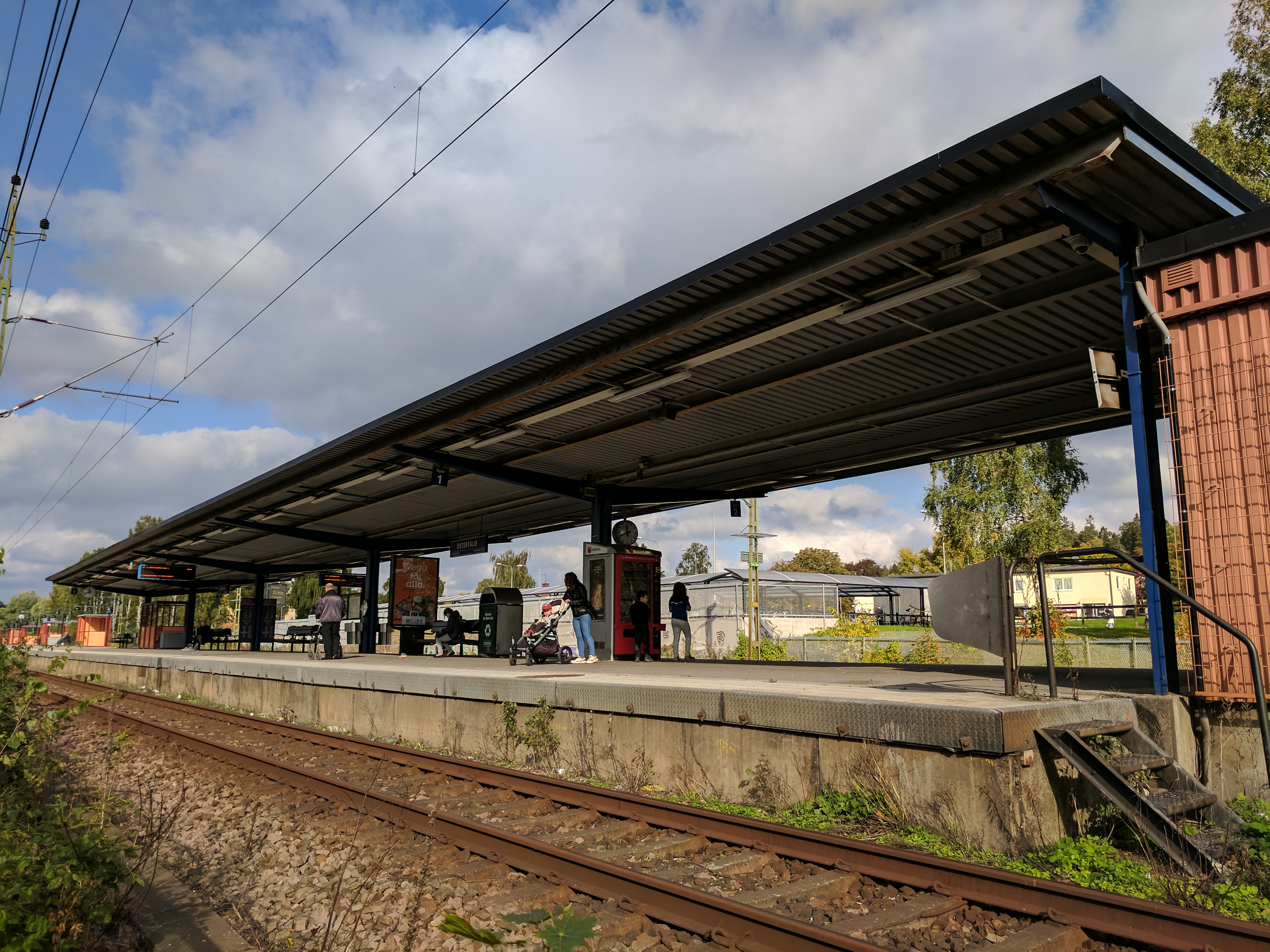
Station

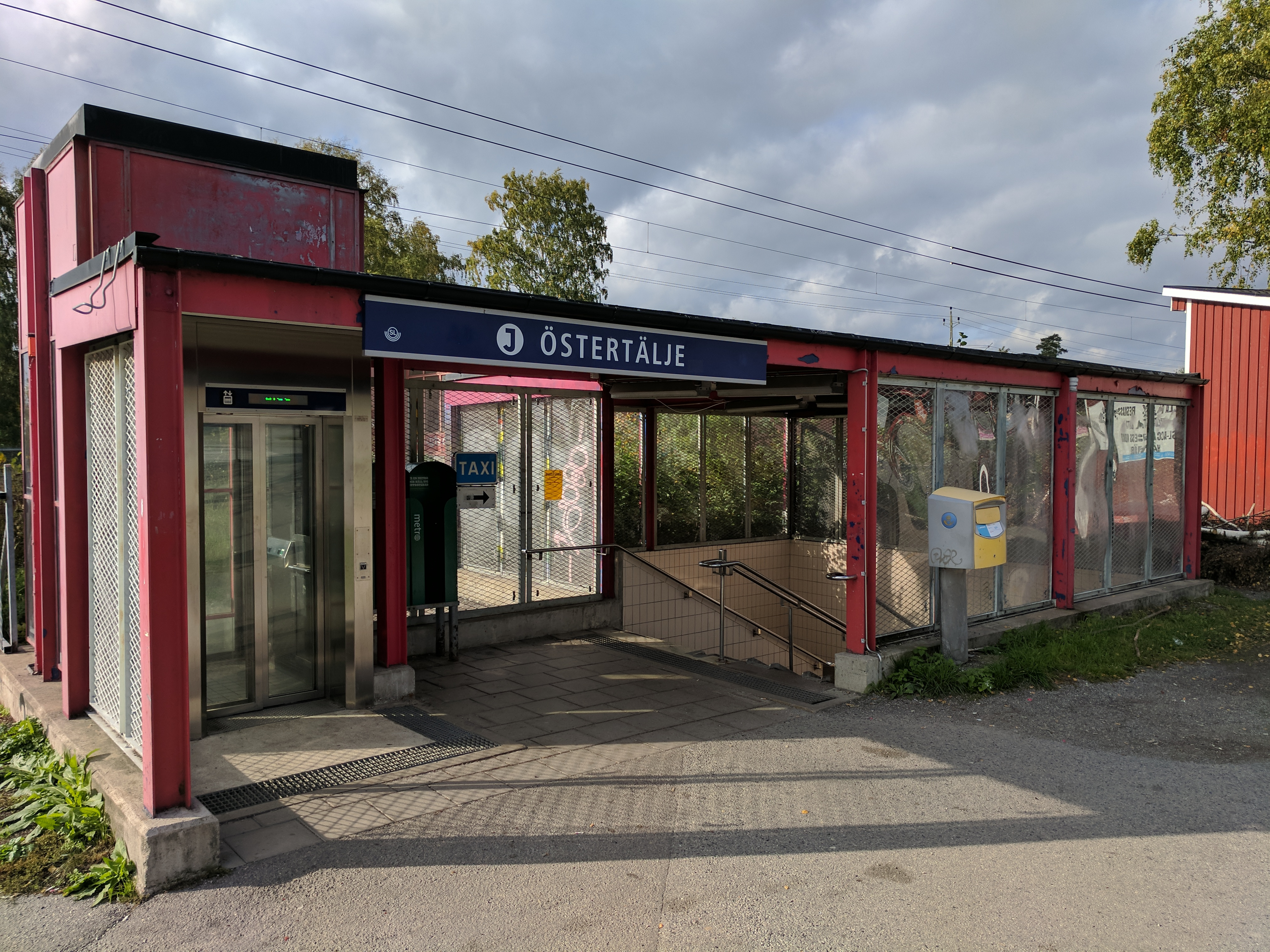
Entrance

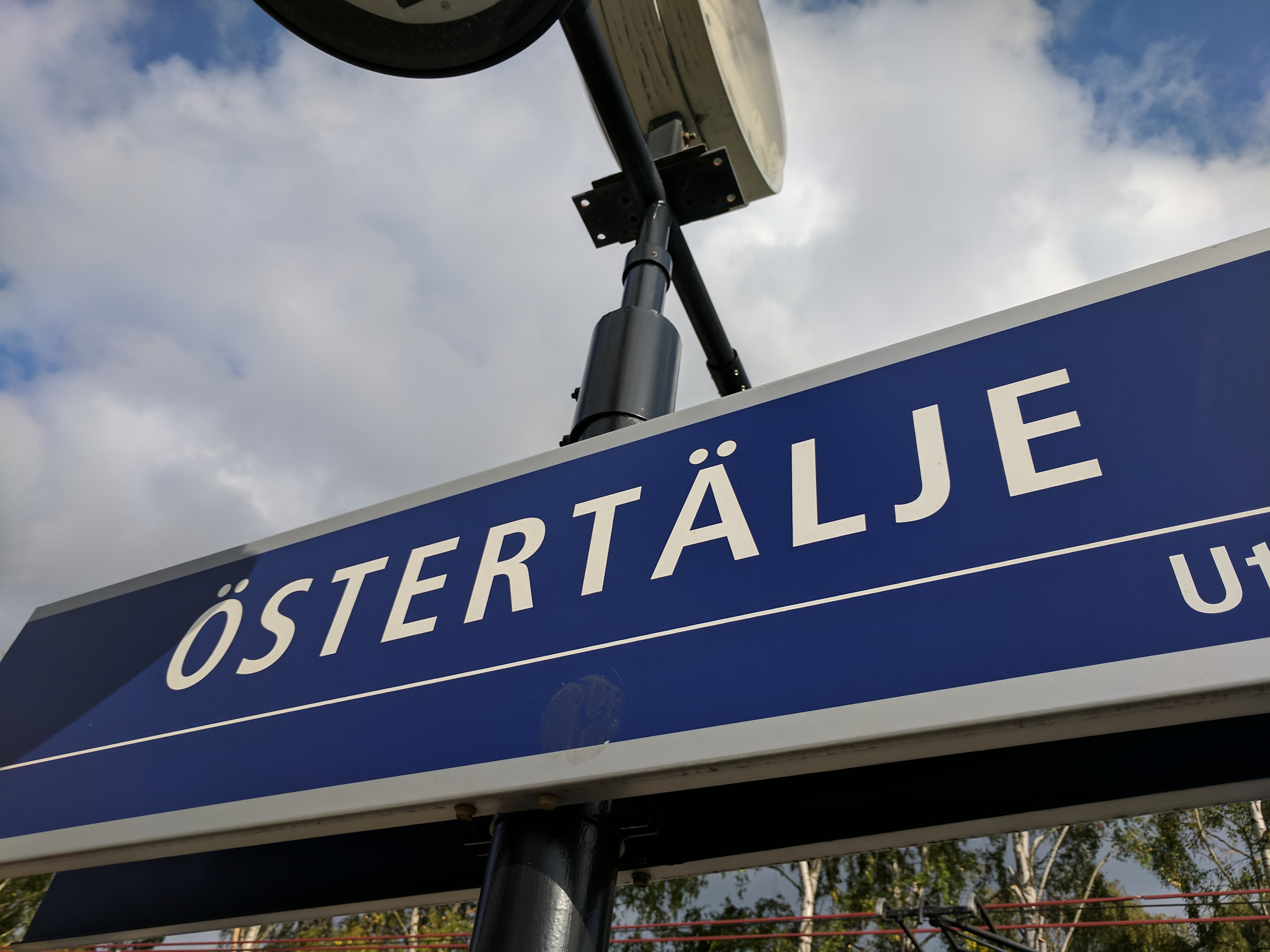
Station sign

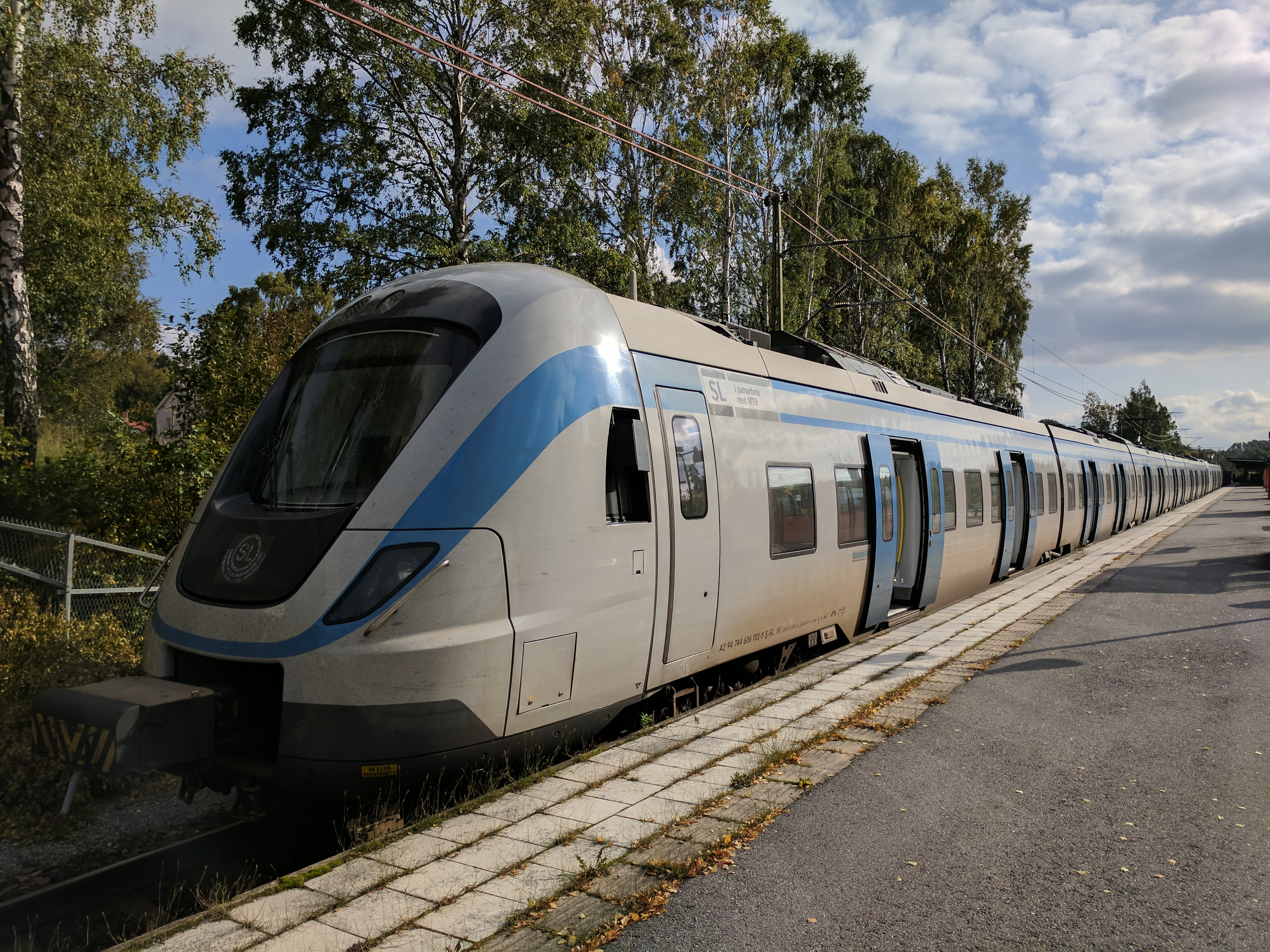
X60 commuter train at the station
