= Rönninge railway station =

Railway station in Salem, Sweden

Rönninge
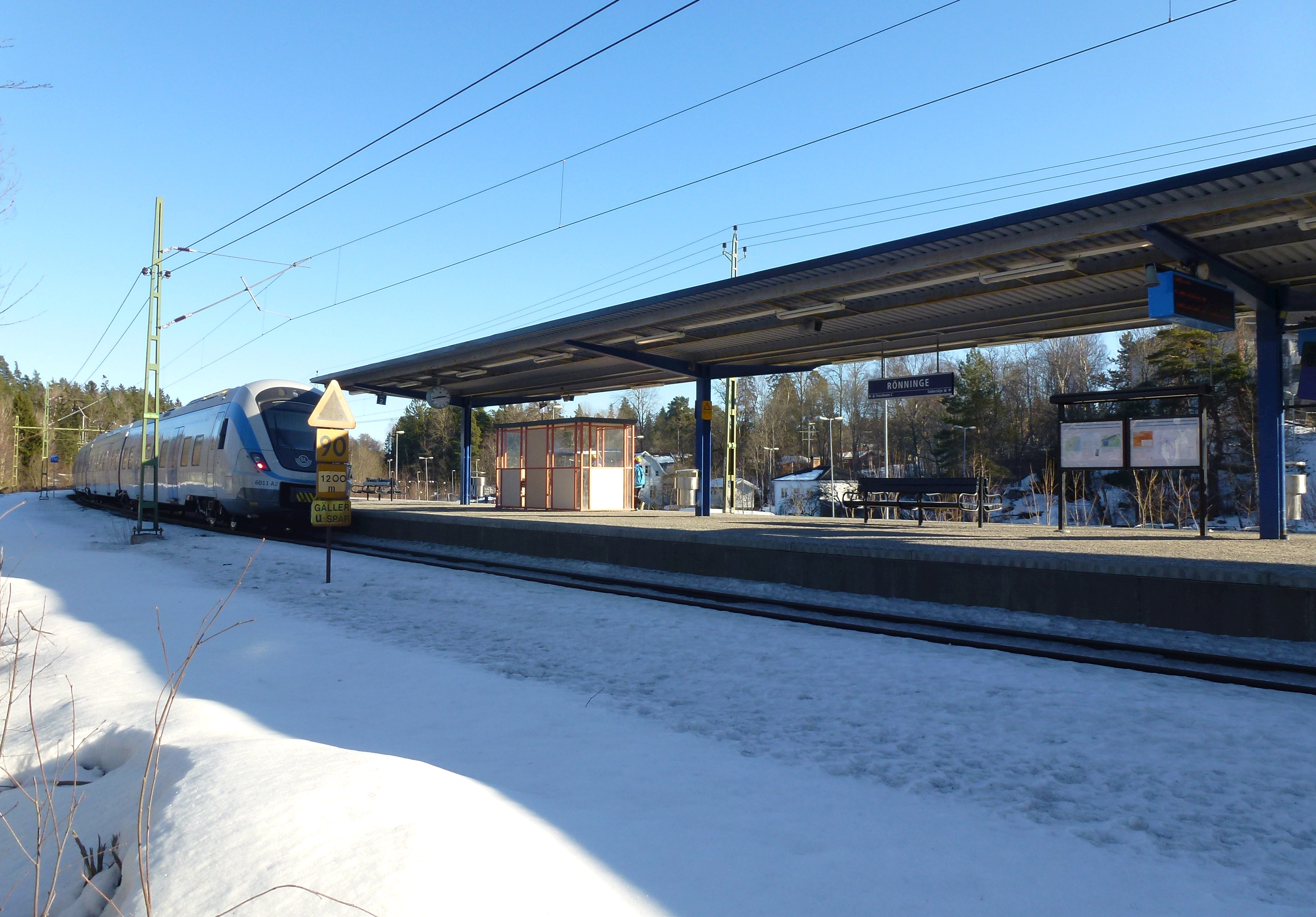
- Rönninge station, 2013

General information
- Location: Rönninge, Salem Municipality, Sweden; Stockholm County
- Coordinates: 59°11′30″N 17°45′18″E
- System: Pendeltåg
- Owner: Swedish Transport Administration
- Platforms: Island Platform
- Tracks: 2
- Connections: Bus terminal

Construction
- Structure type: At-grade
- Accessible: Yes

Other information
- Station code: Rön

History
- Opened: 1888 (current station 1970)

Passengers
- 2,600 per weekday (2015) (commuter rail)

Services
Preceding station	Stockholm commuter rail	Following station
Tumba towards Uppsala C	40	Östertälje towards Södertälje Centrum
Tumba towards Märsta	41	Östertälje towards Södertälje Centrum
Location

Rönninge is a station on Stockholm's commuter rail network, located in Rönninge in Salem Municipality, 28.4 km from Stockholm City railway station. The station has a single island platform with a ticket hall on the platform, accessible via a pedestrian tunnel. In 2015, the station had an average of 2,600 boardings per winter weekday.

== History ==
The station was originally opened in 1888. It underwent renovations in 1915-16 and 1920, when the first pedestrian tunnel was added. In 1970, after Storstockholms Lokaltrafik (SL) took over operations, further adaptations were made for commuter rail service: the platform was elevated, a new pedestrian tunnel was built, and the original station building was demolished. In the late 1980s, additional modernisation efforts included the installation of elevators.

=== Development timeline ===
- 1903: Double-track railway extended from Huddinge to Rönninge.
- 1908: Double-track extended from Rönninge to Södertälje.
- 1926: Electrification completed.
- 1967: Storstockholms Lokaltrafik (SL) takes over commuter train services.
- 1970: Major station rebuild; old station building demolished.
- 1980s: Station modernised with accessibility improvements, including elevators.

== Gallery ==
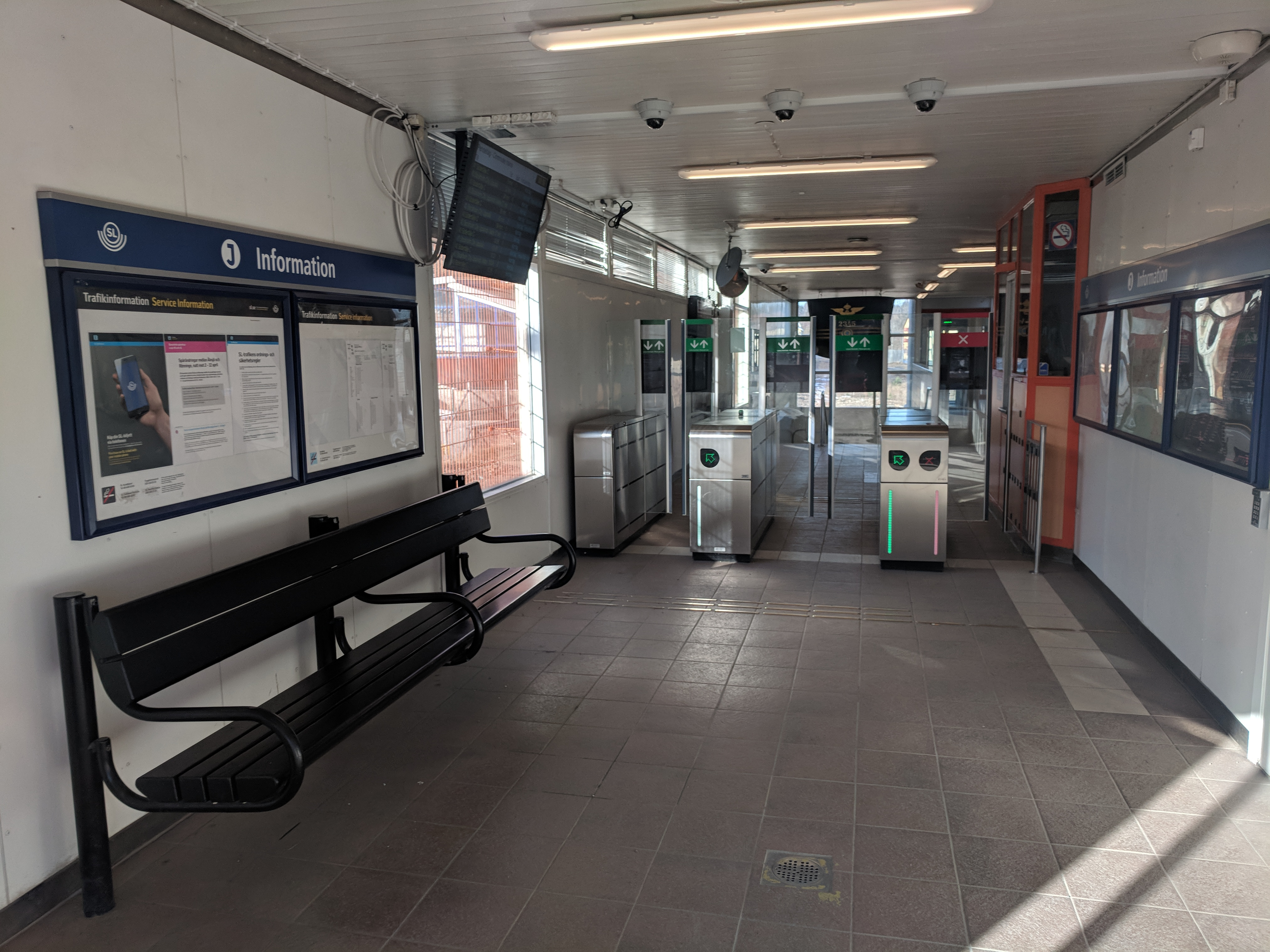
Ticket hall

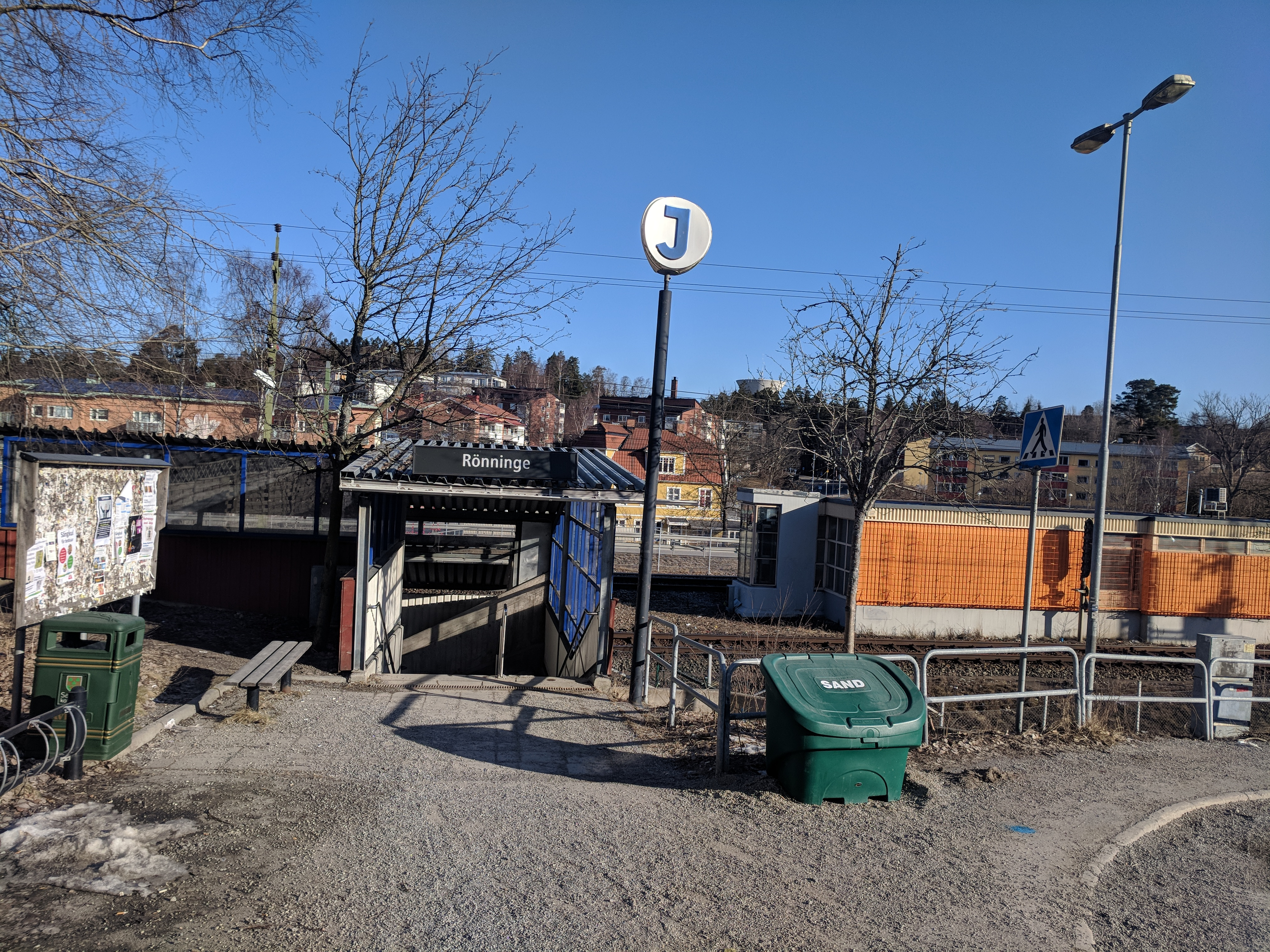
Entrance

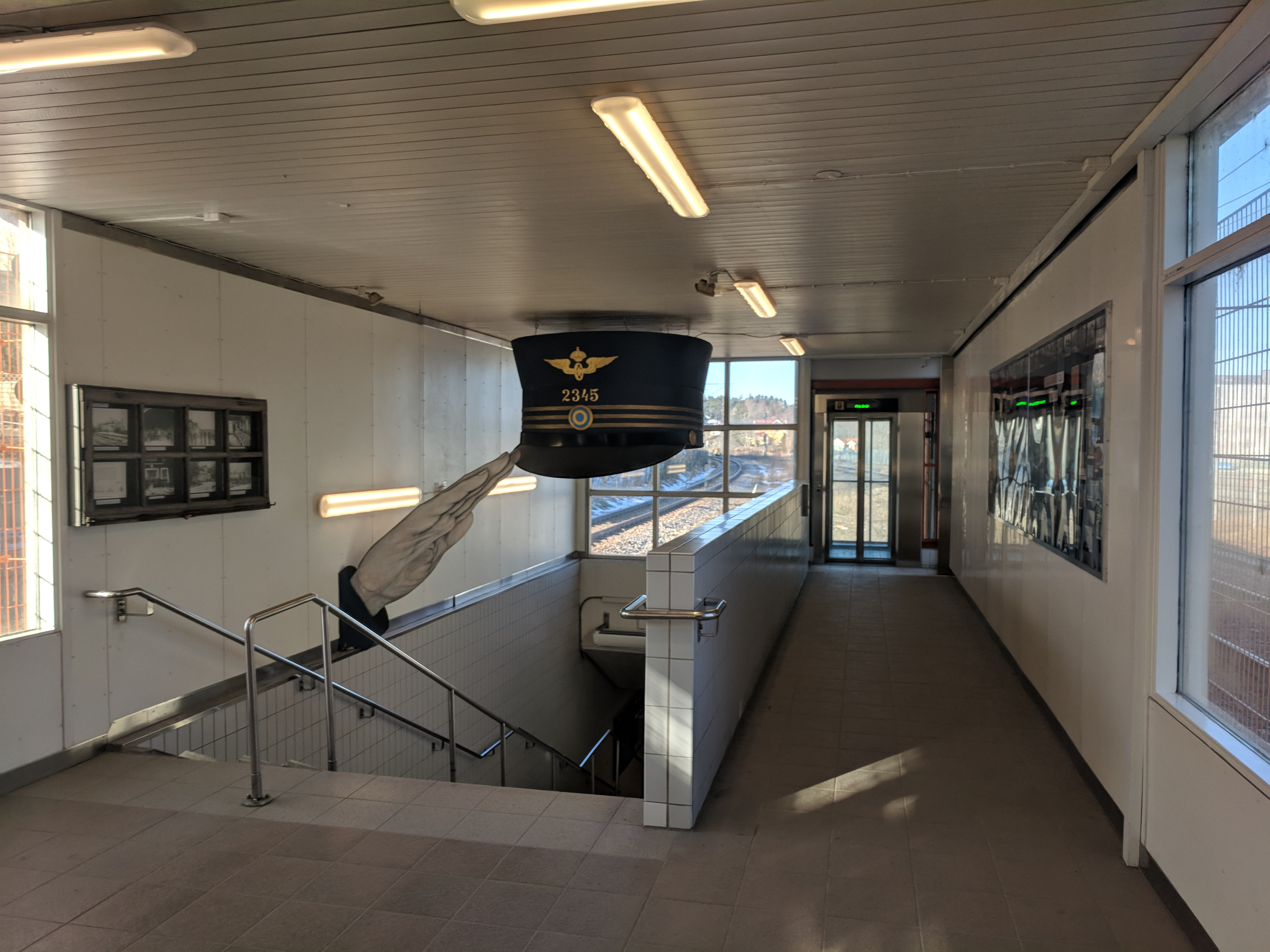
Staircase with artistic decoration

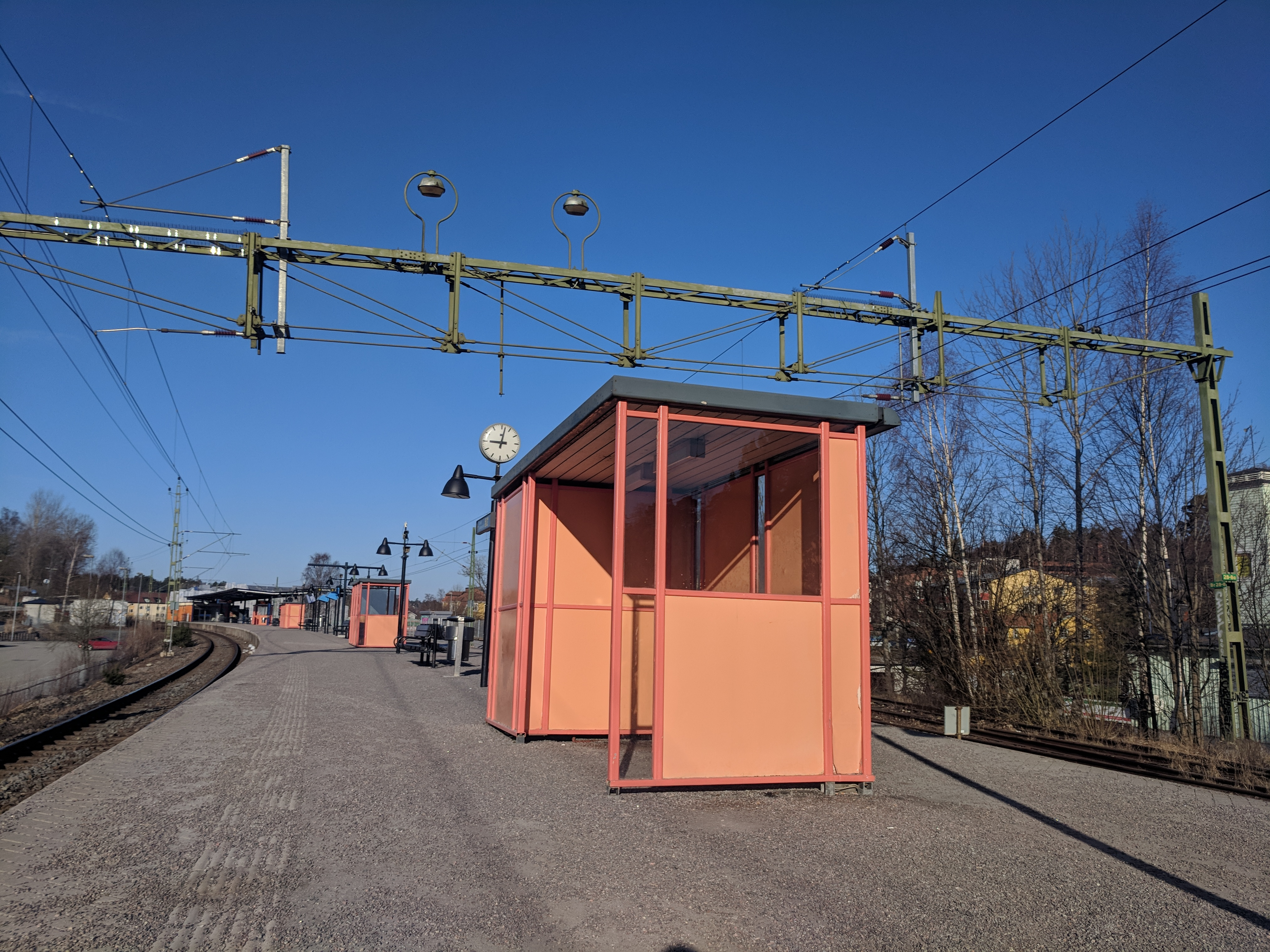
Platform

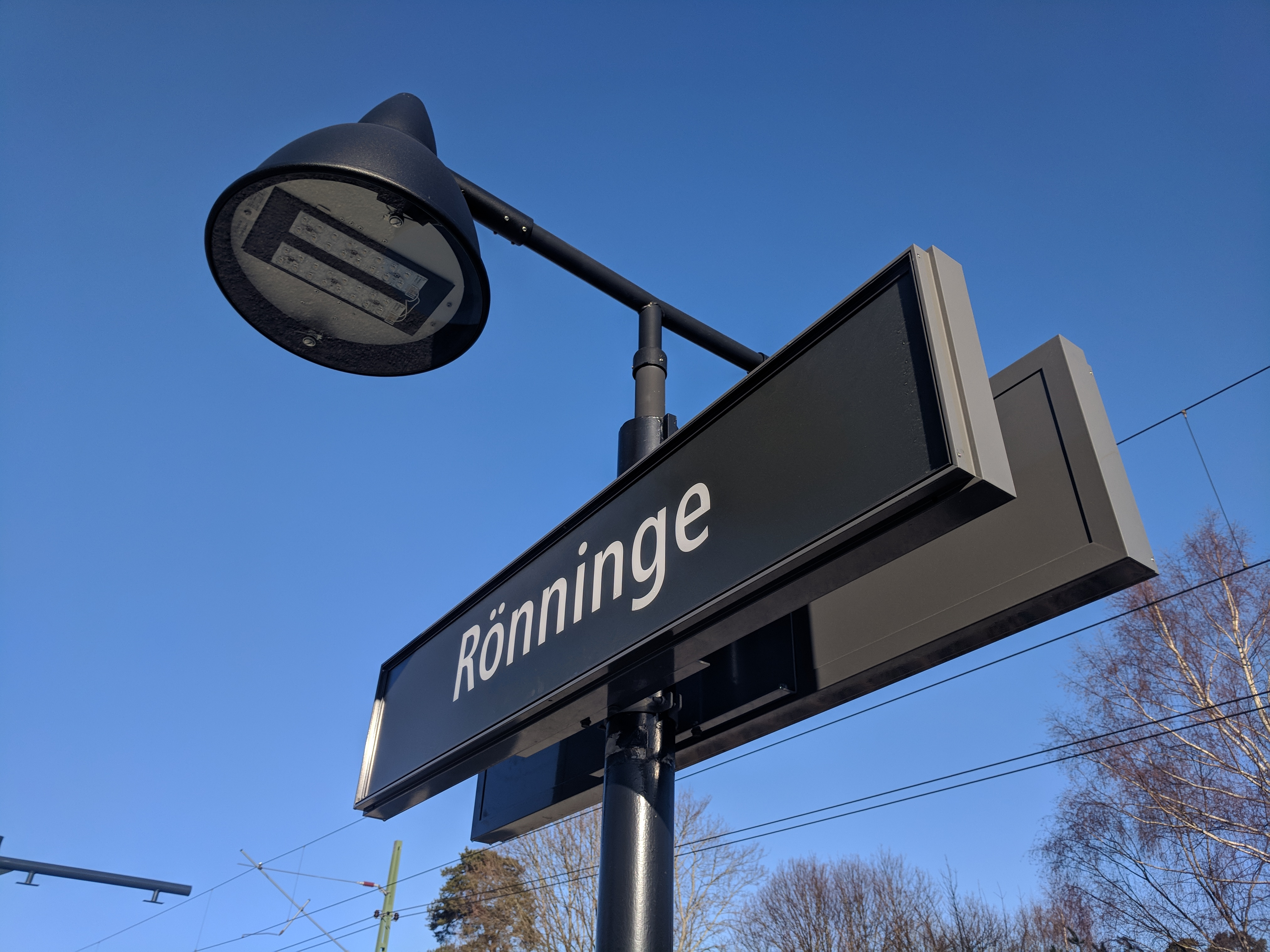
Station sign

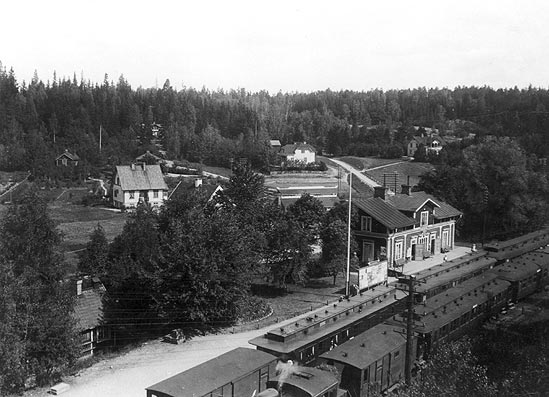
Rönninge station in 1908
