= Södertälje hamn railway station =

Railway station in Södertälje, Sweden

Södertälje hamn
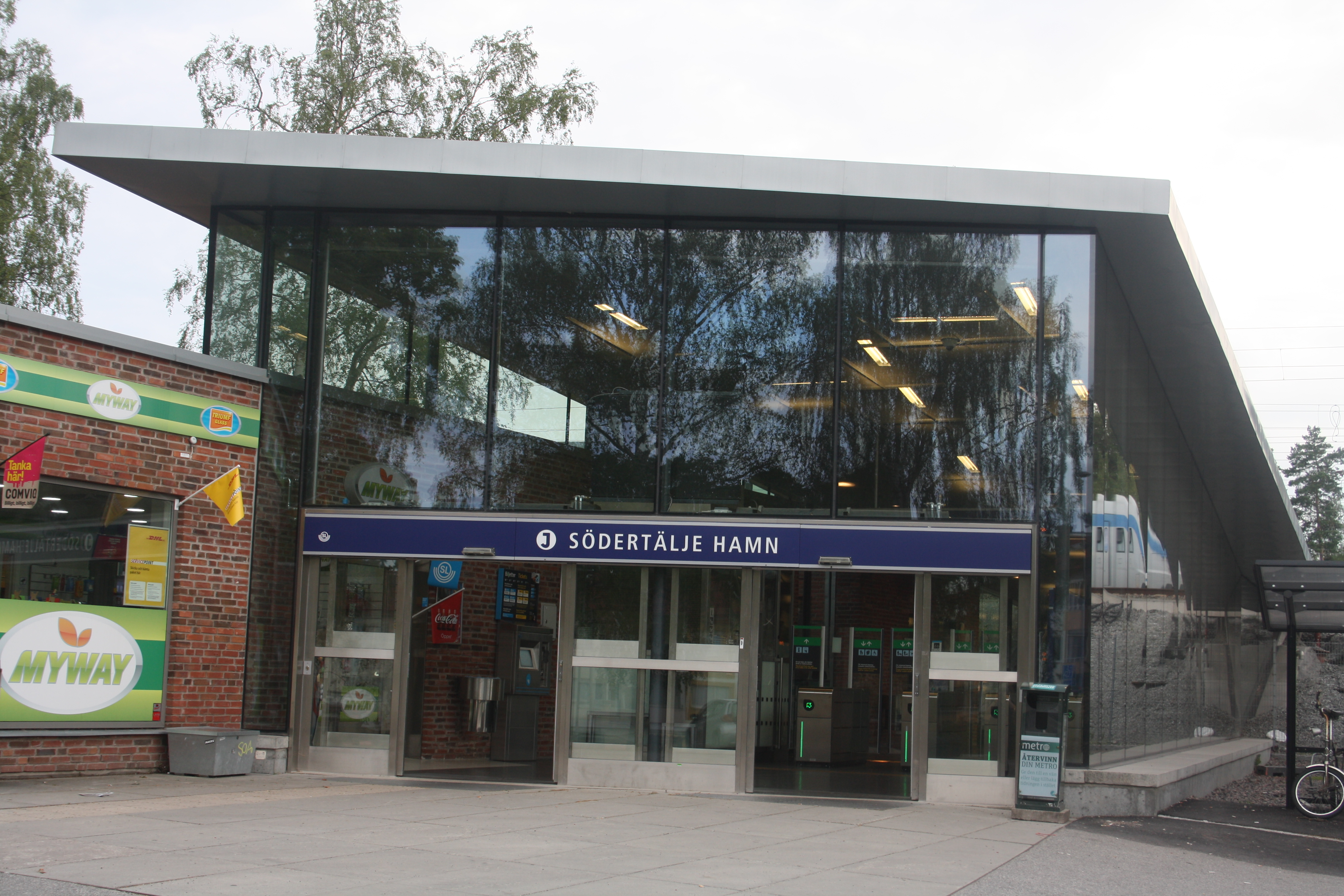
- Entrance to station

General information
- Location: Södertälje, Södertälje Municipality; Sweden
- Coordinates: 59°10′45″N 17°38′50″E
- Line: Western Main Line (Västra stambanan)

History
- Opened: 1921

Passengers
- 2019: 4,600 boarding per weekday

Services
Preceding station	Stockholm commuter rail	Following station
Östertälje towards Uppsala C	40	Södertälje centrum Terminus
Östertälje towards Märsta	41	Södertälje centrum Terminus
Södertälje syd towards Gnesta	48	Södertälje centrum Terminus
Location

Södertälje hamn ("Södertälje harbour") (previously Södertälje södra ("Södertälje south") until 1994) is a railway station along Sweden's Western Main Line (Västra stambanan) in Södertälje.

Before Grödingebanan was constructed in the 1990s, Södertälje hamn was the main train station in Södertälje for national and regional trains. Today it is only used by Stockholm commuter rail.

== Passenger traffic ==
All commuter trains between Stockholm and Södertälje centrum need to charge direction in Södertälje hamn, due to the track layout. To avoid wasting the time needed for the drivers to walk between the driver seats of the 214 metres (702 ft) long trains, extra drivers are used between Södertälje hamn and Södertälje centrum.

There are three commuter rail lines through Södertälje hamn. J40 and J41 go from Södertälje centrum via Stockholm City railway station to Uppsala and Märsta respectively. J48 goes from Södertälje centrum to Gnesta.

The station is within walking distance to the Port of Södertälje vicinity as well as the headquarters and main factory of Scania AB.
