= Södertälje centrum railway station =

Railway station in Södertälje, Sweden

Södertälje C
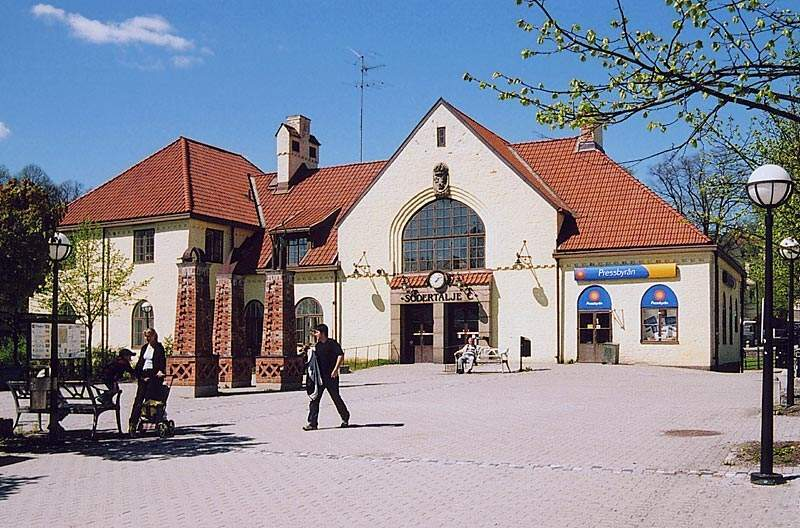

General information
- Location: Södertälje, Södertälje Municipality; Sweden
- Coordinates: 59°11′30″N 17°37′40″E
- Line: Västra stambanan
- Distance: 38.1 km

History
- Opened: 1860
- Former names: Södertelge nedre (1860-1926); Södertälje Central Station (1926-1994)

Passengers
- 2019: 8,500 boarding per weekday

Services
Preceding station	Stockholm commuter rail	Following station
Södertälje hamn towards Uppsala C	40	Terminus
Södertälje hamn towards Märsta	41	Terminus
Södertälje hamn towards Bro	44	Terminus
Södertälje hamn towards Gnesta	48	Terminus
Location
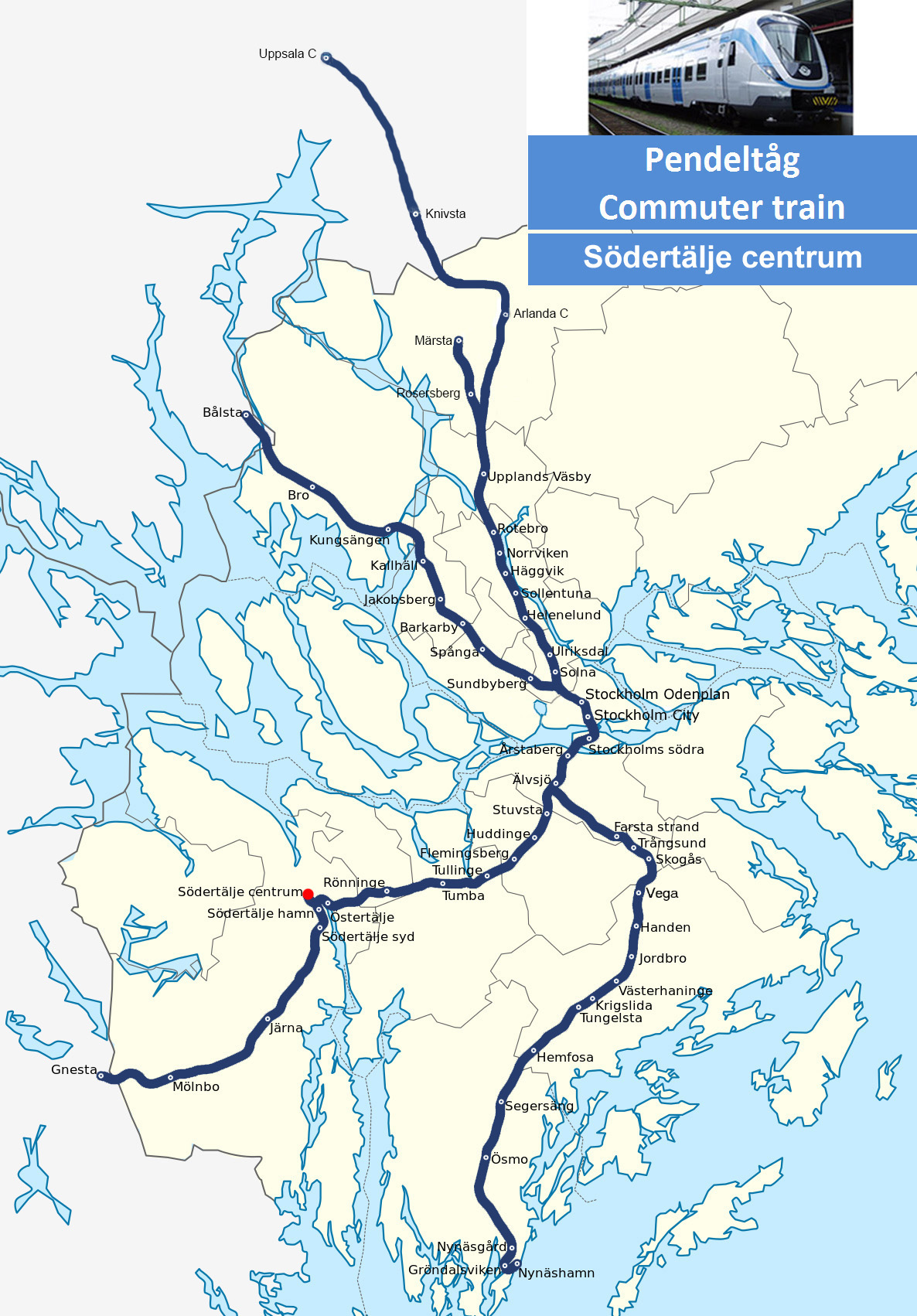

Södertälje centrum (abbreviated Södertälje C) is a station on Stockholm's commuter train network, located in central Södertälje in Stockholm County, Sweden. The station is 38.1 km from Stockholm C, and is the terminus station of a branch line from Södertälje hamn railway station. Södertälje centrum serves SL train routes 40, 41 and 44 towards Stockholm. Line 48 to Gnesta also starts from here, which is the only of Stockholm's commuter train lines not running via Stockholm City.

== History ==
The station opened to traffic in 1860 as part of Stockholm's first railway line under the name Södertelge nedre (Södertelge Lower), however on 15 May 1926, the station was renamed Södertälje Central Station, despite only being used for local services, and was finally changed to Södertälje centrum in 1994. Trains from Södertälje centrum previously operated on a shuttle service to Södertälje hamn, however since 1982 services have been continuous to Stockholm.

== Architecture ==
The station is notable for being one of the few Swedish railway stations with two older station buildings intact. The older 1860 building was built with red brick facades, and with rustic corner quoins. This building was designed in by architect Adolf Wilhelm Edelsvärd, who was responsible for many of SJ's station buildings during the second half of the 19th century. The station building was inaugurated by King Charles XV in during a test ride on the new railway in 1860.

The second station building was built in 1917 according to drawings by Swedish State Railways chief architect Folke Zettervall and was placed a little further north perpendicular to the first. The building was a designed in a national romantic style, with facades plastered in a discoloured yellow.

Both buildings are red-classified by Stockholm County Museum, meaning that the building meet the requirements for a building monument declaration.

Neither of the old station buildings is used today directly by the railway. The 1860 building is now owned by Södertälje Municipality, and houses restaurants. The 1917 building is owned by state-owned railway real-estate company Jernhusen, and houses a kiosk and a café.

As of 2021, there are plans for a new station pavilion to be built.

== Gallery ==
=== Historic Photos ===
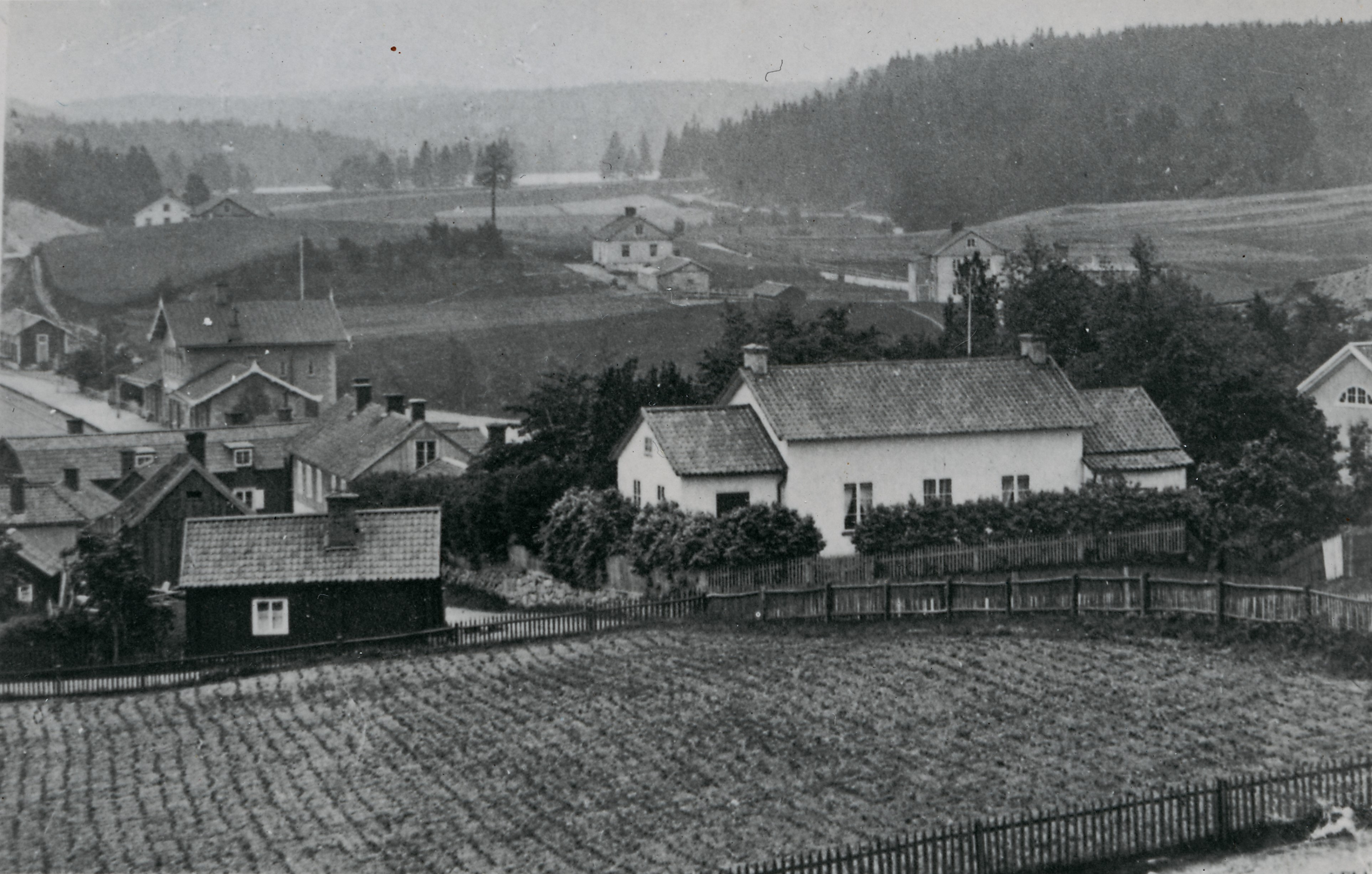
Station, 1860

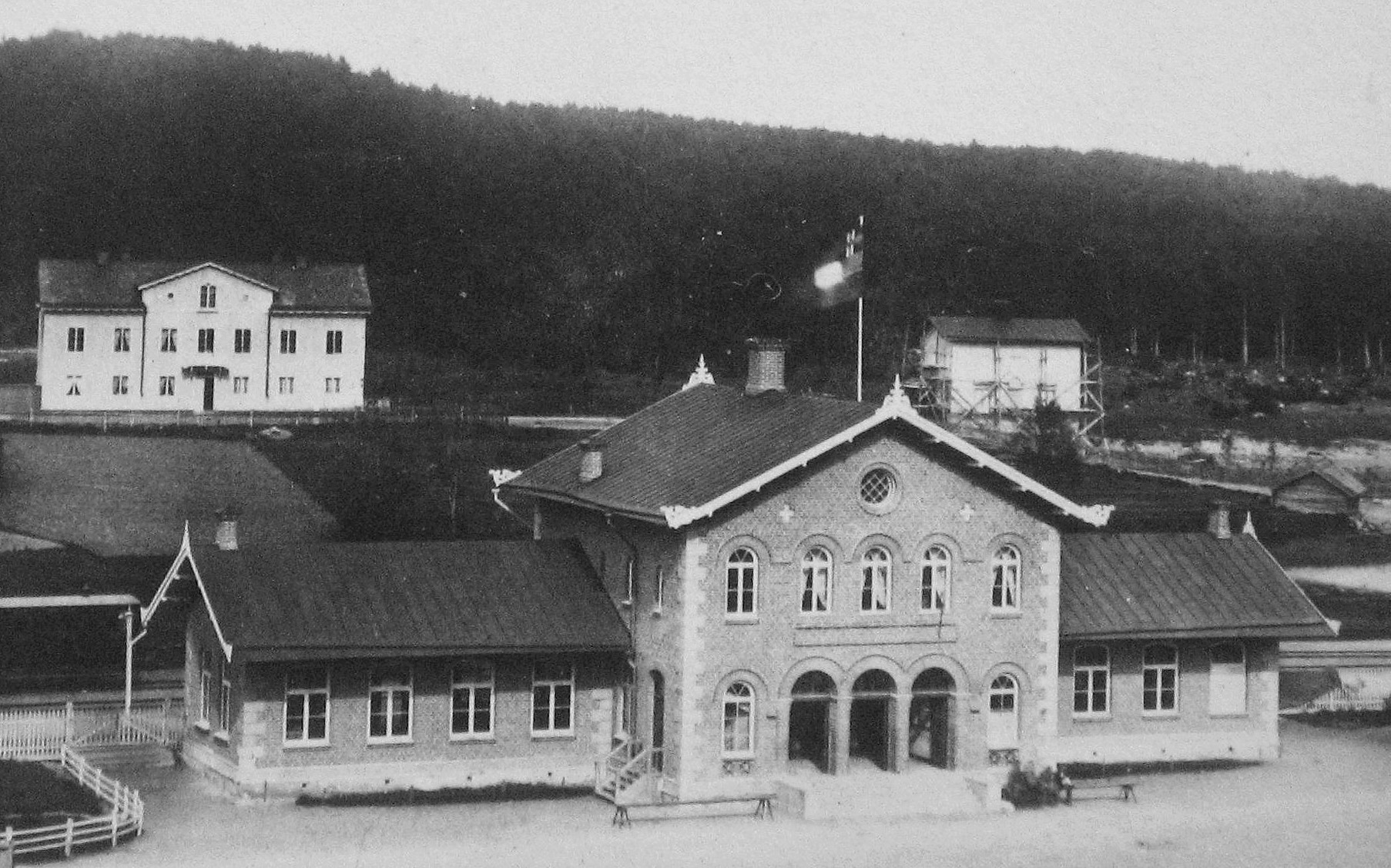
Original Building, 1860

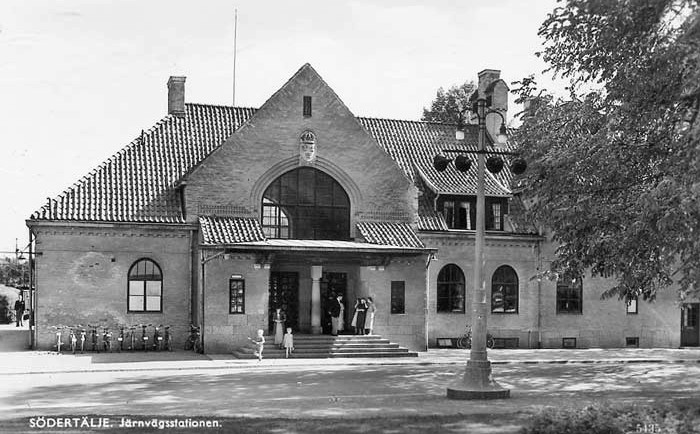
Second Station Building, 1922

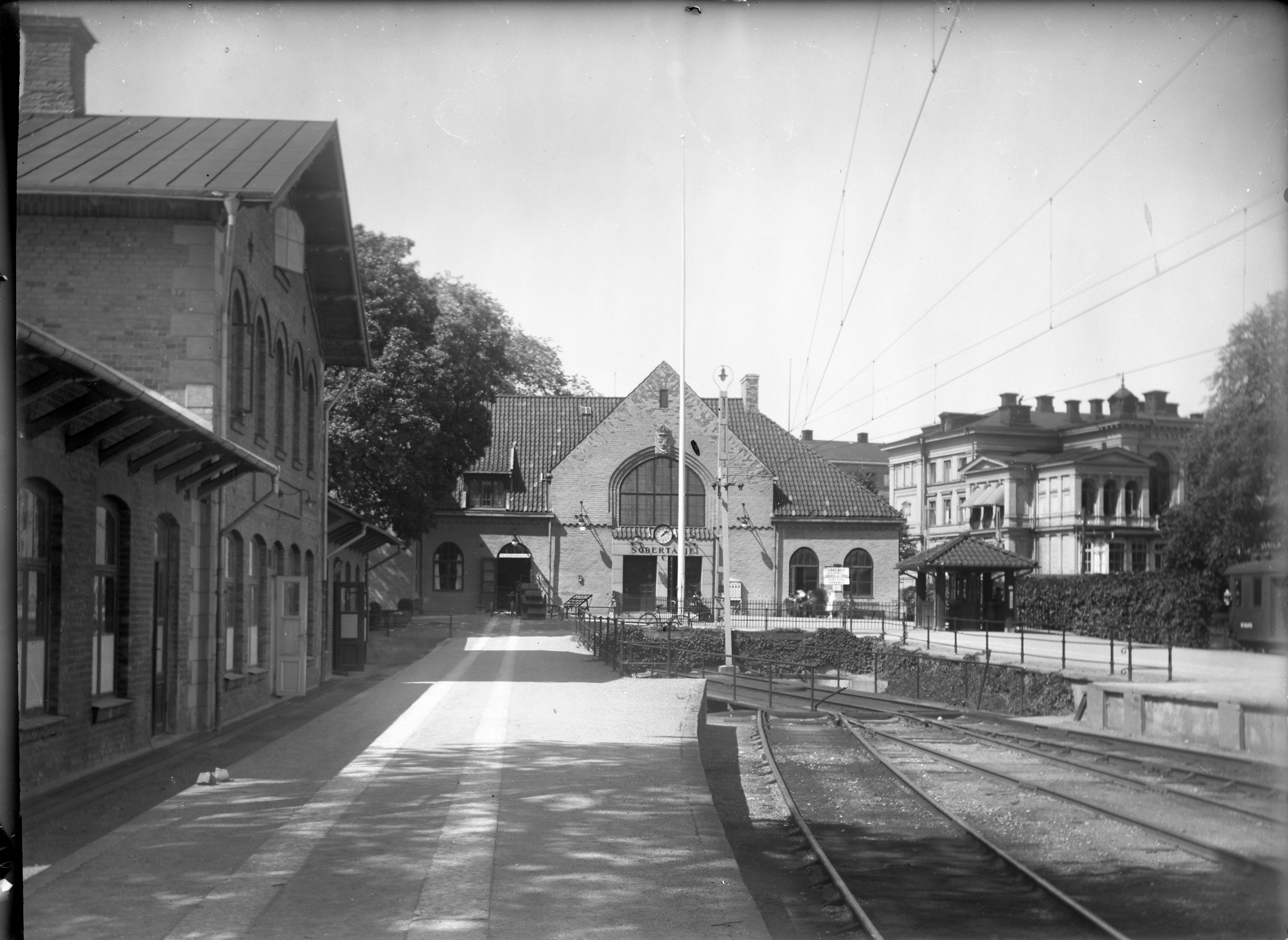
Tracks and Platforms, 1938

=== The Station Today ===
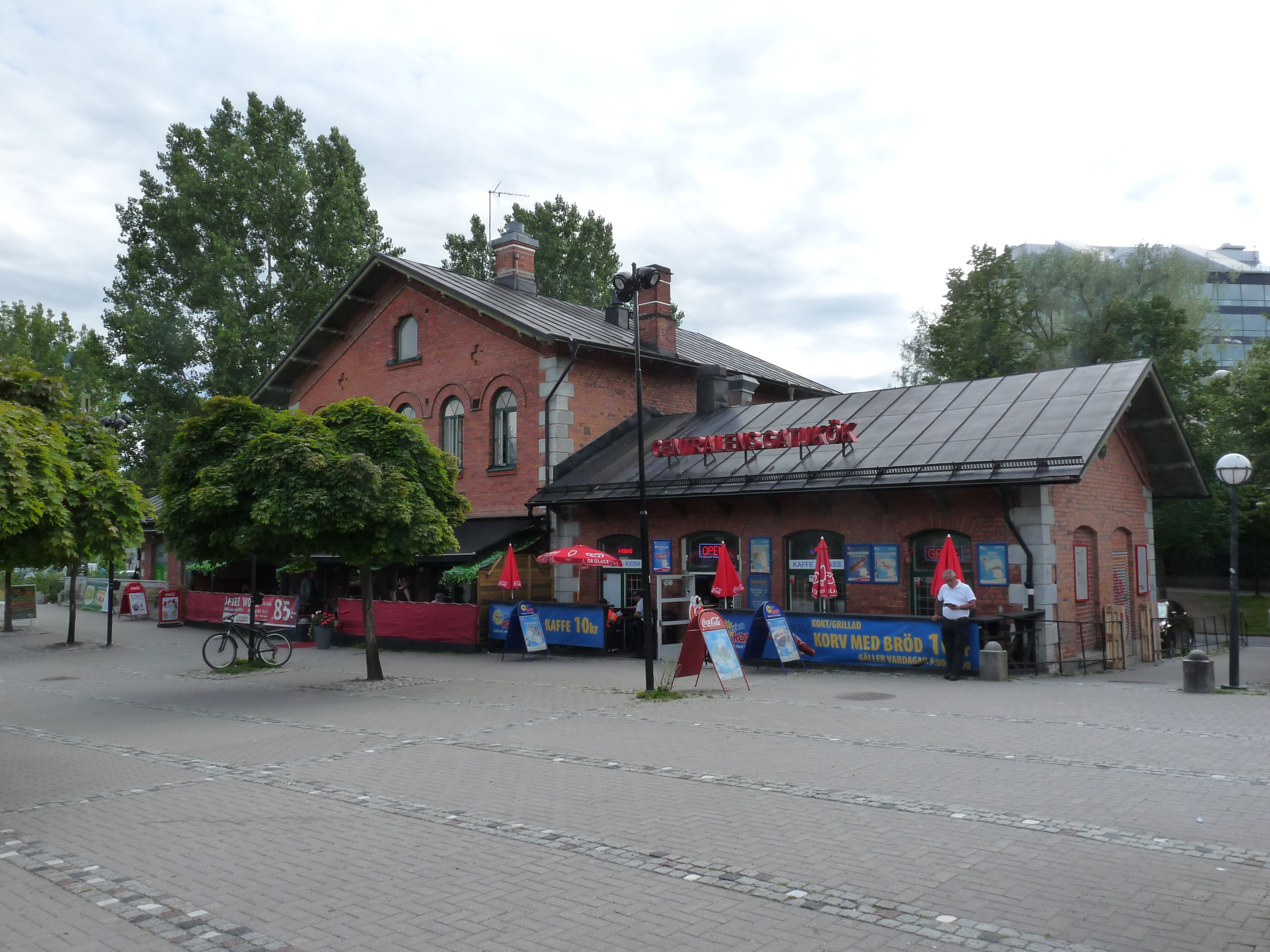
Original Station Building

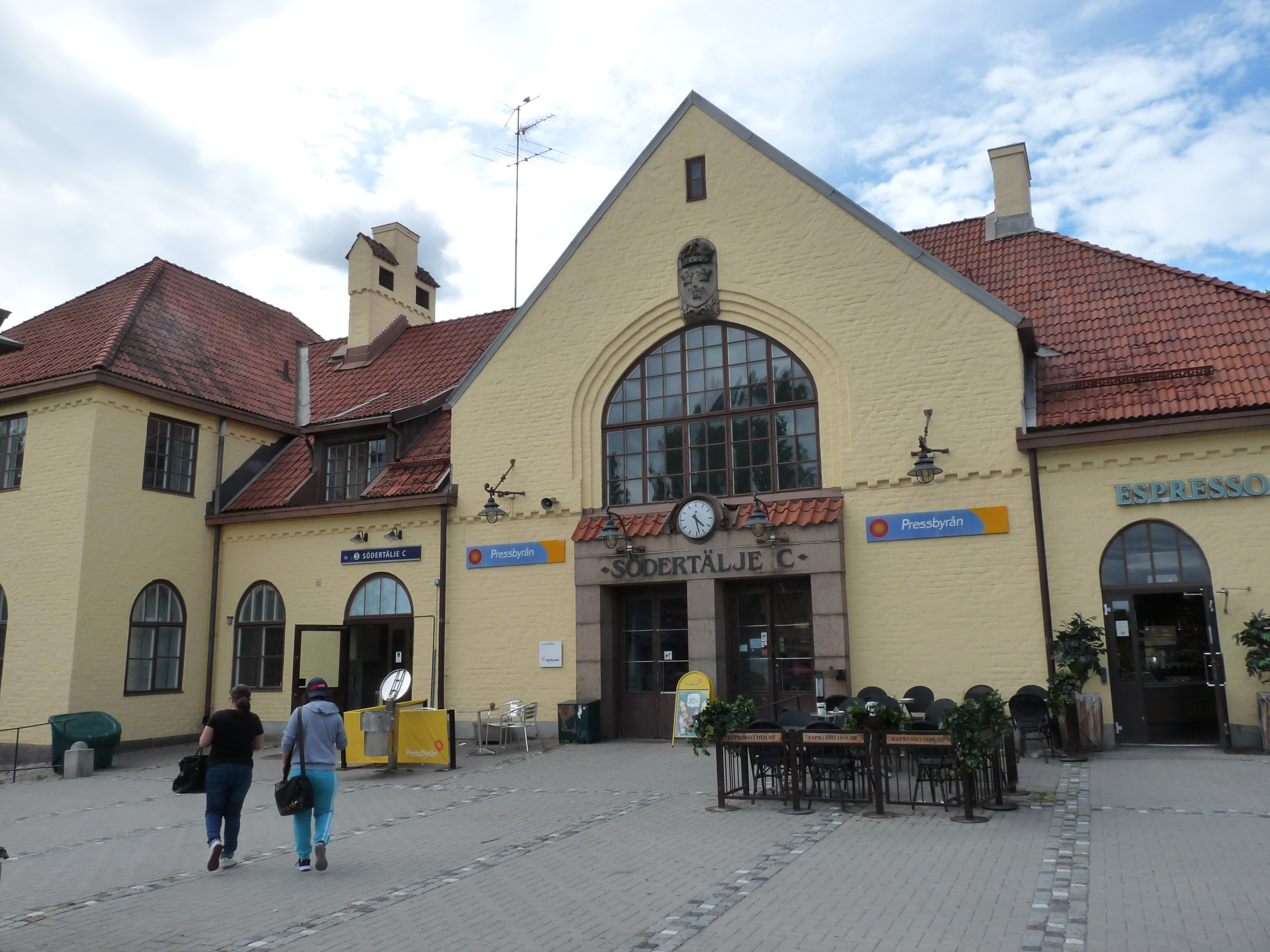
Second Station Building

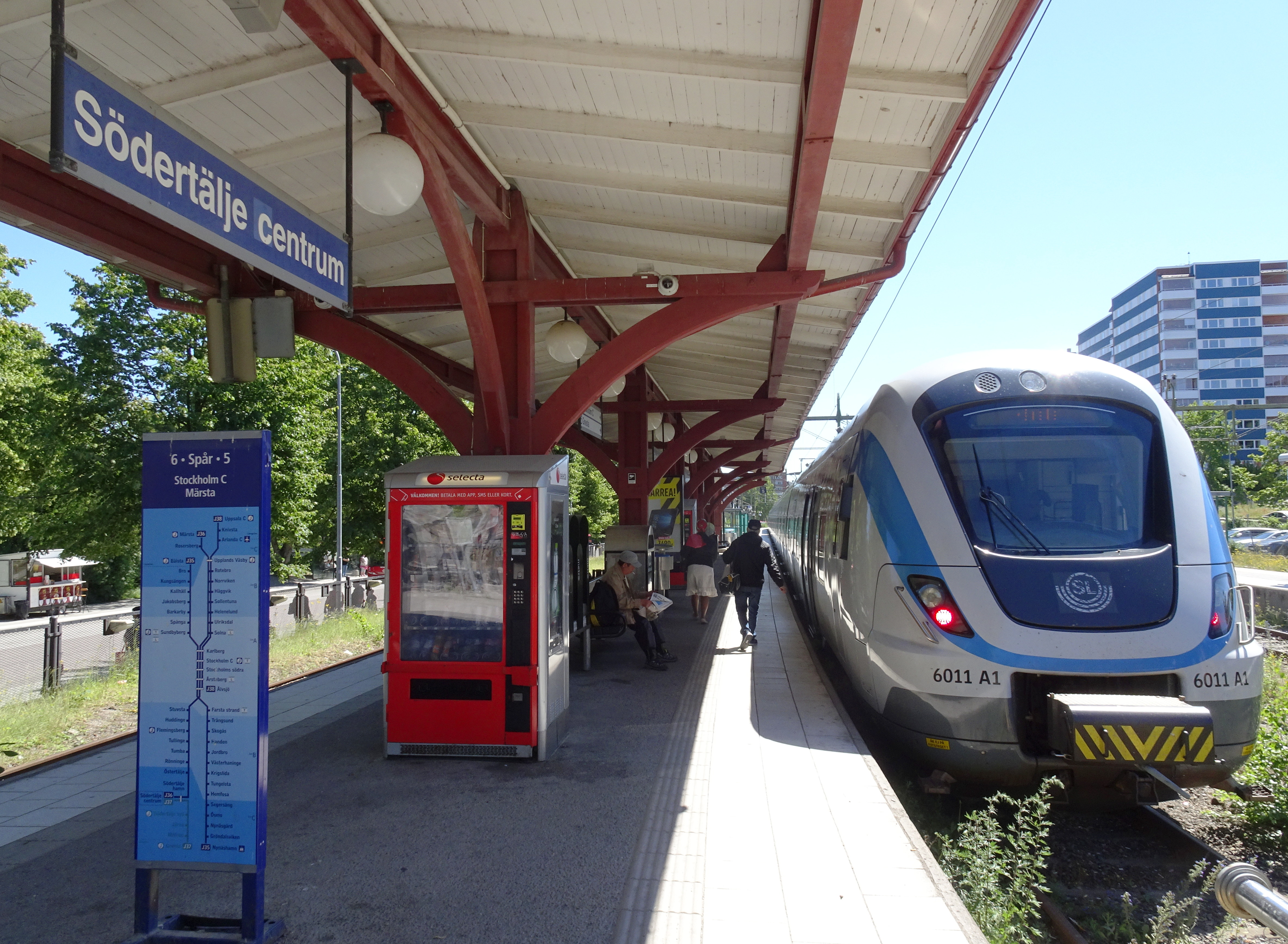
Platforms

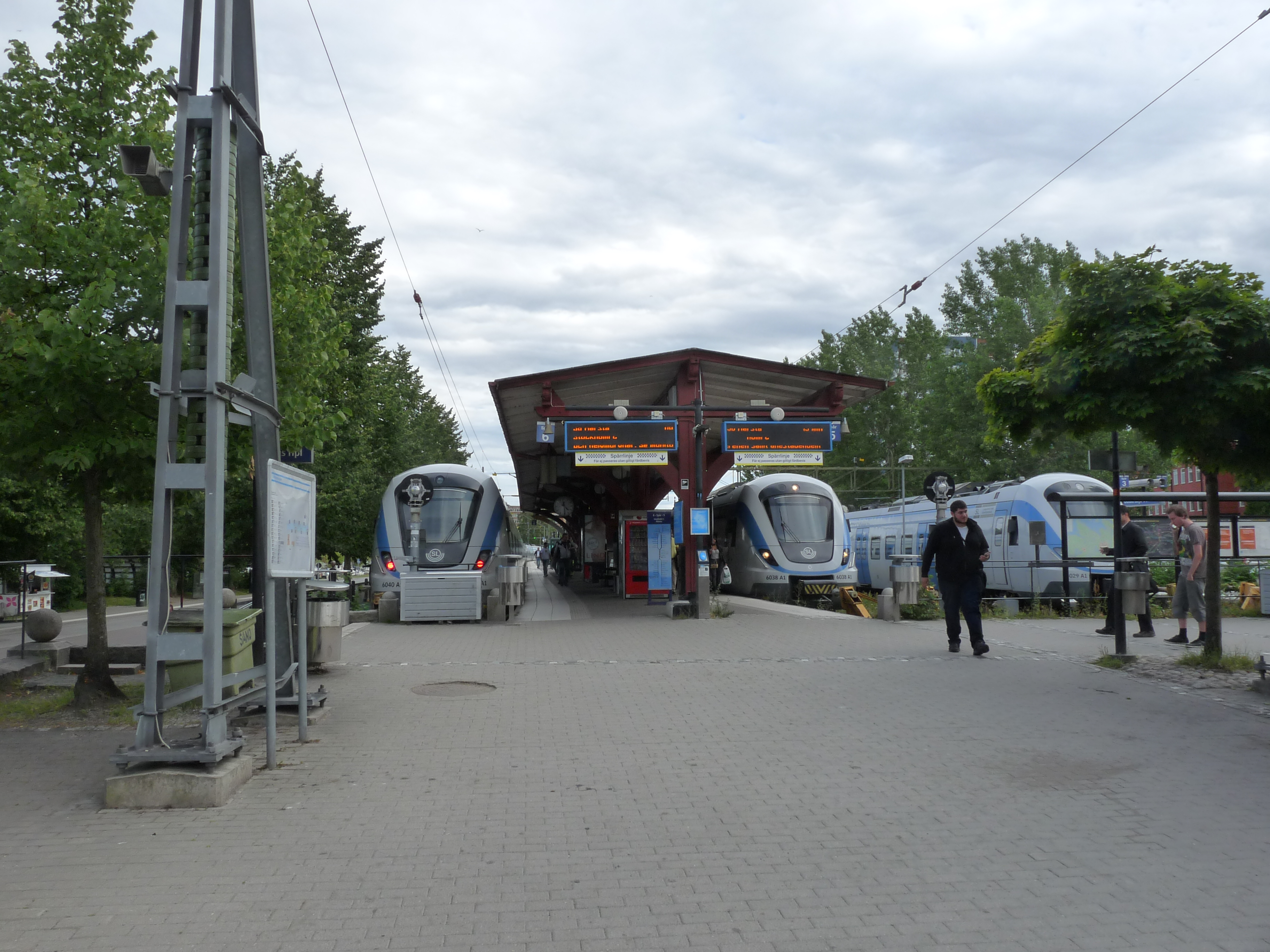
Platforms
