= Märsta railway station =

Railway station in Sigtuna Municipality, Sweden

Märsta
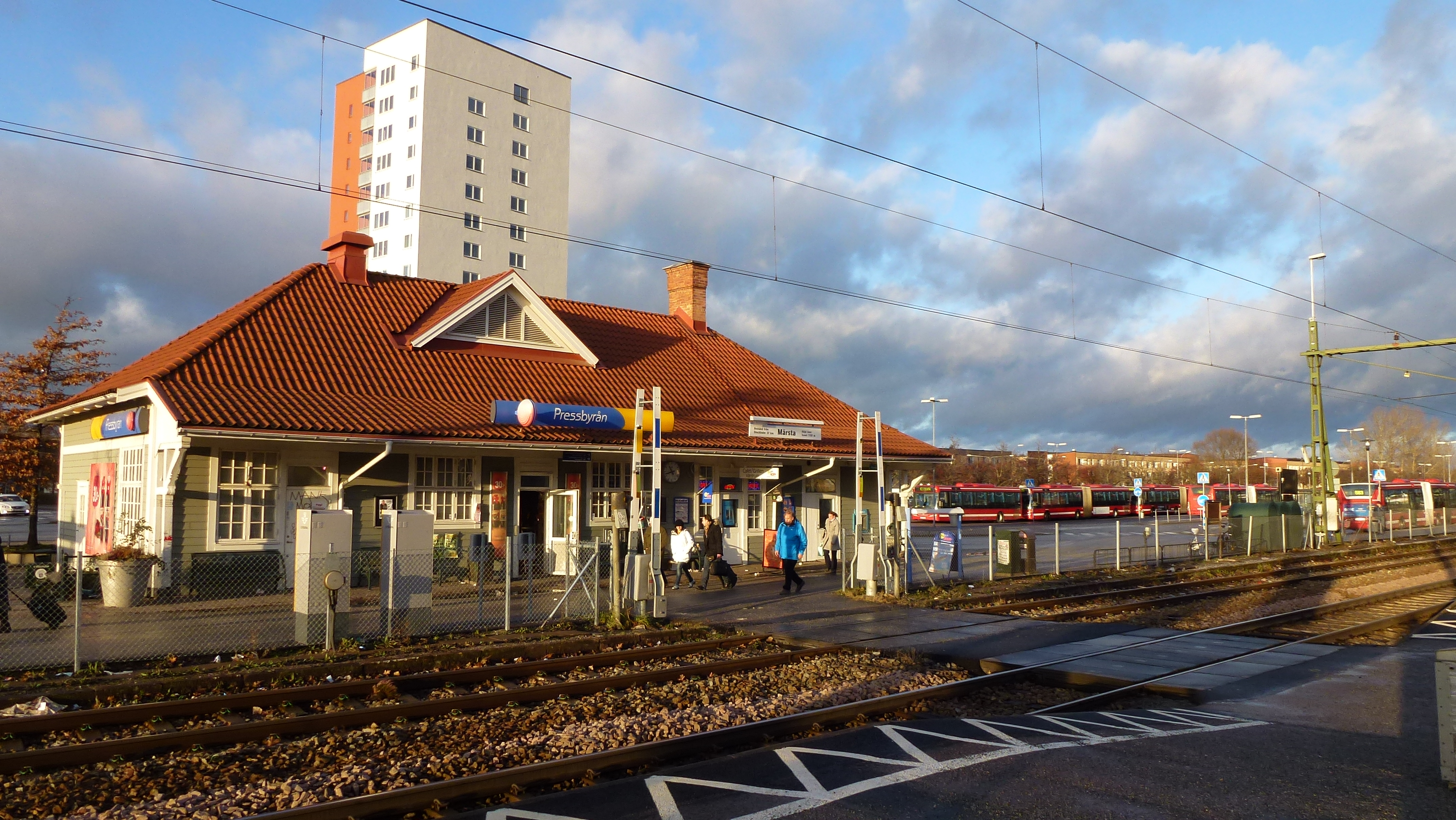
- Märsta Station

General information
- Location: Märsta, Sigtuna Municipality, Stockholm County; Sweden
- Coordinates: 59°37′41″N 17°51′41″E
- System: Pendeltåg, SJ Regional Trains
- Operator: SJ; SL
- Line: East Coast Line
- Distance: 36.5 km (22.7 mi) from Stockholm C
- Platforms: 2
- Tracks: 4

History
- Opened: 1876
- Rebuilt: 1968 (opening of commuter rail)

Passengers
- 2019: 7,300 boarding per weekday (commuter rail)

Services
Preceding station	Stockholm commuter rail	Following station
Terminus	41	Rosersberg towards Södertälje Centrum
Terminus	42X	Rosersberg towards Nynäshamn
SJ Regional Trains
Location
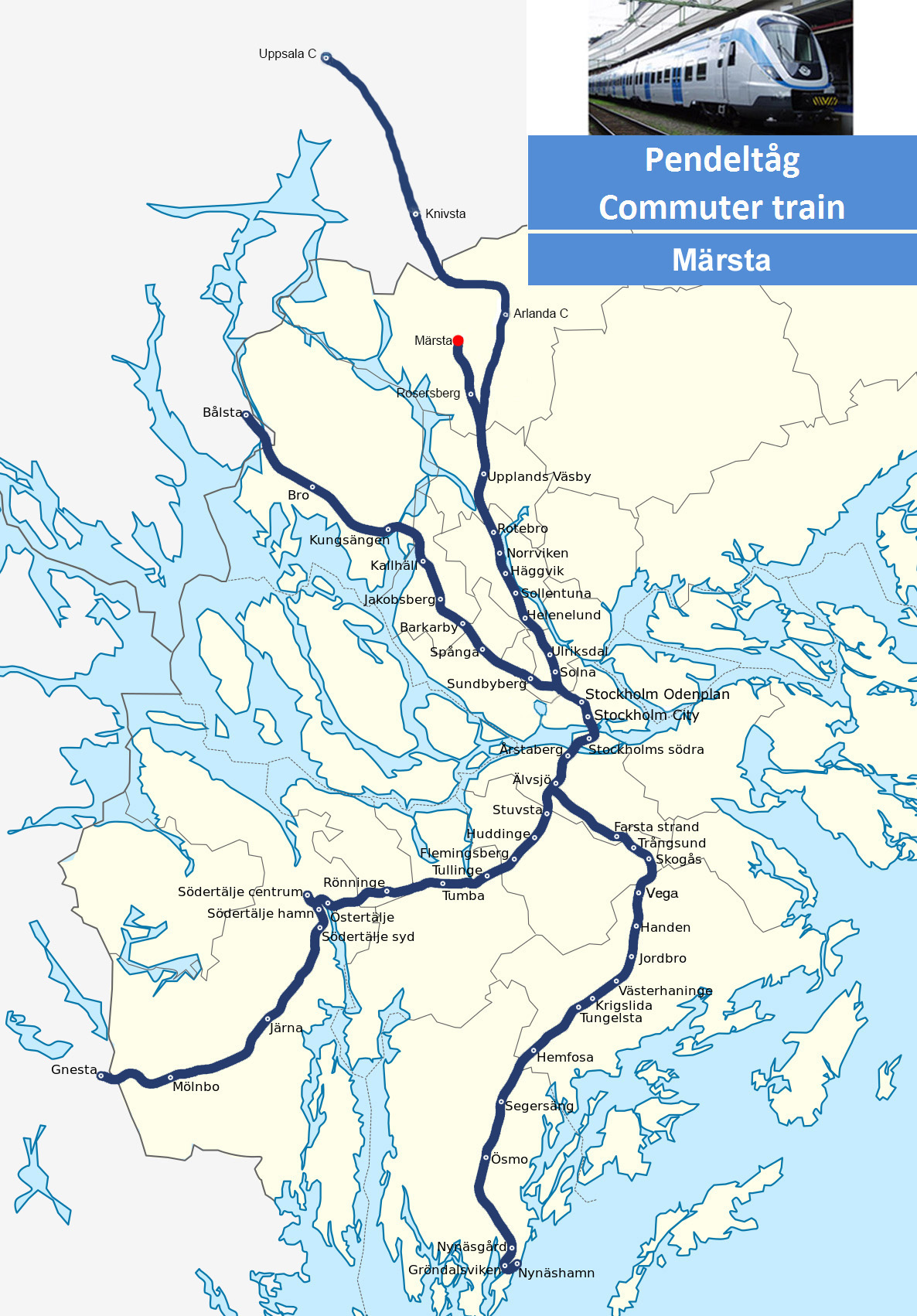

Märsta railway station is a railway station located in Märsta in Sigtuna Municipality, Stockholm County, Sweden. Situated 36.5 km north of Stockholm Central Station, it lies on the East Coast Line (Swedish: Ostkustbanan). The station serves long-distance and regional SJ trains and, since 1968, has been the northern terminus for Stockholm's commuter trains.

The station originally opened in 1876, ten years after the inauguration of the Stockholm–Uppsala railway line. The current station building, constructed in 1914, was severely damaged by a fire in May 2000. Although demolition was initially considered, the building was ultimately rebuilt.

== Long-distance train station ==
The older part of the station serves SJ Regional Trains and consists of a platform with two through tracks. The tracks to Stockholm were doubled in 1906, followed by the tracks to Uppsala in 1908, and the line was electrified in 1934. Long-distance traffic at Märsta Station decreased after the Arlanda Line was put into use in 1999.

== Commuter train station ==
The commuter rail section of the station was built in autumn 1968, when Storstockholms Lokaltrafik (SL) took over responsibility for local rail transport within Stockholm County. It consists of a central platform with two tracks. A ticket hall and waiting area are located on the northern side of the platform. The station is a terminus, and the entrance is at grade with the street outside. The station has over 7,300 boardings on weekdays (2019) for the commuter trains. Additionally, the bus terminal has approximately 8,100 boarding passengers per weekday. Many people take a bus from Märsta to Arlanda Airport to avoid paying the surcharge to use Arlanda Central Station on the privatized Arlanda Line.

== Redevelopment plans ==
In connection with the 2014 Swedish general election, both the Social Democrats and the Moderates declared that Märsta station should be rebuilt. As of 2021, the Swedish Transport Administration is investigating and planning the reconstruction of the station. Plans for the station include the redevelopment of the Märsta railway yard, new entrances and platforms, expanded passenger waiting areas, and improved accessibility between SL and SJ trains.

== Gallery ==
=== Historic photos ===
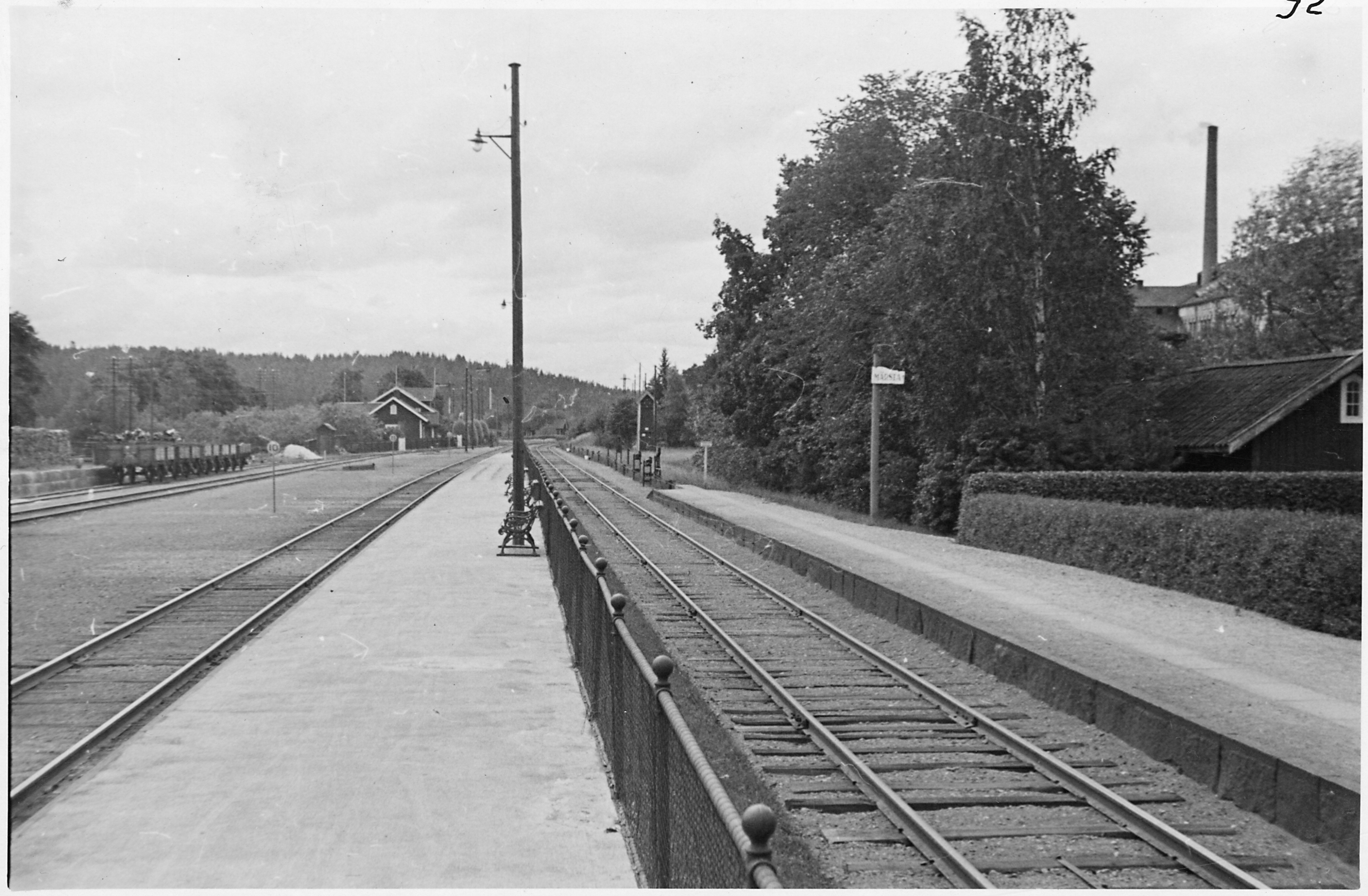

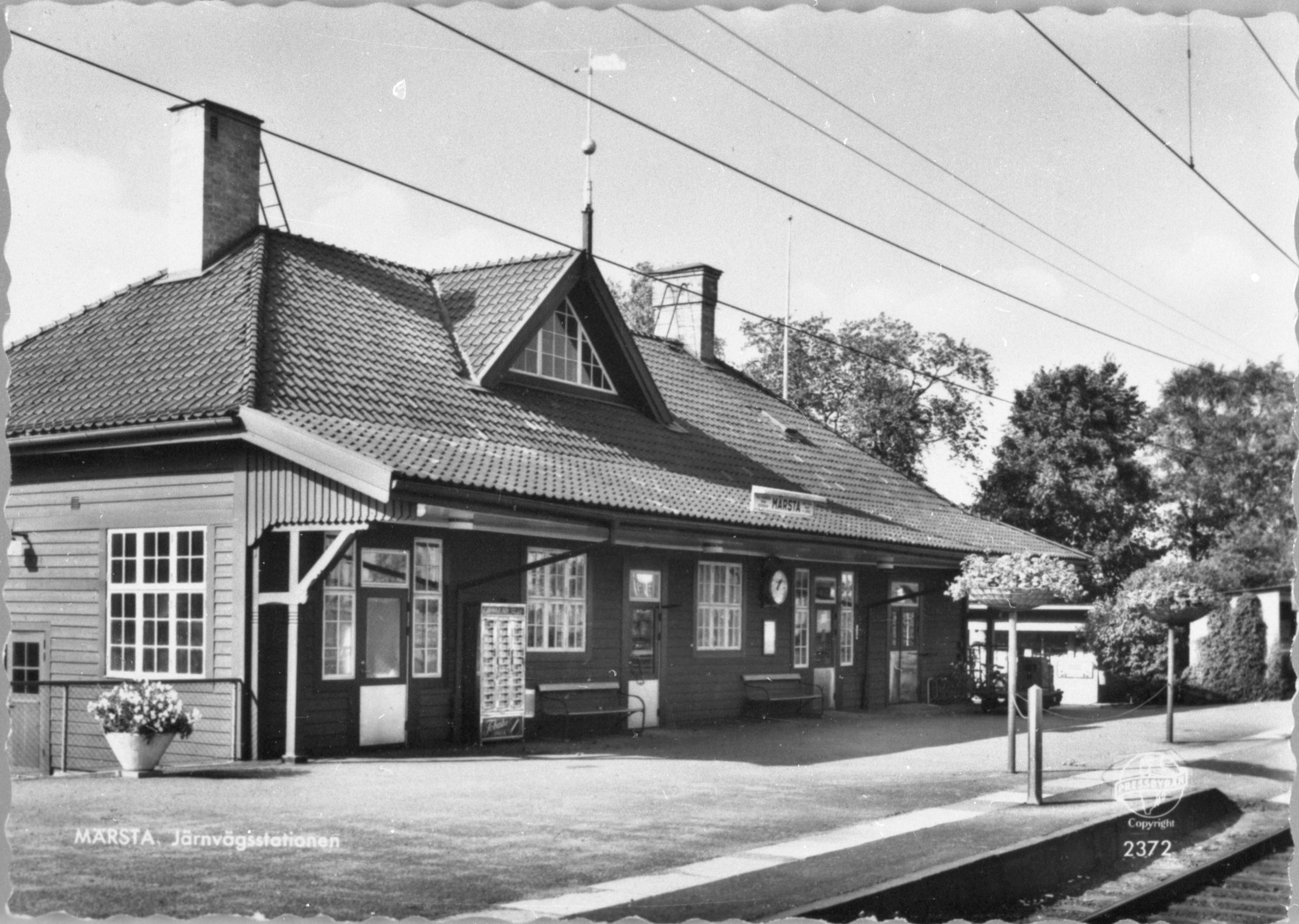

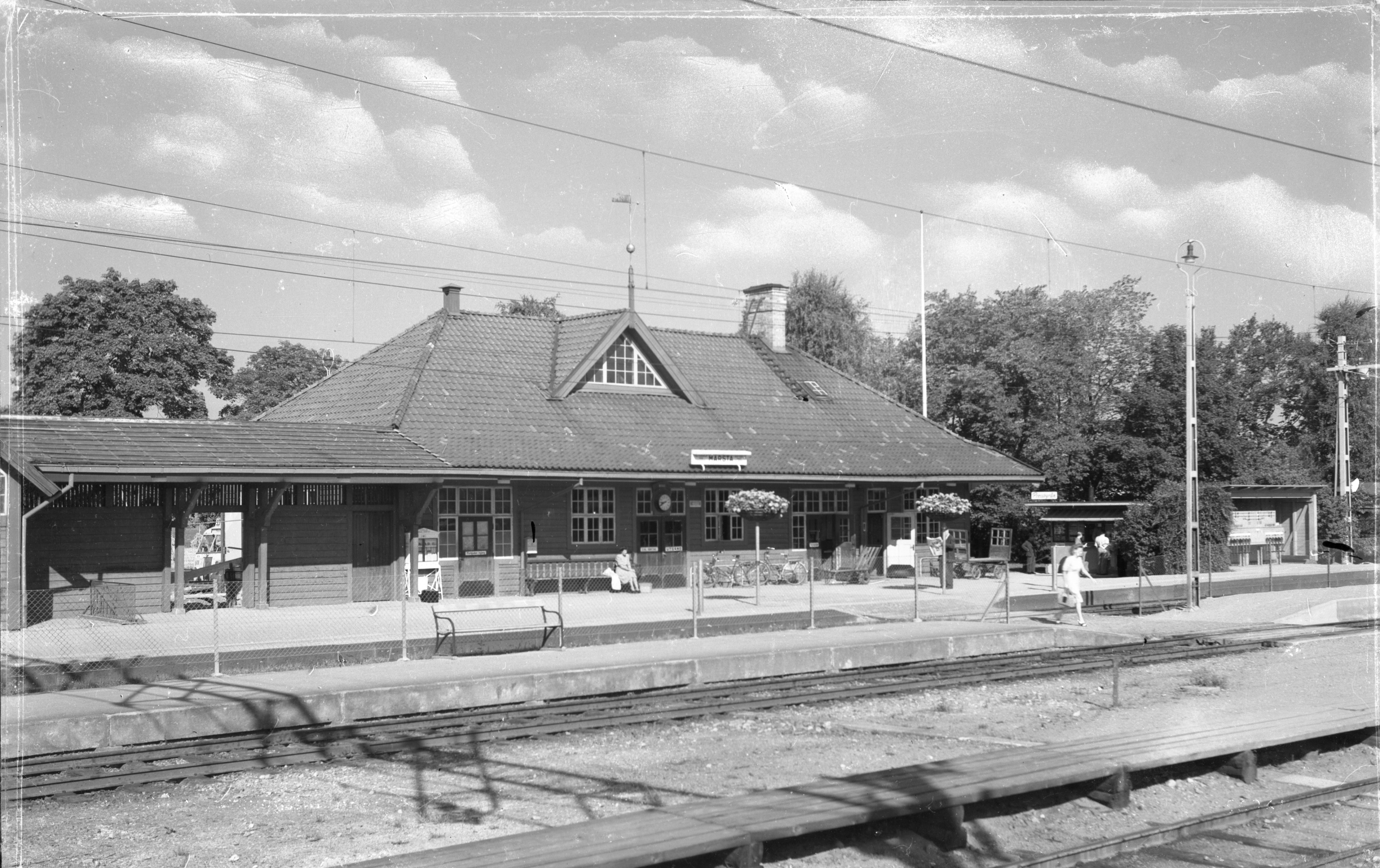

=== Station building ===
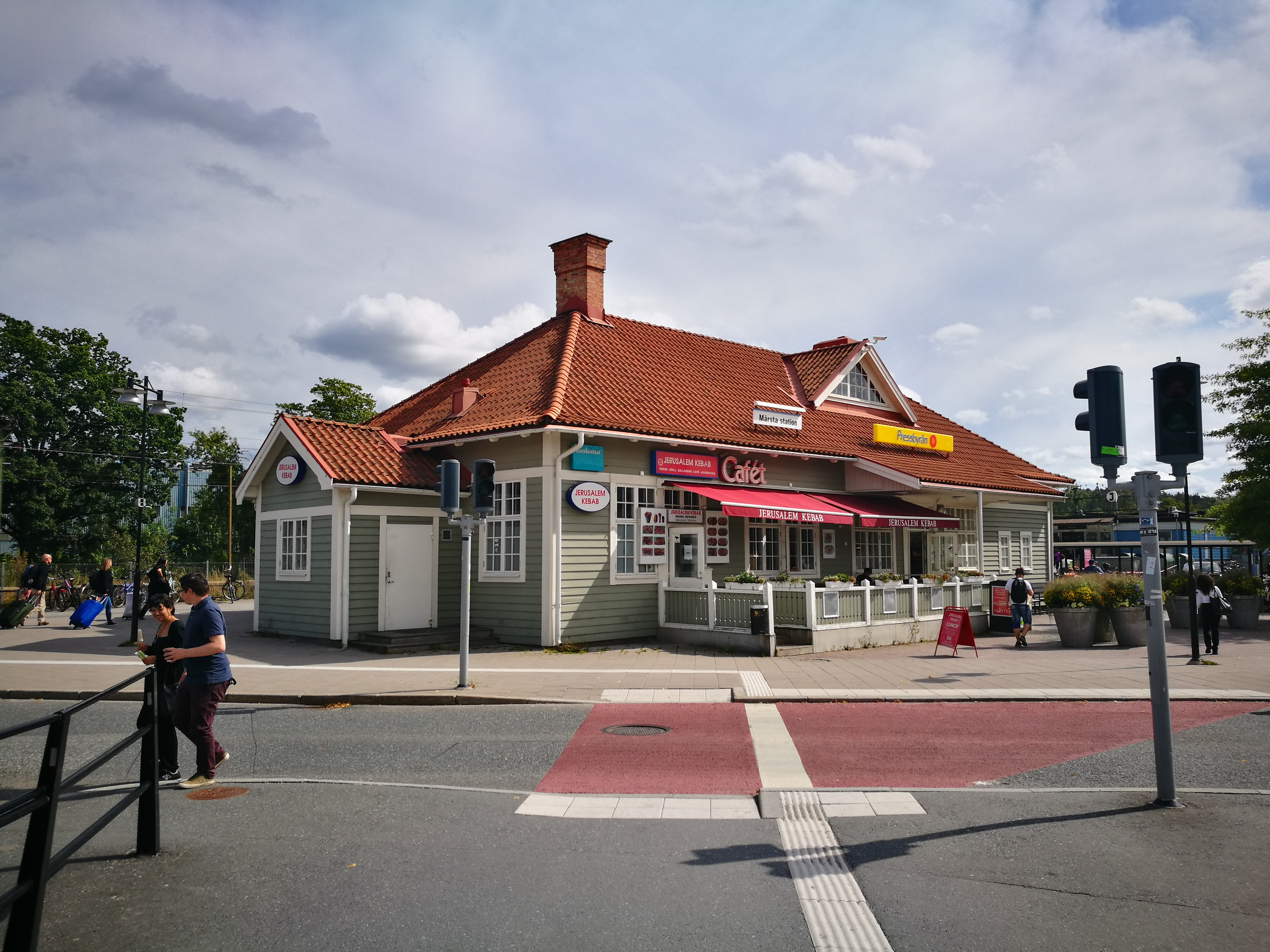

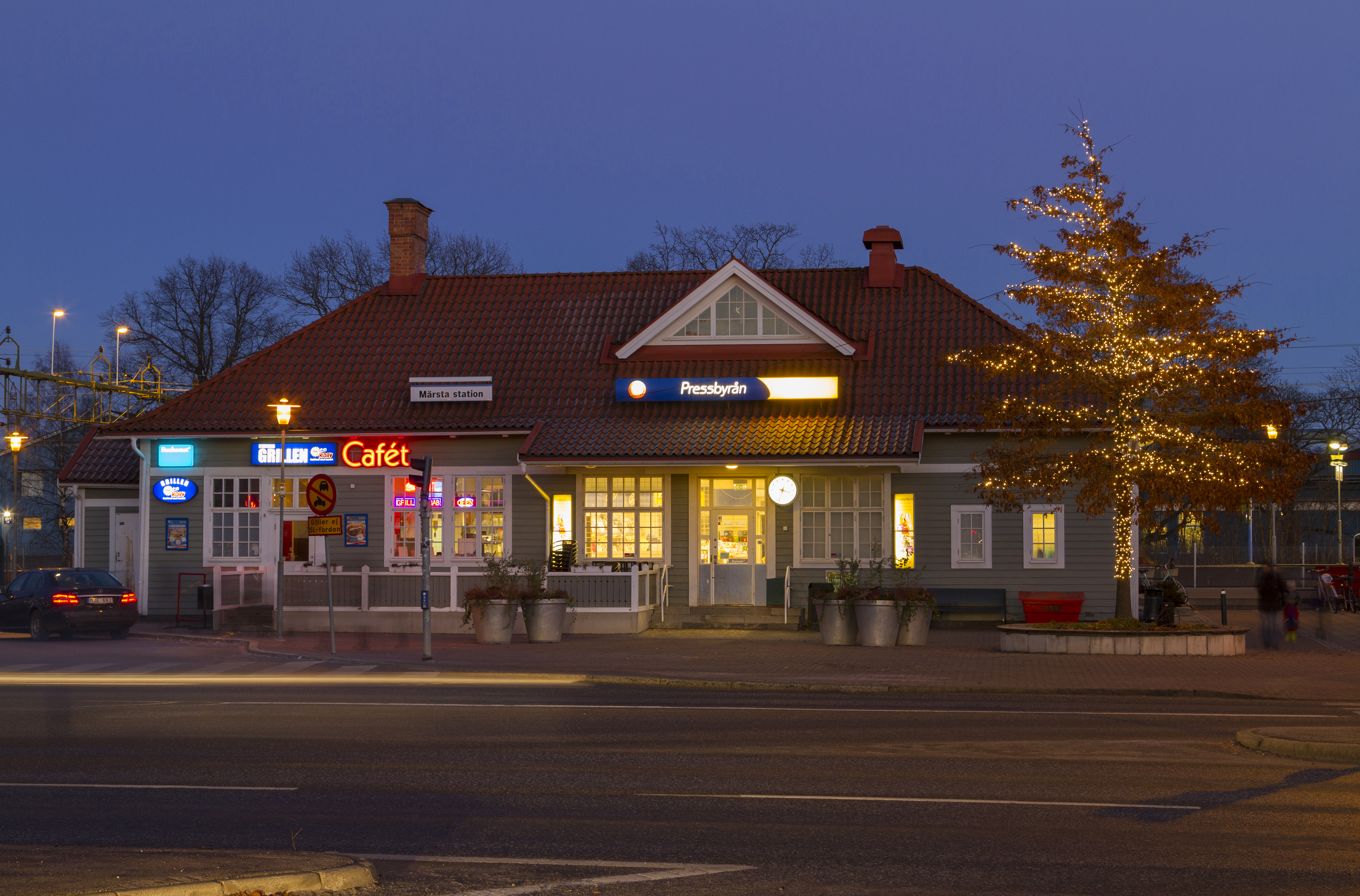

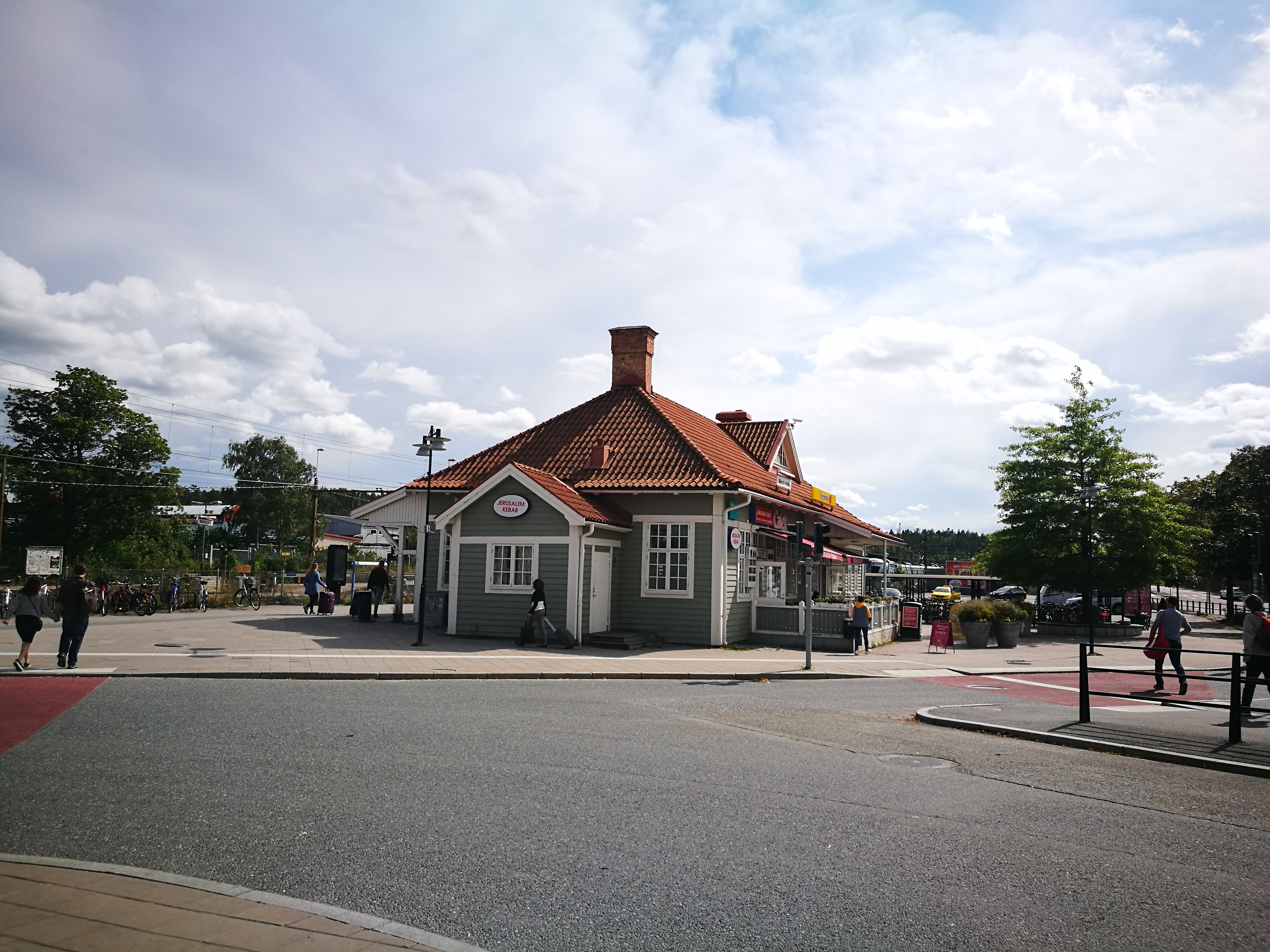

=== Long-distance train area ===
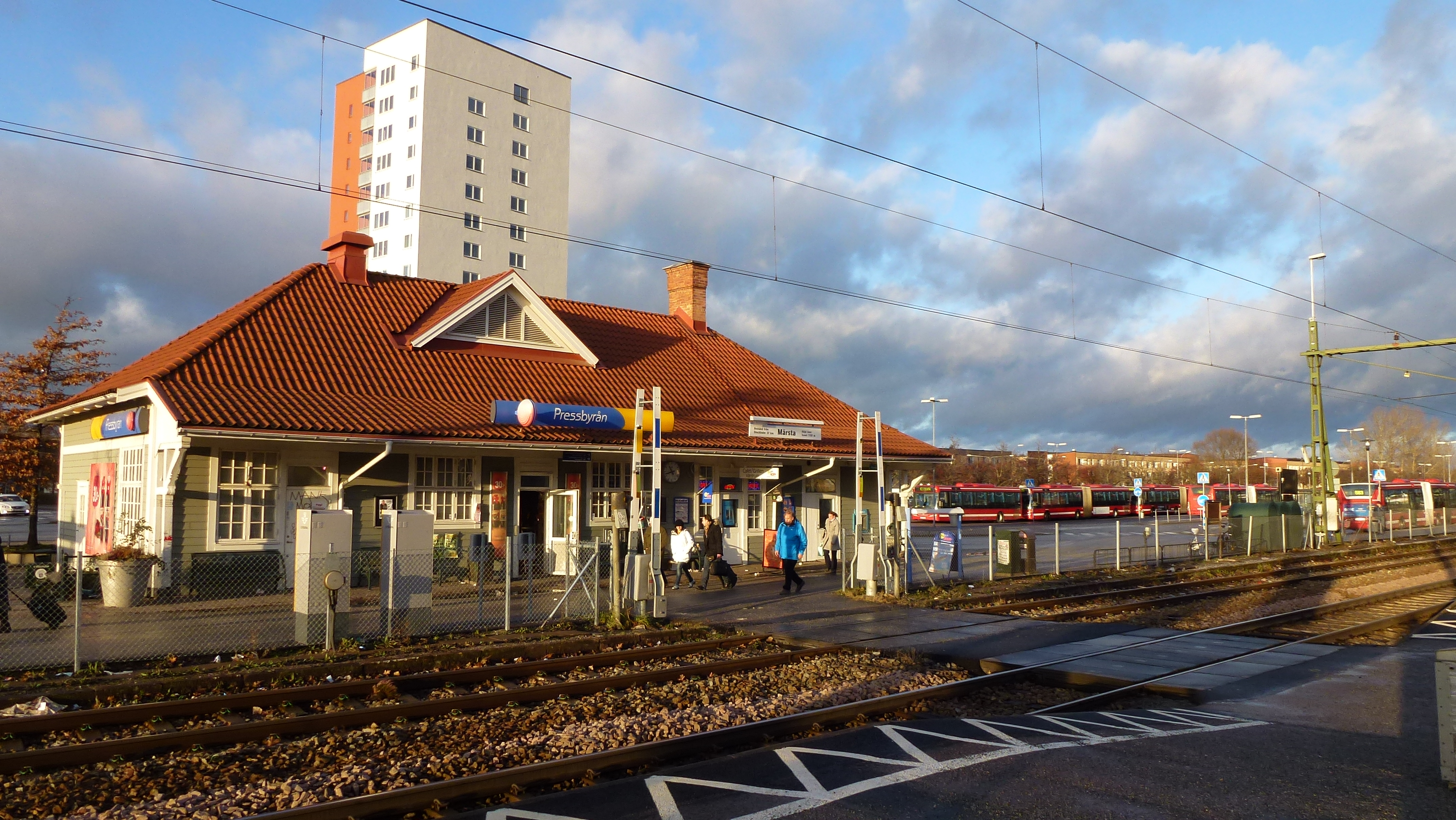

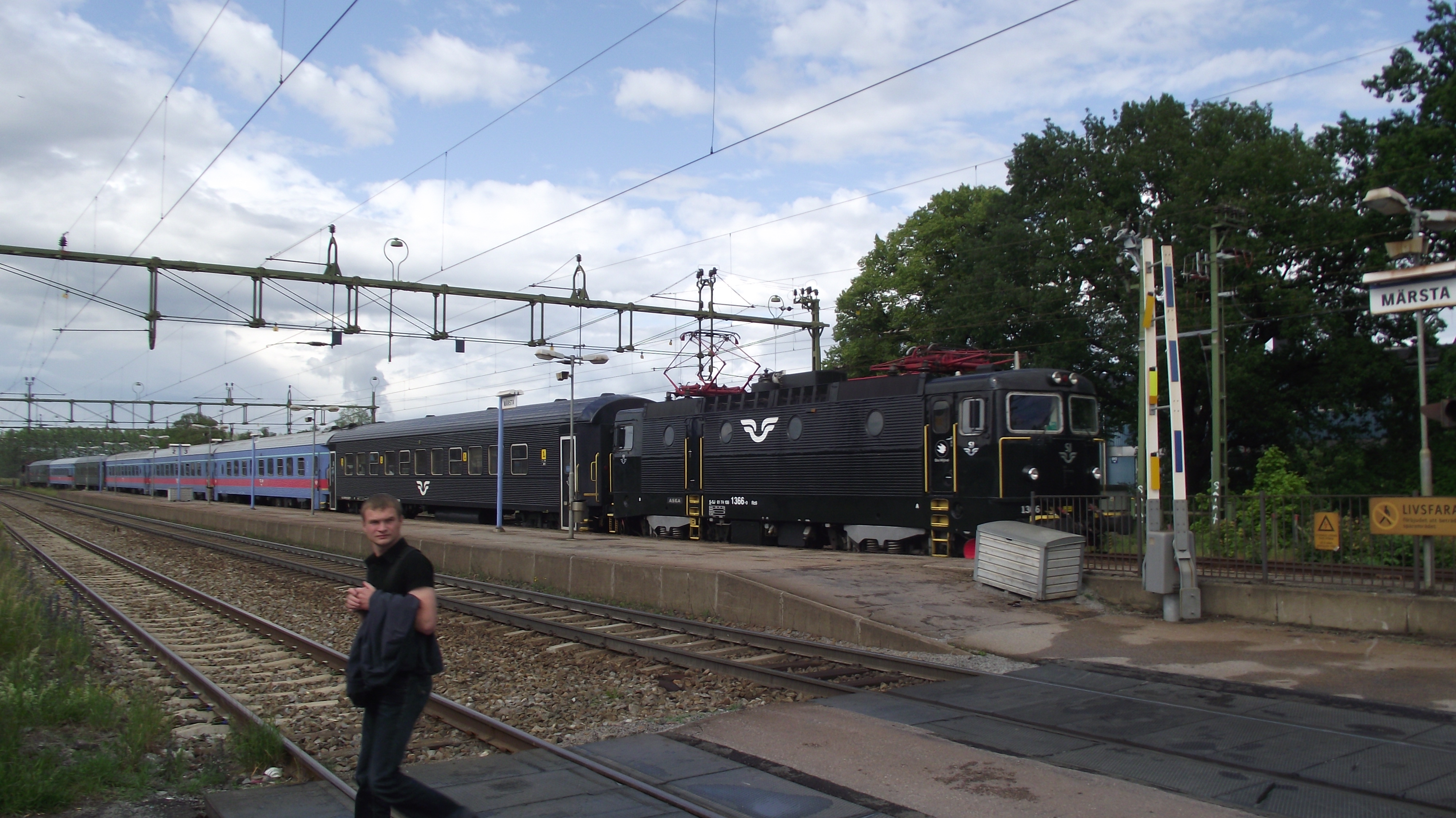

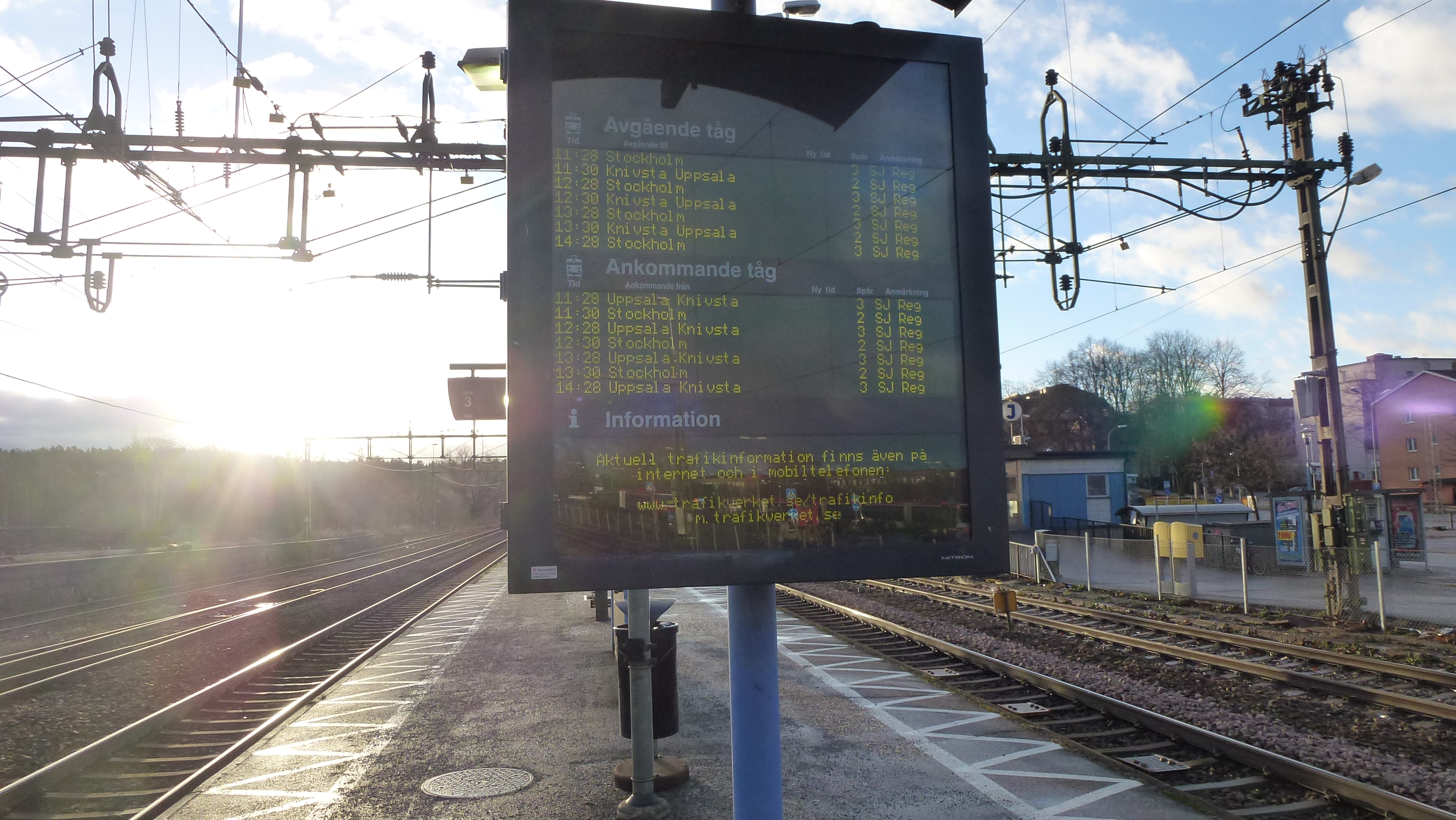

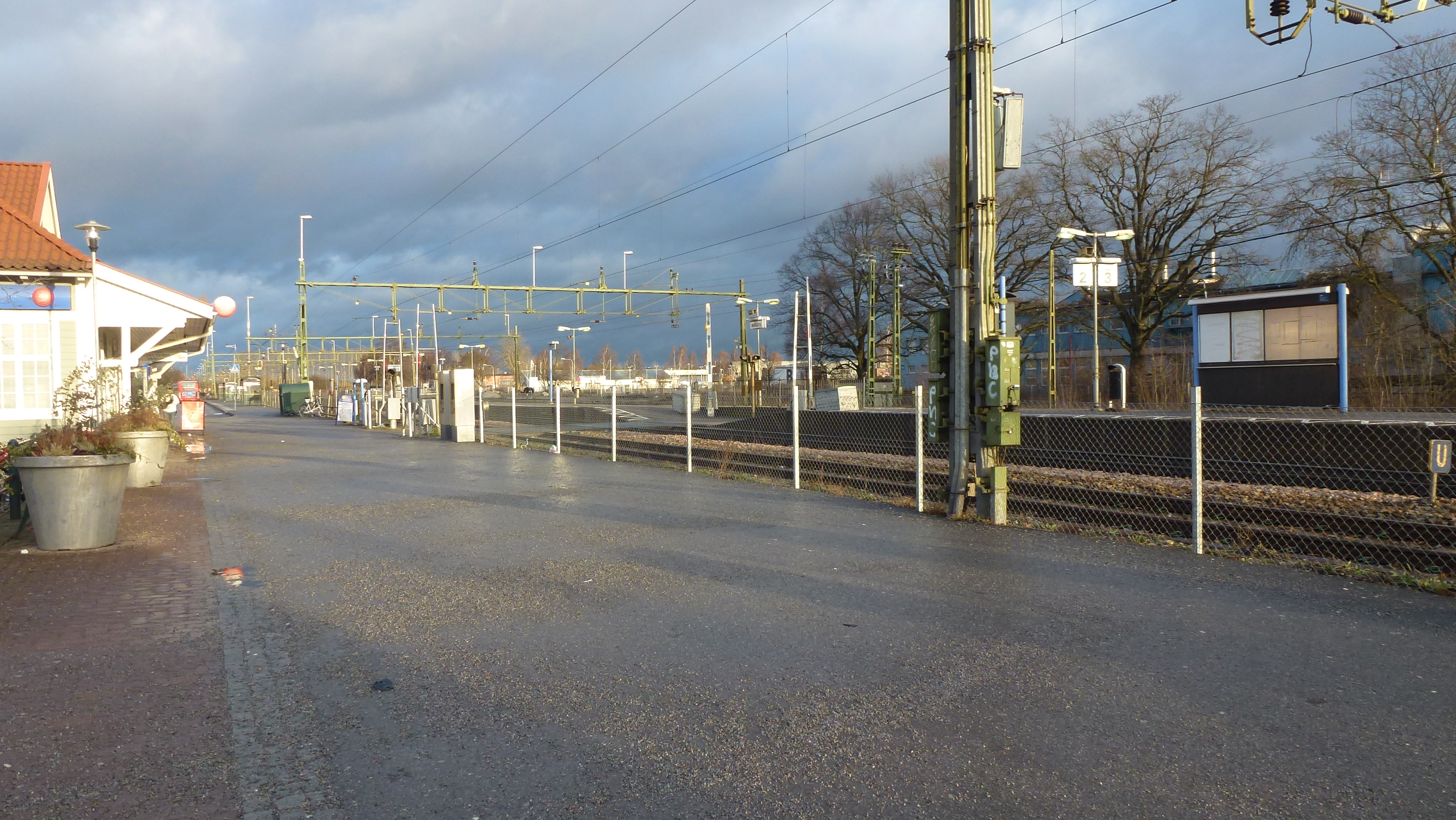

=== Commuter train area ===
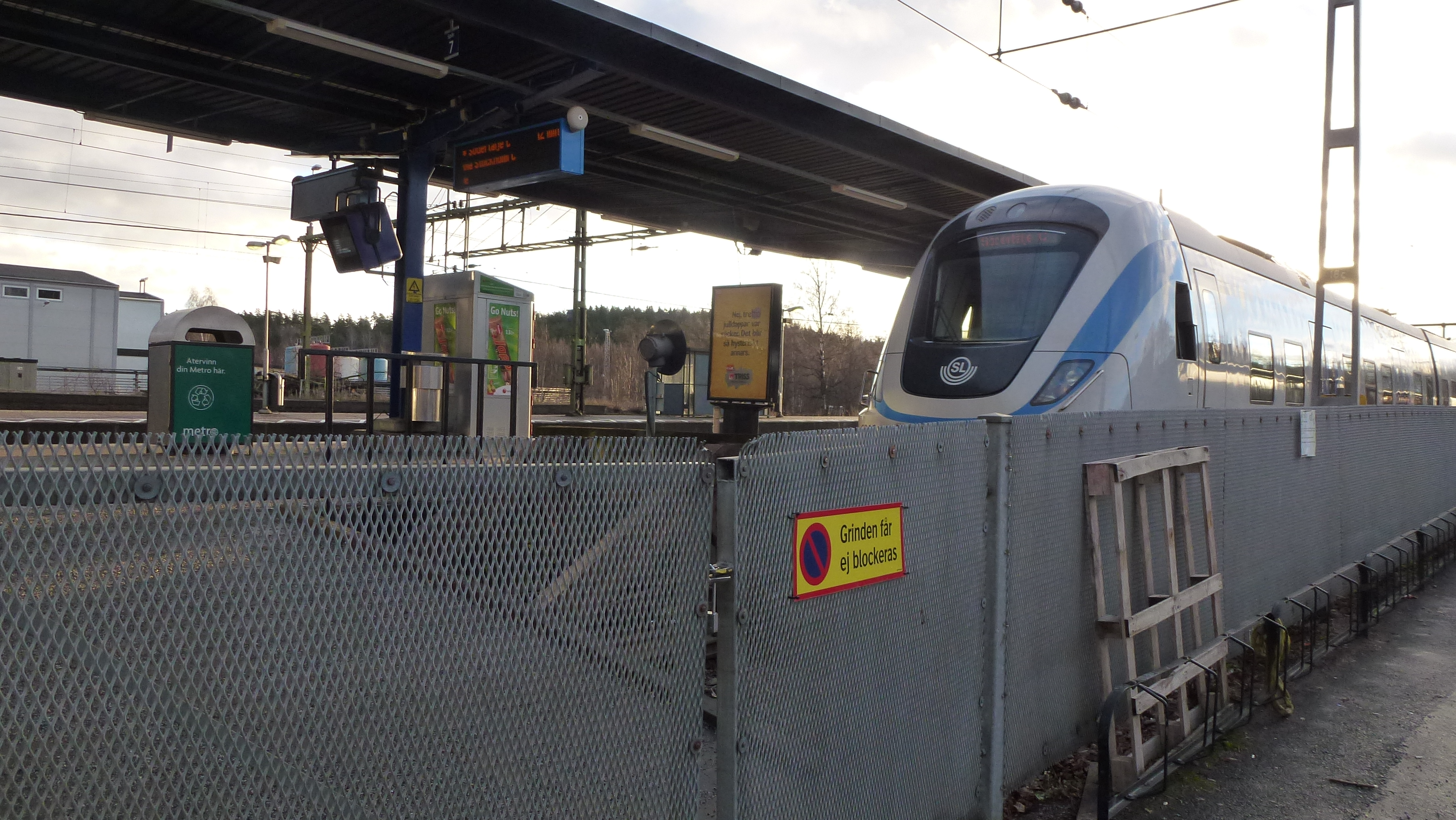

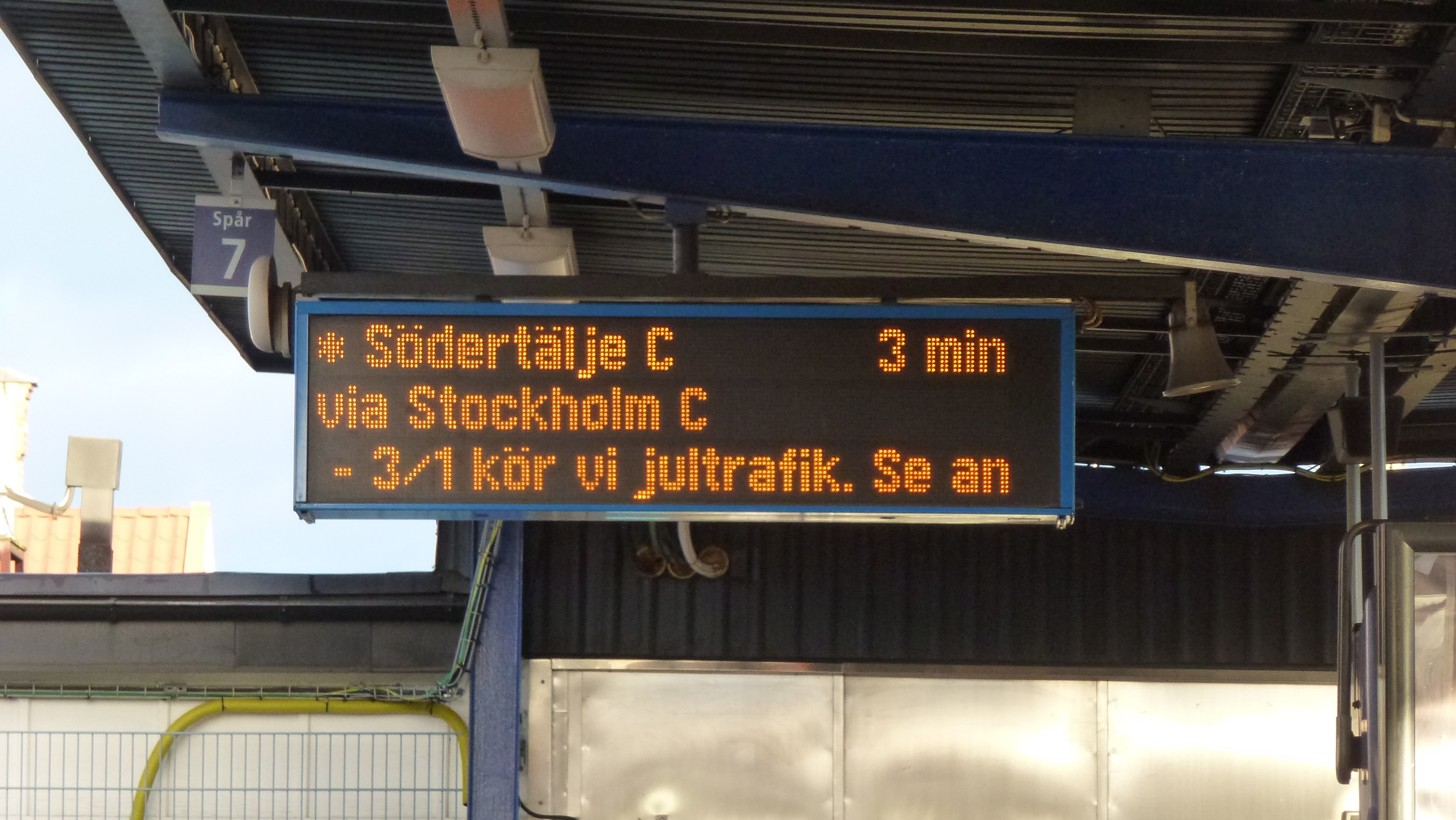

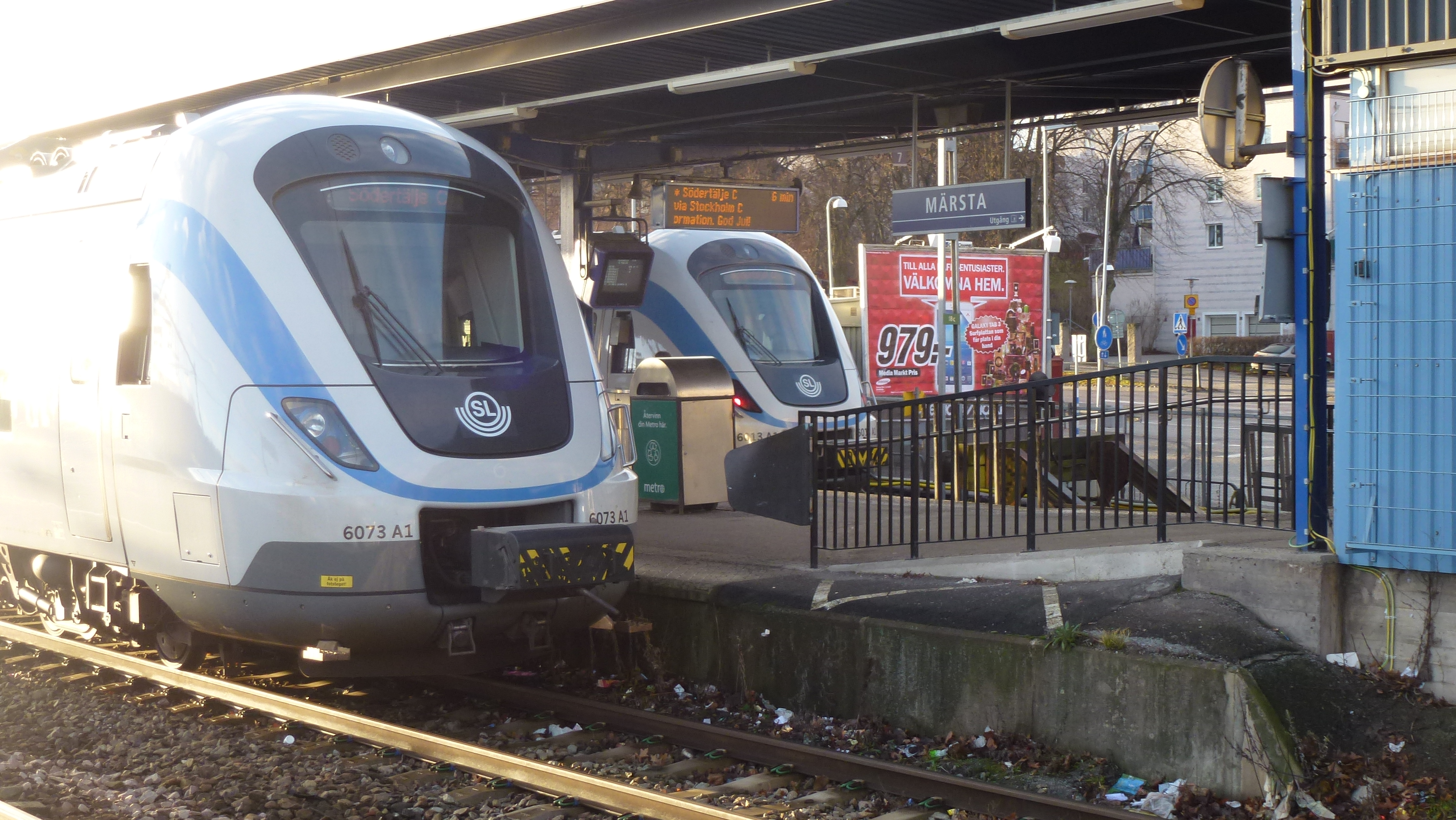

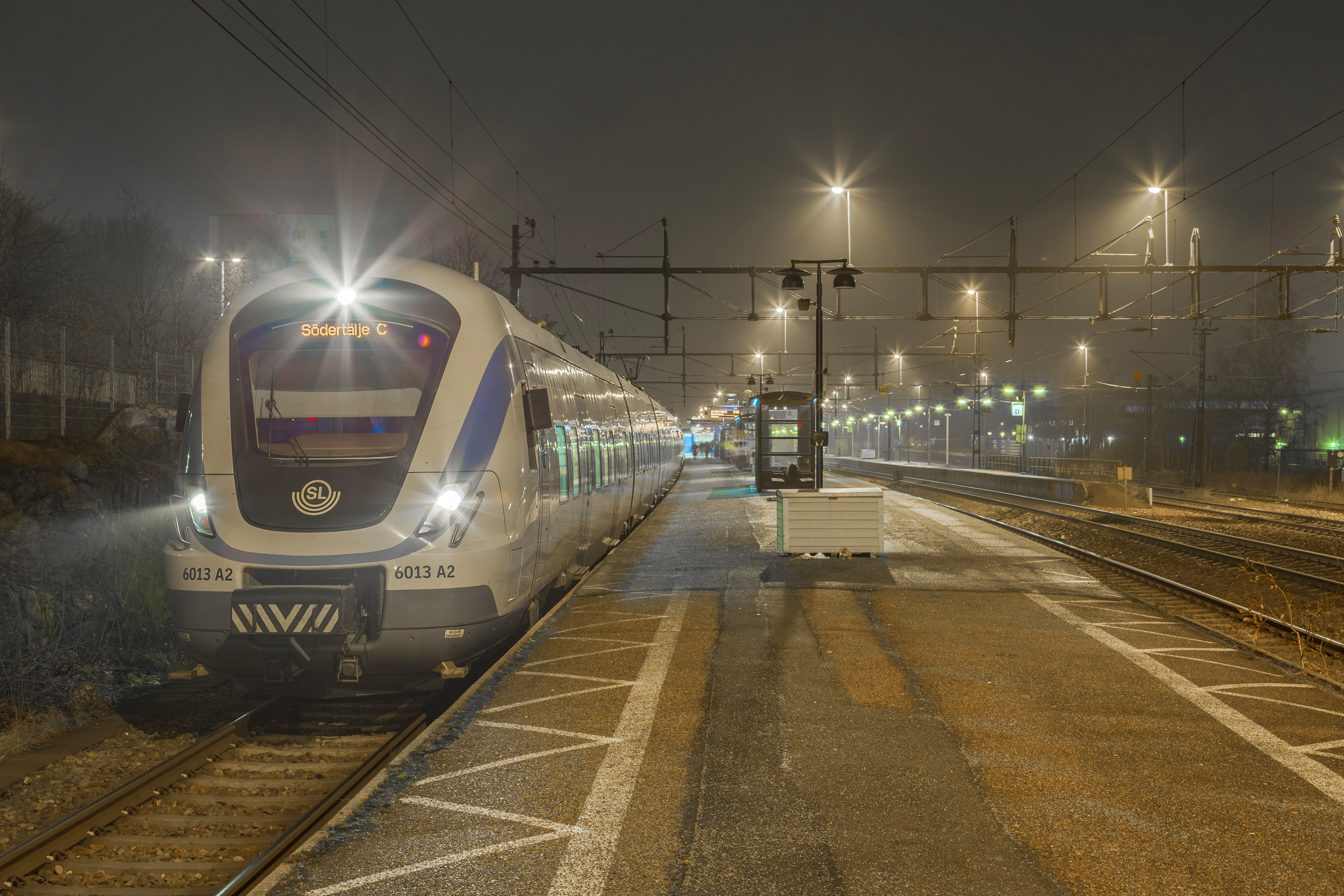
