= Mölnbo railway station =

Railway station in Mölnbo, Sweden

Mölnbo
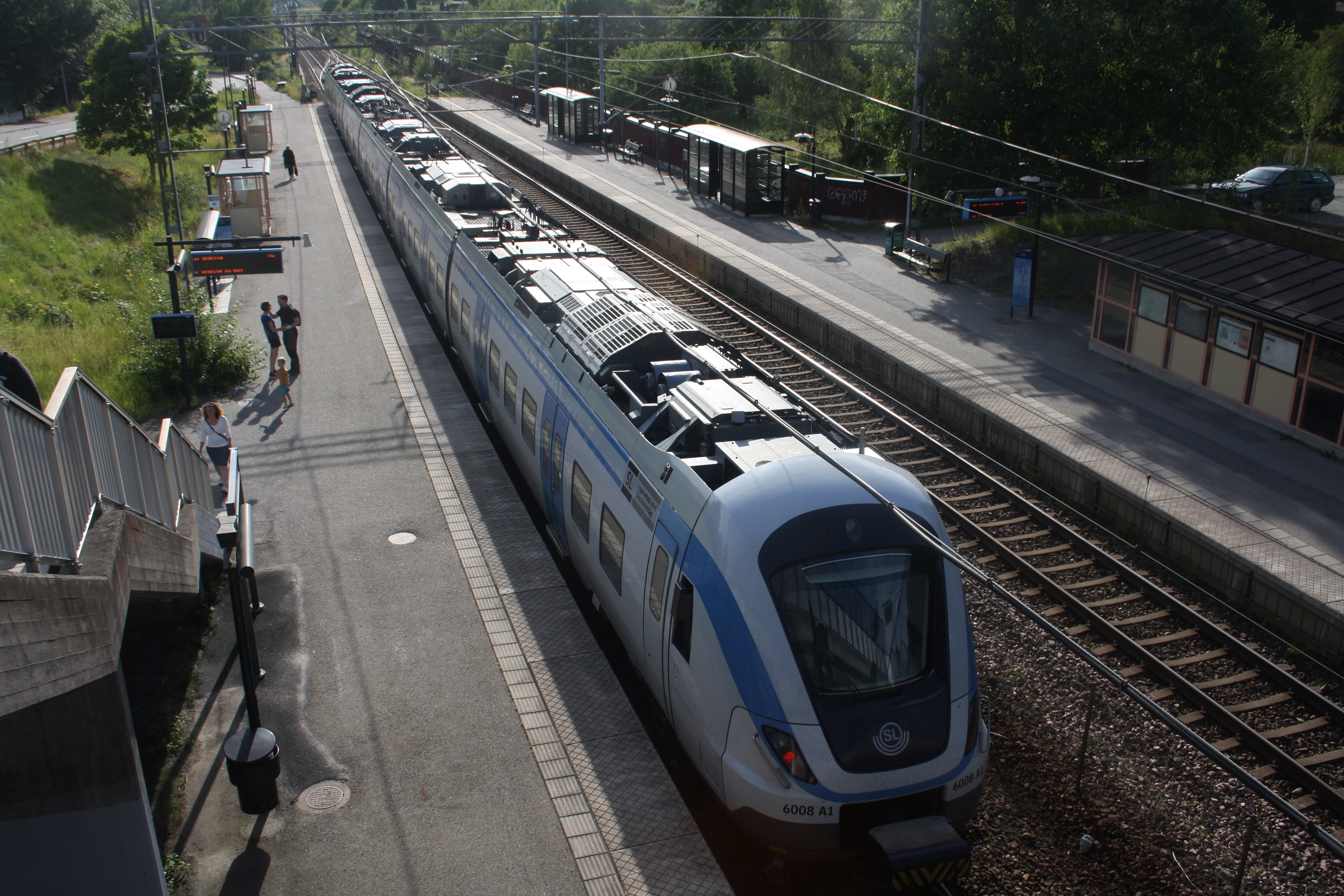
- Mölnbo station

General information
- Location: Mölnbo, Södertälje Municipality, Stockholm County; Sweden
- Coordinates: 59.0474°N 17.4182°E
- System: Pendeltåg
- Owner: Swedish Transport Administration
- Line: Western Main Line
- Platforms: 2 Side Platforms
- Tracks: 2
- Connections: Bus connections

Construction
- Structure type: At-grade

Other information
- Station code: Mö

History
- Opened: 1861
- Electrified: 1926

Passengers
- 2015: 1000 boarding per weekday (2015)

Services
Preceding station	Stockholm commuter rail	Following station
Gnesta Terminus	48	Järna towards Södertälje centrum
Location

Mölnbo is a station on Stockholm's commuter rail network, located in the locality of Mölnbo within Södertälje Municipality on the Western Main Line. The station has two side platforms and serves commuter trains between Gnesta and Södertälje centrum. As of 2015, the station had approximately 1,000 boarding passengers per weekday.

== History ==
The station was established when the Western Main Line, passing through Mölnbo, was inaugurated in 1861, with electric traction introduced in 1926. Double tracks were extended eastward to Järna in 1946 and westward past Gnesta to Björnlunda in 1950.

=== Old station building ===
The original station building was constructed in 1862 near Mölnbo Manor, which operated a mill, sawmill, and lime kiln. It was likely designed by the SJ's architect Adolf Edelsvärd and follows the so-called “Gnesta model”, a rural timber station type developed in the mid-19th century. This architectural style is characterised by a rectangular floor plan, horizontal weatherboarding on the ground floor, vertical boarding with decorative fretwork on the upper floor, and carved rafter ends beneath an extended open eave. The design reflects the influence of the Swiss chalet style, which was prevalent in Swedish timber architecture during the latter half of the 19th century.

Attached to the station's eastern gable is a small freight warehouse dating from the same period. The high-set doors on the track-facing elevation and remnants of a loading platform indicate its original function. A goods depot with a similar design survives in nearby Järna.

The station building remained in operation until 1964 and was later repurposed, at one point accommodating a preschool. The yard area was expanded in 1947. Despite its historical significance, the building has faced repeated threats of demolition. In 2014, it was purchased by building conservator Terry Wheeldon for SEK 70,000 under the condition that it not be used as a dwelling. In September 2024, it was threatened by a nearby fire but sustained no major damage. Mölnbo station house is among the oldest surviving rural timber railway stations in the Stockholm region.

== Gallery ==
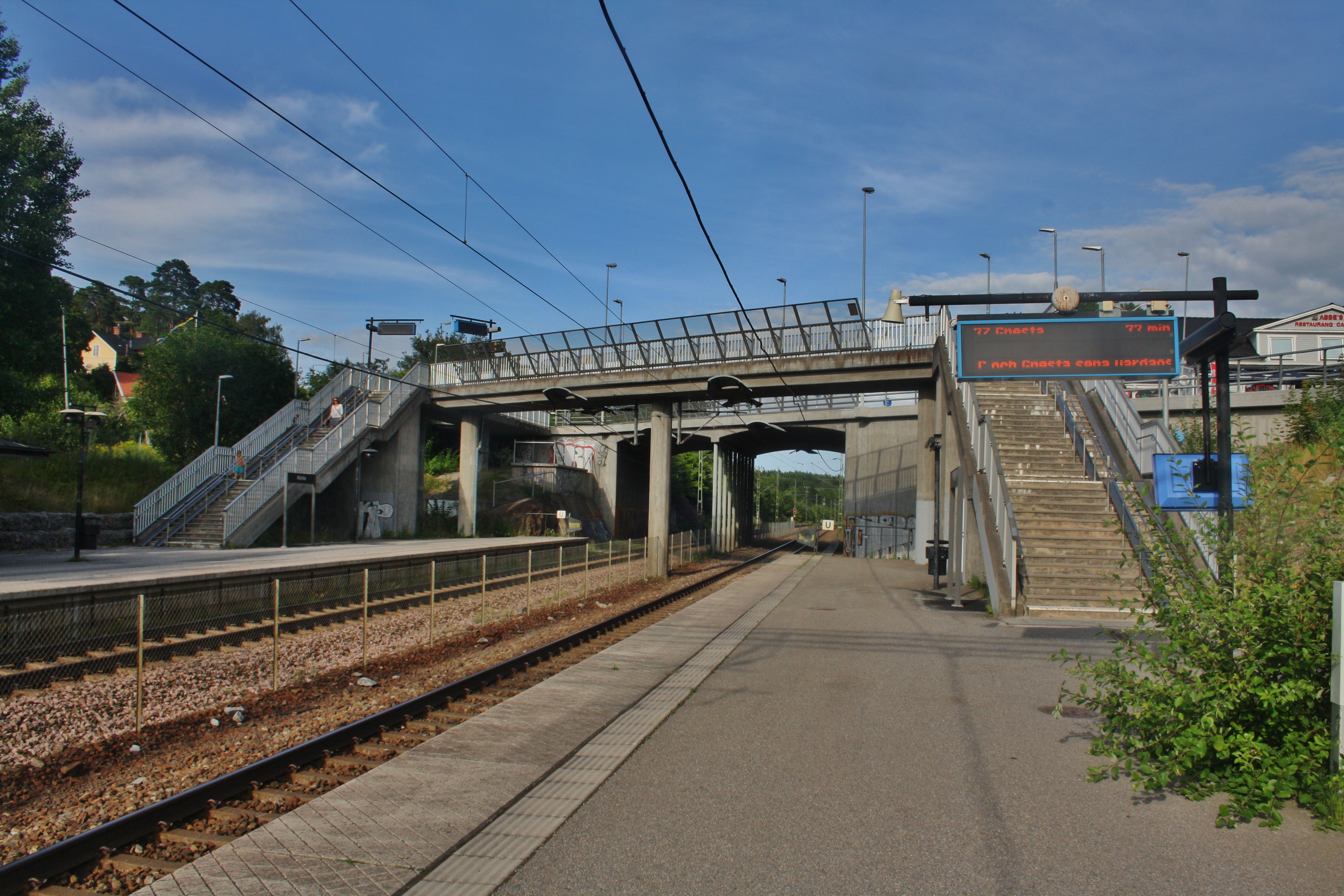
Platform at Mölnbo

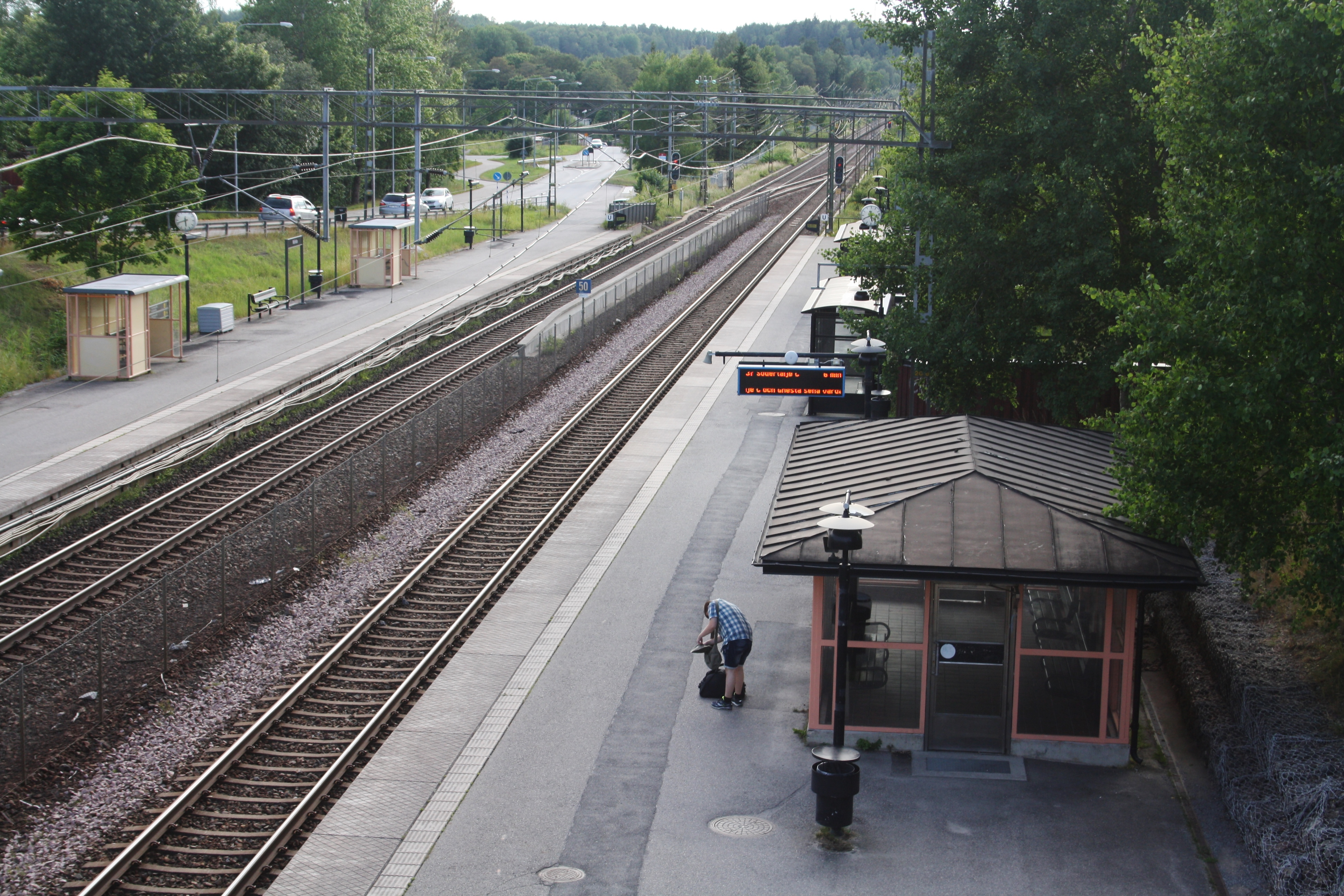
Overview of Mölnbo station
