= Järna railway station =

Railway station in Järna, Sweden

Järna
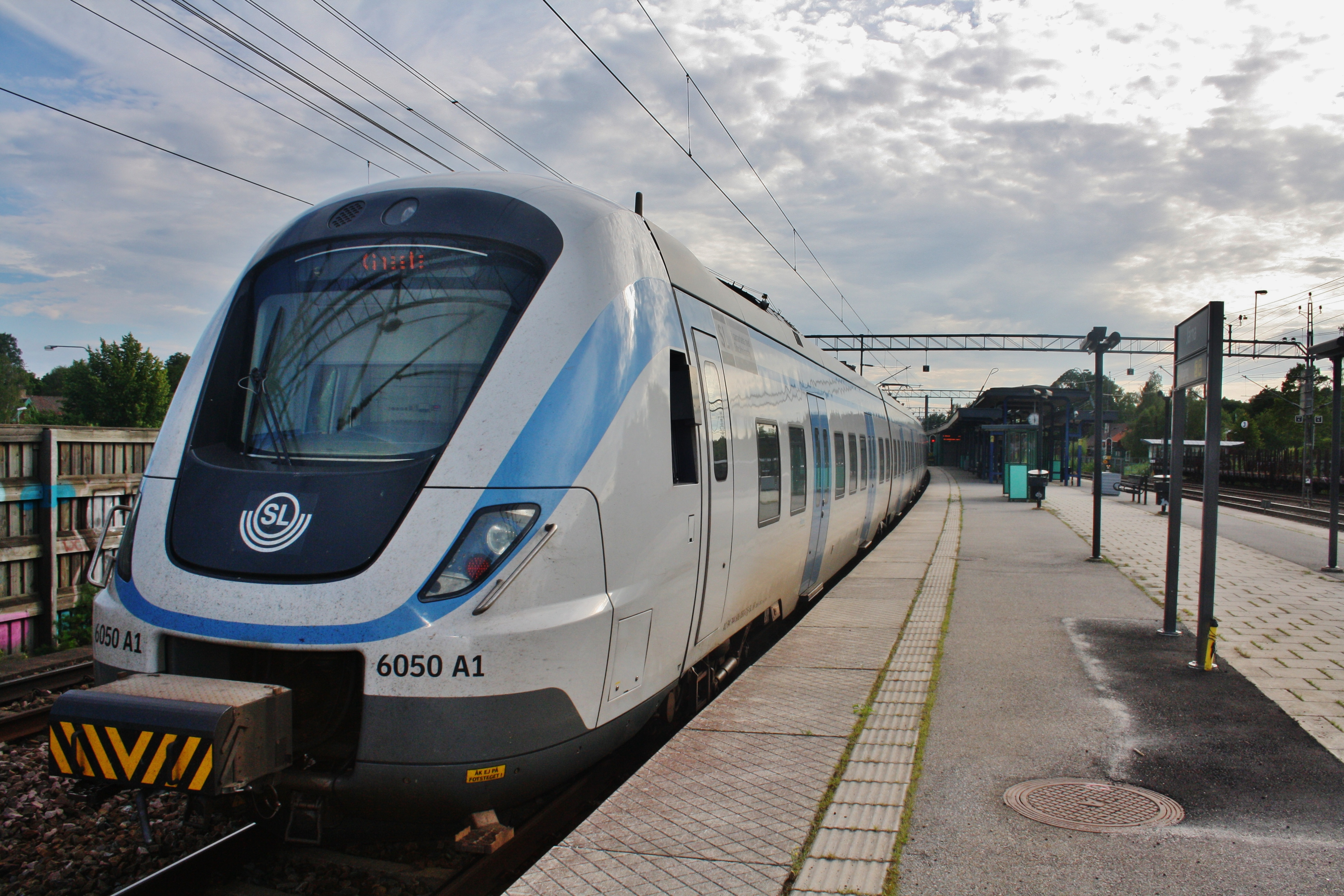
- Järna station

General information
- Location: Järna, Södertälje Municipality, Stockholm County; Sweden
- Coordinates: 59°4′15″N 17°33′52″E
- System: Pendeltåg
- Owner: Swedish Transport Administration
- Line: Western Main Line
- Platforms: 1 Island Platform
- Tracks: 2

Construction
- Structure type: At-grade

Other information
- Station code: Jn

History
- Opened: 1861
- Rebuilt: 1914, 1993 (demolition of old station building)

Passengers
- 2013: 900 boarding per weekday (2013)

Services
Preceding station	Stockholm commuter rail	Following station
Mölnbo towards Gnesta	48	Södertälje Syd towards Södertälje Centrum
Location

Järna is a station on Stockholm's commuter rail network, located in the locality of Järna within Södertälje Municipality on the Western Main Line. The station has a single island platform with a waiting hall, accessible via a pedestrian tunnel under the tracks. As of 2013, the station had approximately 900 boarding passengers per weekday.

== History ==
The station opened in 1861. The first station building, made of wood, was completed in 1862 on the northern side of the railway. Due to increasing traffic, a second station building was opened in 1883 on the southern side, featuring a royal waiting room because Järna was the closest station to the royal palace at Tullgarn. Postal services were also handled at the station, with royal correspondence being dispatched twice daily by courier to and from Tullgarn.

The third and final station building, designed by architect Folke Zettervall, was completed in 1914. It included two royal waiting rooms—one for the king and another for the queen. In 1923, these waiting rooms were converted into a post office after a new royal waiting room was established at Vagnhärad station. The building also housed two signal towers, one located immediately north of the railway bridge and another at the northern end of the railway yard. The station building was demolished in August 1993.

== Gallery ==
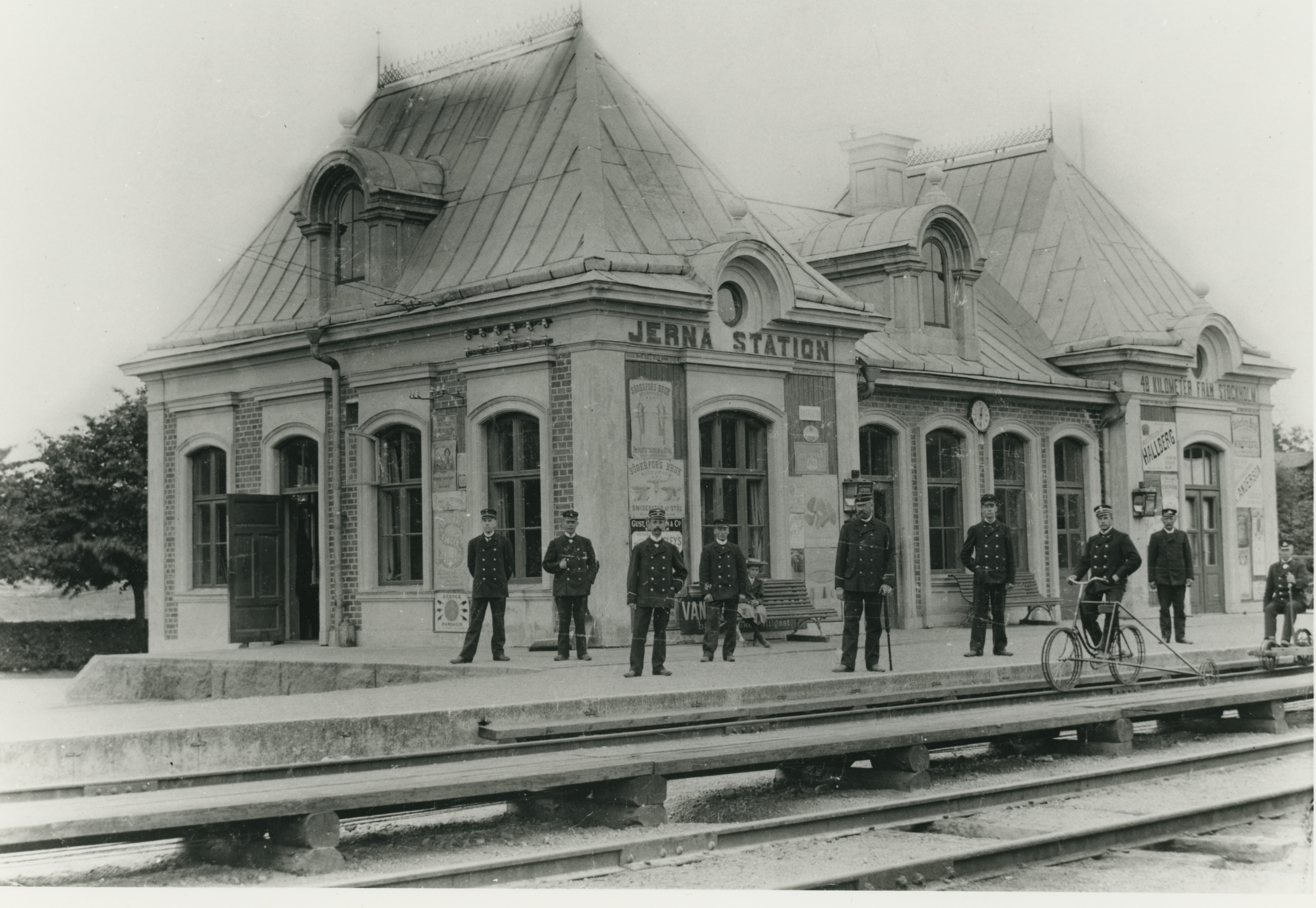
The station during the 1880s, featuring a royal waiting room.

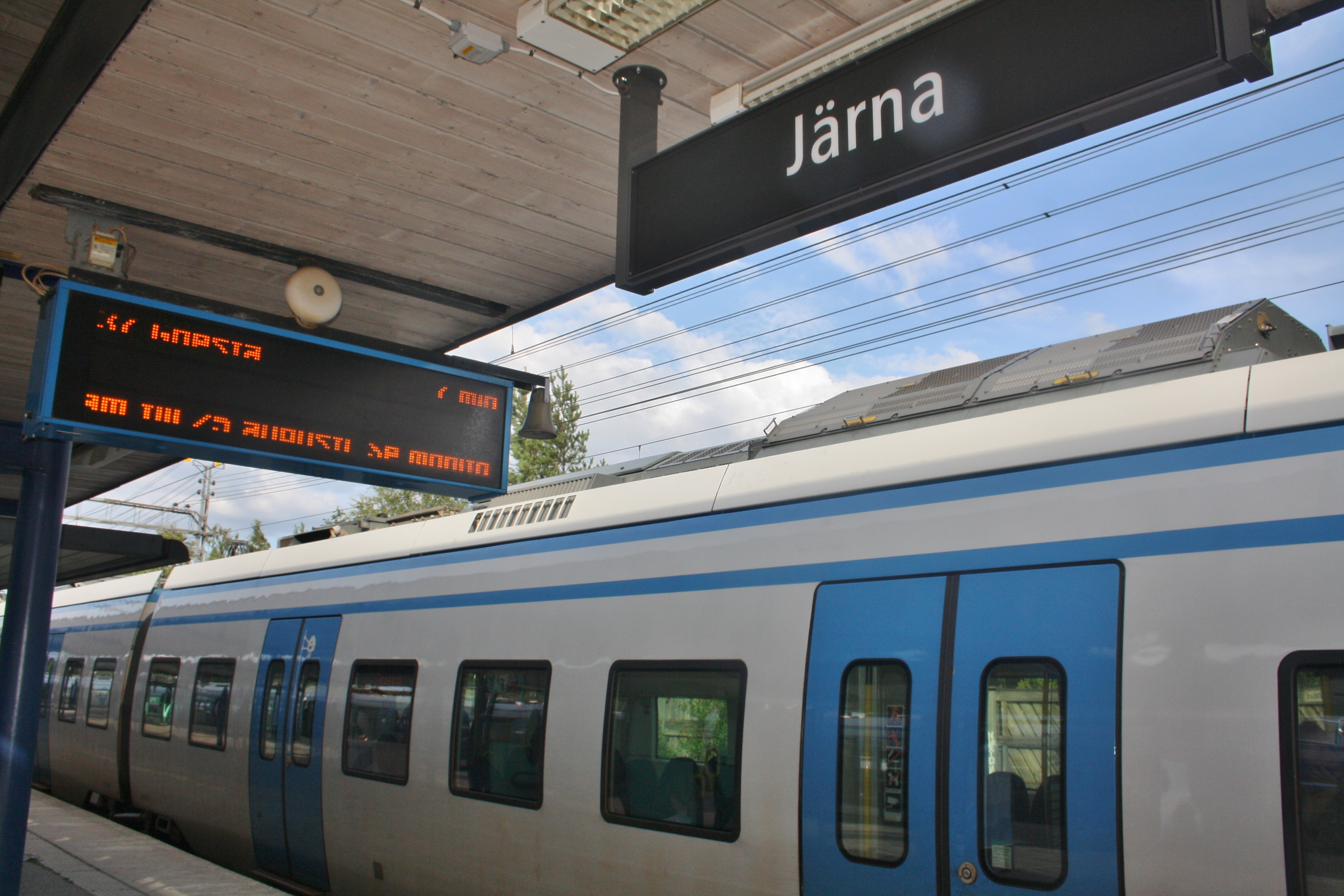
X60 commuter train at Järna

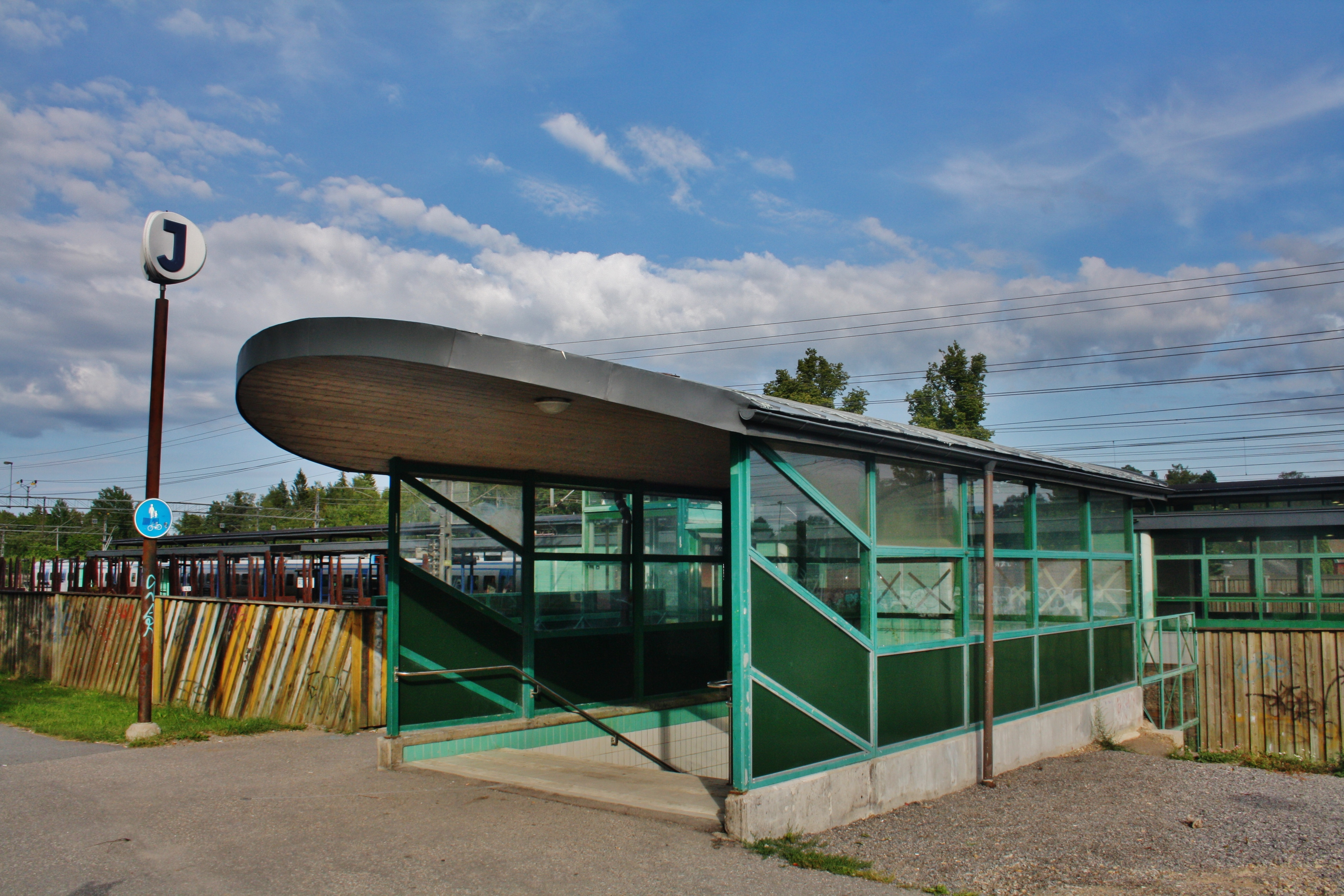
Entrance to the station

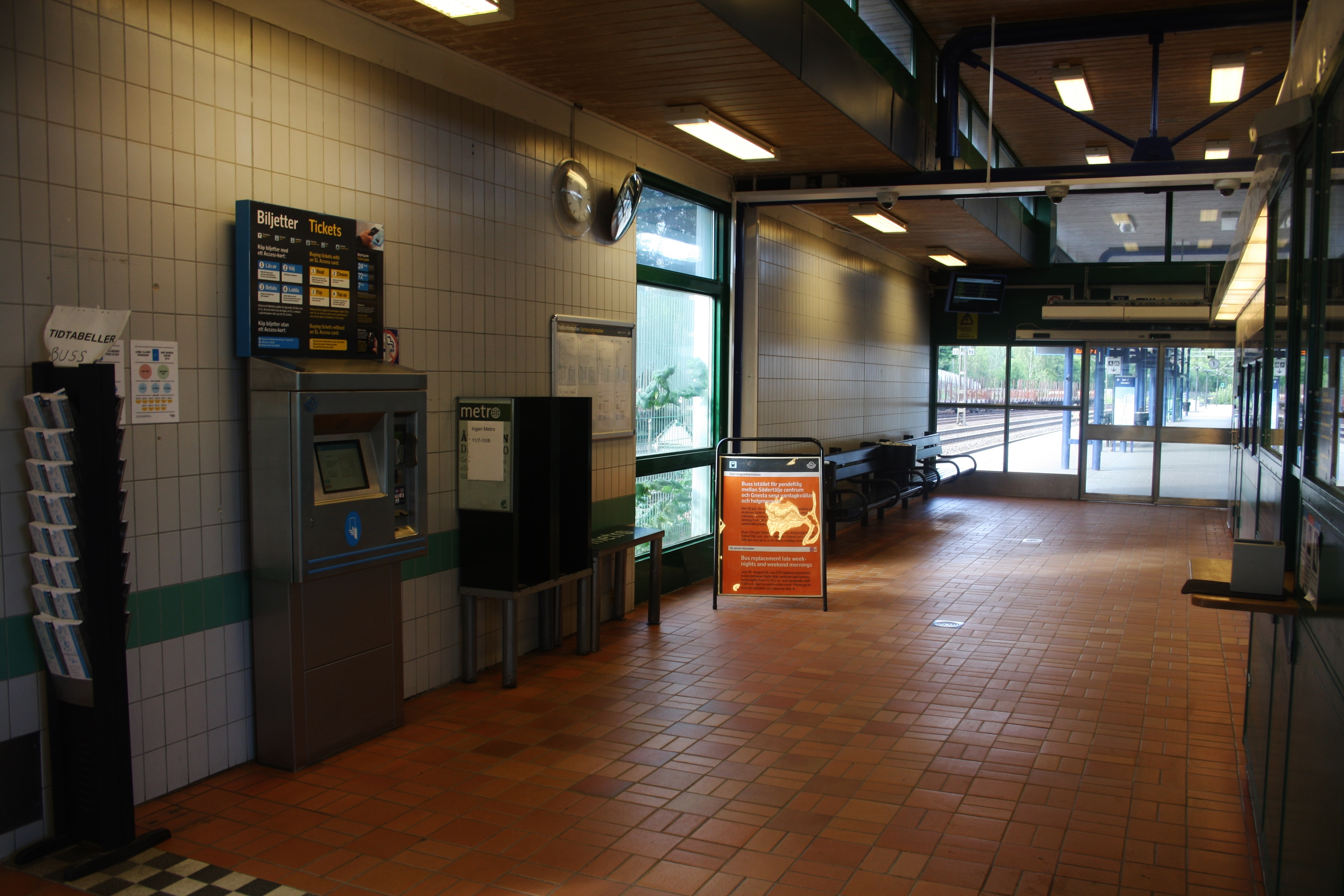
Waiting hall with ticket kiosk

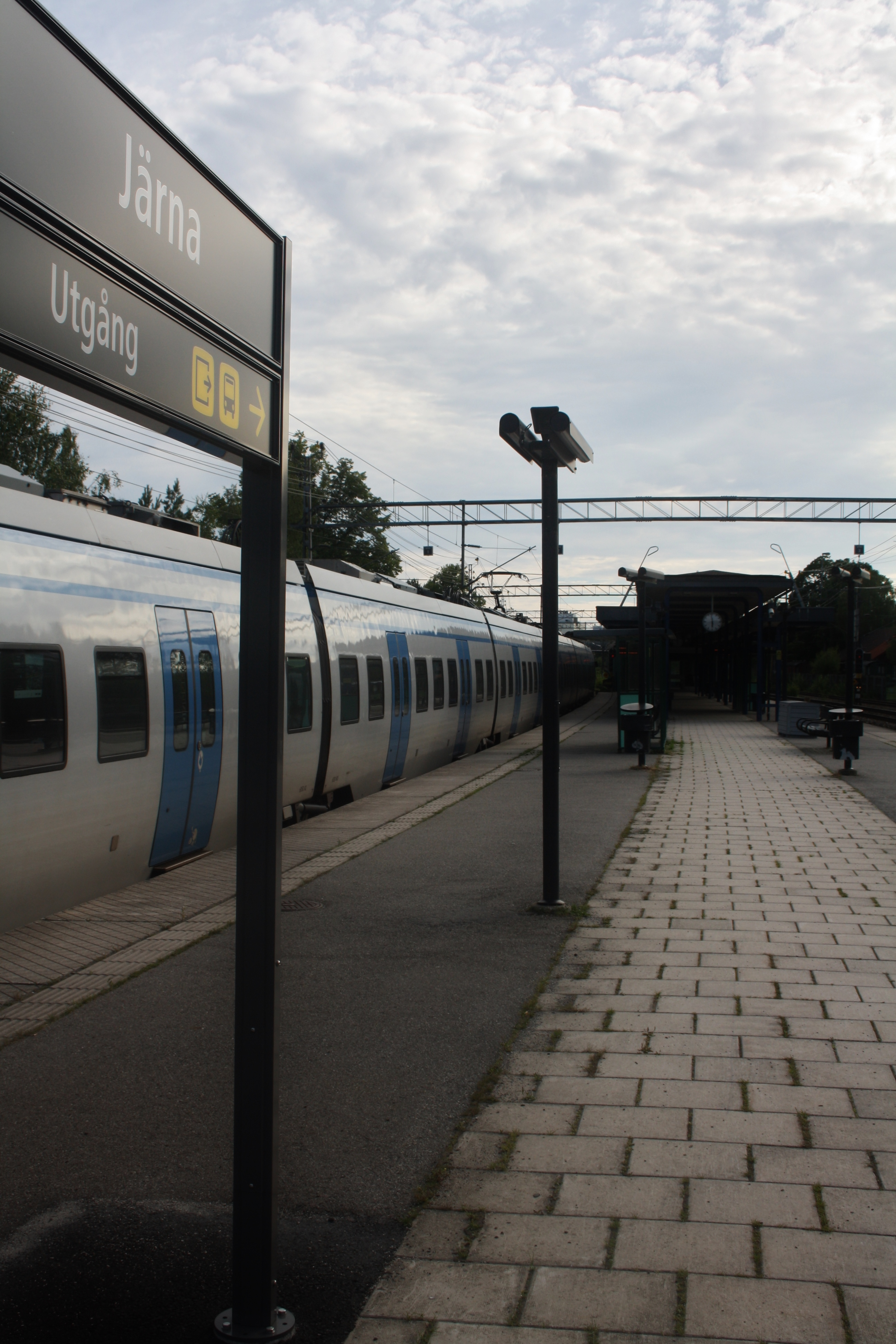
Platform at Järna with an X60 train
