= Tumba railway station =

Railway station in Botkyrka, Sweden

Coordinates: 59.1997°N 17.8358°E

Tumba
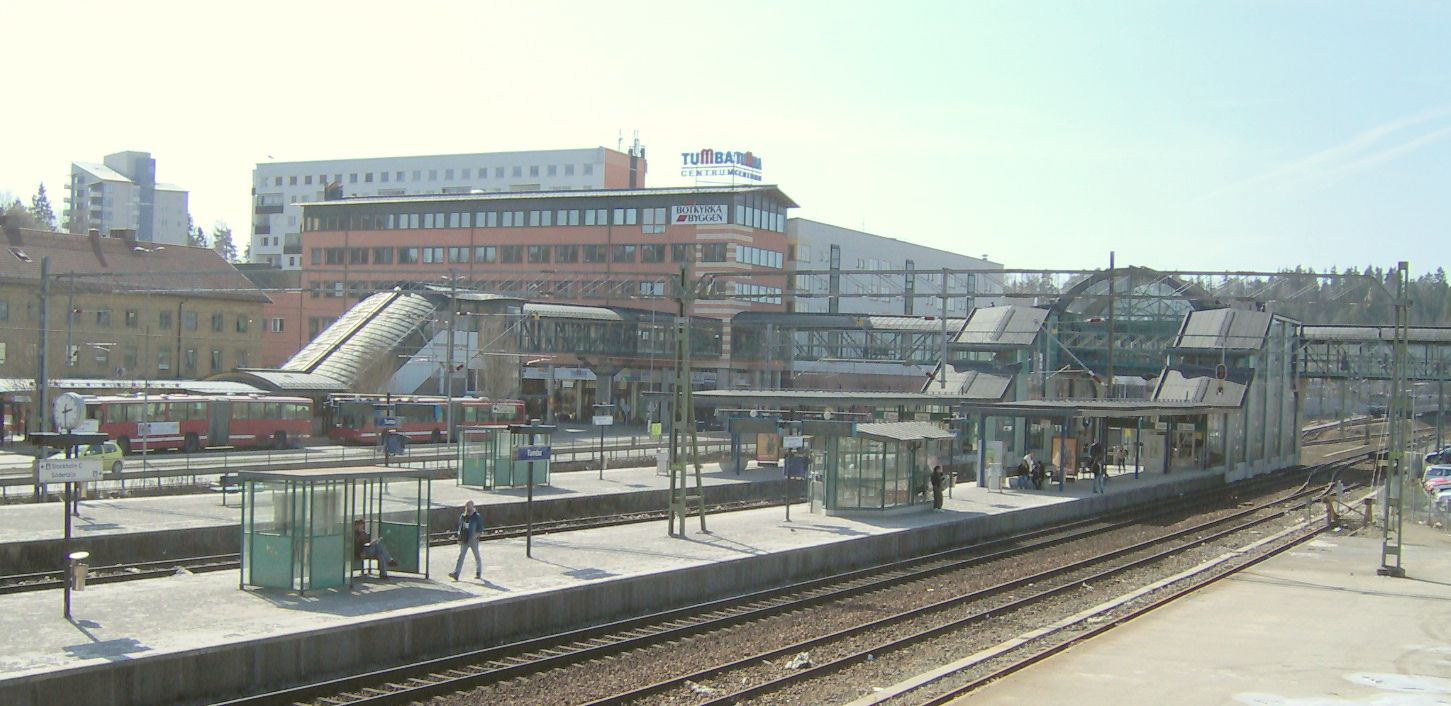

General information
- Location: Tumba, Botkyrka Municipality; Sweden
- System: Stockholm commuter rail
- Platforms: 2

Passengers
- 2019: 9,500 boarding per weekday

Services
Preceding station	Stockholm commuter rail	Following station
Tullinge towards Uppsala C	40	Rönninge towards Södertälje Centrum
Tullinge towards Märsta	41	Rönninge towards Södertälje Centrum
Tullinge towards Bro	44	Terminus
Location

Tumba is a station on the Stockholm commuter rail in Tumba, Botkyrka Municipality, Sweden, approximately 23 km from Stockholm C, between the stations of Tullinge and Rönninge. The first station here was originally built 1860. The station consists of two platforms with a ticket hall with entrance from a pedestrian bridge and was introduced in its present form in the year 1994. In 2019, the number of passengers boarding on an average weekday was estimated at 9,500.

In 1982 the station was the filming location for the ABBA video for their song The Day Before You Came.
