= Södertälje syd railway station =

Railway station in Södertälje, Sweden

Södertälje syd
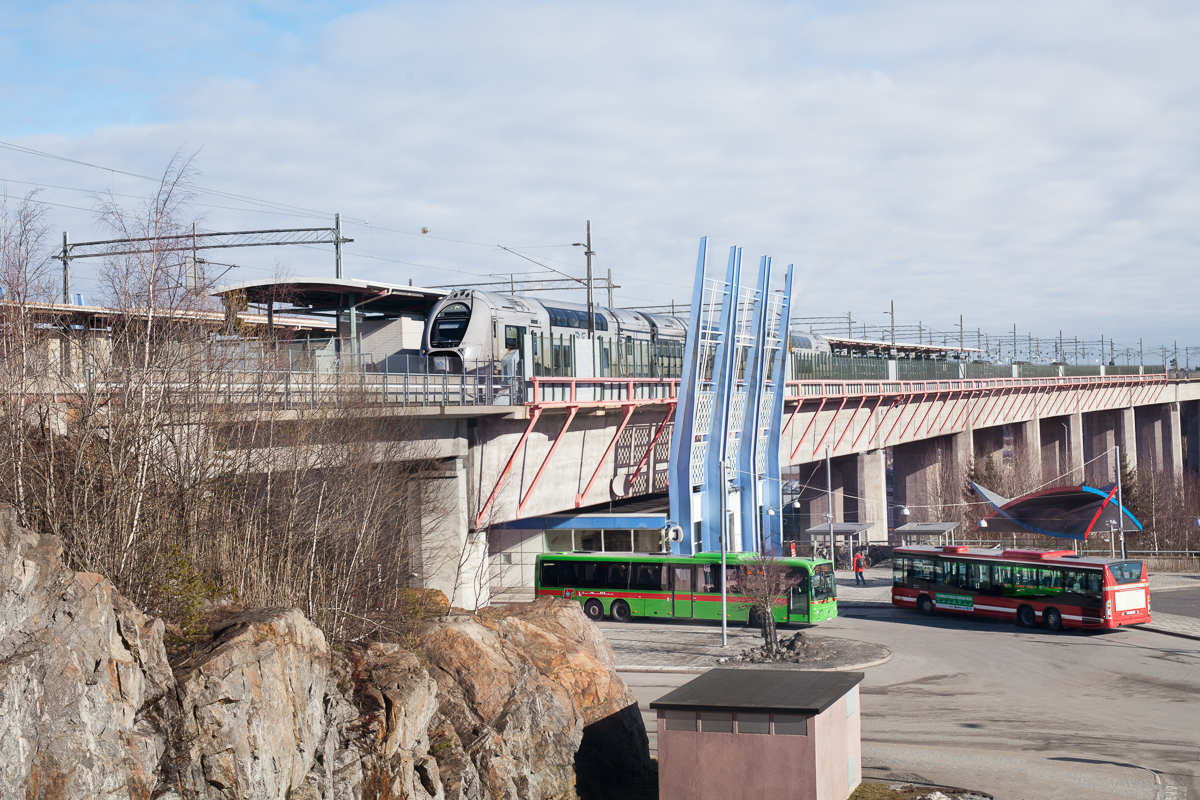
- Södertälje syd övre railway station

General information
- Location: Sydgatan 1, 151 38; Södertälje, Sweden
- Coordinates: 59°09′45″N 17°38′44″E
- Owner: Jernhusen
- Lines: Svealandsbanan; Västra stambanan
- Platforms: 4 (2 side platforms, 2 island platforms)
- Tracks: 6
- Connections: SL Bus: 754, 777, 784X; Sörmlandstrafiken Bus: 802

Construction
- Structure type: Elevated
- Platform levels: 2
- Parking: Yes
- Accessible: Yes

History
- Opened: 14 January 1995; 31 years ago

Services
Preceding station	SJ	Following station
Stockholm C Terminus	Southern Main Line	Katrineholm C towards Köpenhamn H
Stockholm C Terminus	Värmland Line	Katrineholm C towards Oslo
Stockholm C Terminus	Western Main Line	Katrineholm C towards Göteborg C
Preceding station	Long distance trains	Following station
Flemingsberg towards Stockholm C	VR	Katrineholm C towards Göteborg C
Stockholm C Terminus	Snälltåget	Norrköping C towards Malmö Central
Stockholm C Terminus	Snälltåget seasonal	Norrköping C towards Berlin Hbf
Preceding station	Regional trains	Following station
Flemingsberg towards Uppsala C	Mälartåg	Nykvarn towards Örebro C
Flemingsberg towards Stockholm C	Mälartåg	Gnesta towards Hallsberg
Flemingsberg towards Stockholm C	Mälartåg	Vagnhärad towards Norrköping C
Location

Södertälje syd (Södertälje south) is a railway station in Södertälje Municipality, Sweden, located around 3.7 km from central Södertälje. It consists of two separate stations: an upper-level station Södertälje syd övre (Södertälje south upper) for regional and intercity trains and a lower-level station Södertälje syd undre (Södertälje south lower) for Stockholm's commuter trains. The upper station is located on the 2-km-long Igelsta Bridge, while the commuter rail station is at ground level beneath it.

Regional and intercity trains operated by SJ, Mälartåg, Snälltåget, and VR stop at the station, with routes connecting cities such as Stockholm, Gothenburg, Malmö, Copenhagen, Oslo, Linköping, and Eskilstuna.

The Stockholm commuter rail service to central Södertälje primarily operates from Södertälje centrum station, which has significantly higher passenger numbers. The commuter train service to Gnesta also stops at Södertälje syd (lower) but has a relatively low frequency. In 2019, only 300 passengers per weekday boarded commuter rail services at Södertälje syd, making it the third-least-used commuter rail station in Stockholm County, ahead of only Hemfosa and Krigslida on the Nynäs Line. However, a considerably higher number of passengers use the station for regional and intercity travel.

== History ==
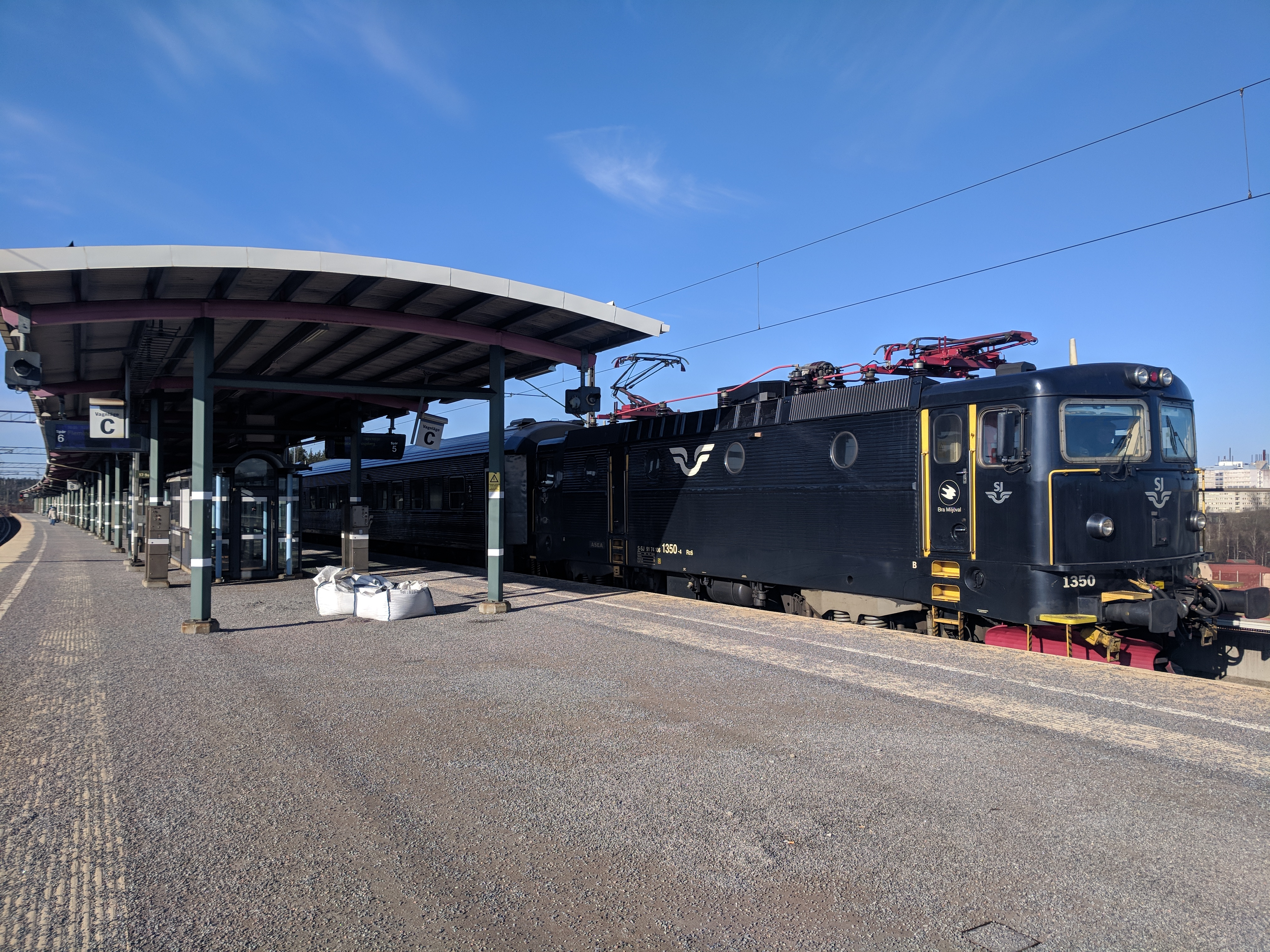
SJ train at Södertälje syd övre

The current Södertälje syd railway station was inaugurated in 1995 along with the Igelsta Bridge as part of the Grödingebanan rail project, a 31-kilometer-long double-track railway between Järna and Flemingsberg.

Due to the hilly terrain and the presence of the busy Södertälje Canal, railway development through Södertälje has been challenging. Grödingebanan was built to shorten travel times compared to the old, winding route, which could be handed over for exclusive use by commuter trains. At the time of its opening, it was Sweden's first example of a modern railway, featuring numerous tunnels, deep rock cuttings, and high viaducts. As part of this modernisation, stations were relocated farther from city centers, with Södertälje syd being a prime example, replacing Södertälje södra (renamed Södertälje hamn in 1994) as the main station for long-distance and regional trains.

== Facilities ==
The station has a central waiting hall located between the upper and lower stations, with escalators and elevators providing access. Parking and bicycle facilities are available, and the station is fully accessible for passengers with disabilities.

== Commuter rail station ==
Södertälje syd
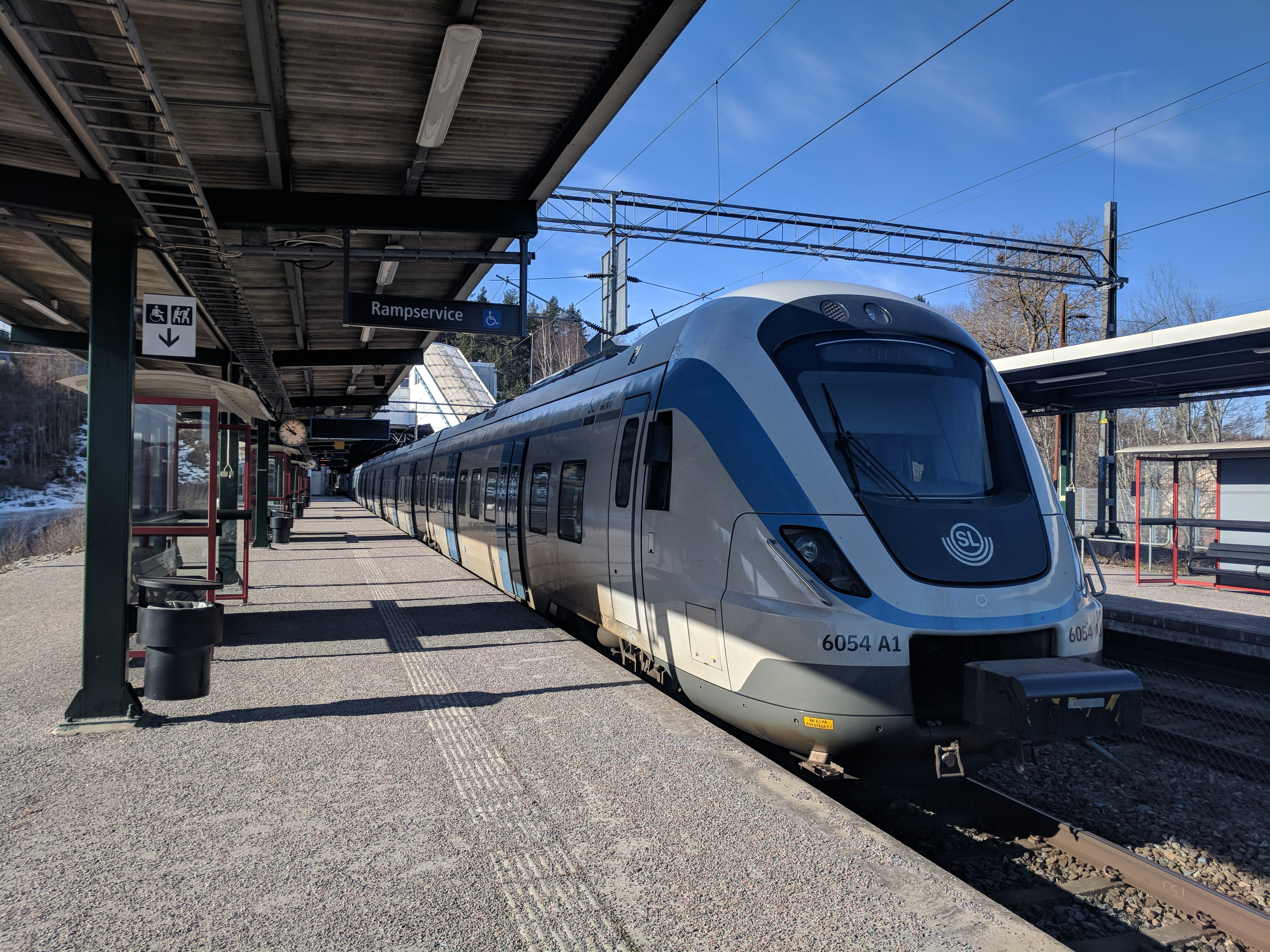
- Södertälje syd undre railway station

General information
- System: SL commuter rail station
- Owner: Jernhusen
- Line: Västra stambanan
- Platforms: 2 side platforms
- Tracks: 2

Construction
- Structure type: At-grade
- Accessible: Yes

History
- Opened: 14 January 1995
- Electrified: 15 kV AC

Passengers
- 2019: 300 Average daily ridership

Services
Preceding station	Stockholm commuter rail	Following station
Järna towards Gnesta	48	Södertälje hamn towards Södertälje centrum
Location

Södertälje syd (formally the Södertälje syd undre operating area) is a station on the Stockholm commuter rail network. It is located on the ''lillpendeln'' Södertälje–Gnesta line, 3.2 km from Södertälje centrum and 14 m above sea level, thus 23 m below the long-distance train station. The station has two tracks and two side platforms with an entrance from the southern part. The waiting hall is shared with the upper station. The number of boarding passengers on an average winter weekday is estimated to be approximately 200 (2015).

== Public transport links ==
- Stockholm commuter rail
- Several bus lines

== See also ==
- Södertälje hamn, the former major train terminal of Södertälje
- List of railway stations in Sweden
- Transport in Stockholm
- SJ AB
- Stockholm commuter rail
