= Tullinge railway station =

Railway station in Botkyrka, Sweden

Coordinates: 59.2053°N 17.9036°E

Tullinge
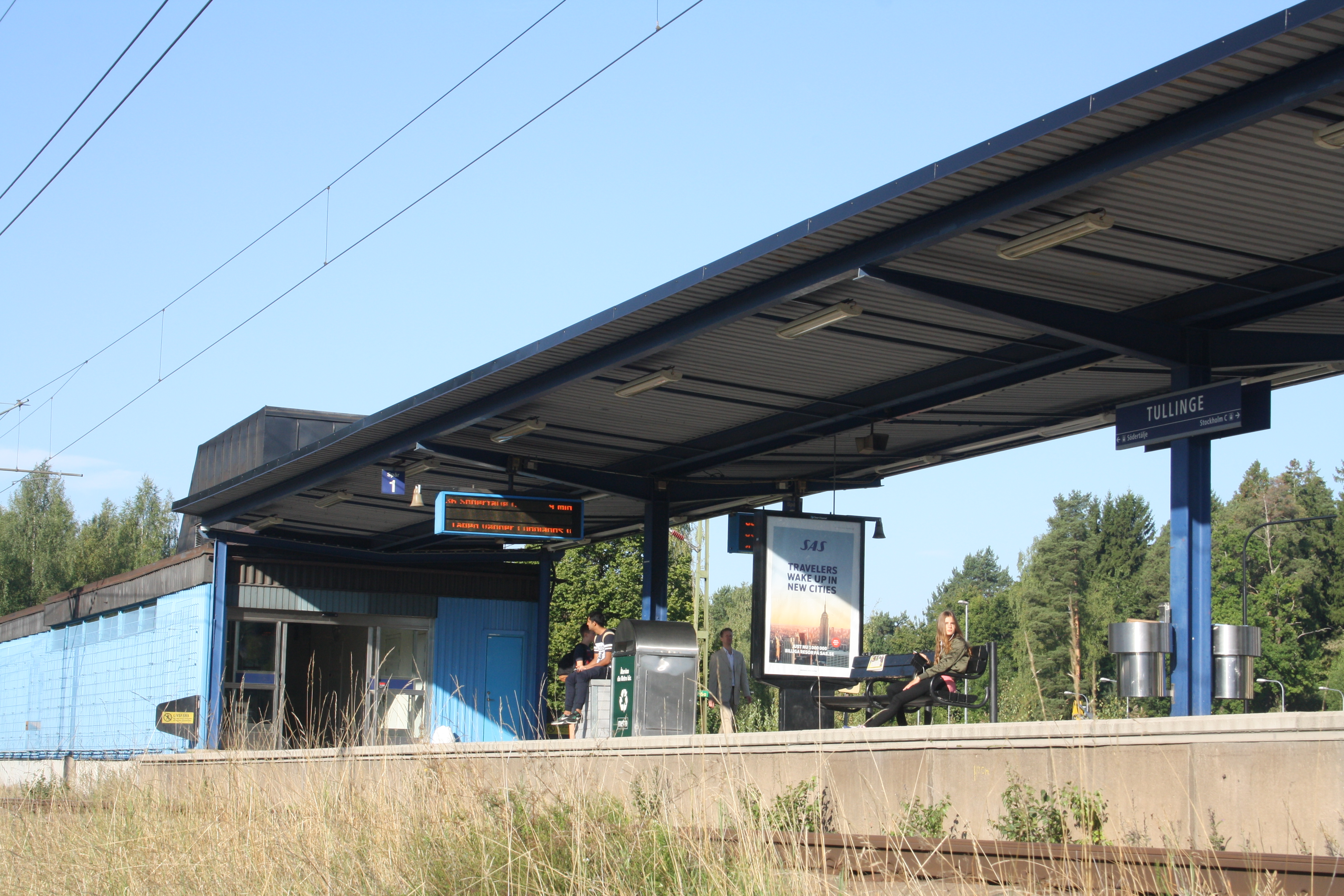
- Tullinge railway station in August 2016.

General information
- Location: Tullinge, Botkyrka Municipality; Sweden
- Platforms: 1

History
- Opened: 1969

Passengers
- 2019: 5,600 boarding per weekday

Services
Preceding station	Stockholm commuter rail	Following station
Flemingsberg towards Uppsala C	40	Tumba towards Södertälje Centrum
Flemingsberg towards Märsta	41	Tumba towards Södertälje Centrum
Flemingsberg towards Bro	44	Tumba Terminus
Location

Tullinge is a station on the Stockholm commuter rail in Stockholm, near Södertälje, located in the center of the area Tullinge, approximately 19 km from Stockholm C, between the stations of Tumba and Flemingsberg. The station has a central platform with ticket hall on the platform and the entrance of a subway. It opened on 1 June 1969. In 2019, it had approximately 5,600 boarding passengers per day.
