= Flemingsberg railway station =

Railway station in Huddinge, Sweden

Flemingsberg
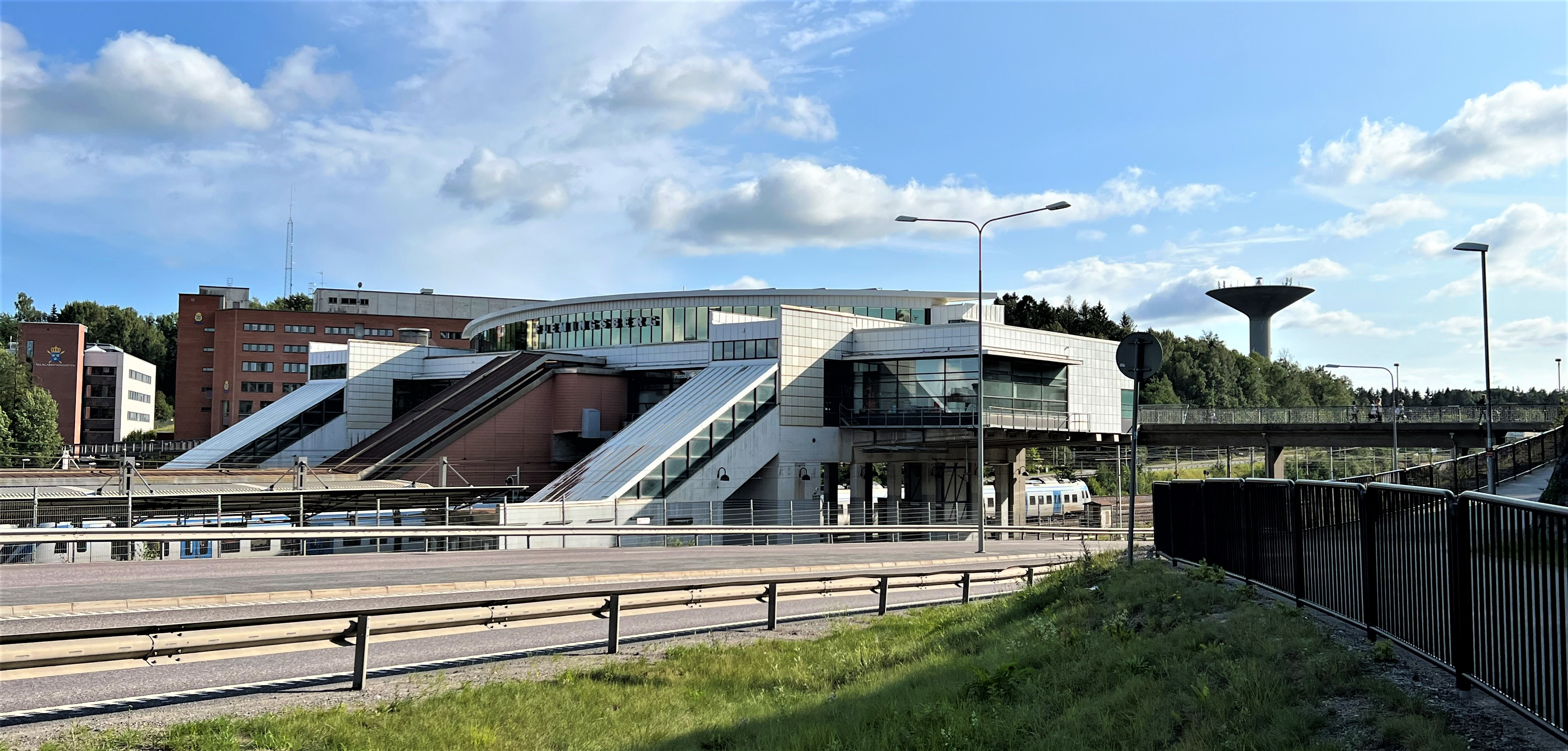
- Flemingsberg station

General information
- Location: Björnkullavägen 2; 141 51 Huddinge; Sweden
- Coordinates: 59°13′1″N 17°56′42″E
- Owner: Jernhusen (station infrastructure); Trafikverket (rail infrastructure)
- Line: Järna-Stockholm
- Platforms: 3
- Tracks: 6

History
- Opened: 1987; 39 years ago

Services
| Preceding station | Stockholm commuter rail | Following station |
|---|---|---|
| Huddinge towards Uppsala C | 40 | Tullinge towards Södertälje Centrum |
| Huddinge towards Märsta | 41 | Tullinge towards Södertälje Centrum |
| Preceding station | SJ | Following station |
| Stockholm C towards Gävle C | Gävle–Linköping | Södertälje Syd towards Linköping C |
| Preceding station | Long distance trains | Following station |
| Stockholm C Terminus | VR | Södertälje Syd towards Göteborg C |
| Preceding station | Regional trains | Following station |
| Stockholm C towards Uppsala C | Mälartåg | Södertälje Syd towards Örebro C |
| Stockholm C Terminus | Mälartåg | Södertälje Syd towards Hallsberg |
| Stockholm C Terminus | Mälartåg | Södertälje Syd towards Norrköping C |
Location

Flemingsberg is a railway station in Flemingsberg in Huddinge Municipality, Stockholm. Located approximately 19 km south of Stockholm Central Station, it serves as a transport hub for Stockholm commuter rail, InterCity, and Regional train services.

The station has three island platforms, with both commuter and long-distance trains. The adjacent bus terminal offers multiple regional and local connections. Flemingsberg is also a key station for passengers traveling between southern Stockholm and southern Sweden.

== History ==
Flemingsberg station was inaugurated in 1987 as part of the Stockholm commuter rail expansion. In 1990, it was upgraded to also accommodate long-distance trains, and for a period it was named Stockholm Syd–Flemingsberg. The name reverted to Flemingsberg in 2001.

During 2014-2018, the station underwent extensive renovations as part of a broader infrastructure improvement project. The upgrade included a new platform, improved accessibility, and additional tracks to accommodate increased train traffic.

== Services ==
Flemingsberg station provides both commuter and long-distance train services:

- Stockholm commuter rail – Travel time to Stockholm City railway station is approximately 18 minutes. The station also offers connections to Uppsala, Arlanda, and Södertälje.
- Regional trains – Operated by Mälartåg, with connections to Eskilstuna, Västerås, and other cities.
- InterCity and high-speed services – Operated by SJ and VR Snabbtåg Sverige, providing long-distance travel across Sweden.

== Gallery ==
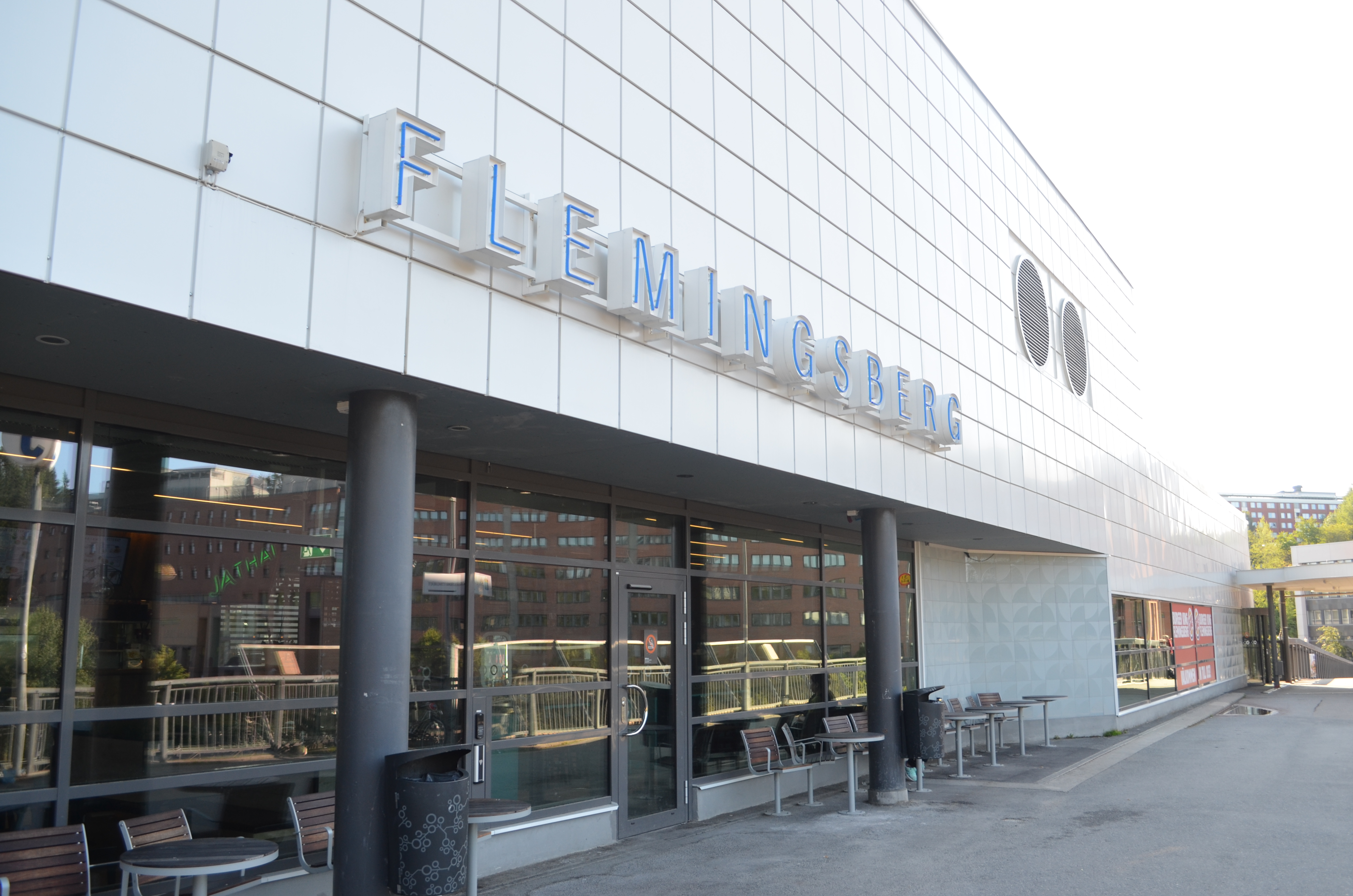
Station entrance

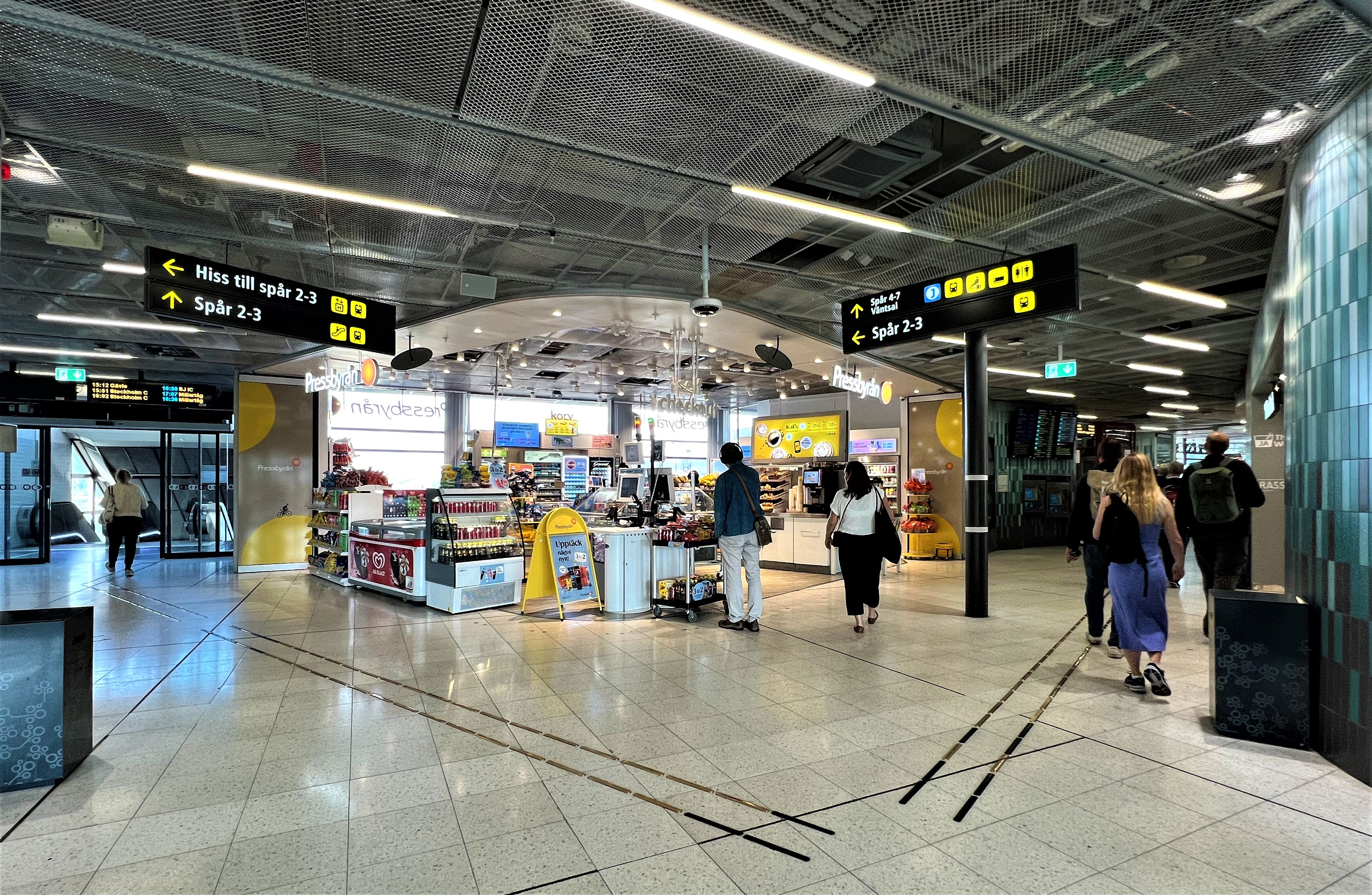
Interior

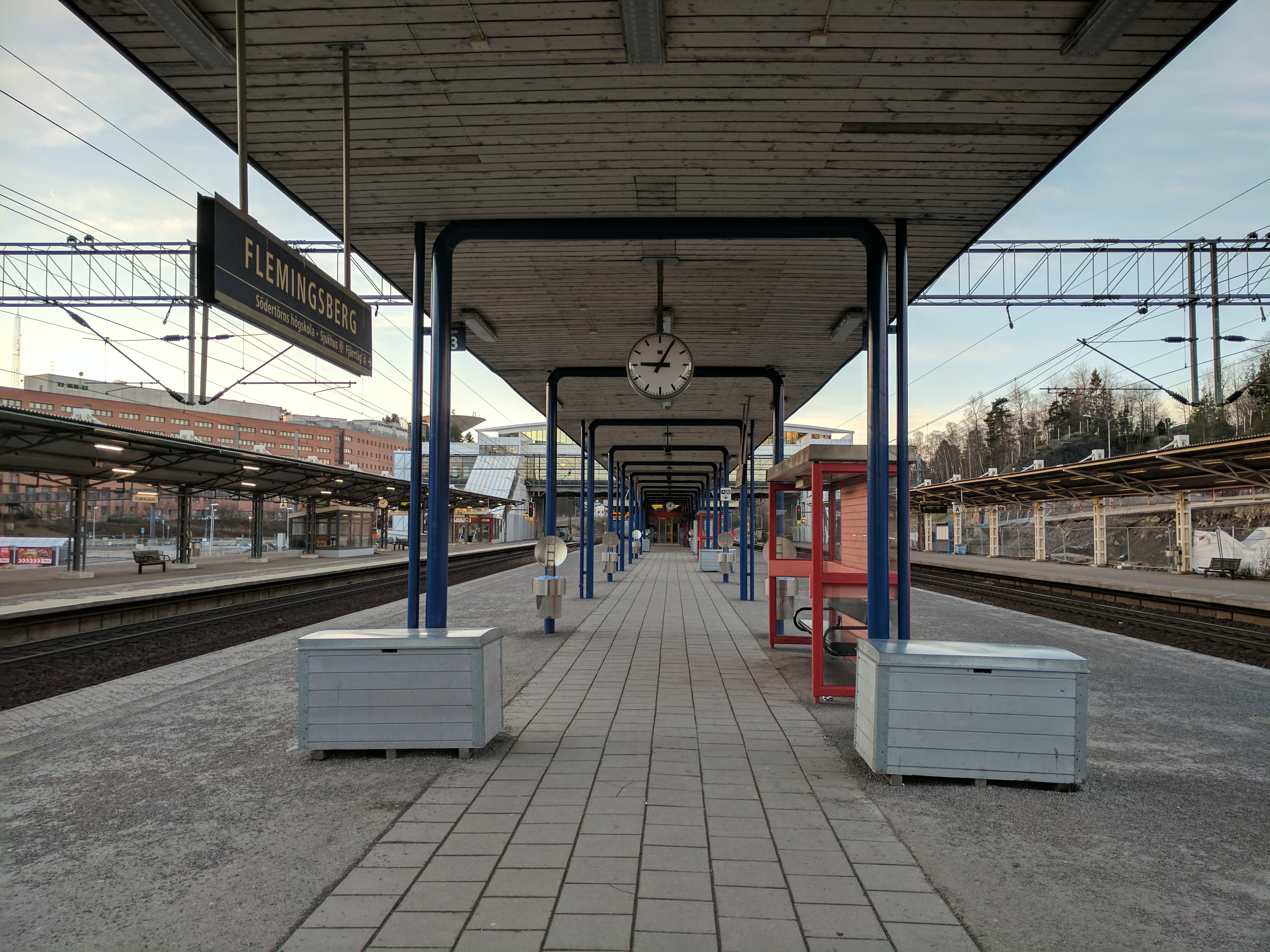
Commuter rail platform

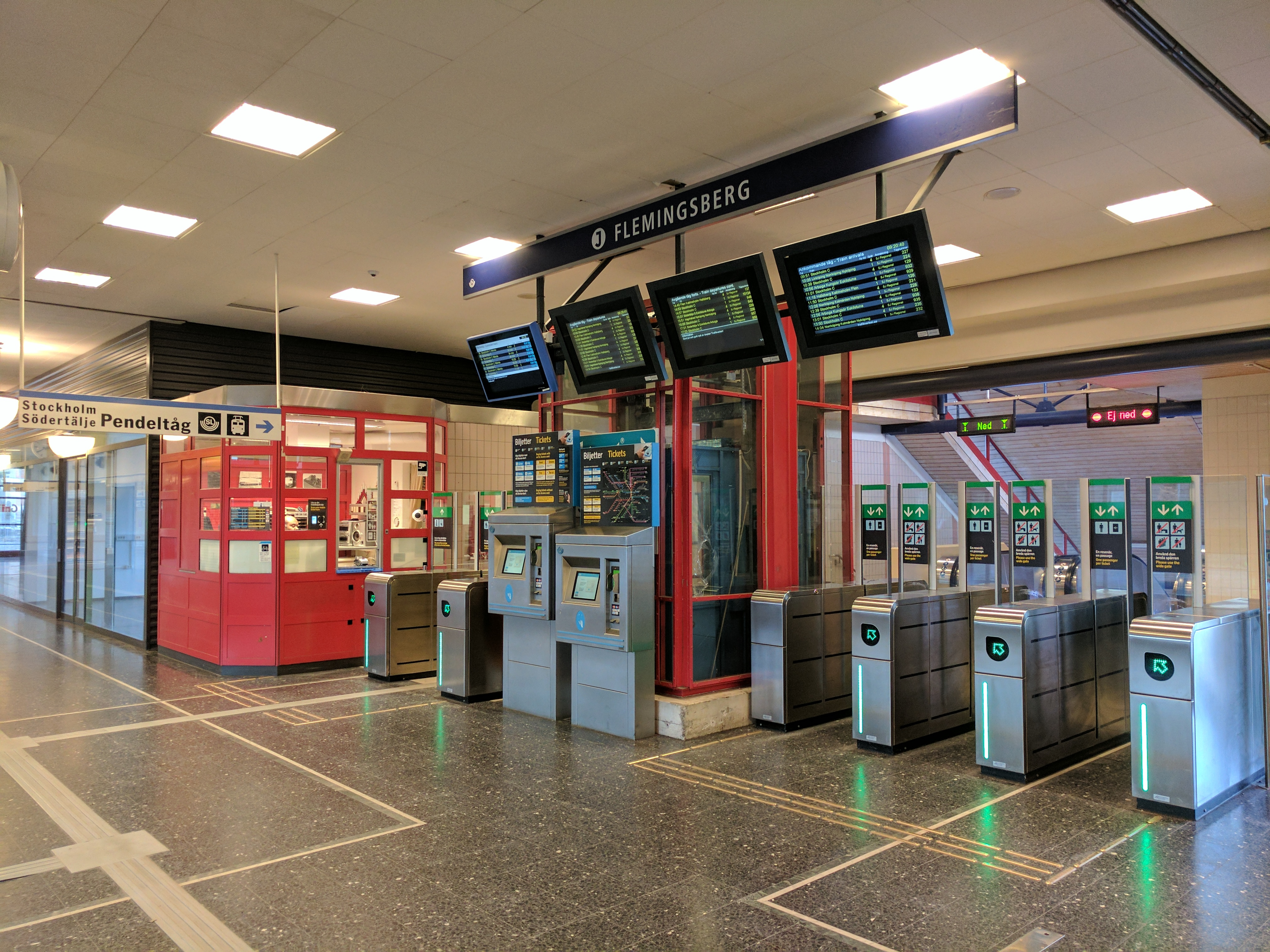
Ticket gates

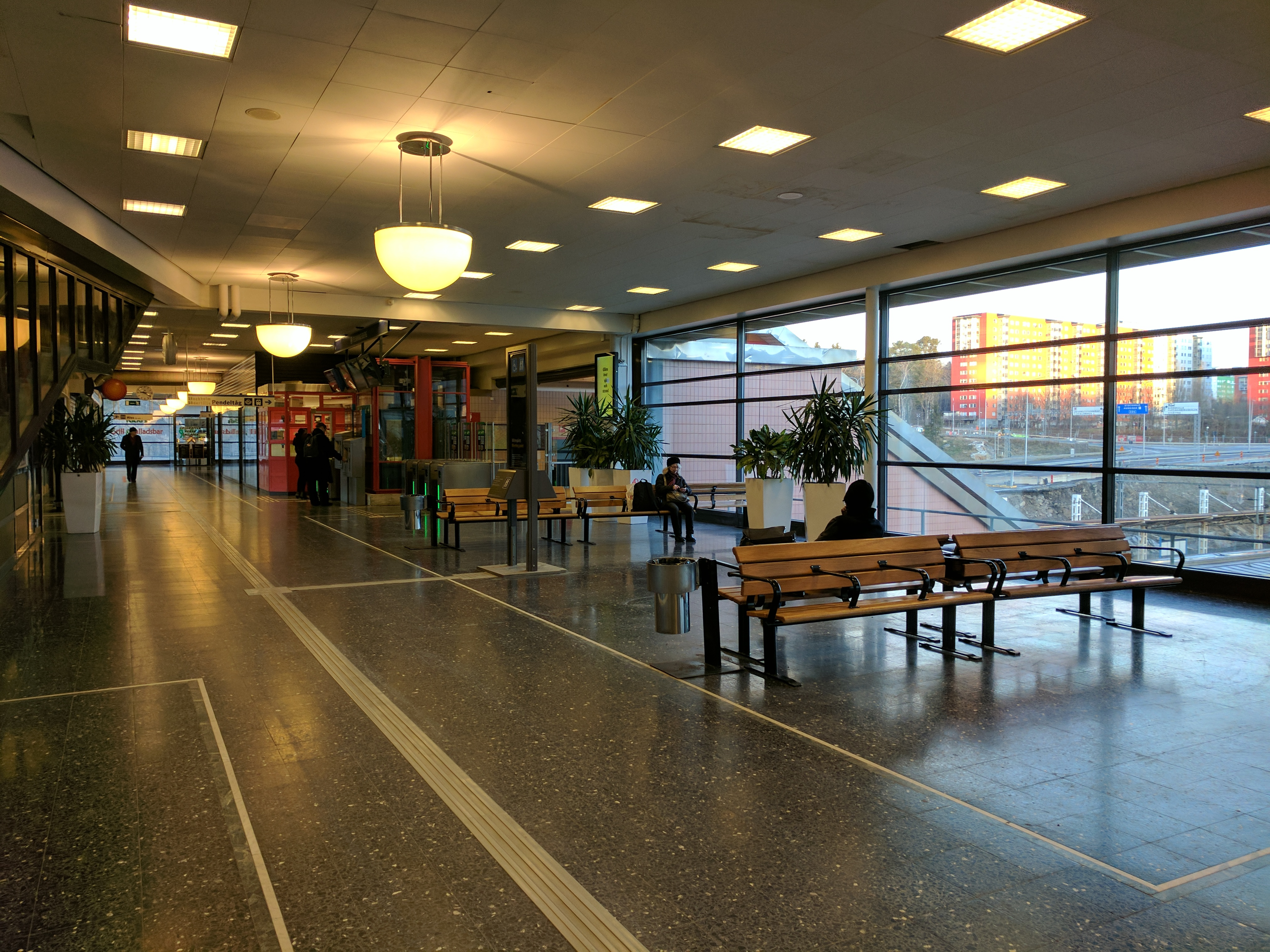
Waiting hall

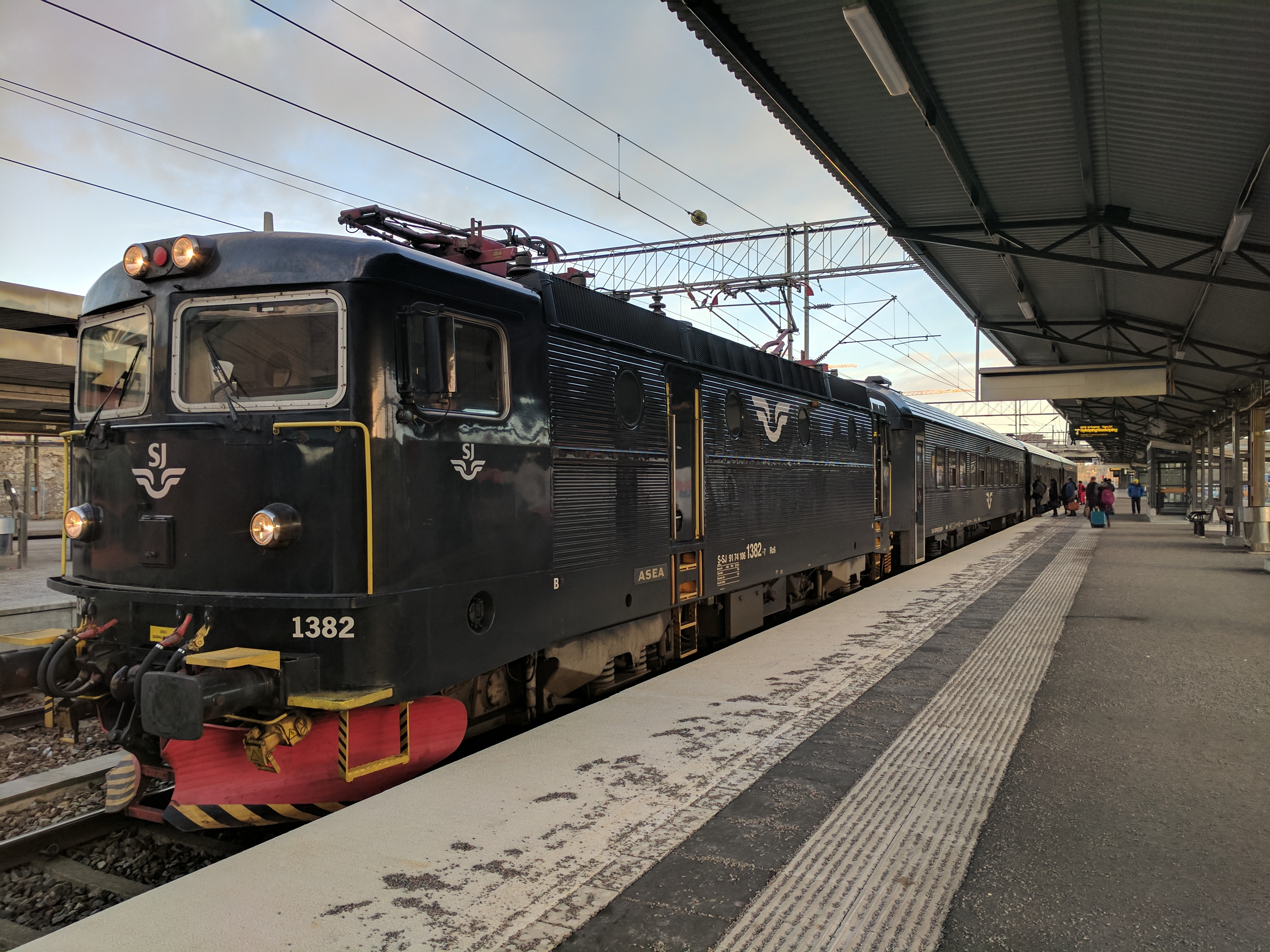
InterCity train at the station

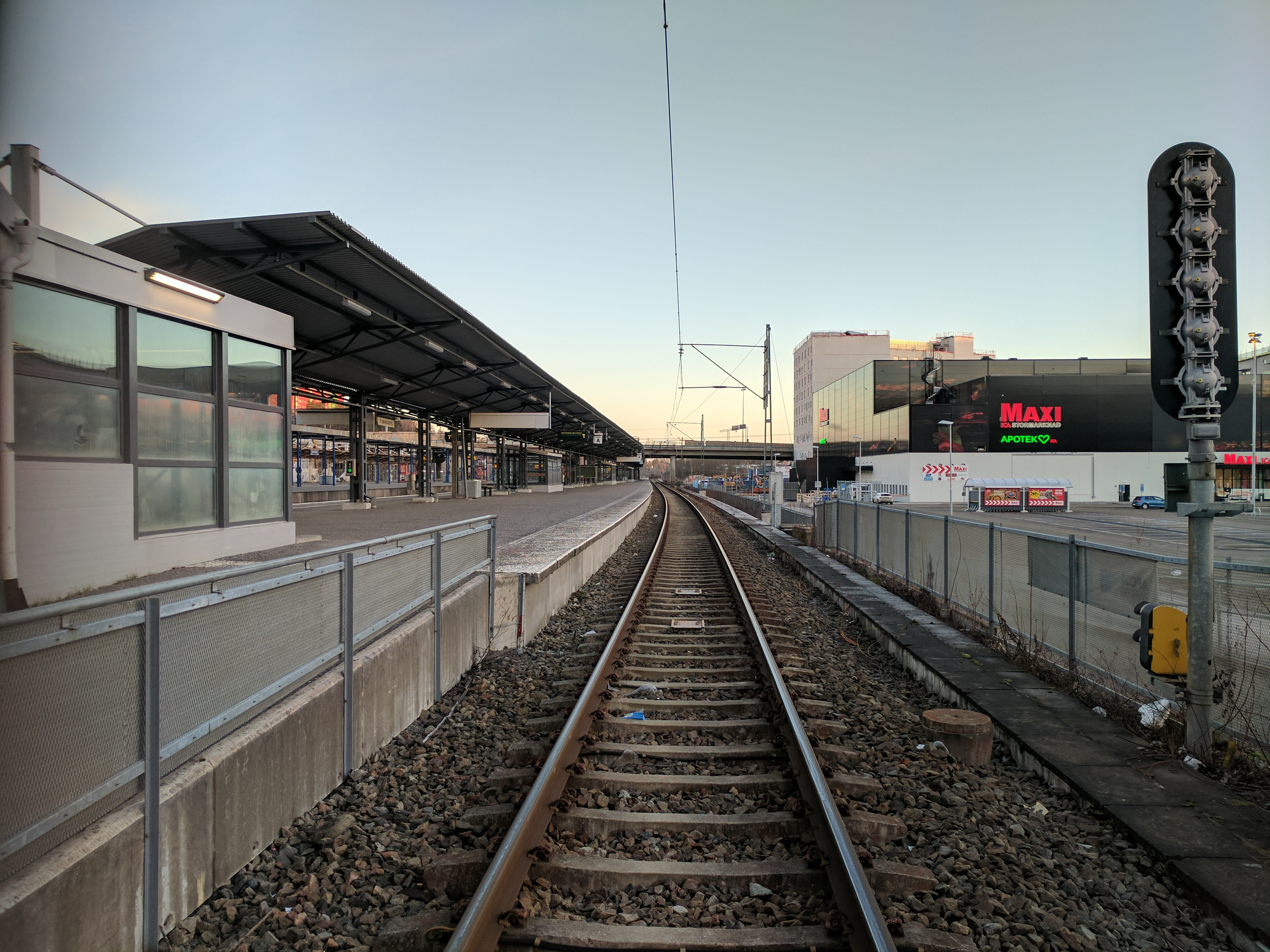
Track 7
