= Igelsta Bridge =

- Coordinates: 59°10′03″N 17°40′01″E
- Carries: Västra Stambanan
- Crosses: Södertälje Canal/Igelsta Bay
- Locale: Södertälje Municipality, Sweden
- Maintained by: Swedish National Rail Administration

Characteristics
- Total length: 2140 m (7020 ft)
- Width: 2 rail tracks. In the westernmost part, 4 rail tracks and passenger platforms.
- Clearance below: 48 m (157 ft)

History
- Opened: 1995

Location
- Interactive map of Igelsta Bridge

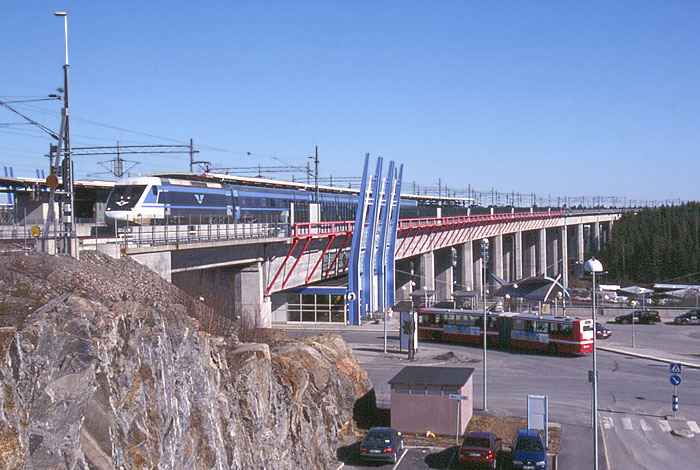
An X2000 train stops at Södertälje syd railway station on the bridge.

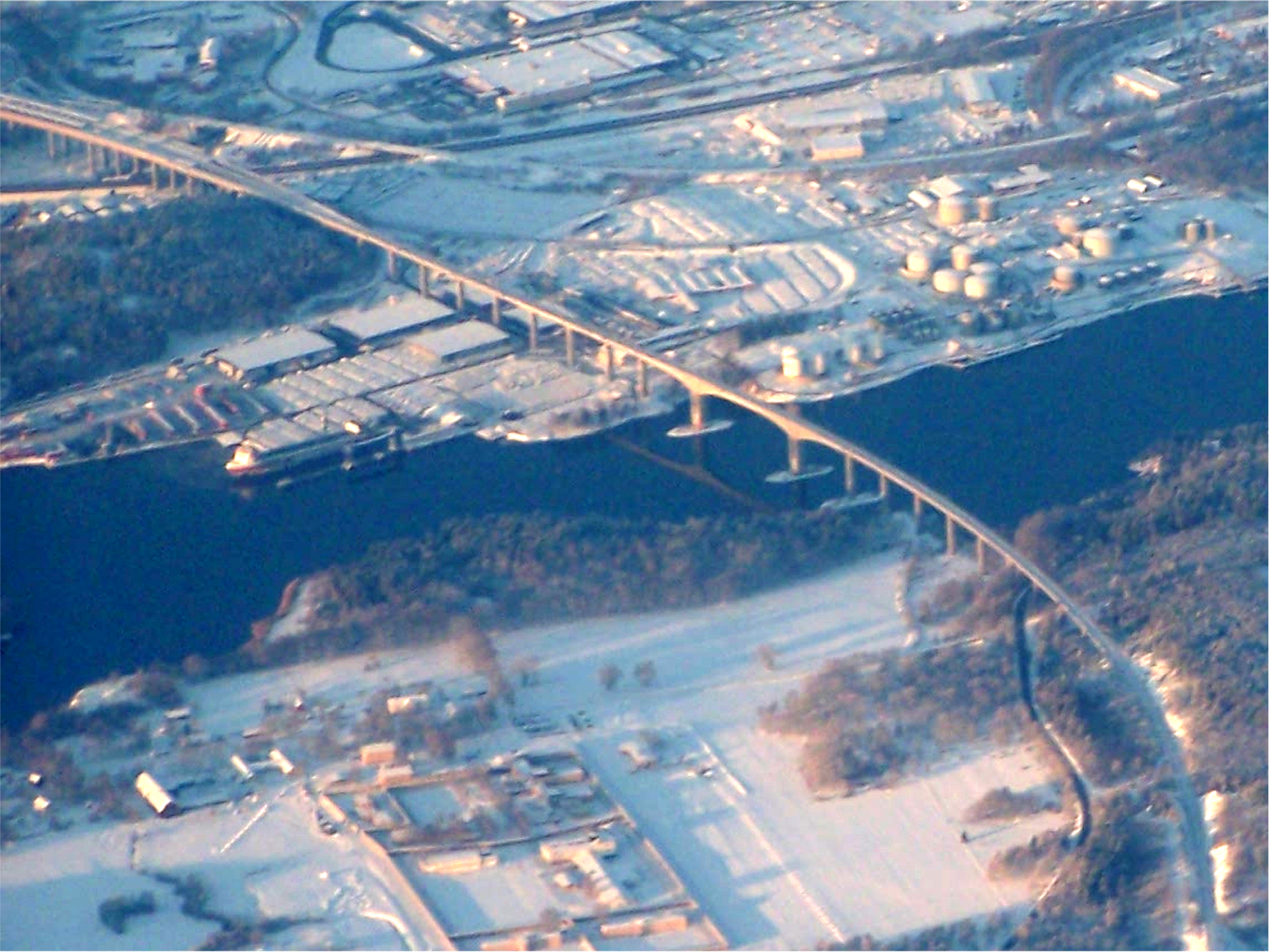
The bridge seen from southeast

The Igelsta Bridge (Swedish: Igelstabron) is a railway bridge in Södertälje, Stockholm County in Sweden. The bridge crosses the Södertälje Canal, and the E4 motorway. The length is 2140 m, and the maximum height is 48 m. It was opened in 1995, and is the longest railway-only bridge in Scandinavia. The Oresund Bridge, the western Great Belt Bridge and the Storstrøm Bridge are longer but have both rail and road.

A railway station, Södertälje syd railway station, is located on the western part of bridge. Escalators are used to reach the tracks. Most high speed trains on the X 2000 service to Gothenburg and Copenhagen and almost all regional trains stop at the station. Local commuter trains stop at the old lower level of the station.
