= Mölnbo =

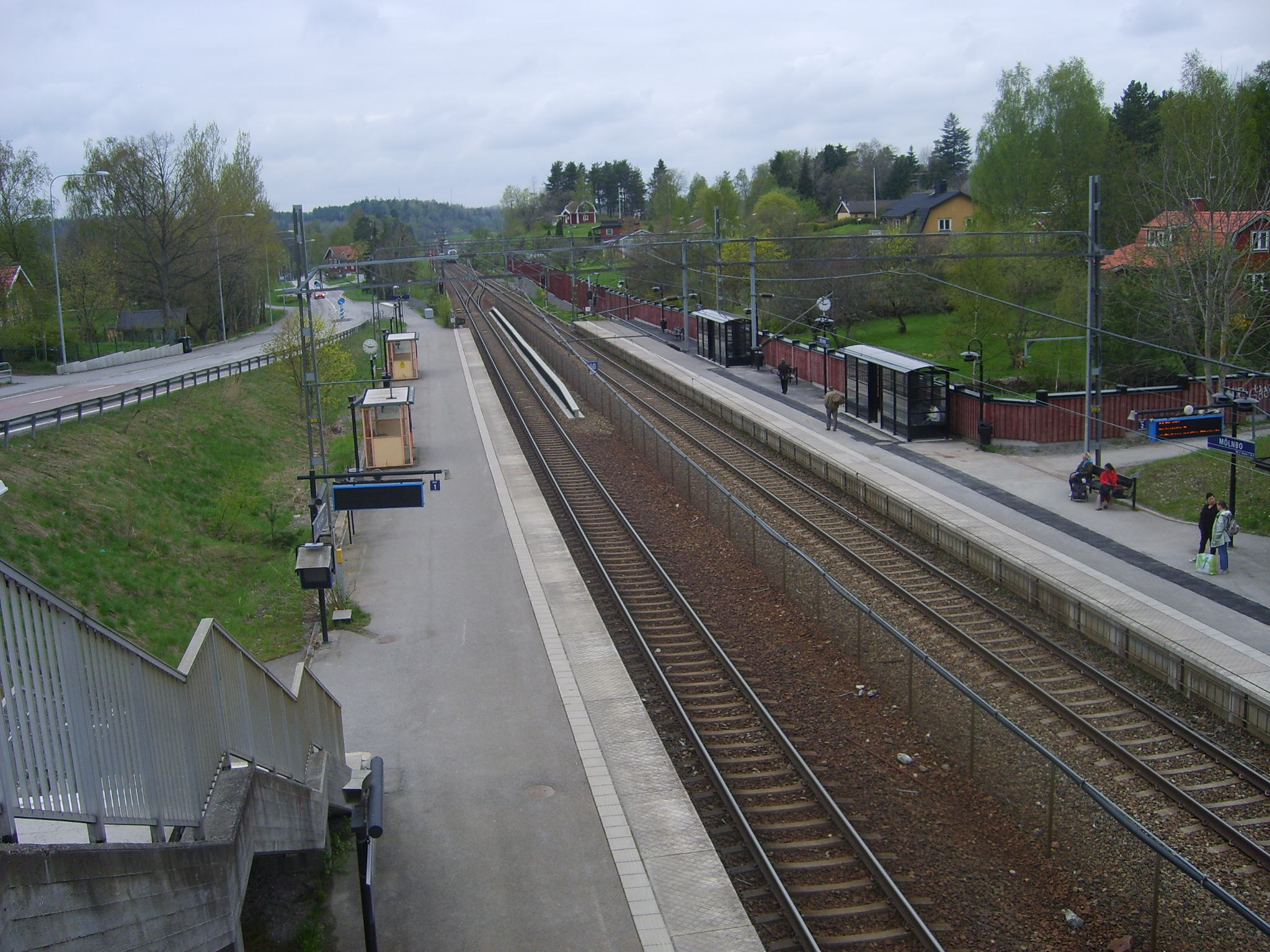
- Train station in Mölnbo

- Location within Stockholm Location within Sweden Location within European Union
- Coordinates: 59°11′N 17°38′E
- Country: Sweden
- Province: Södermanland
- County: Stockholm County
- Municipality: Södertälje Municipality

Area
  - Total: 1.16 km^{2} (0.45 sq mi)

Population (31 December 2020)
  - Total: 1,131
  - Density: 975/km^{2} (2,530/sq mi)
- Time zone: UTC+1 (CET)
  - Summer (DST): UTC+2 (CEST)
- Postal code: 15021
- Website: www.molnbo.se

Mölnbo (Swedish pronunciation: [ˈmœ̌lnbʊ]) is a locality situated in Södertälje Municipality, Stockholm County, Sweden with 1,052 inhabitants in 2010.

== Community & Service ==
The range of services is very limited in Mölnbo. The proximity to Gnesta and Södertälje, as well as the relative proximity to Stockholm is a contributing factor to the limited range of services. Stores tend to open in larger cities instead. Some major chains of stores, for example Konsum (nowadays COOP) have tried to open grocery stores in Mölnbo, but failed to keep open due to the limited population. Today, there is one store in Mölnbo. Mölnbo's greatest era was during the 19th century when the Swedish king had one of his stables close to the village. Celebrities from Mölnbo are the musicians who created the band Fresh 'n' Funky. Mölnbo has a rich variety of different associations like Mölnbo IF (a football club) and Mölnbo GF (gymnastics).

There are a few municipal services in Mölnbo, one of them being a small library.

== Mölnbo filmfestival (Mölnbo film festival) ==
Mölnbo filmfestival is held annually in Mölnbo Bio (Mölnbo cinema). The festival was highly appreciated, and was a pleasure, not only for the citizens in Mölnbo – but also for other people as well. After three successful festivals, there has been a break for some years, however Mölnbo Bio is still alive, and shows a new movie every Sunday. The cinema is located in the oldest, and nowadays only, Folkets Hus in Södertälje.

Those who built the house was a group of radical agricultural labourers and workers at the nearby sawmill and at the marble quarry. This contributed to close relationships with the growing central labour movement. In Mölnbo Folkets Hus, Keve Hjelm had his first musical performance. Other famous citizens from Vårdinge who have performed in Mölnbo Folkets Hus are Tora Dahl and Harry Martinsson.

== Public transport ==
Mölnbo is served by Stockholm commuter rail, the Gnesta–Södertälje Centrum line. Change to long distance trains can be done at Södertälje Syd. An express railway station will also be built in Gnesta, which will simplify commuting to the centre of Södermanland, like for example Katrineholm and Flen. Bus 786 runs the Gnesta–Mölnbo–Järna stretch.
