= Gnesta railway station =

Railway station in Gnesta, Sweden

Gnesta station
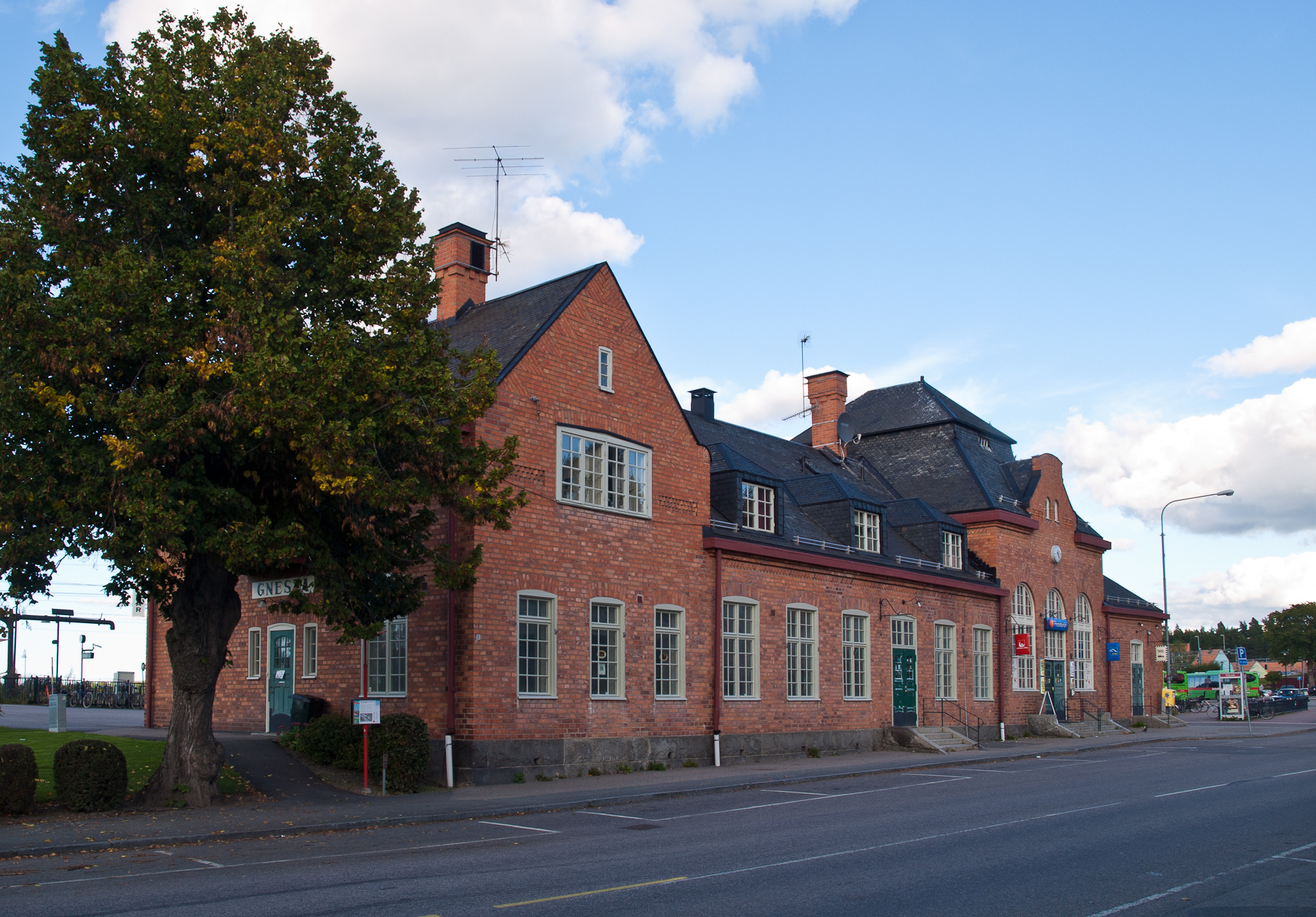
- Gnesta station

General information
- Location: Gnesta, Gnesta Municipality, Södermanland County; Sweden
- Coordinates: 59.0482°N 17.3117°E
- System: Pendeltåg, Mälartåg
- Owner: Swedish Transport Administration
- Line: Western Main Line
- Platforms: 2 Side platforms
- Tracks: 3
- Connections: Bus connections

Construction
- Structure type: At-grade

Other information
- Station code: Gn

History
- Opened: 1861

Passengers
- 2011: Approx. 2800 outbound commuters daily (2011)

Services
Preceding station	Stockholm commuter rail	Following station
Terminus	48	Södertälje Syd towards Södertälje Centrum
Preceding station	Regional trains	Following station
Terminus	Mälartåg	Terminus
Södertälje Syd towards Stockholm Central	Mälartåg	Flen towards Hallsberg
Location

Gnesta station is a railway station located in Gnesta, Södermanland County, Sweden. It is located 66 kilometers south of Stockholm, and is one of a few stations on Stockholm's commuter rail network located outside of Stockholm County. The station is also used for services operated by Mälartåg. Gnesta station was opened in 1861 as part of the Western Main Line.

== History ==
=== The early years (1861–1900) ===
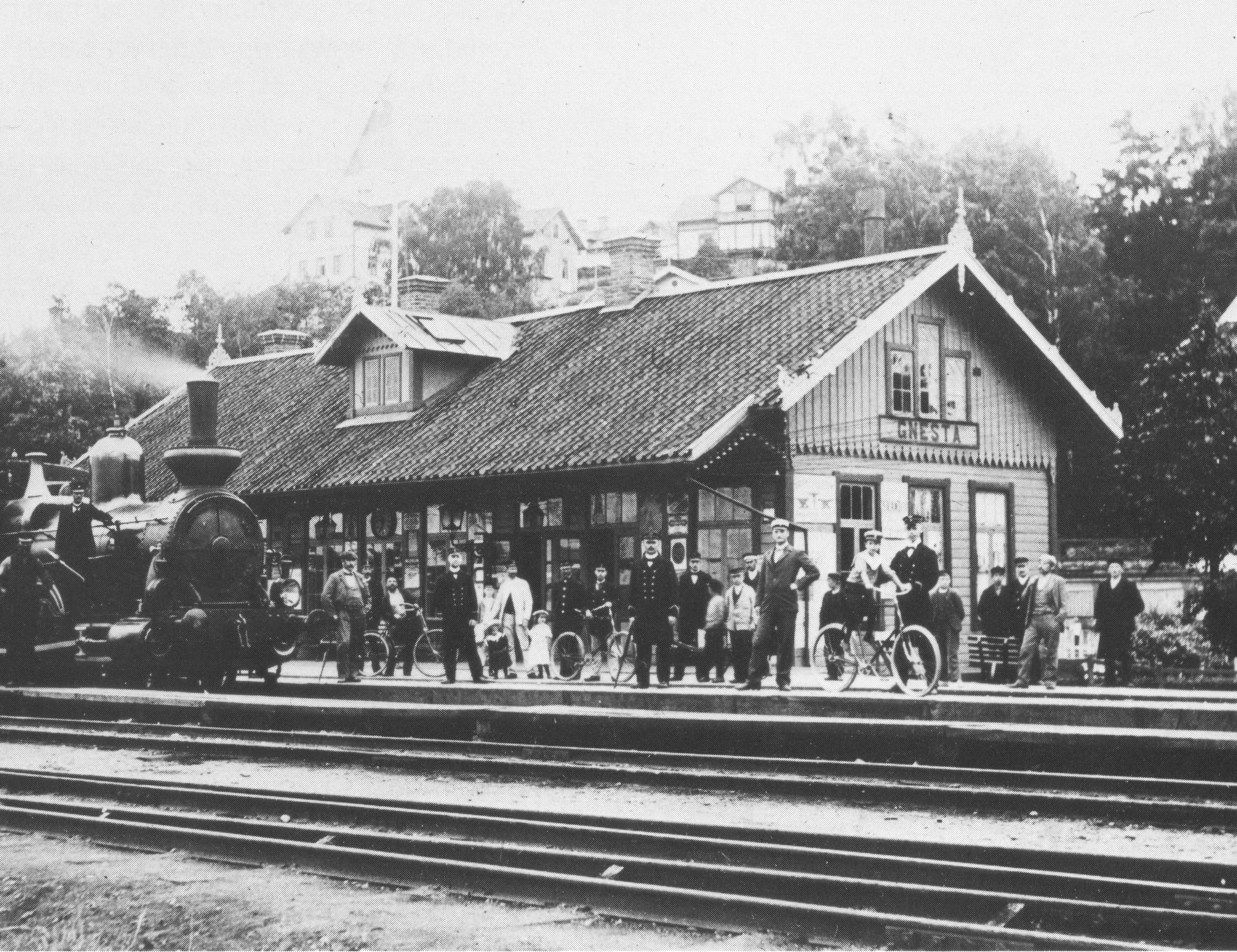
Gnesta station around 1900

The first section of the Western Main Line between Järna and Gnesta was inaugurated on 1 October 1861. At that time, Gnesta station was the terminus of the railway line extending from Stockholm Södra. The next year, in 1862, the entire Western Main Line from Gothenburg Central Station to Stockholm Södra was completed, and this was celebrated with a special royal train, which made a ten-minute stop in Gnesta. Upon its arrival at Gothenburg Central the next day, the Kings of Sweden and Norway, Karl XV, declared the railway officially open.

The station building was designed by Adolf W. Edelsvärd, the chief architect of Statens Järnvägar, and was constructed in wood. Alongside the station building, several other facilities were created, including coal sheds, a locomotive shed, a railway restaurant, housing for the staff, a laundry, a root cellar, outhouses, and a goods depot. The station house at Gnesta also served as the prototype for one of the standard models used by Swedish Railways (SJ), known as the Gnestamodellen. Additionally, two water cranes were installed, one of which has been preserved and stands in front of the station building since 2007 as one of the few remaining water cranes along the Western Main Line.

The establishment of the station led to the growth of Gnesta from a small collection of farms to a small railway town, with industries like a brewery, cigar factory, matchstick factory, and several other businesses.

The station became a frequent stop for King Oscar II, who would visit on his way to Tullgarn Palace. The royal family often dined at the railway restaurant, which was run by Albert Jones and his relatives, and other royals, including the Kings of Portugal and Saxony and the Prince of Wales, also frequented the establishment. The restaurant became so closely associated with the king that a special dining room was created, furnished with royal furniture and porcelain.

During this period, the station had its largest staff, with 60 employees under the supervision of the station inspector. Other roles included railway engineers, station clerks, track guards, bridge attendants, office assistants, pump operators, and porters. The first station inspector was Adolf Norberg.

=== The golden age (1900–1950) ===
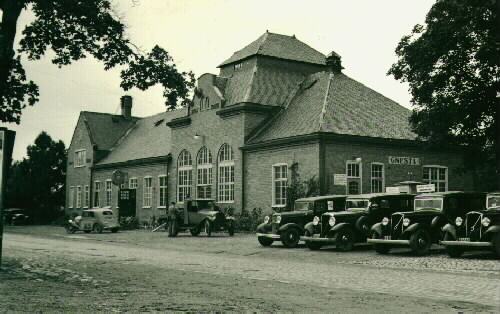
Gnesta station in 1938

By 1907, the original station building had become outdated and was replaced with the current station house, which was built in brick and designed by Folke Zettervall, who had succeeded Edelsvärd as chief architect of SJ in 1895. Zettervall also designed a new locomotive shed, completed in 1905.

In 1945, a project to expand the station yard began, and an overtrack manager, John Frisk, was appointed to oversee the work. The expansion also involved the labor of 200 railway workers.

In 1950, an overtrack manager's residence and a station master's office were added.

=== Decline, commuter rail and reopening (1950–present) ===
With the rise of car traffic in the 1950s and 1960s, many railway lines were closed, and in 1968, long-distance trains ceased operating at Gnesta. All six employees at the station were laid off, except for the last station inspector, Stig Johansson, who remained in service until 1988.

However, the station was not completely closed, as the Stockholm commuter rail extended its services to Gnesta, making it an important commuter hub. This resulted in Gnesta becoming a major commuter town: by 2011, there were about 2,800 people commuting out of Gnesta, and around 800 people commuting into the town.

In 1986, the station building was designated a heritage site.

On 20 August 2007, long-distance train services were reintroduced at Gnesta station by then Infrastructure Minister Åsa Torstensson.

After the deregulation of the Swedish rail network, congestion on the tracks led to proposals for the removal of commuter services from Gnesta in 2014. After extensive discussions, it was decided that the services would remain, but with three daily departures terminating at Järna.

== Gallery ==
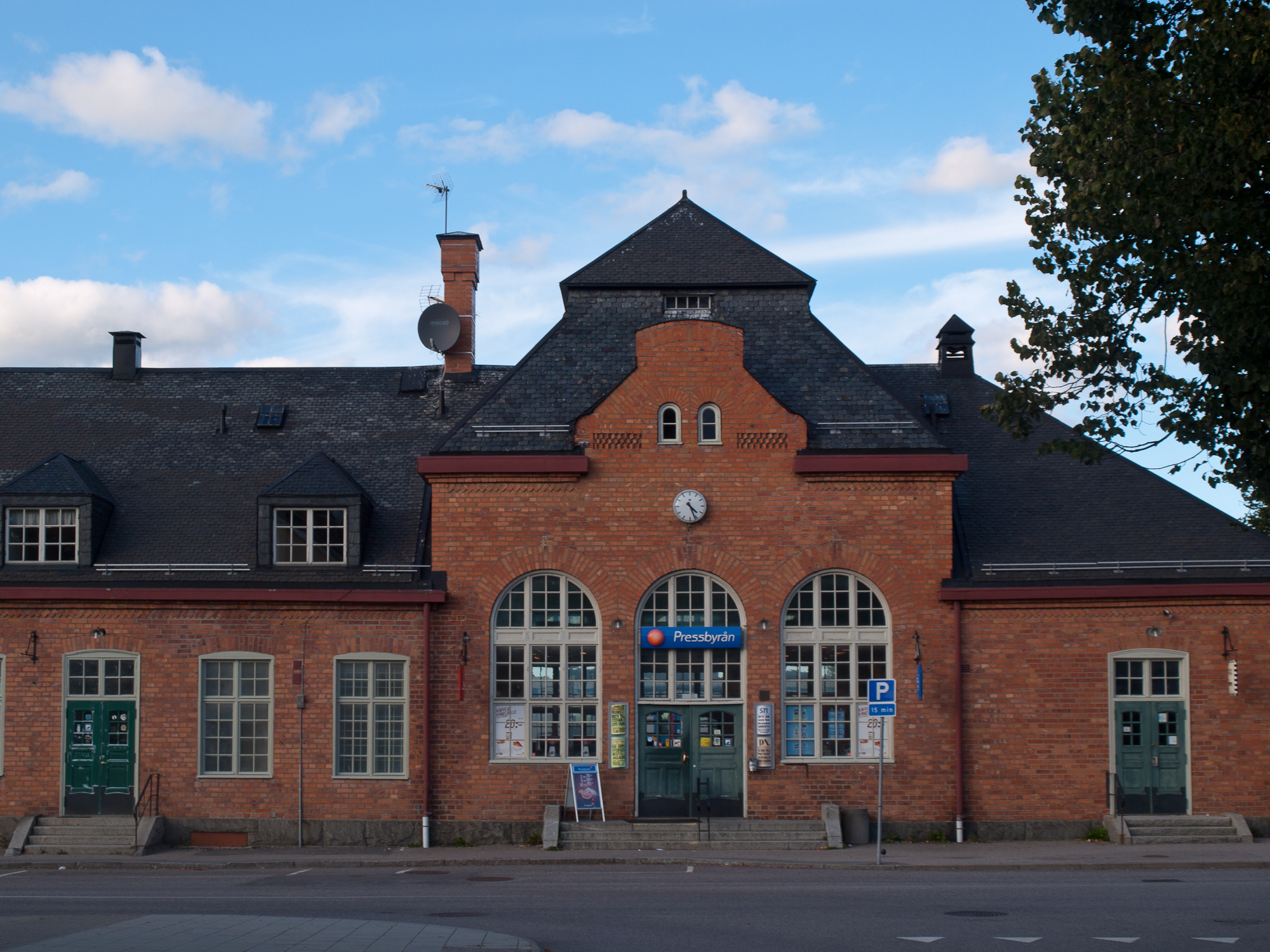
Station building in Gnesta (from the street)

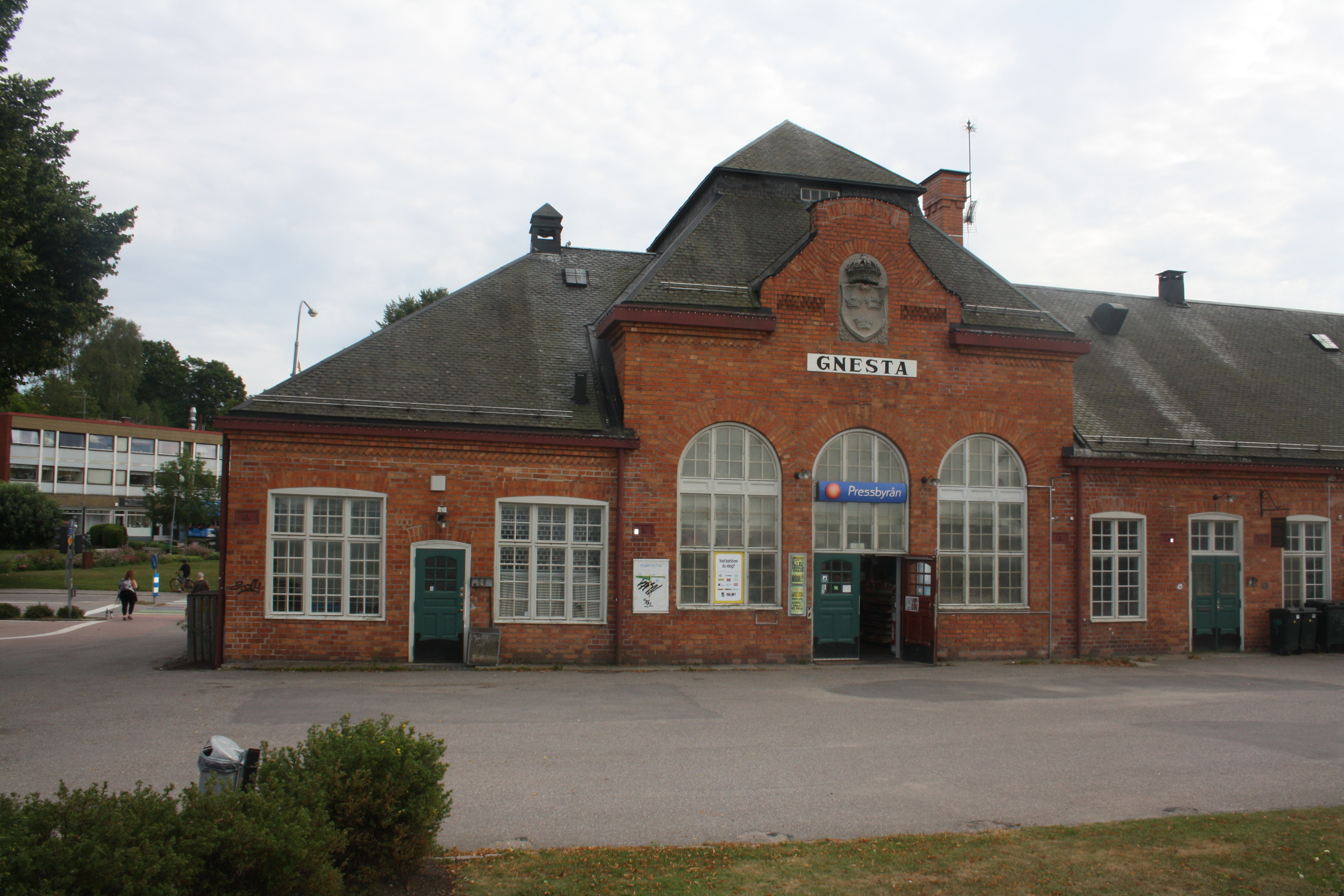
Station building seen from the railway

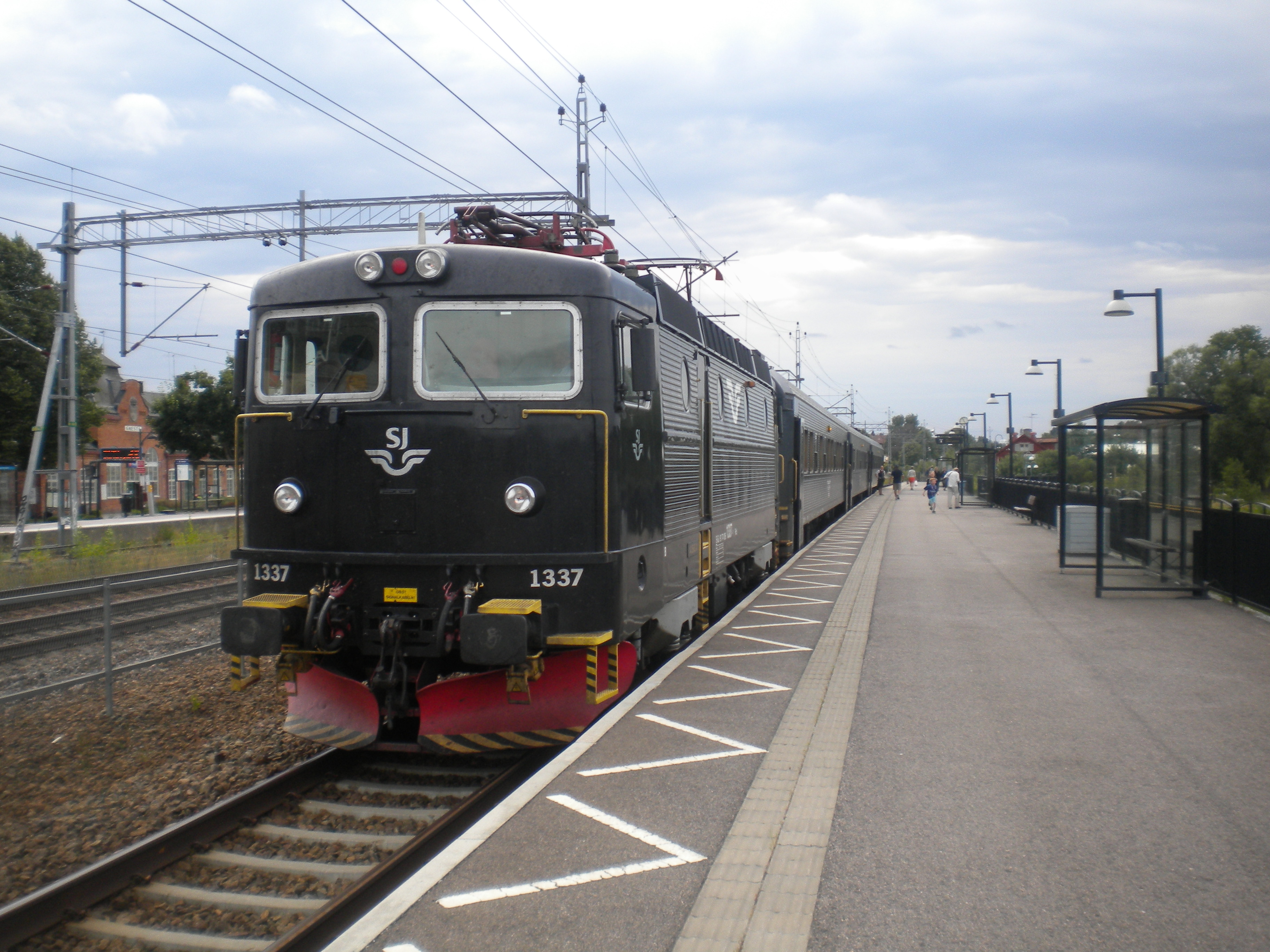
SJ regional train at Gnesta station, 2013

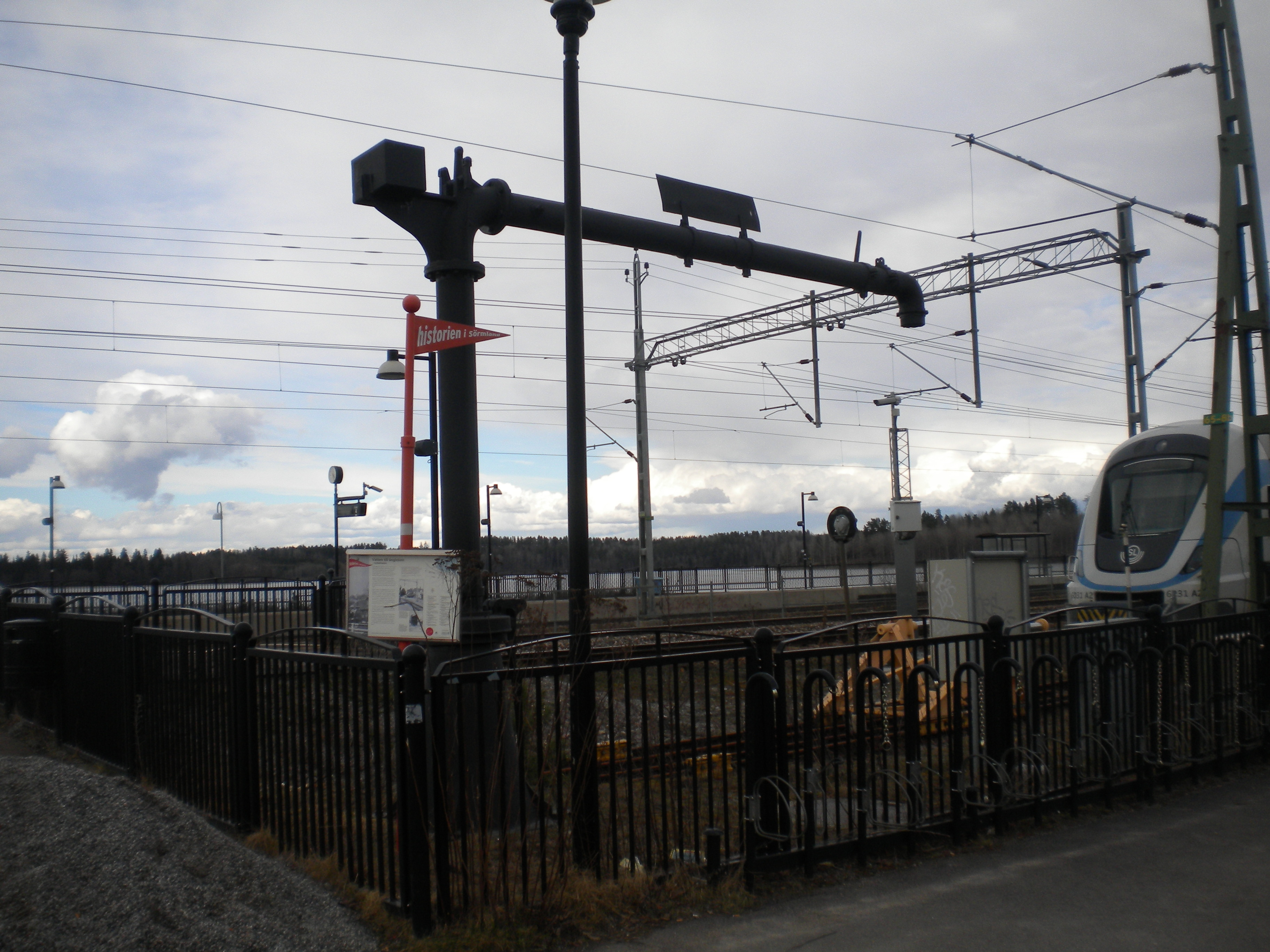
The preserved water horse

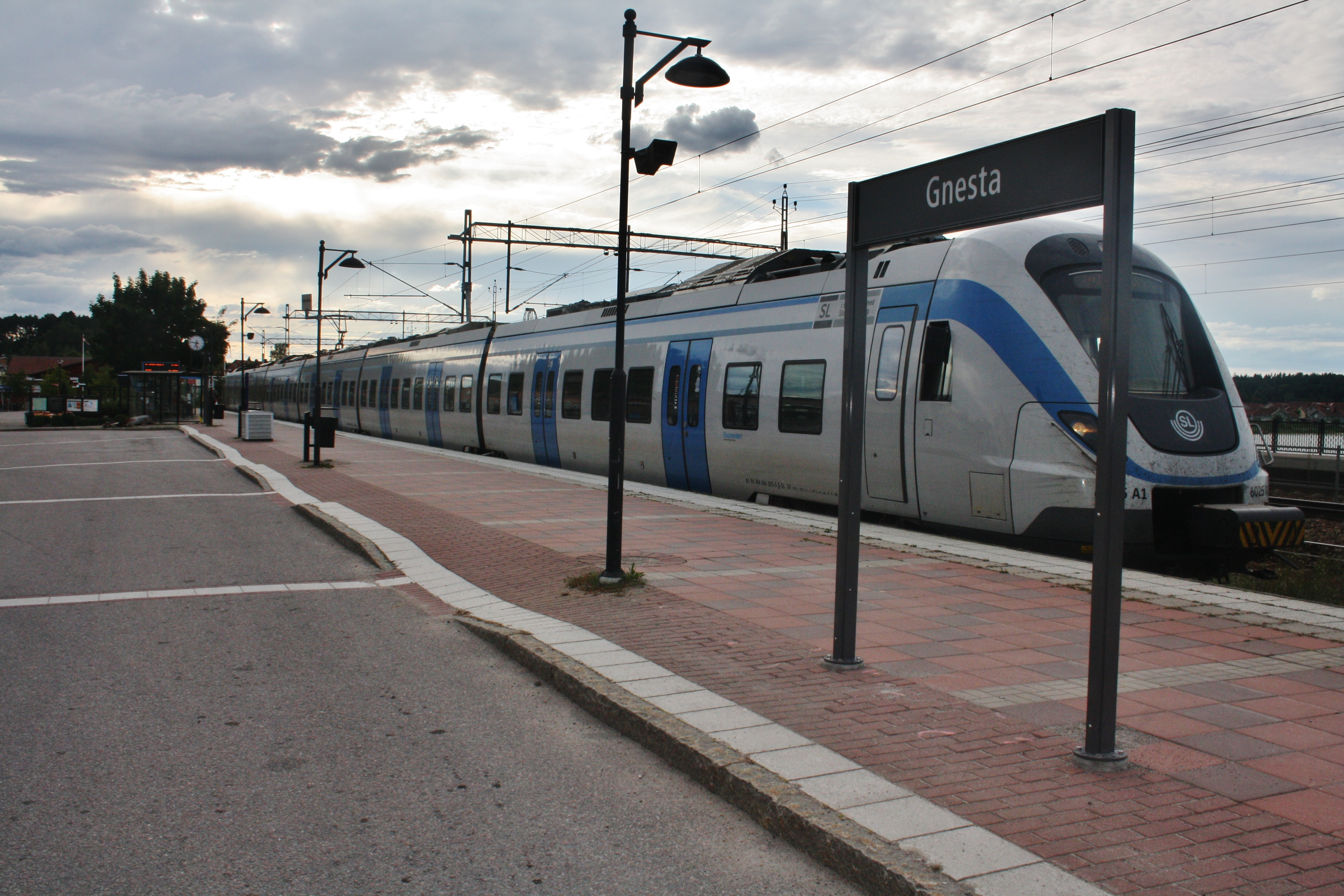
SL commuter train in Gnesta, 2016
