= Saltskogsfjärden =

Lake in Södertälje Municipality, Sweden

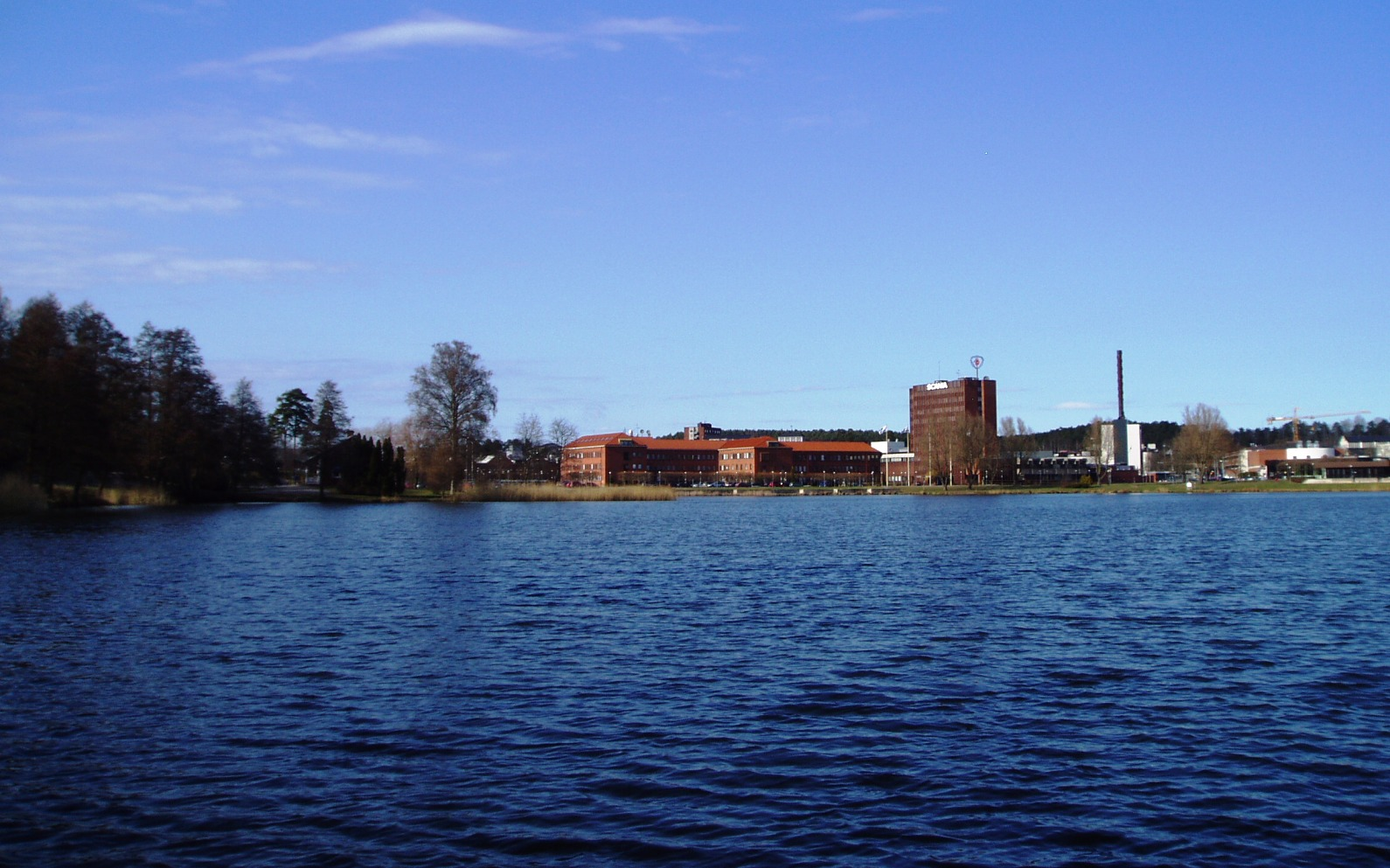

- Location within Stockholm
- Coordinates: 59°10′48″N 17°38′06″E
- Basin countries: Sweden

Saltskogsfjärden is a lake in Stockholm County, Södermanland, Sweden.
