= Karlberg railway station =

Commuter rail station in Stockholm, Sweden

Karlberg
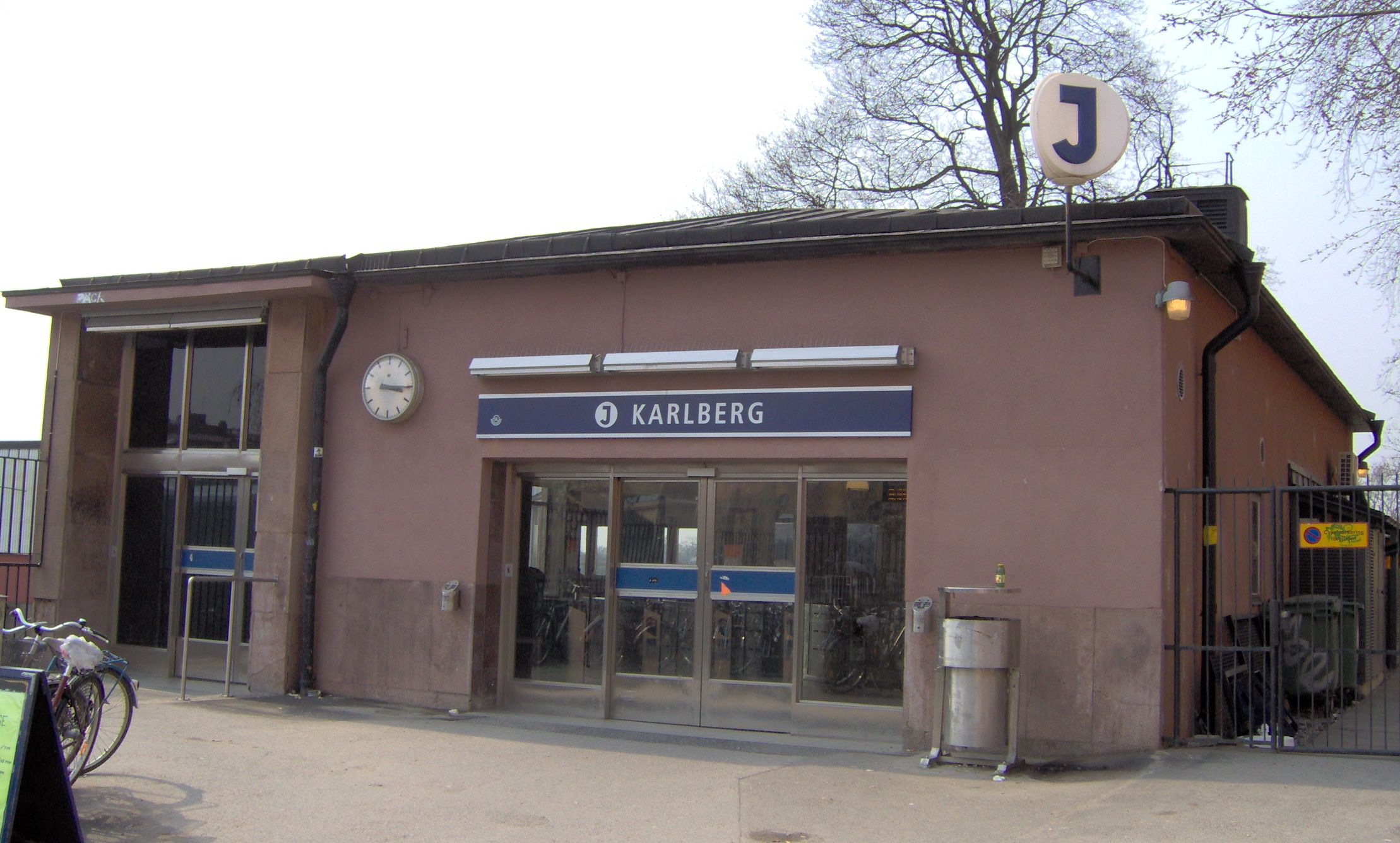
- View of Karlberg Station entrance in 2006

General information
- Location: Vasastan, Stockholm, Sweden
- Coordinates: 59°20′23″N 18°01′47″E
- Owner: Trafikverket
- Line: East Coast Line
- Platforms: 2 Island Platforms
- Tracks: 4
- Train operators: SL (Former)

Construction
- Structure type: At-grade
- Platform levels: 1

History
- Opened: 3 November 1882
- Closed: 10 July 2017

Passengers
- 14,200 boardings and 14,700 alightings daily (2013) (commuter rail)
Location

Karlberg railway station is a disused commuter rail station located in Stockholm, Sweden. It served as a part of the Stockholm commuter rail network from its opening in 1882 until its closure on 10 July 2017. Following the inauguration of the Citybanan railway tunnel, Karlberg railway station was replaced by Stockholm Odenplan station. The station has been retained for use as a reserve station.

== History ==
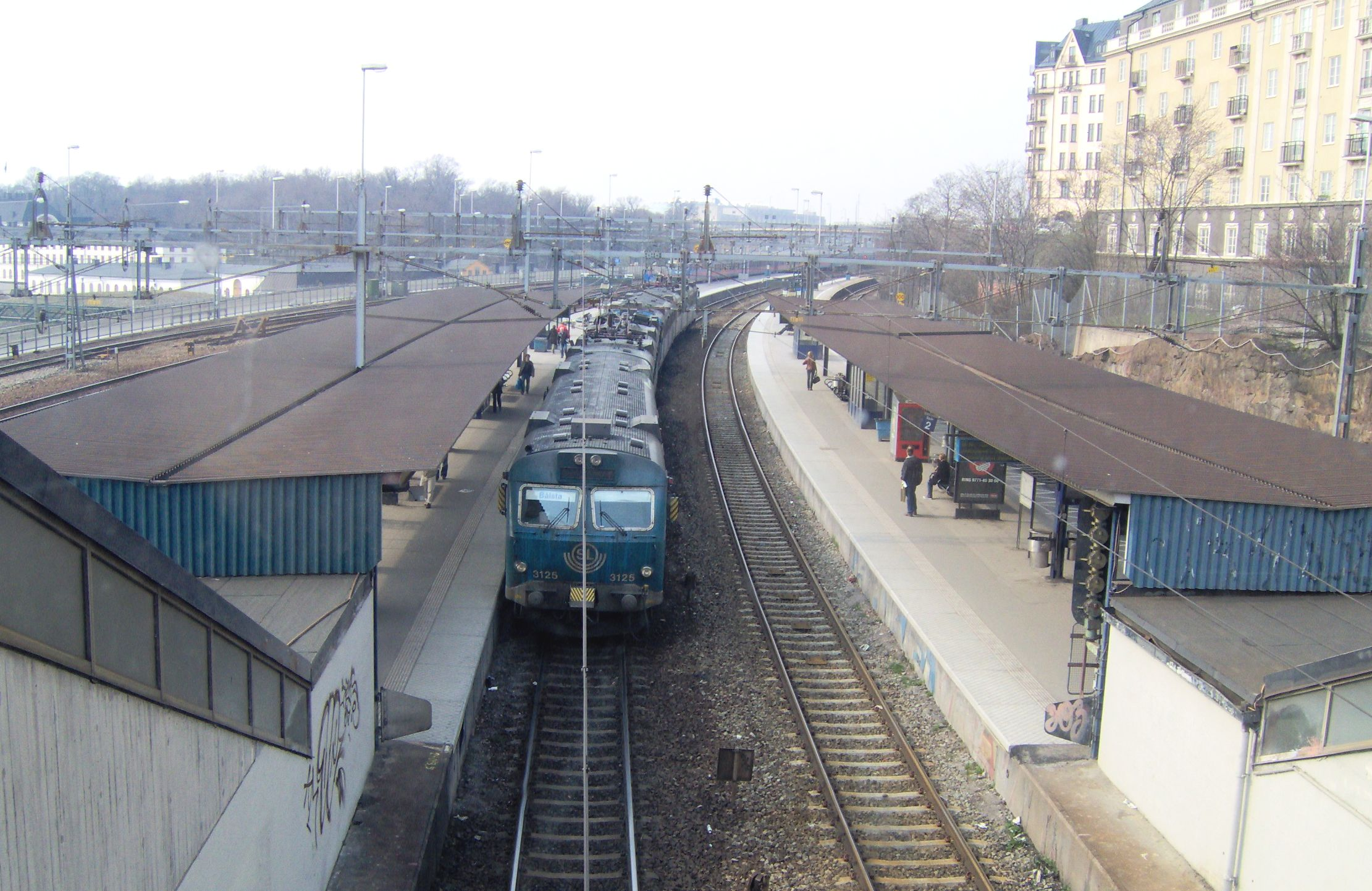
Karlberg station in 2006

Karlberg railway station was established on 3 November 1882 to serve the growing transportation needs of Stockholm. It was named after Karlberg Palace, situated nearby. Initially, the station's entrance was located at the underpass of Rörstrandsgatan.

The station was built alongside the construction of the Värtabanan railway, which connected Karlberg to Värtahamnen via Tomteboda. The station was positioned at the junction where Värtabanan met the Ostkustbanan (East Coast Line). Although passenger services on the Värtabanan ceased in 1913, Karlberg continued to serve other passenger lines.

In 1932, a new station building was constructed at Norrbackagatan. Significant modernisation occurred in the early 1970s after Storstockholms Lokaltrafik (SL) assumed responsibility for commuter rail services. The station underwent a renovation in 2005. At its peak in 2013, Karlberg handled approximately 14,200 boardings and 14,700 alightings daily, making it one of Stockholm's busiest stations.

== Layout and Facilities ==
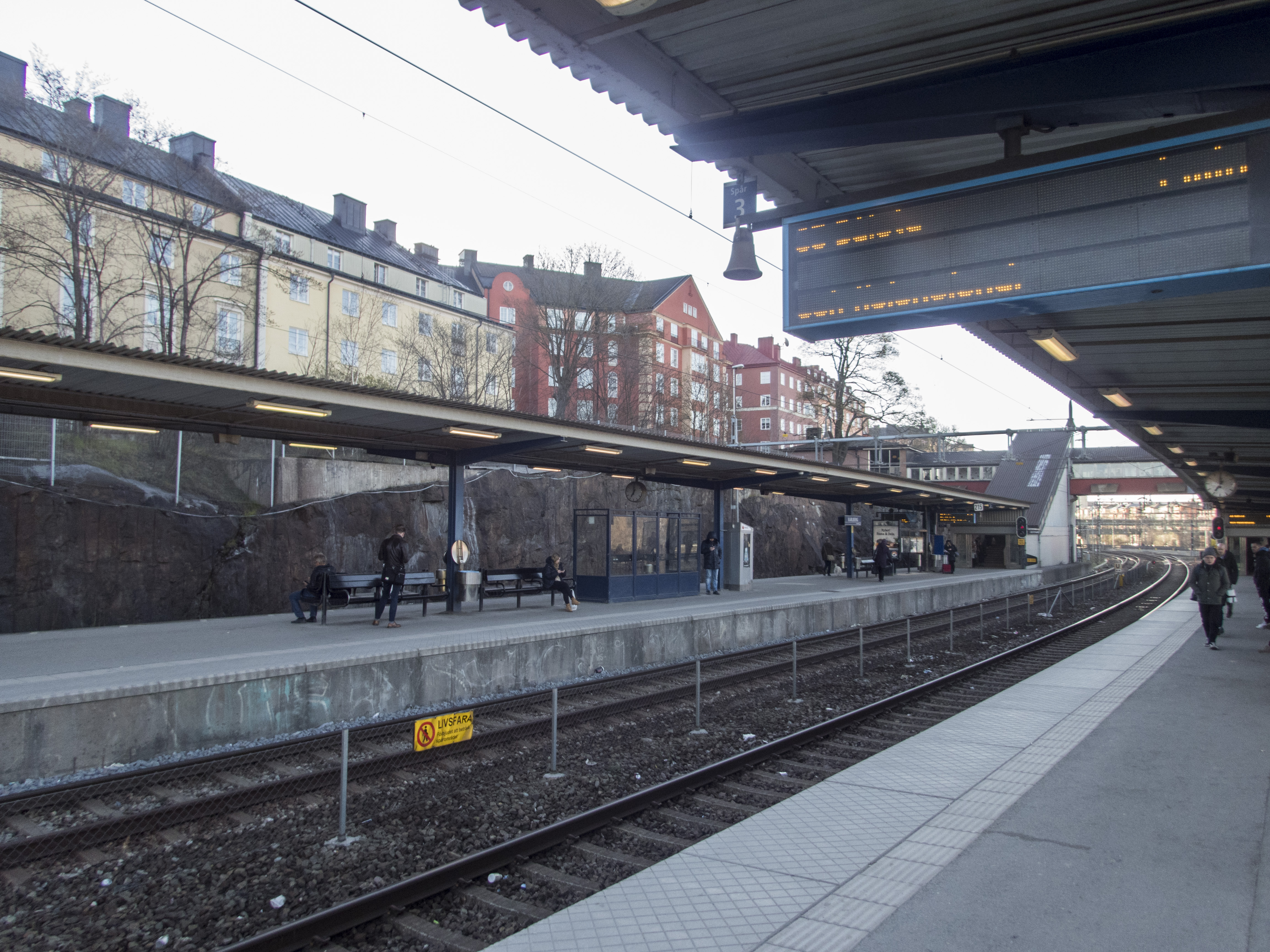
Platforms in 2017

Karlberg featured two island platforms, one serving northbound and the other southbound commuter trains. The station's tracks also accommodated passing intercity and freight train services.

The ticket hall, located at Norrbackagatan 3, was accessible via stairs, lifts, and escalators. The station was noted for its limited connectivity to other forms of public transport. The nearest Stockholm Metro station, Sankt Eriksplan, was approximately 400 meters away, and bus services to the station were minimal.

== Closure and replacement ==
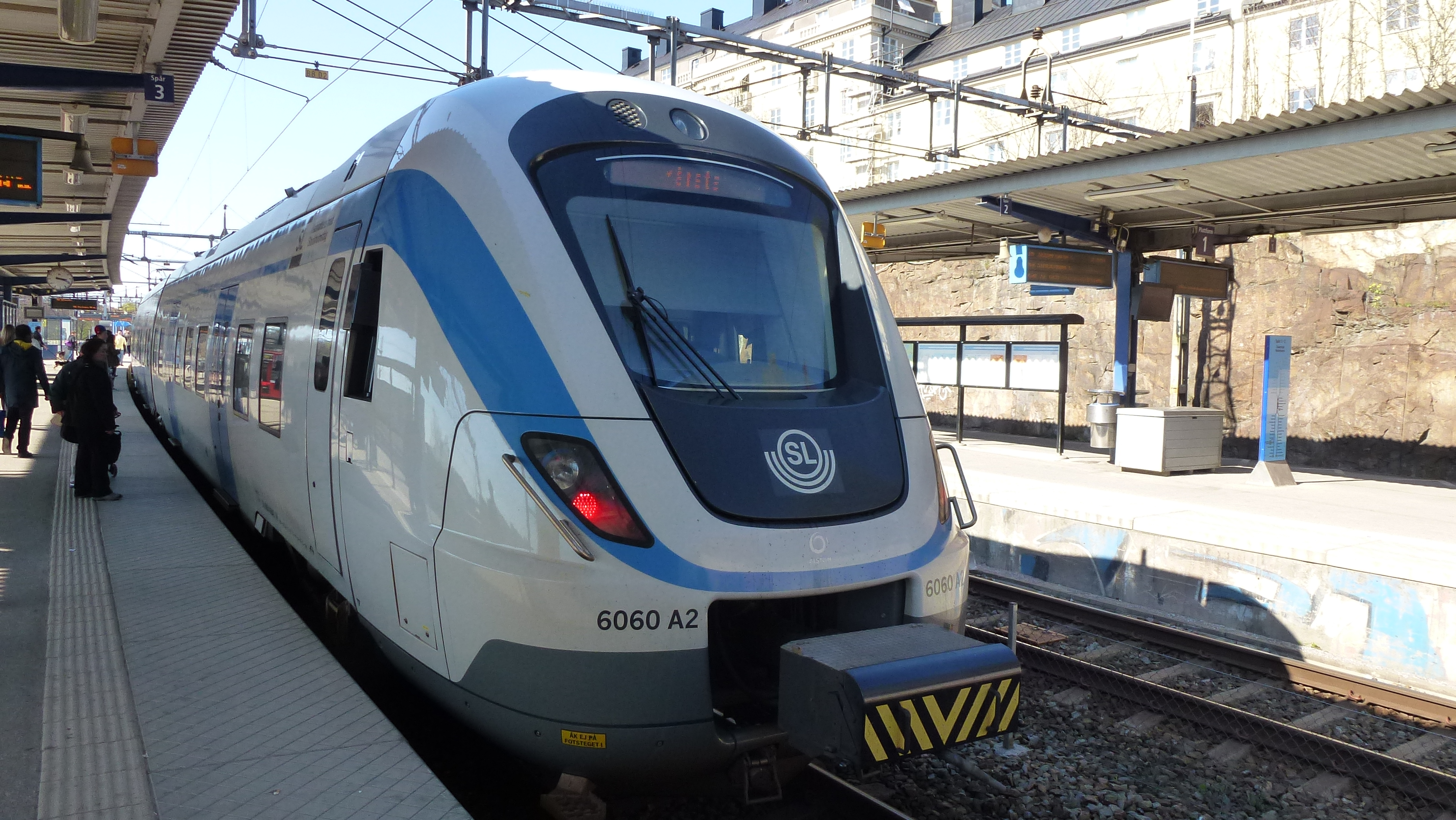
SL Commuter train at Karlberg

Karlberg railway station was closed on 10 July 2017, with the opening of the Stockholm City Line. A new commuter train station, Stockholm Odenplan railway station, took over Karlberg's commuter rail traffic.

=== Use as a reserve station ===
While originally planned for demolition, Karlberg railway station has been retained as a reserve station. Renovation work from 2023 to early 2025 has focused on ensuring the station's structural integrity, including repairing worn concrete in the pedestrian bridges and reinforcing structural supports. These upgrades to keep the station viable for use in case of disruptions at Stockholm Central Station.
