= Stockholm Odenplan railway station =

Stockholm Odenplan
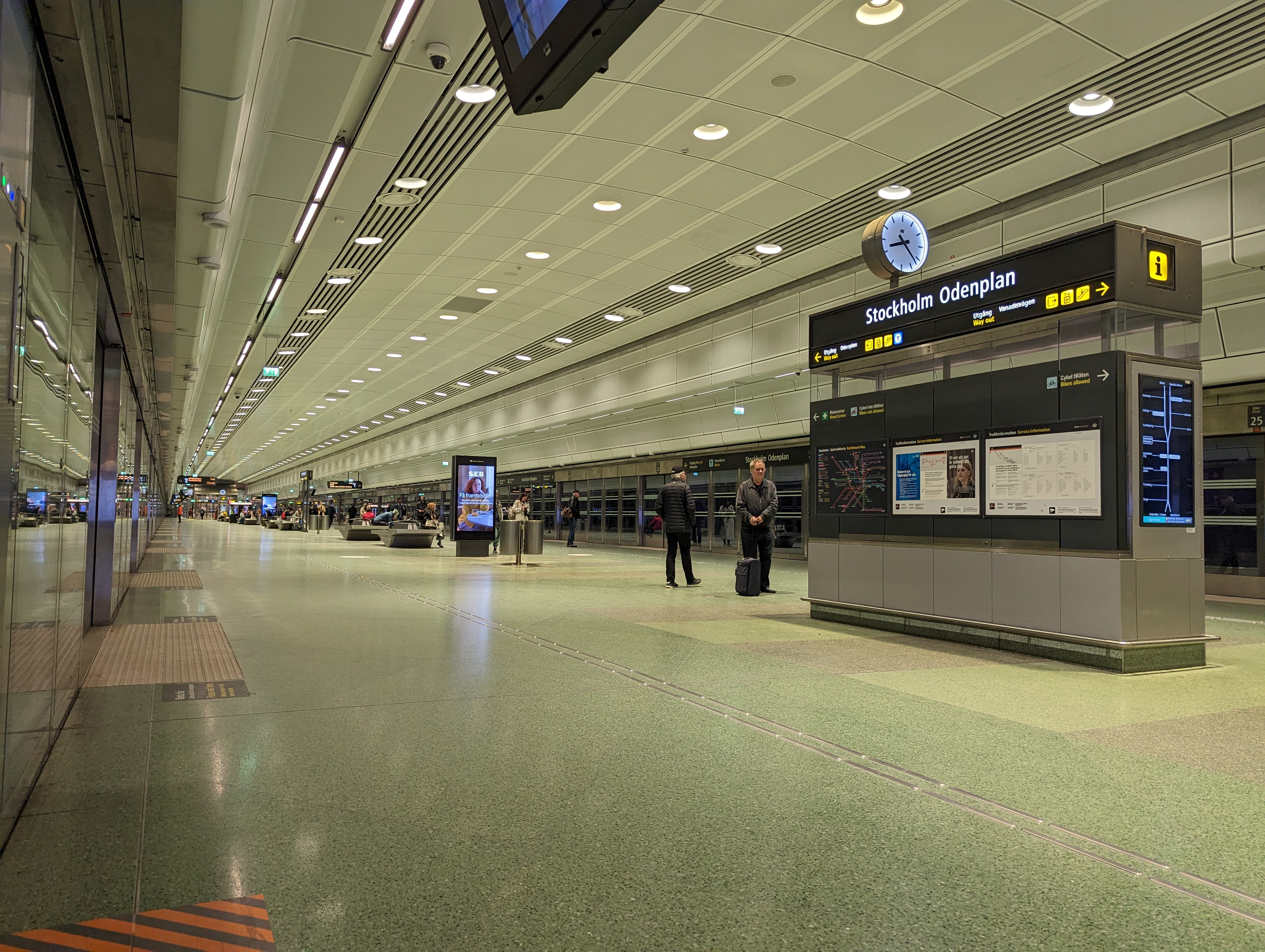
- Platform level

General information
- Location: Stockholm, Sweden
- System: Pendeltåg
- Owner: Trafikverket
- Operator: Storstockholms Lokaltrafik
- Line: Citybanan
- Platforms: 1 island platform with platform screen doors
- Tracks: 2
- Connections: Metro: Green Line (Odenplan metro station)

Construction
- Structure type: Underground
- Depth: 30 m
- Cycle facilities: 347 spaces

Other information
- Station code: Sod

History
- Opened: 10 July 2017

Passengers
- 2019: 42,700 boarding per weekday

Services
Preceding station	Stockholm commuter rail	Following station
Stockholm City towards Uppsala C	40	Solna towards Södertälje centrum
Stockholm City towards Märsta	41	Solna towards Södertälje centrum
Stockholm City towards Märsta	42X	Solna towards Nynäshamn
Stockholm City towards Bålsta	43	Solna towards Nynäshamn
Stockholm City towards Kallhäll	43X	Solna towards Nynäshamn
Stockholm City towards Bro	44	Solna towards Tumba

Stockholm Odenplan is a station on the Stockholm commuter rail network (Pendeltåg) located in Vasastan, central Stockholm, Sweden. The station is located beneath and adjacent to Odenplan metro station on the Stockholm Metro. It opened on 10 July 2017 as part of Citybanan, a cross-city mainline railway tunnel under central Stockholm, and replaced the nearby Karlberg railway station.

The station is located approximately 30 m (98 ft) below ground and has two tracks serving an island platform. It is connected to the metro station and has entrances at Odenplan and at the junction of Dalagatan and Vanadisvägen. The station also provides an interchange with the metro's Green Line.

== History ==
Stockholm Odenplan was built as part of Citybanan, a new commuter railway tunnel beneath central Stockholm. The project created a dedicated north–south route for commuter trains through the city, relieving congestion on the existing railway. The station opened on 10 July 2017 and replaced Karlberg railway station, which closed when Citybanan entered service.

Both the Vasatunnel and the station were constructed by the German contractor Bilfinger Berger, under a contract valued at approximately SEK 1.1 billion. The station's interior completion works and entrance building were undertaken by Q-gruppen AB. The station was designed with provision for a possible future expansion to two platforms and four tracks.

== Location and facilities ==
The station has an island platform approximately 30 m (98 ft) below ground, with platform screen doors along the tracks.

Entrances and connections include:

- A shared ticket hall and main entrance with the metro station at Odenplan.
- A northern entrance at the junction of Dalagatan and Vanadisvägen, next to Sankt Matteus Church.
- A connection to the metro platforms.

The station is connected to the metro station by passageways, allowing interchange between the commuter rail and the Green Line without leaving the station complex.

Bus stops serving SL buses are located in the vicinity at street level

== Passenger statistics ==
According to SL's 2019 statistics, Stockholm Odenplan had approximately 42,700 boarding passengers per weekday.

== Cycling facilities ==
A bicycle garage adjacent to the station opened on 1 September 2016. It has a capacity of 347 bicycles.

When the station opened, bicycles were permitted on commuter trains via the entrance at Dalagatan and Vanadisvägen. The other entrances, which connect through the metro station, were not designated for bicycle access.

== Art ==
The station features six artworks:

- "Voyage" by Jessica Faiss
- "Itinerary" by Anders Kapple
- "Länk" by Sunniva McAlindein
- "Rörlig rymd" by Thomas Bernstrand
- "Life Line" by David Svensson
- "Odens Trädgård" by Mari Rantanen

The works were commissioned as part of the artistic programme for Citybanan.

Artwork

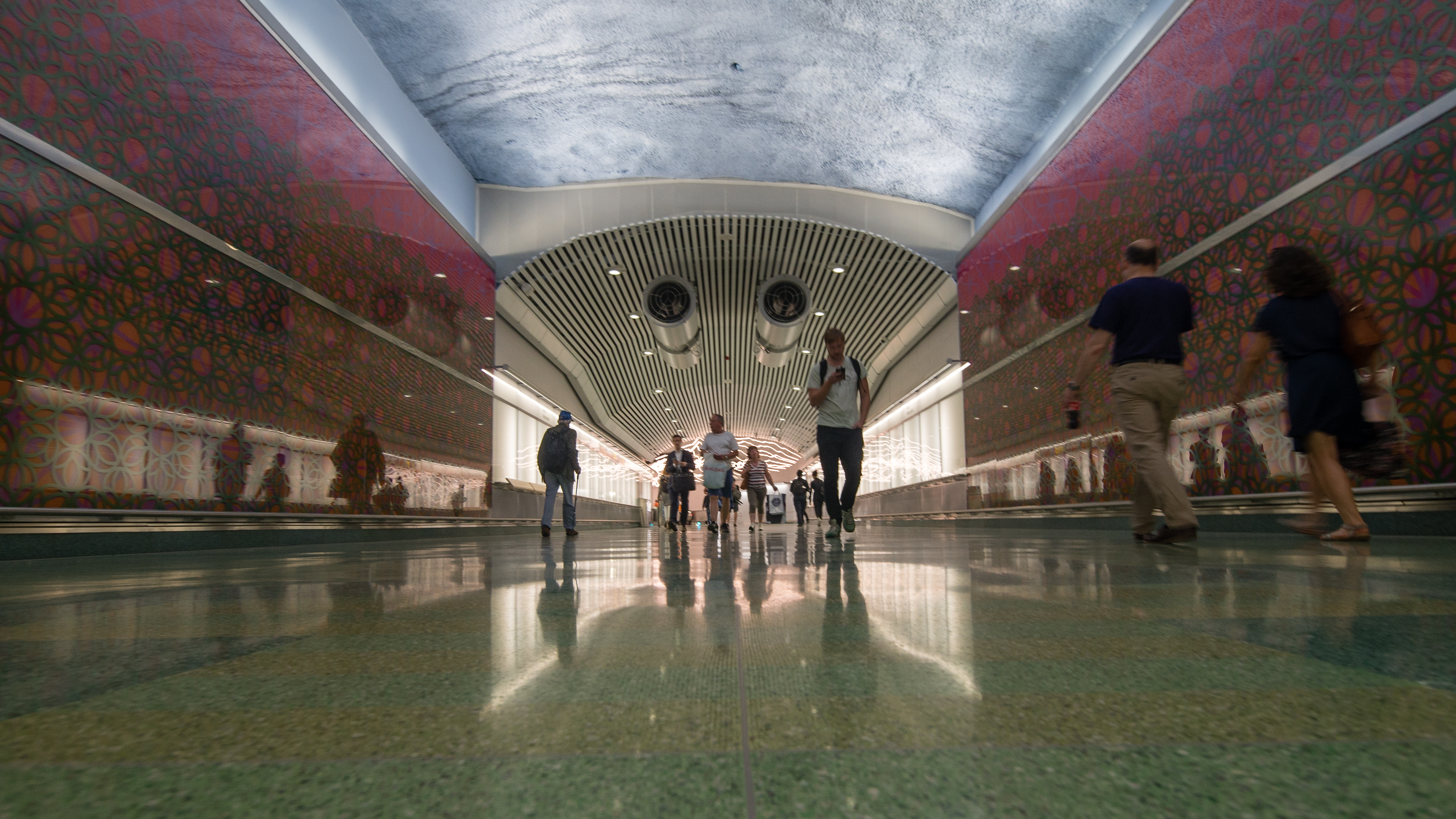

== Future ==
=== Roslagsbanan extension ===
Roslagsbanan, a narrow-gauge railway serving northeastern Stockholm County, is planned to be extended underground from Universitetet via Odenplan to T-Centralen. The project, known as Roslagsbanan till City, is intended to provide a new interchange between the railway, Stockholm commuter rail and the metro.

The proposed Roslagsbanan station at Odenplan would be located beneath the existing commuter rail station. Plans envisage escalator connections between the station levels, allowing passengers to transfer between Roslagsbanan, commuter rail and the Green Line within the station complex. Some existing underground facilities may need to be altered to accommodate the new connections. The extension is intended to shorten journeys between northeastern Stockholm County and central Stockholm and reduce passenger pressure on the Red Line between T-Centralen and Tekniska högskolan.

The project would also involve the closure of the existing Roslagsbanan section between Universitetet and Stockholm Östra station when the new route enters service. Construction is planned to begin around 2030, with the new railway expected to open around 2040.

== Gallery ==
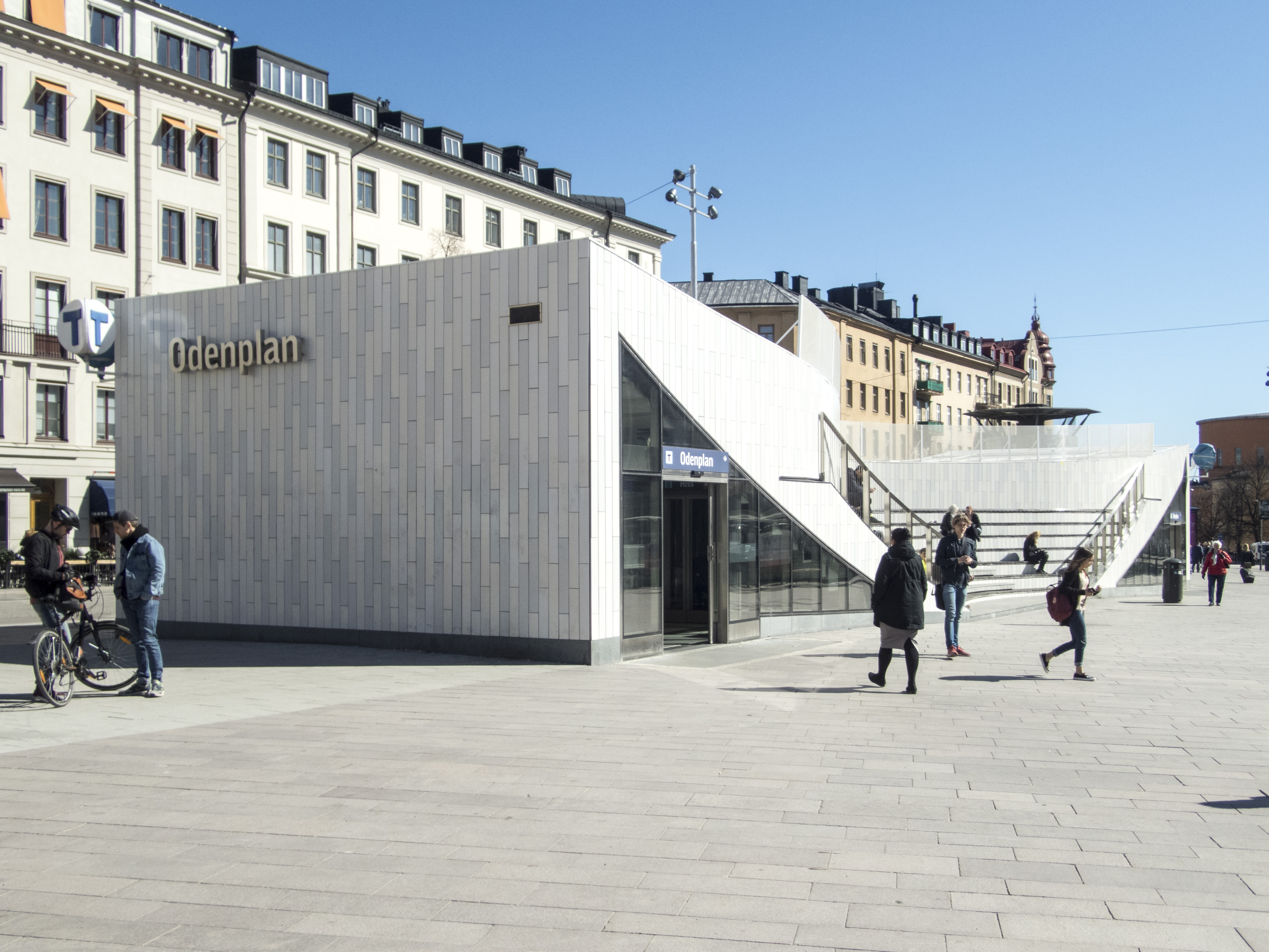
Main entrance on Odenplan square

Northern entrance

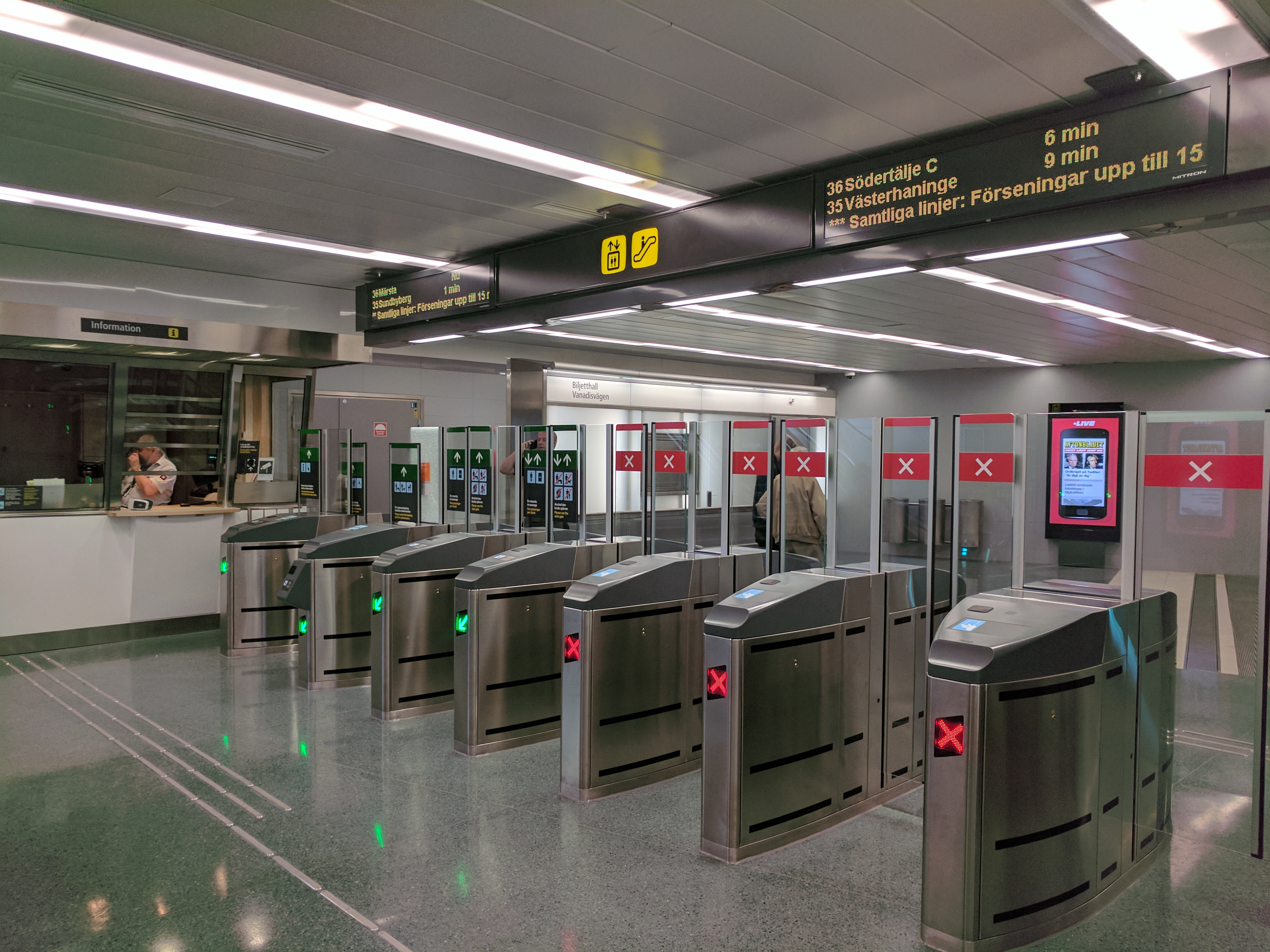
Ticket barriers

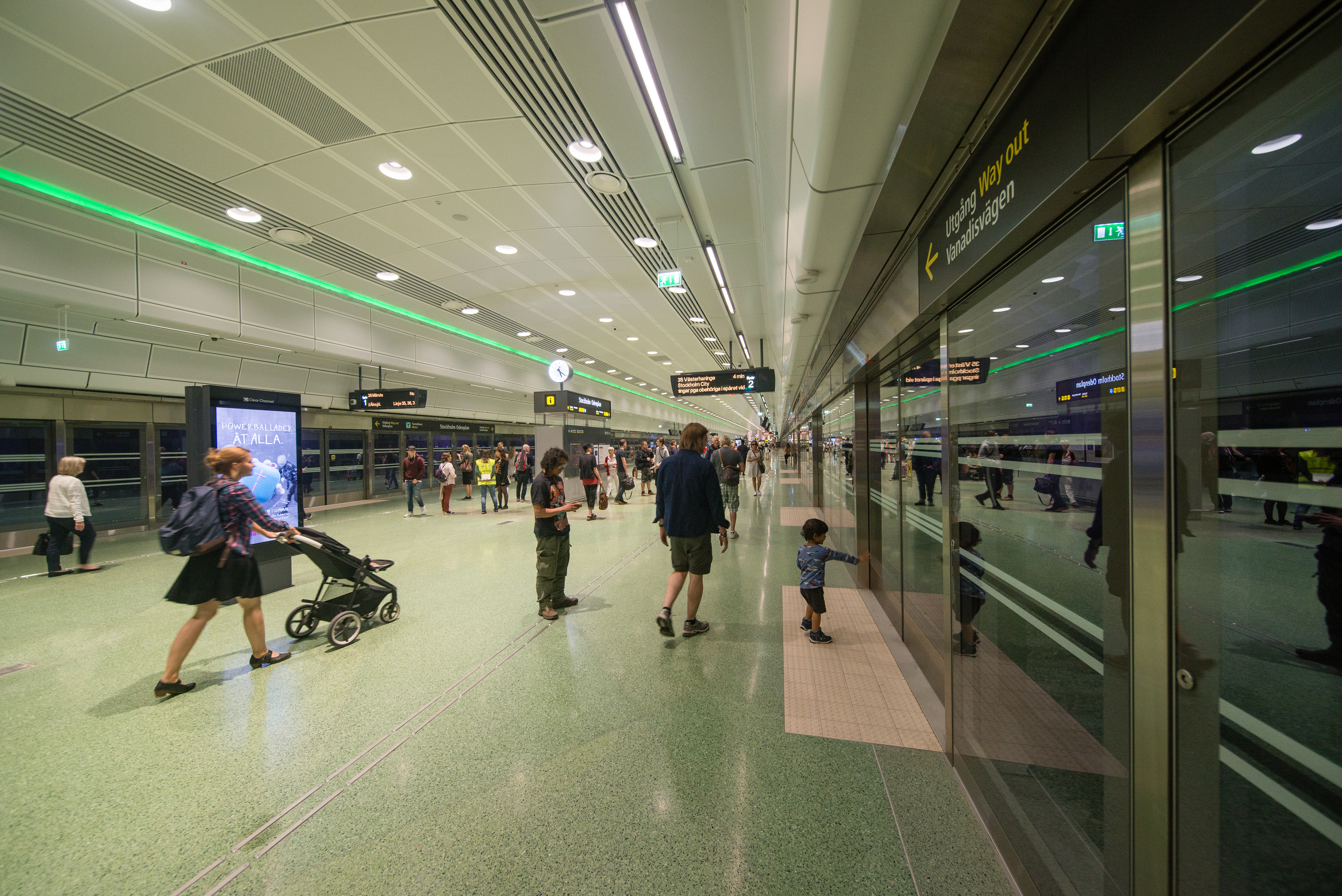
Commuter rail platforms

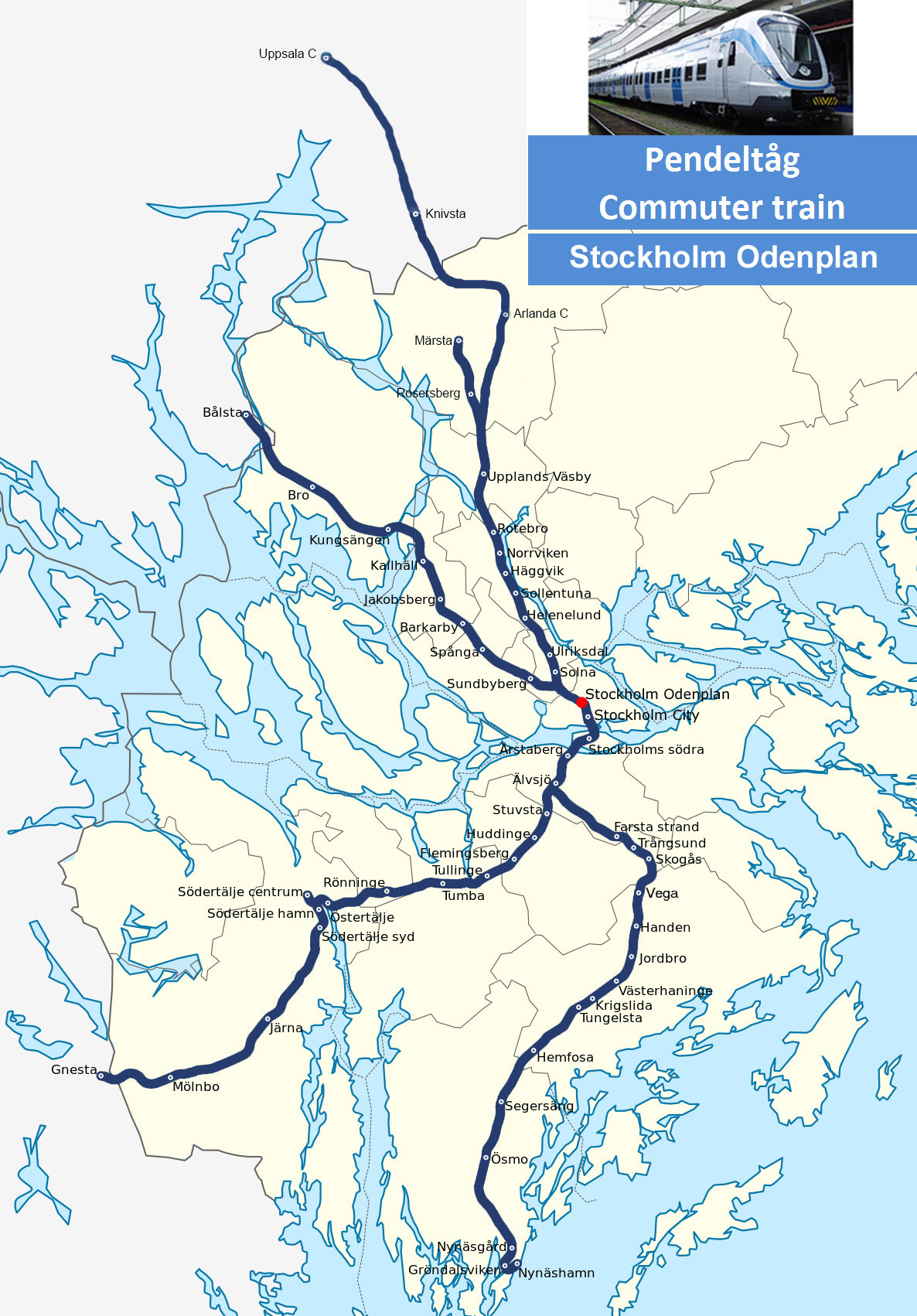
Location on the commuter rail network
