= Värtabanan =

Freight railway line in Sweden

Värtabanan is a freight railway line just north of urban Stockholm, from Tomteboda via Norra Djurgården to Värtahamnen. It is nowadays mainly used for freight traffic linking Stockholm to the container port at Frihamnen, although a passenger service was operated on this line until 1913. A train ferry service also operated on Värtabanan between 1967 and 1975 (Stockholm – Naantali) and again from 1989 until the start of 2012 (Stockholm – Turku).

== Operations ==
The line is electrified, single-track, and supports a maximum speed of 40 km/h. It is active for freight and primarily managed by operators such as Green Cargo and Hector Rail, under the infrastructure oversight of Trafikverket, Sweden’s Transport Administration.

== Gallery ==
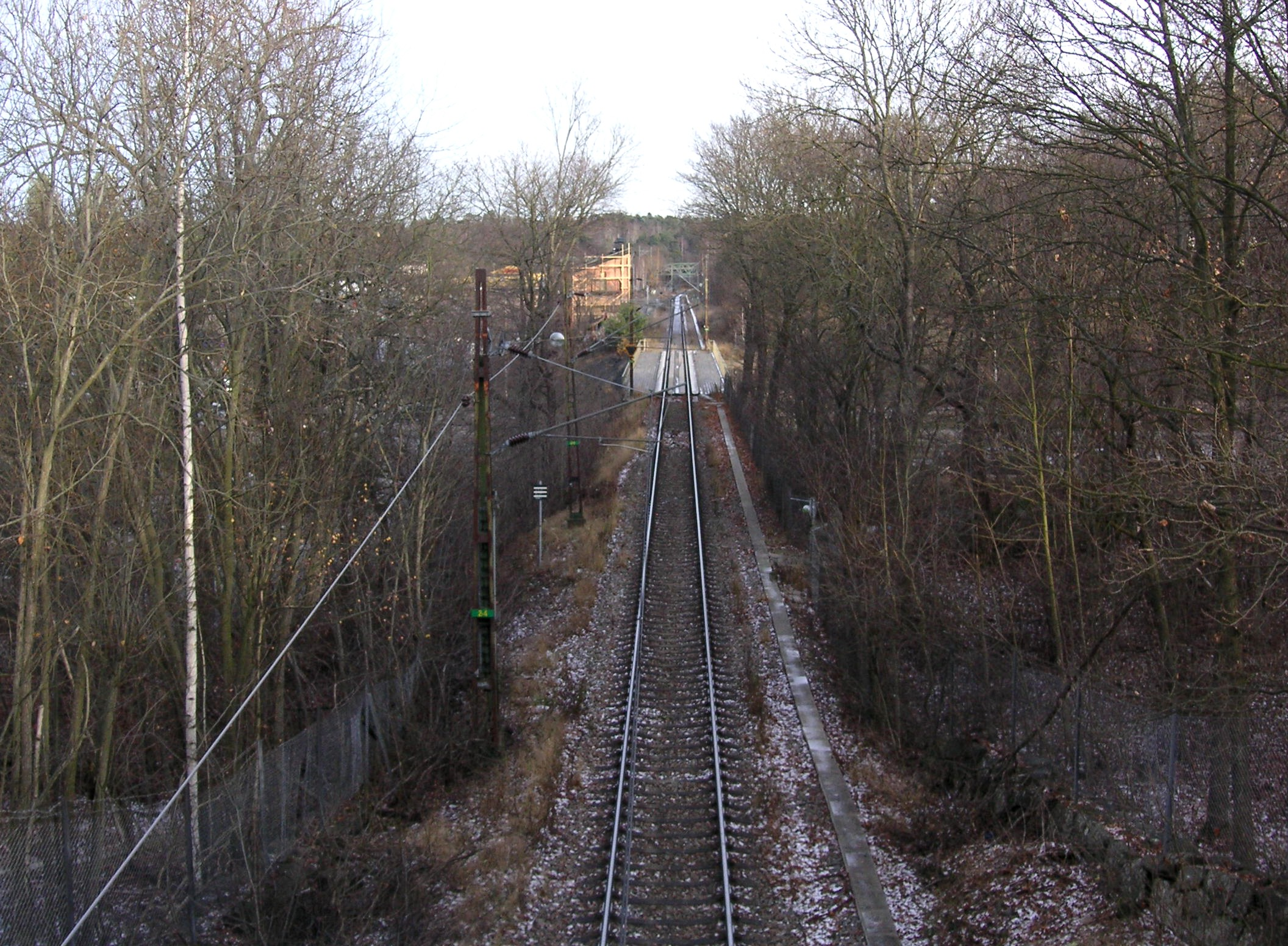
Värtabanan in Bellevueparken

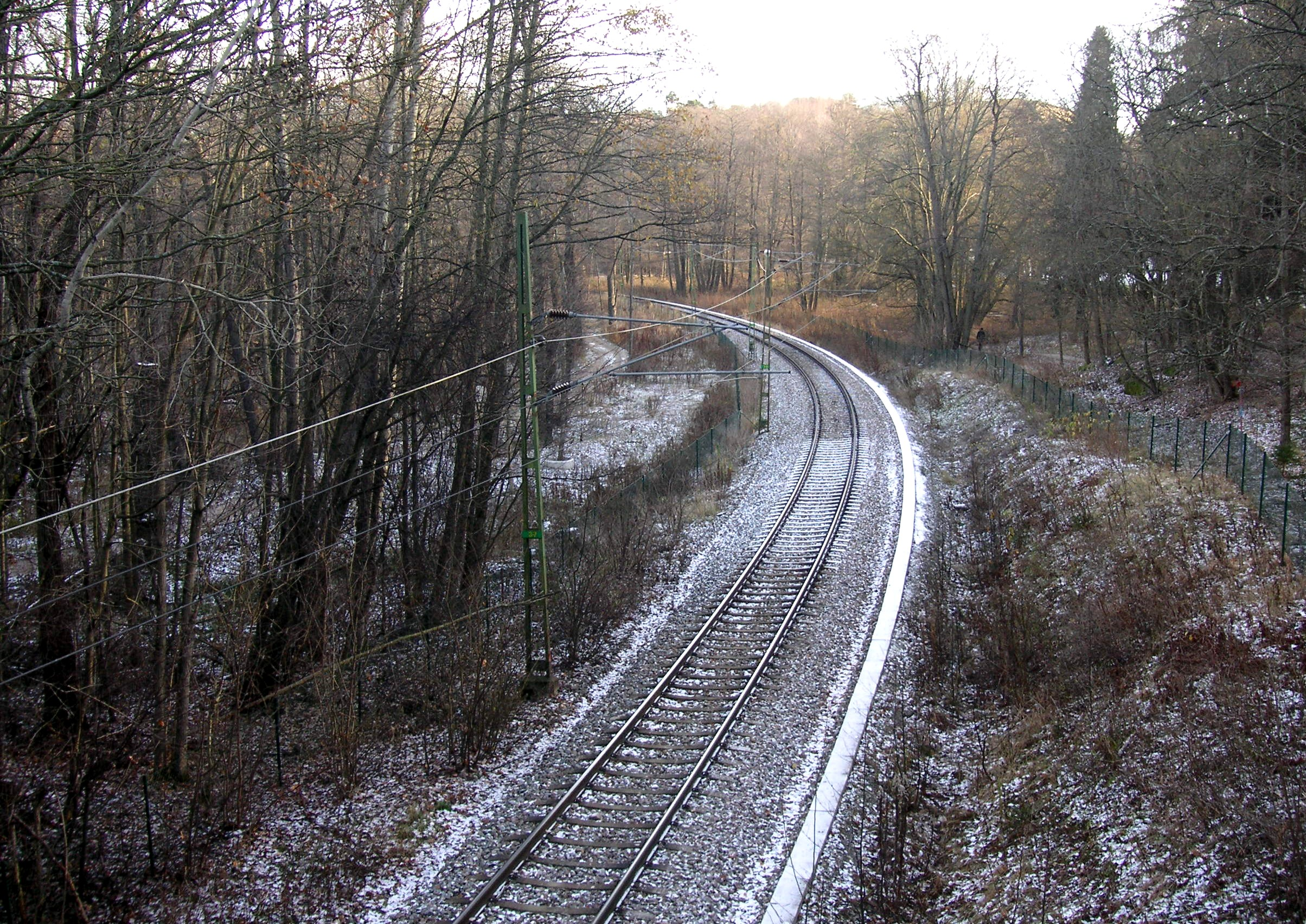
Värtabanan on Uggleviken

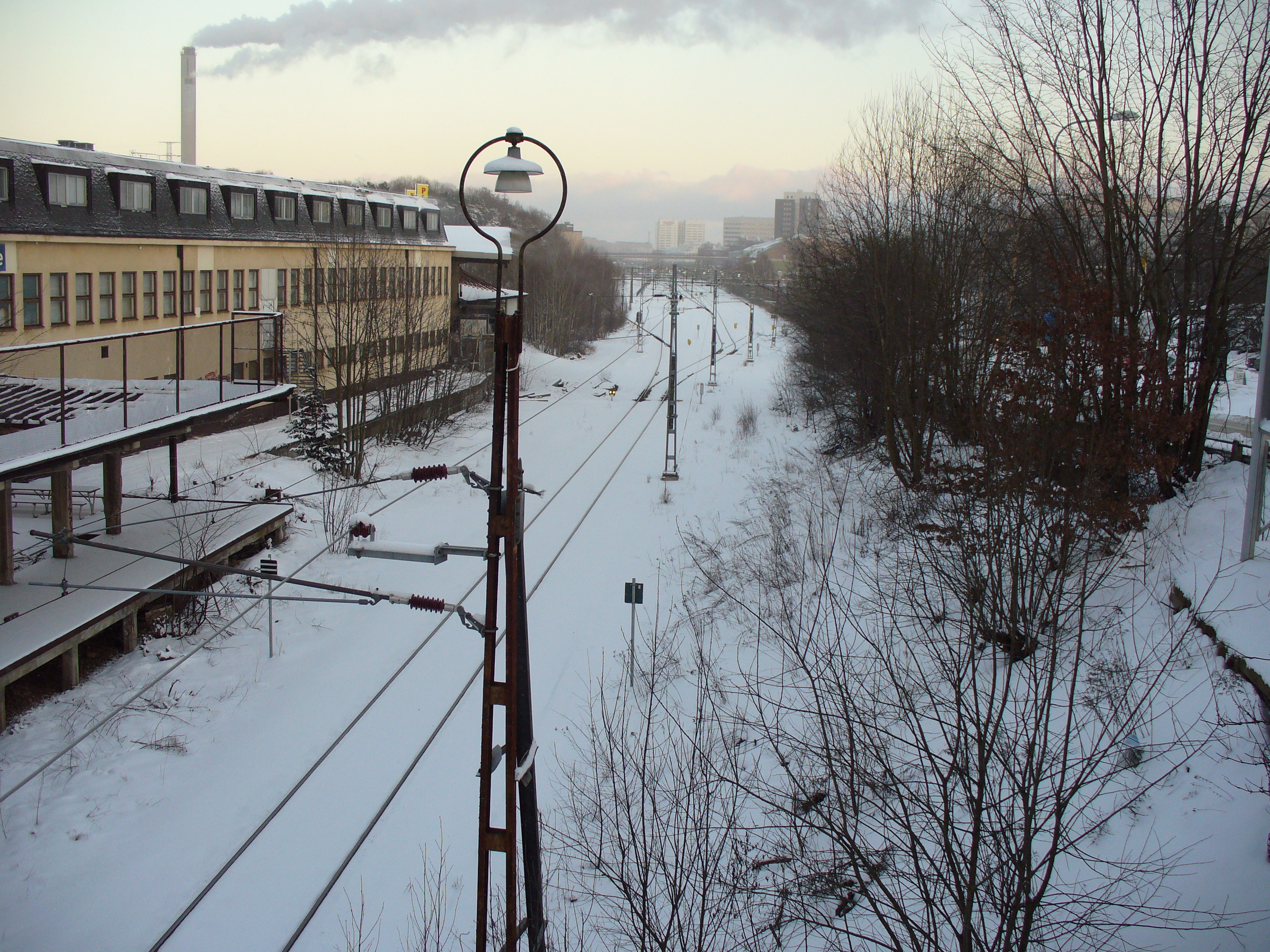
Värtabanan at Storängsbotten
