= Stockholm commuter rail =

Commuter rail system in Stockholm County, Sweden

Stockholm commuter rail Stockholms pendeltåg

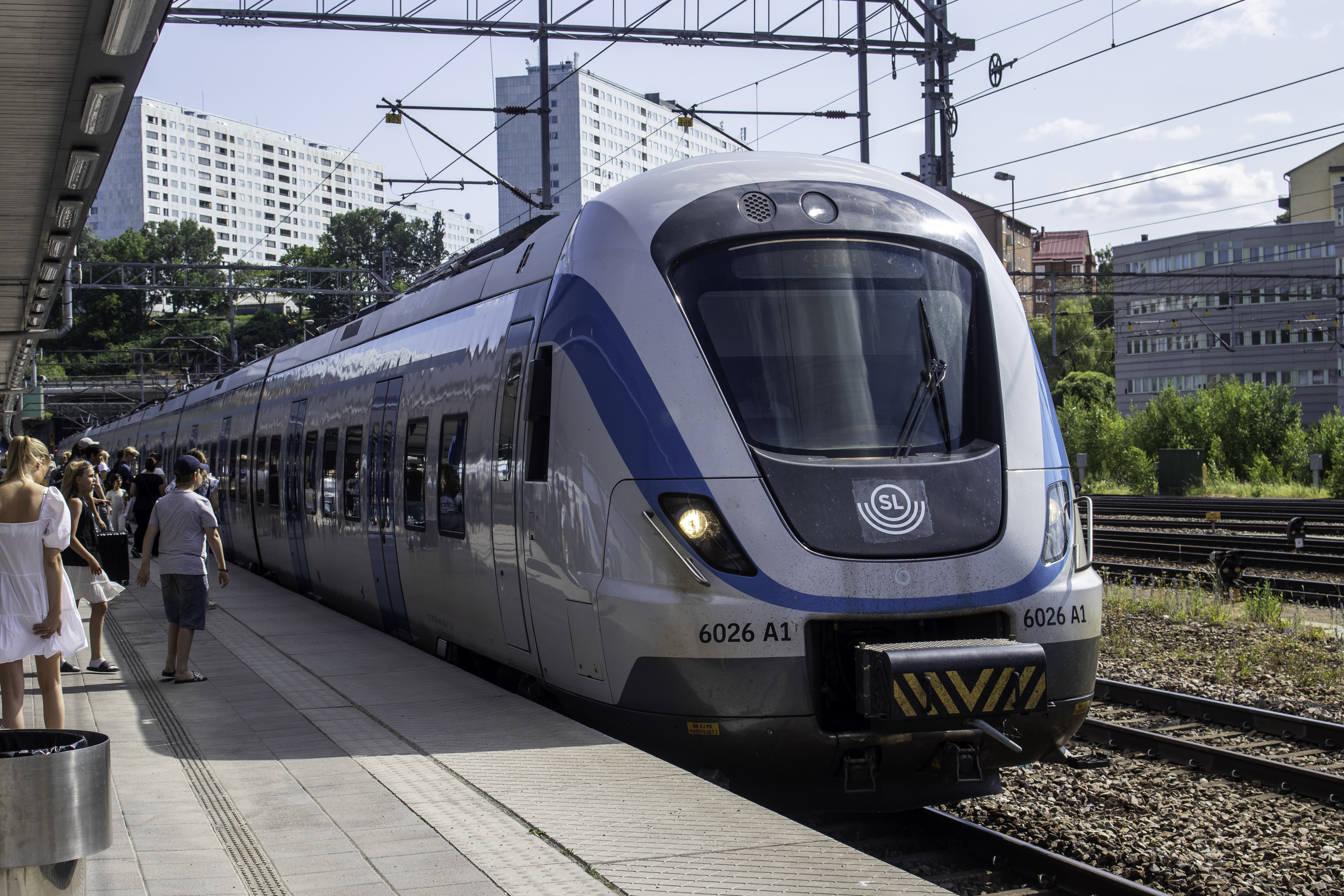
- An SL X60 Train at Solna railway station

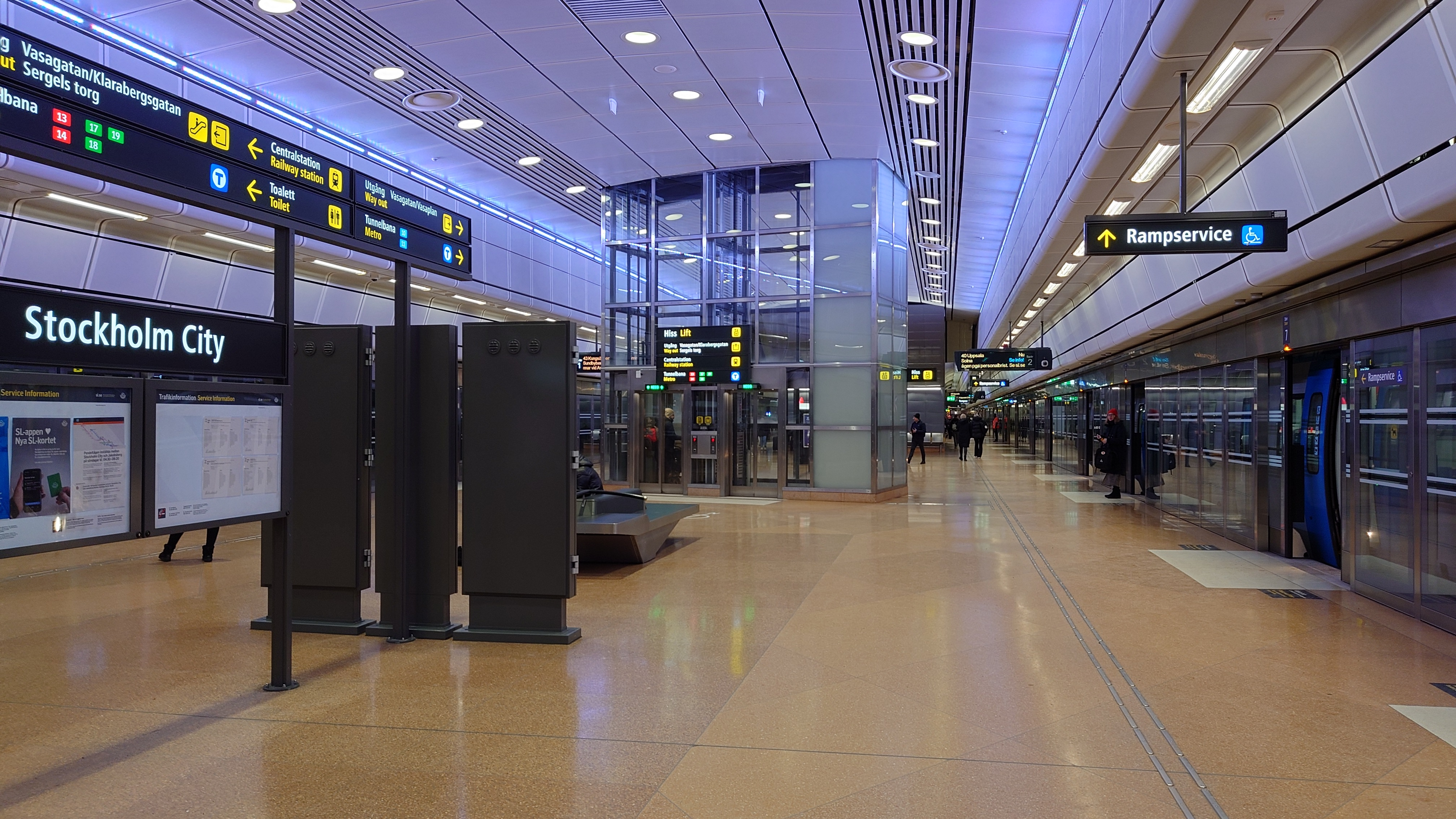
- Platforms at Stockholm City railway station

Overview
- Owner: Storstockholms Lokaltrafik / Swedish Transport Administration
- Locale: Stockholm County; Södermanland County; Uppsala County, Sweden
- Transit type: Commuter rail
- Number of lines: 7
- Number of stations: 53
- Daily ridership: 342,000 (weekday 2022)
- Annual ridership: 120 million (2019)

Operation
- Began operation: 22 April 1968
- Operator: SJ AB
- Train length: 107–214 metres (351–702 ft)
- Headway: 3-4 minutes (central section)

Technical
- System length: 241 km (150 mi)
- Track gauge: 1,435 mm (4 ft 8 1/2 in) standard gauge
- Electrification: 15 kV 16 2/3 Hz AC from overhead catenary
- Average speed: 60 km/h (40 mph)
- Top speed: 160 km/h (100 mph)

Stockholm commuter rail (Swedish: Stockholms pendeltåg) is the commuter rail system in Stockholm County, Sweden. The system is an important part of the public transport in Stockholm, and is controlled by Storstockholms Lokaltrafik. The tracks are state-owned and administered by the Swedish Transport Administration, while the operation of the Stockholm commuter rail services itself has been contracted to SJ AB since March 2024.

== History ==
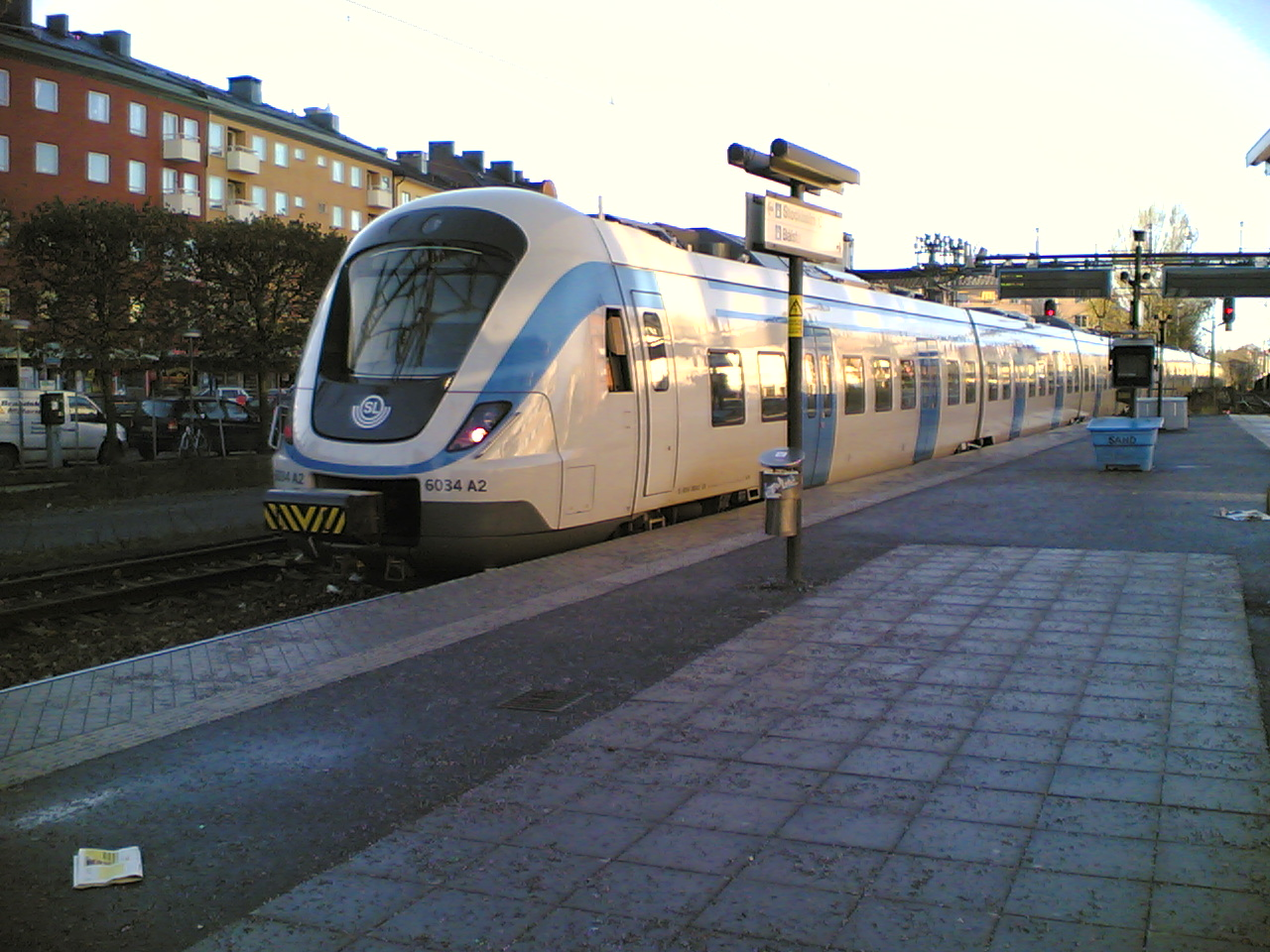
An X60 train in Sundbyberg

=== Initial operations and early routes ===
Local trains have been operated on the mainline railways around Stockholm since the late nineteenth century. At the beginning, local rail services were part of the Swedish State Railways, but in the late-1960s, the responsibility for these services was transferred to Stockholm County, which incorporated it with the ticketing system of Stockholm Transport. New trains were bought, stations were modernised, and the Stockholm commuter rail network was developed with an aim of making it more metro-like. Originally the system was branded as SL förortståg (English: SL suburban train), and later as SL lokaltåg (English: SL local/commuter train). Only in the 1980s did the system officially become known as Stockholms pendeltåg.

In its first year of operation there was only one route which went from Södertälje södra (now Södertälje hamn) to Kungsängen via Stockholm Central Station. On 1 June 1969, the system was extended to Märsta via a branch located after Karlberg railway station and a new service was created in which trains on the Kungsängen branch terminated at Stockholm C instead. In 1975 another branch line opened to Västerhaninge, with a single-track shuttle service to Nynäshamn. Trains on the Kungsängen branch now terminated at Västerhaninge instead of Stockholm C and which now forms part of the modern Line 43.

=== Upgrades and increased service frequencies ===
From 1986 until 1996, important improvements were made to the railways around Stockholm. Single-track stretches were upgraded to double tracks, and some double-track stretches were upgraded to four-track, allowing the commuter trains to run with less interference from other rail services. The service frequency was gradually increased, and from 2001 most stations on the network are served by trains at regular 15-minute intervals, with additional trains during rush hours.

In 2001, the northwestern arm of the network was extended from Kungsängen to Bålsta. A southern infill station at Årstaberg was inaugurated in 2006, in order to connect with the then new Tvärbanan tram system. A new station at Gröndalsviken opened on the southeastern Västerhaninge-Nynäshamn shuttle on 18 August 2008.

=== Connection with Arlanda Airport ===
Since 9 December 2012, it has been possible for Stockholm commuter rail trains to stop at Stockholm Arlanda Airport. Journeys take 38 minutes from Arlanda C station to Stockholm C, and 18 minutes from Arlanda C to Uppsala C. Discussions on the expansion began in December 2007. The airport has had express service from Stockholm Central through Arlanda Express since 1999, and was also reachable by bus from Märsta railway station. The implementation required negotiations between Stockholm Transport and Arlanda Express, who had operating rights for the tracks.

=== Stockholm City Line and new stations ===
A rail tunnel underneath central Stockholm began construction in 2008 and opened on 10 July 2017. This new tunnel, known as Stockholm City Line (Citybanan; lit. ‘the city line’), is intended for the exclusive use of the Pendeltåg system, and splits commuter traffic onto separate tracks from long-distance trains while travelling through the city. This eases the rail systems' congestion problems, and permits Stockholm Transport to schedule more frequent service. It also allows more frequent service for other trains, increasing the capacity for large parts of the Swedish rail network since many trains go to and from Stockholm. Two new underground stations, Stockholm City railway station (located under T-Centralen metro station, both stations with connections to Stockholm Central Station) and Stockholm Odenplan railway station; located under Odenplan metro station, replacing Karlberg railway station) were built as part of the Citybanan project.

A new station called Vega, located on the Nynäs Line in Haninge Municipality between Skogås and Handen stations, opened on 1 April 2019 after almost four years of construction. Vega was also the name of a small halt on the Nynäs Line which existed between 1929 and 1973, although it was built at a different location from the current Vega railway station.

=== Operational contractors ===
Operation of the Stockholm commuter rail lines has been contracted to private companies since 2000. The first franchise holder was Citypendeln, which operated the Stockholm commuter rail from 2000 until 17 June 2006. From 18 June 2006 until 10 December 2016, the network was operated by Stockholmståg, a subsidiary of SJ AB, the former Swedish State Railways company. On 11 December 2016, MTR Nordic took over the franchise on a ten-year contract, with an option to extend for a further four. In May 2023, SL decided not to extend MTR Nordic's contract to operate the Stockholm commuter rail beyond 2026, citing service delivery issues. On 1 November 2023, SL awarded an emergency contract to SJ AB, which took over operations from March 2024.

== Lines ==
Stockholm commuter rail network map

Line	Stretch	Travel time	Length	Stations
40	Uppsala C – Arlanda C – Stockholm City – Södertälje centrum	1:45		25
41	Märsta – Stockholm City – Södertälje centrum	1:24	74 km	24
43	Bålsta – Stockholm City – Nynäshamn	1:49	105 km	29
43X	Kallhäll – Stockholm City – Nynäshamn	1:25	84 km	21
48	Södertälje centrum – Gnesta	0:24	30 km	6
Entire commuter rail system			241 km	54

Since the introduction of the T25 timetable in December of 2024, there are three main services running north to south through central Stockholm on the network: Lines 40, 41 and 43, with 43 having express service during rush hour, skipping 4 stations south-east of Stockholm. The shorter Line 48 in the southwest connects Gnesta to Södertälje. Line 40 connects Uppsala C in the north to Södertälje in the southwest via Arlanda C, Upplands Väsby and Stockholm City railway station. The branch from Uppsala C to Upplands Väsby (where it joins line 41 to Södertälje) used by Line 40 utilises the existing infrastructure of the Arlanda Line and a part of the East Coast Line sharing tracks and platforms with regional and long distance trains.

The line to Nynäshamn beyond Hemfosa station consists of a single track with passing loops. Previously, short platforms and limited passing places meant that a change of train had to be made in Västerhaninge, but as of 2013 the line has been improved with longer platforms and additional loops, and all services are now run through central Stockholm and out towards Bålsta.

Trains start operating between 4 and 5 am every day, and run until midnight Sunday-Thursday nights and until 1:30am Friday and Saturday nights (Sat-Sun mornings). Lines 41 and 43, which cover a large majority of the network, run with 15-minute intervals during the daytime and 30-minute intervals in the early mornings and late evenings. Lines 40 and 48 run less frequently, typically every 30 minutes. Additional trains during rush hours give an average of 7 1/2 minutes intervals for many stations, and trains every 4 1/2 minutes on the central parts. Stations that are the furthest away from central Stockholm can have as little as one or two trains per hour in each direction, since some trains on lines 41 and 43 don't go the full length of their routes while some far-out stations are only served by lines 40 or 48, which run less frequently.

As of 2022, 342,000 passengers use Stockholm commuter trains on an ordinary weekday. This is more than half of the total number of daily train passengers in Sweden, the metro and trams not included.

== Stations ==
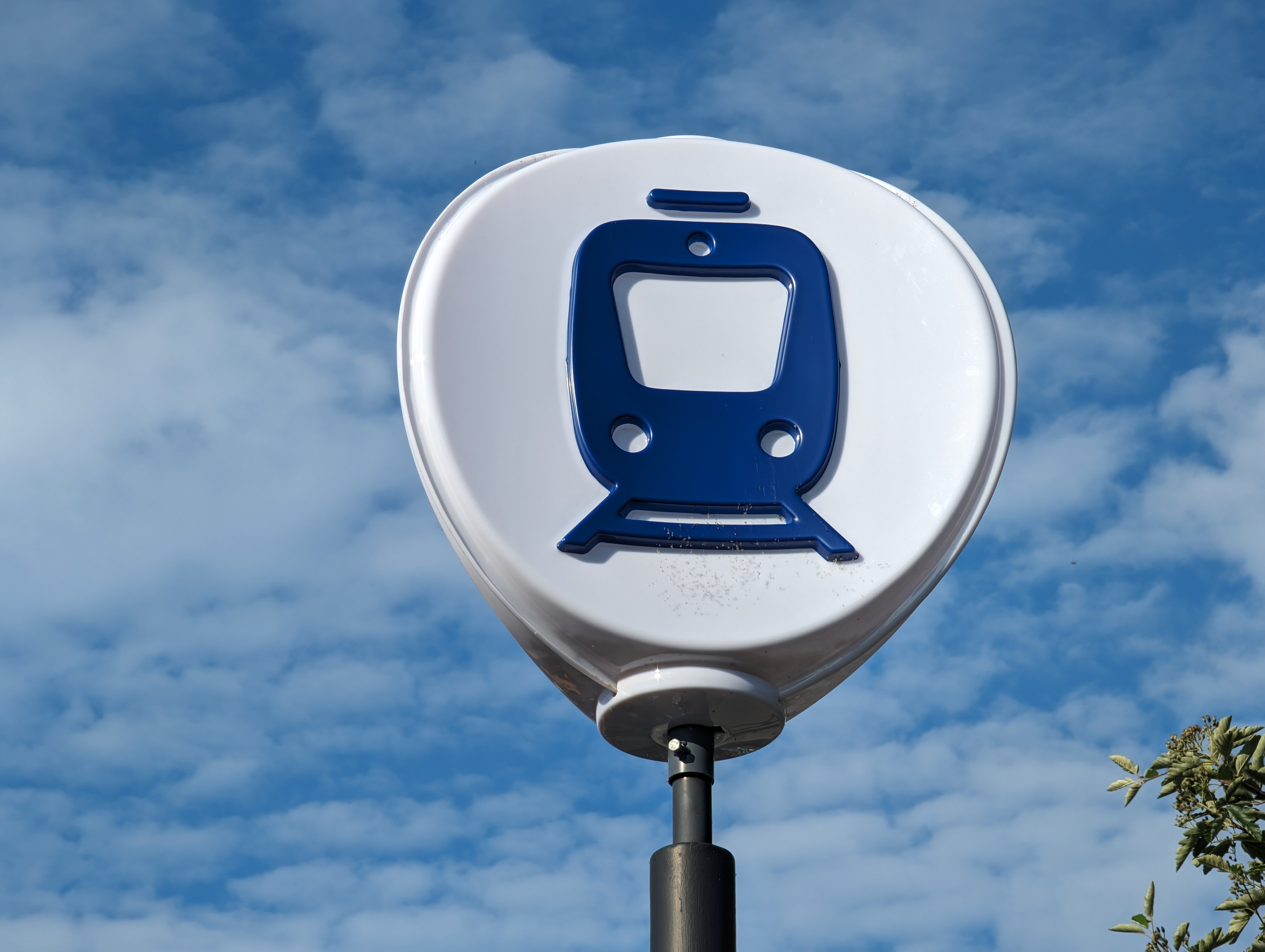
Pendeltåg sign in use since 2023

There are 53 stations in the network, four of which are beyond the borders of Stockholm County. Eight stations connect with regional and long-distance trains, three connect with the light-rail tram system Tvärbanan, and four stations have access to the Stockholm Metro. Several stations are important interchanges to local buses.

Most stations are of a similar style, with an island platform in a ground-level location with one or two exits, turnstiles, and a staffed ticket office. A few interchange stations have multiple platforms. The stations south of Västerhaninge and Södertälje are smaller, and have no ticket barriers. The least-used station is Hemfosa, which has approximately 100 boarding passengers per day.

Stockholm commuter rail logo

Since 2023, all stations have a symbol, displaying a train icon. Before that a blue capital letter "J" was used, in a style matching the Stockholm Metro's "T" signs.

== Rolling stock ==
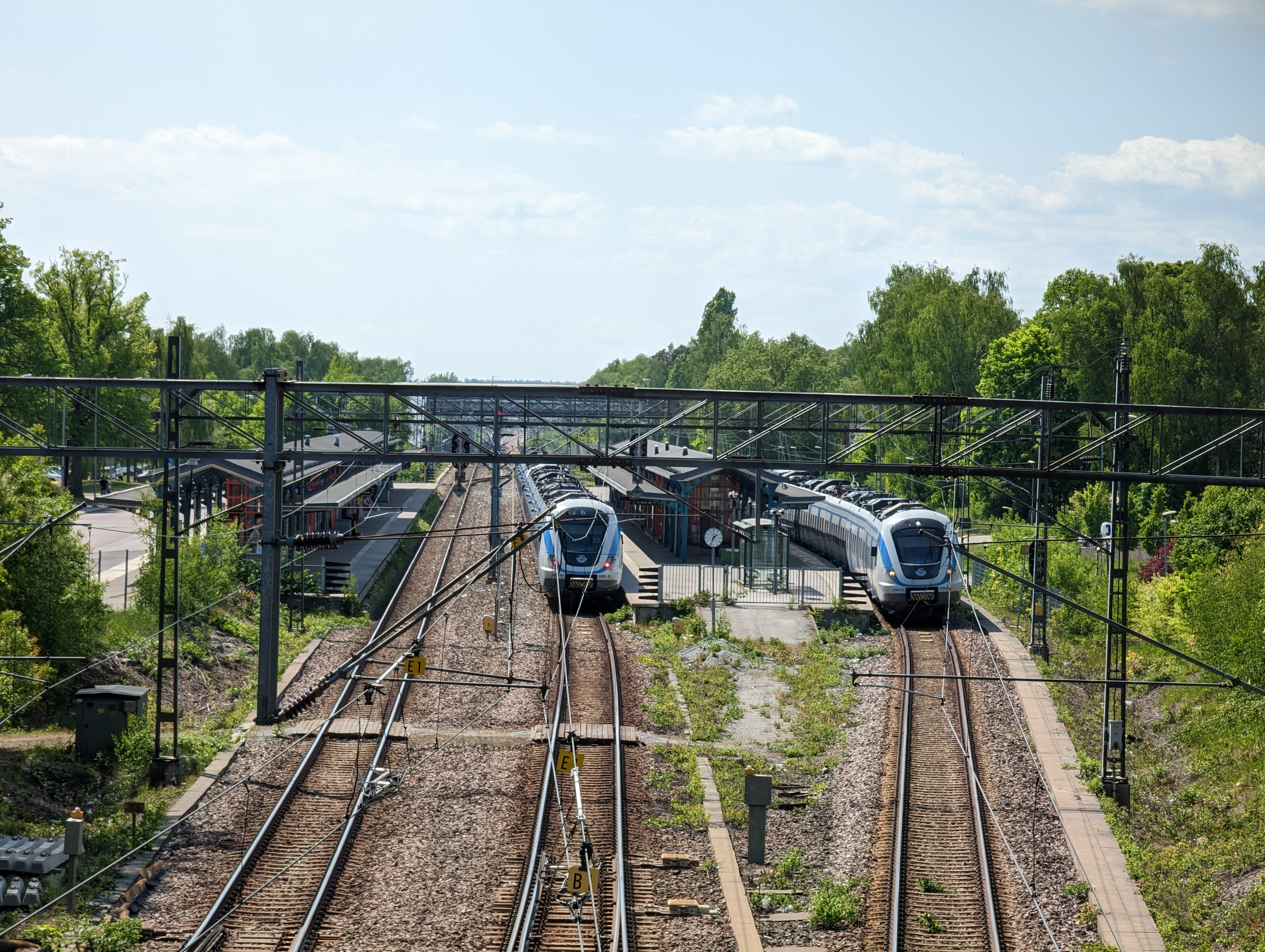
X60 trains at Västerhaninge

Since the opening of the Stockholm City Line (Citybanan) on 10 July 2017, only one train type, the X60 Coradia Nordic trains from Alstom is currently used on the network, due to the use of platform screen doors on the Citybanan. A total of 71 X60 trains were delivered between 2005 and 2008 to replace secondhand X420 trains previously operated by Deutsche Bahn in Germany, and which were imported into Sweden by the then-operator Citypendeln to temporarily increase capacity on the Pendeltåg network. A full-length train with two X60 units measures 214 metres (702 ft). In 2016, 46 trains of a new generation of the Coradia Nordic family called X60B entered service to replace the X10 trains originally delivered between 1983 and 1993. The maximum speed of the X60 and X60B trains is 160 km/h (100 mph).

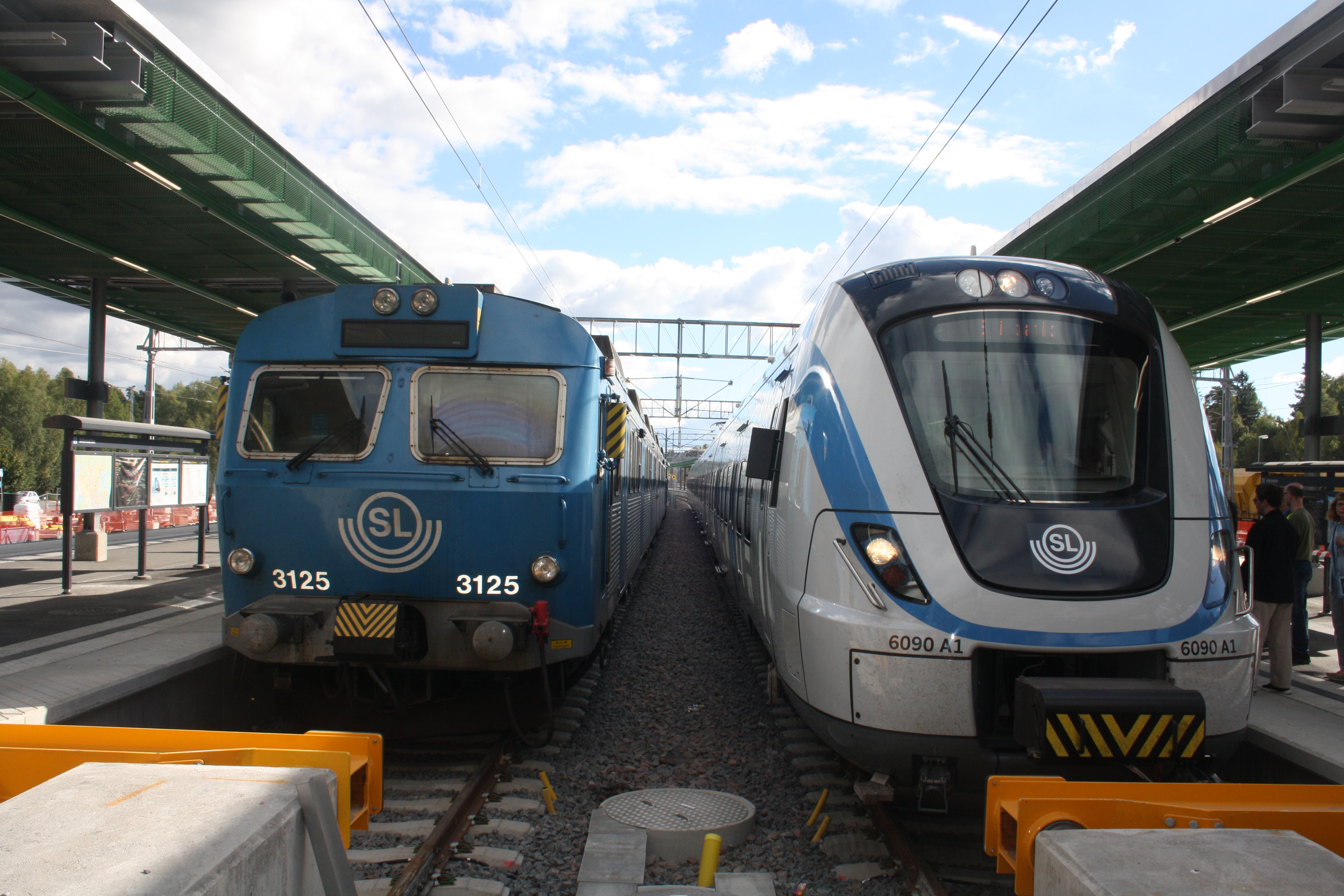
X10, now retired, next to an X60 in 2016

=== Former ===
- X1 (from 1968 until 2011)
- X10 (from 1983 until 2017)
- X20/X23 (from 2001 until 2002)
- DSB Bn passenger coaches hauled by SJ Rc locomotives (from 2001 until 2003)
- X420 (from 2002 until 2005)

== See also ==
- List of suburban and commuter rail systems
- Public transport in Stockholm
