= Tomteboda =

Coordinates: 59°21′N 18°01′E

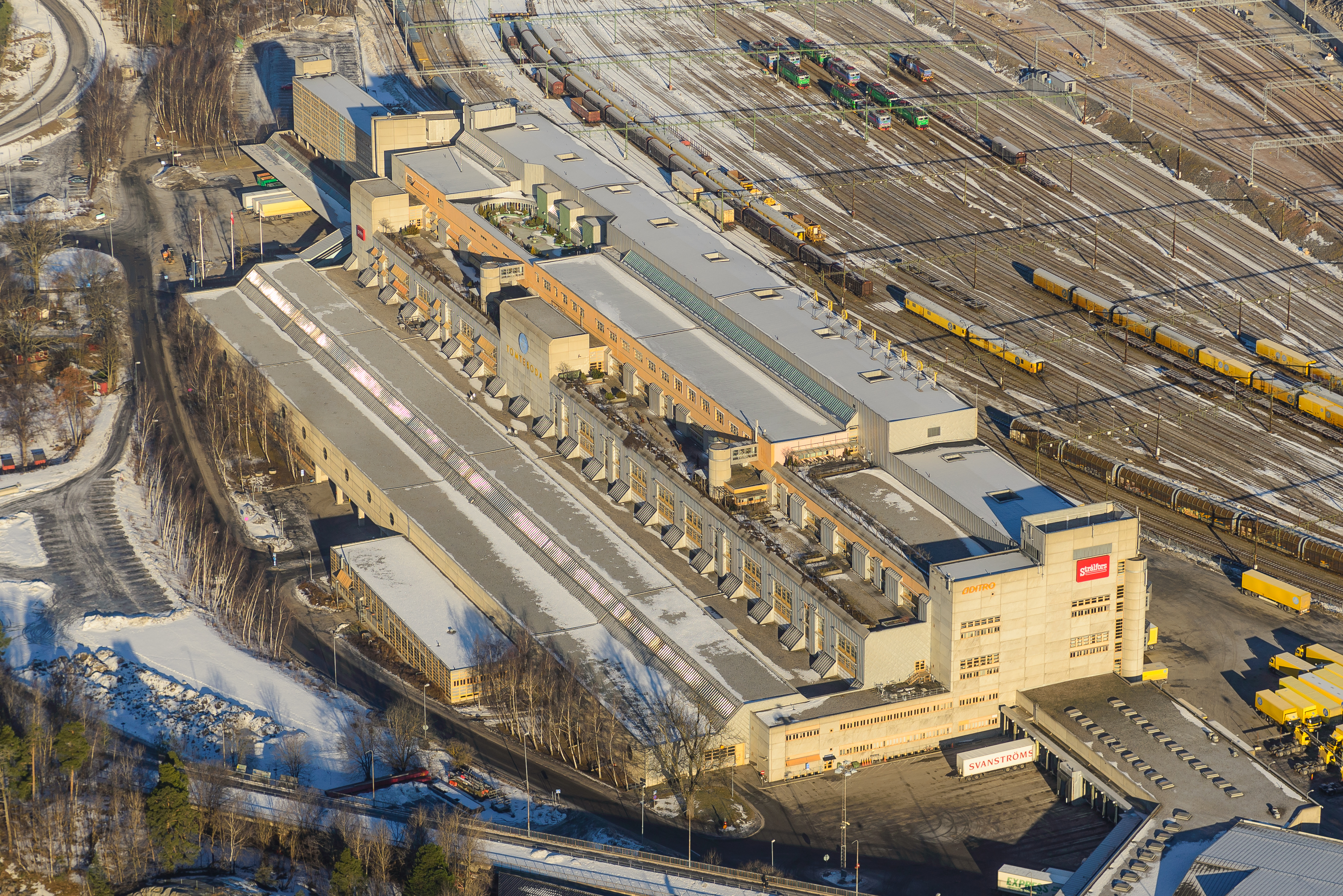
Tomteboda mail processing facility

Tomteboda is a place in northern Stockholm, Sweden, known for its mail terminal and its shunting yard. A new railway tunnel for commuters has been built between Stockholms södra railway station and Tomteboda.

== See also ==
- Stockholm commuter rail
- Swedish Railway Museum
