= City (Stockholm) =

Central business district of Stockholm, Sweden

City Stockholms city
- Central business district
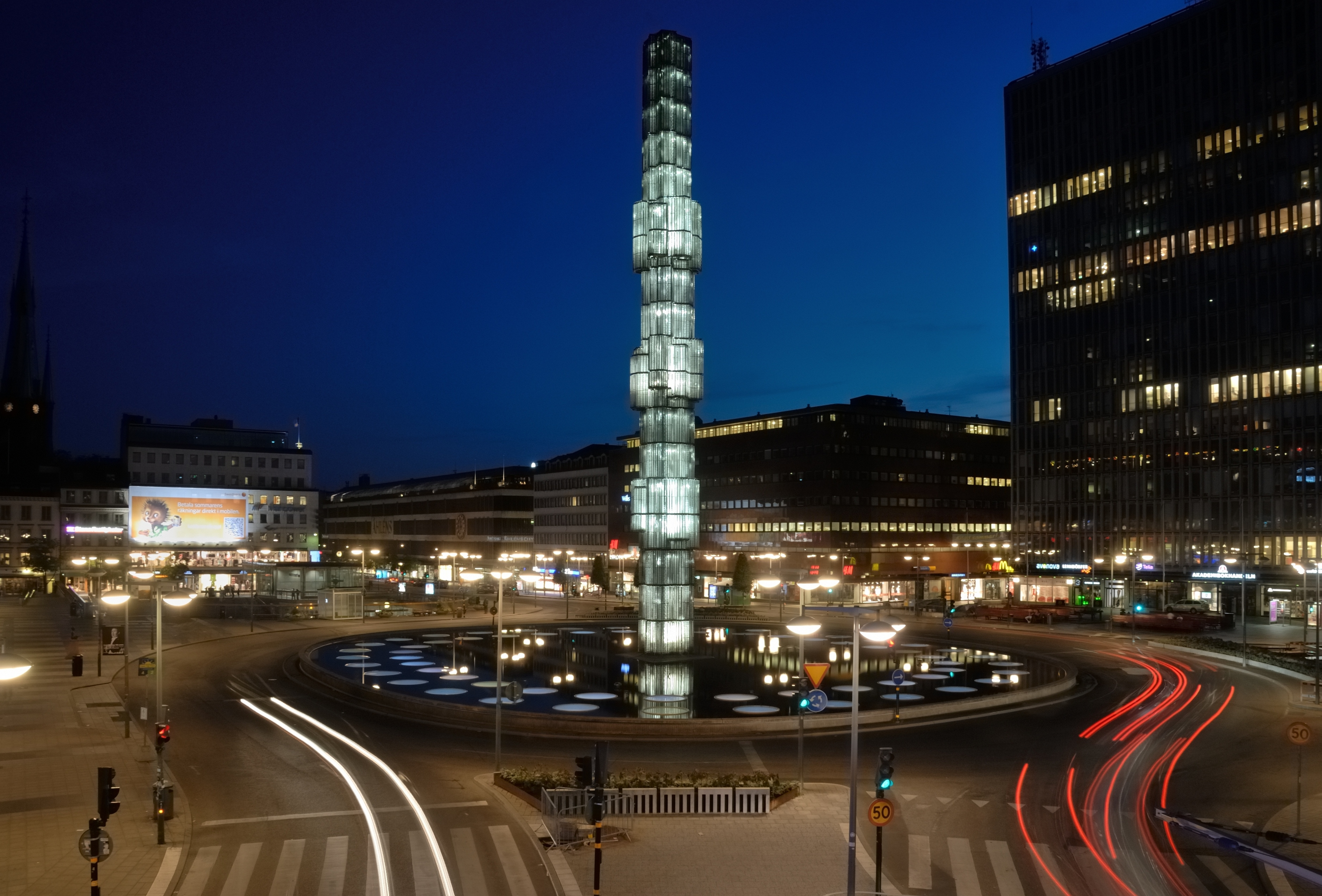
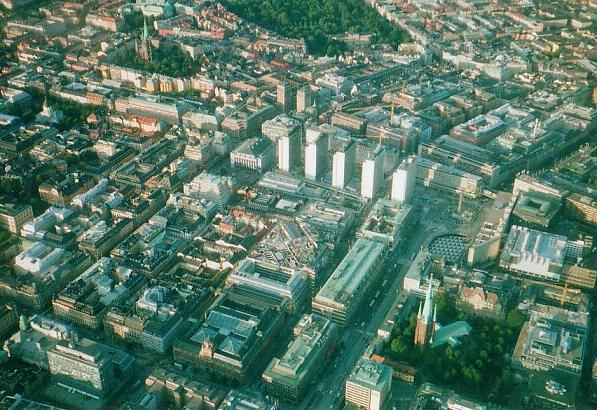
- Sergels Torg in the middle of City Aerial view of Stockholm City in 2001
- Country: Sweden
- County: Stockholm County
- Municipality: Stockholm Municipality
- District: Norrmalm

Population (2024)
  - Total: 2,147
- Former parishes of Klara and Jakob
- Time zone: UTC+1 (Central European Time)
  - Summer (DST): UTC+2 (Central European Summer Time)
- Postal codes: 10x xx
- Area code: 08
- Website: start.stockholm

City or Stockholm City (Swedish: Stockholms city) is the central commercial and business district of Stockholm, Sweden, located in the southern part of Norrmalm.

The area is not formally defined, but the term generally refers to Nedre Norrmalm (Lower Norrmalm), encompassing the former parishes of Klara and Jakob. Some municipal planning documents also include parts of neighbouring Östermalm.

Much of the district's present appearance is the result of the Norrmalm redevelopment (Norrmalmsregleringen), a large-scale urban renewal programme carried out during the 1950s and 1960s. The redevelopment replaced much of the historic Klarakvarteren neighbourhood with modern office buildings, commercial properties and public spaces.

In 2024, the former parishes of Klara and Jakob had a combined population of 2,147 inhabitants, while the wider Norrmalm district had 8,643 inhabitants.

== Name ==
The Swedish term city derives from the English word used to describe a central business district. Its use in Stockholm was inspired by the City of London, the historic commercial centre of London. The Municipality of Stockholm uses the English name City of Stockholm for the municipality as a whole.

== Geography ==
Stockholm City is generally associated with Lower Norrmalm and the former parishes of Klara and Jakob. Its approximate boundaries extend from Tegelbacken in the south to Hötorget in the north, and from the area around Stockholm Central Station in the west to Kungsträdgården in the east.

The boundaries vary between municipal planning documents. The 1962 city plan (City 62) also included certain parts of eastern Norrmalm, south of Humlegårdsgatan and west of Sibyllegatan.

== History ==
The modern development of Stockholm City was largely shaped by the Norrmalm redevelopment, which transformed Lower Norrmalm during the post-war period. Large parts of the historic Klarakvarteren neighbourhood were demolished and replaced with modern buildings, offices, shops and public infrastructure.

The buildings constructed between the 1960s and 1980s reflected the modernist architectural and urban planning ideals of the period. Many featured expensive construction materials and ambitious designs. According to the Stockholm City Museum, the buildings have subsequently been subject to considerable pressure for redevelopment and alteration.

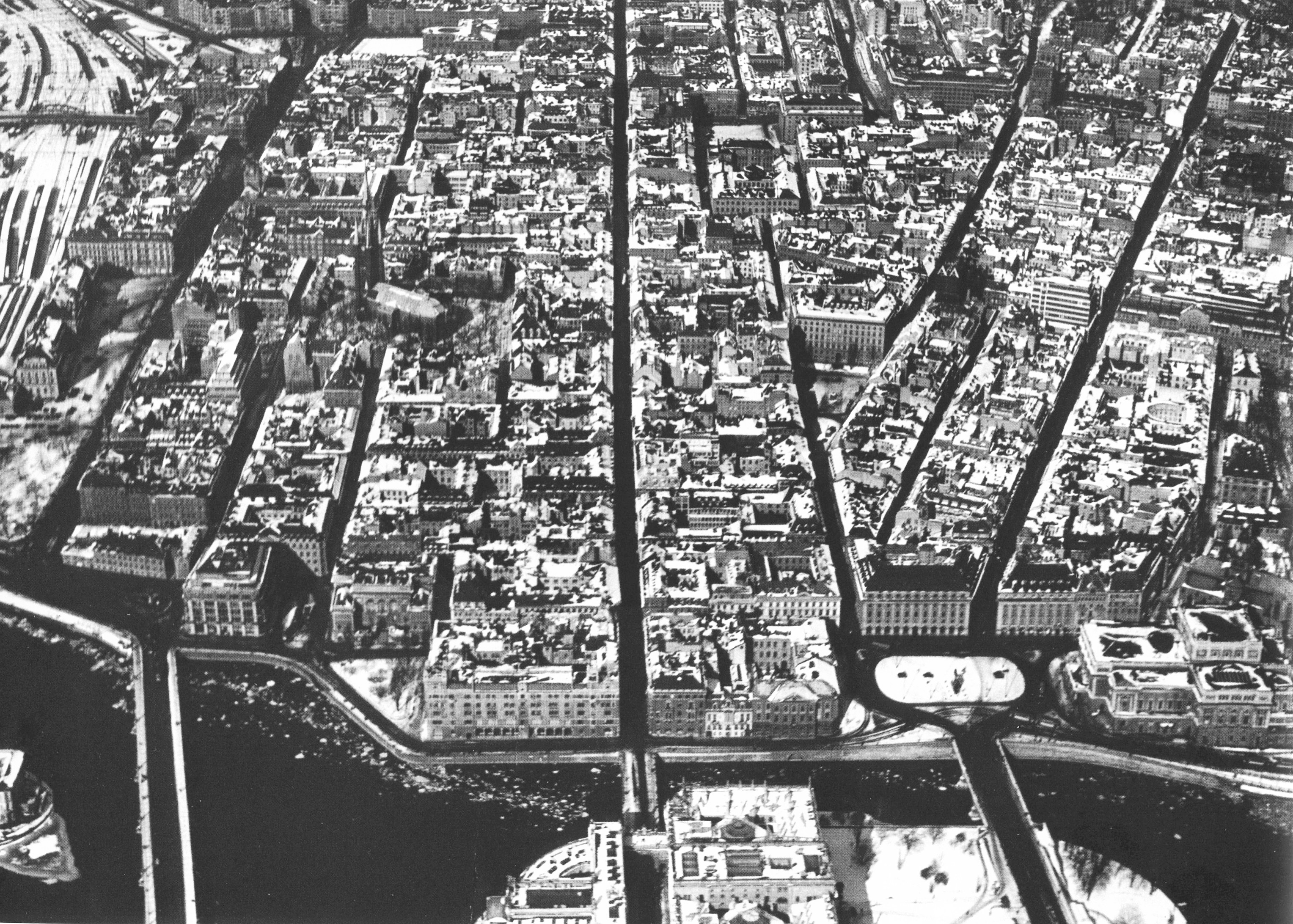
Nedre Norrmalm before redevelopment

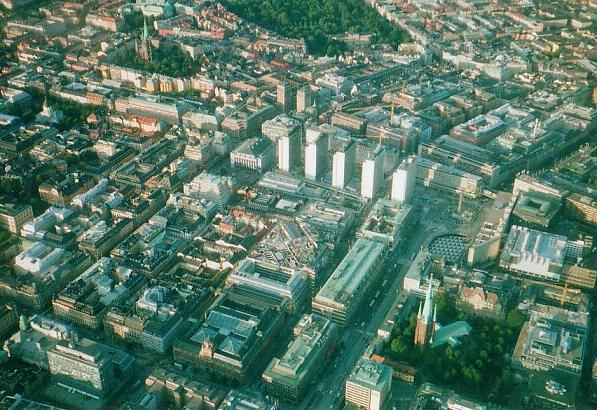
After redevelopment

== Transport ==
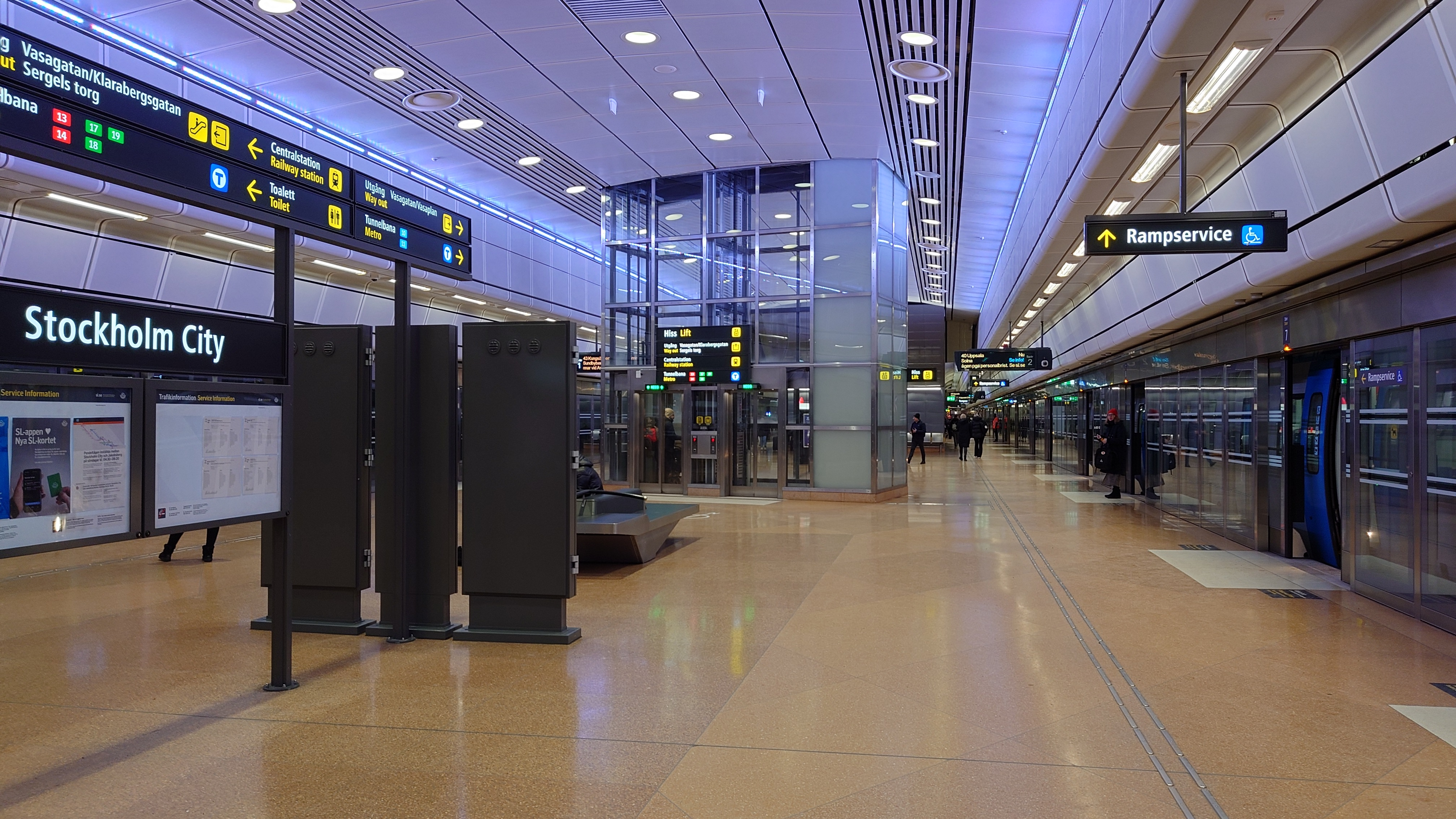
Stockholm City commuter railway station

Stockholm City is a major public transport hub. The area is served by:

- Stockholm Central Station
- Stockholm City Station (named after this area)
- T-Centralen metro station
- Hötorget metro station
- Kungsträdgården metro station
- Östermalmstorg metro station
- Several stops on Spårväg City

== Buildings and places ==
Notable buildings and locations in Stockholm City include:

- Sergels torg
- Hötorget
- Hötorgsskraporna
- Stockholm Concert Hall
- Kulturhuset
- Gallerian
- Stureplan
- Norrmalmstorg
- Humlegården
- Klara Church
- Adolf Fredrik Church
- Saint John's Church, Stockholm
- Stockholm Waterfront
- Riksbank
- Sheraton Stockholm Hotel
