= X61 (railcar) =

Electric multiple-unit train

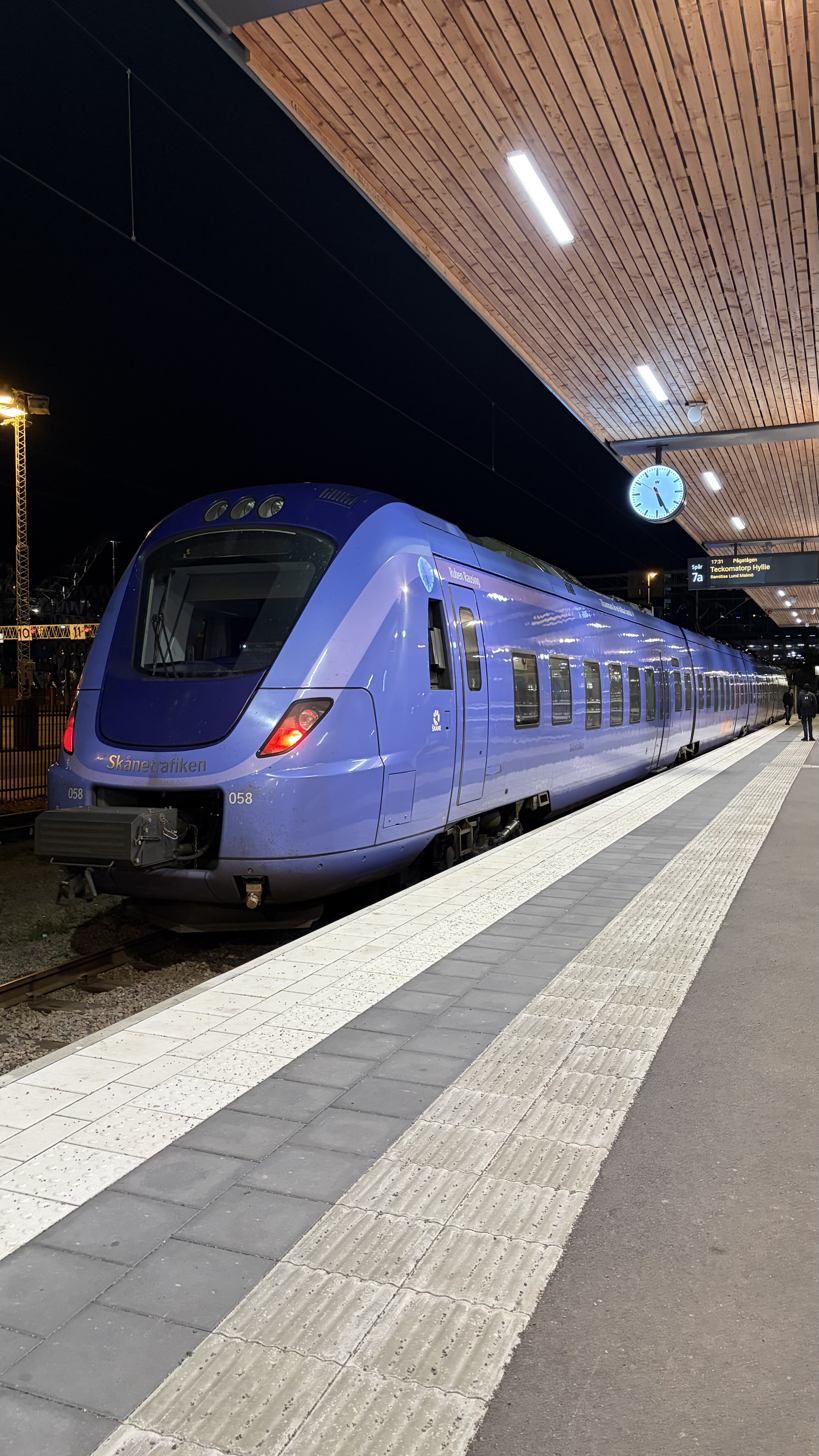
- A Skånetrafiken X61 at Helsingborg Central station in 2025.
- Stock type: Electric multiple unit
- In service: 16 August 2010–
- Manufacturer: Alstom
- Assembly: Salzgitter, Germany
- Family name: Alstom Coradia
- Replaced: X11, X14
- Constructed: 2009–
- Number built: 140
- Capacity: 234, Skånetrafiken
- Operators: Skånetrafiken; Västtrafik; Östgötatrafiken; Transitio

Specifications
- Train length: 74 metres (243 ft)
- Width: 3,560 millimetres (11.68 ft)
- Doors: 5 pairs 1-1-2-1
- Maximum speed: 160 km/h (100 mph)
- Current collection: Pantograph
- UIC classification: Bo'(Bo')(2')(Bo')Bo'
- Track gauge: 1,435 mm (4 ft 8 1/2 in) standard gauge

X61 is an electric multiple unit built by Alstom as a part of the Alstom Coradia Nordic family. The trains are a shortened version of the X60, with four instead of six cars.

== Operators ==
=== Skånetrafiken ===
Skånetrafiken ordered 49 X61 as a replacement for the aging X11 in use on the Pågatågen services. The first trains were ordered at a cost of 48 million SEK per trainset. Along with the order came options for additional 59 units, 20 of these options were used in 2011 and in 2015 a further 30 sets were ordered. In January 2019 the final 19 sets from this order were delivered. In 2013 all services ran using the X61 with some services being two or three sets long.

=== Östgötatrafiken ===
As of 2015 all Östgötapendeln services run with the X61, a total of 18 trains were ordered at three different times (2008, 2012 och 2017) as replacement for their 14 X14 which were retired as early as 2010 when the first of the 2008 ordered trains arrived.

=== Västtrafik ===
In December 2008 Västtrafik ordered 11 units to be leased from Transitio They are used on Gothenburg commuter rail with start 15 October 2012. The order was doubled in october of 2010 when a further 11 were ordered.

=== Transitio ===
Transitio is a train leasing company owned by the regions of Sweden. ordered total of 23 Alstom Coradia Nordic trains in 2008. the order was split between X61 and X62. 11 of the X61 were leased to Västtrafik with Transitio retaining one as a spare in case of a breakdown.
