= 2003 Svenska Cupen =

Tournament details
- Country: Sweden
- Teams: 98

Final positions
- Champions: IF Elfsborg
- Runners-up: Assyriska Föreningen

Tournament statistics
- Matches played: 97

The 2003 Svenska Cupen was the 48th season of the main Swedish football Cup. The competition started on 27 March 2003 and concluded on 1 November 2003 with the final, held at Råsunda Stadium, Solna Municipality in Stockholm County. IF Elfsborg won the final 2–0 against Assyriska Föreningen.

== First round ==
There were 34 matches played between 27 March and 18 April 2003. There were 68 teams in the first round from Division 1, Division 2 and Division 3, but also including a few teams from Division 4 and Division 5.

Team 1	Score	Team 2
27 March 2003
Enskede IK	1–3	Valsta Syrianska IK
30 March 2003
Hamre MM	1–5	Degerfors IF
1 April 2003
Nässjö FF	0–1 (aet)	Linköpings FF
6 April 2003
Bälinge IF	2–3	BK Forward
8 April 2003
IFK Trollhättan	0–2	Qviding FIF
Eneby BK	1–2	IFK Ölme
IFK Lidingö FK	0–2	Vallentuna BK
9 April 2003
Rydboholms SK	0–10	IFK Värnamo
IFK Mora FK	1–3	Ytterhogdals IK
12 April 2003
Gagnefs IF	0–5	Gestrike-Hammarby IF
Husqvarna FF	2–0	Hjulsbro IK
Bjärreds IF	0–8	Myresjö IF
IFK Sundsvall	6–2	Robertsfors IK
Smedby BoIK	1–4	Kristianstads FF
Snöstorp Nyhem FF	0–1	Växjö BK
Trönninge IF	1–3	Åkarps IF
Bara GoIF	2–3 (aet)	Ljungby IF
Skövde AIK	0–4	FC Trollhättan
Fårösund GoIK	2–3	Topkapi IK
Sörfors IF	1–2 (aet)	IFK Luleå
AIK Atlas	0–7	Ystads IF FF
Kulladals FF	2–3	IFK Hässleholm
Gerdskens BK	1–0	Jonsereds IF
IFK Åmål	0–1	Floda BoIF
Älekulla IF	0–9	GAIS
13 April 2003
Hudiksvalls ABK	0–6	Friska Viljor FC
IFK Skövde FK	0–2	Skärhamns IK
Östra Ryds IF	3–5	Oxelösunds IK
Kolsva IF	2–4	Carlstad United BK
Rådhuset FC	0–6	Väsby IK
Hargs BK	0–4	Vasalund/Essinge IF
14 April 2003
Nyköpings BIS	1–3	Rynninge IK
Helsingborgs Södra	0–1	Höllvikens GIF
18 April 2003
Arameiska-Syrianska	1–3	Spårvägens FF

== Second round ==
In this round the 34 winning teams from the previous round were joined by 30 teams from Allsvenskan and Superettan. The 32 matches were played between 29 April and 7 May 2003.

Team 1	Score	Team 2
29 April 2003
Höllvikens GIF	0–4	BK Häcken
Ljungby IF	0–0 (aet); 5–4 (p)	Ängelholms FF
IFK Ölme	0–1	Enköpings SK FK
IFK Luleå	3–0	Mjällby AIF
GAIS	2–1	IK Brage
Topkapi IK	1–6	Gefle IF
30 April 2003
Skärhamns IK	2–1	Vasalund/Essinge IF
BK Forward	0–1 (aet)	Helsingborgs IF
Rynninge IK	3–0	Västra Frölunda IF
Floda BoIF	1–9	Örgryte IS
IFK Sundsvall	0–7	Assyriska Föreningen
1 May 2003
Spårvägens FF	1–2	Halmstads BK
Vallentuna BK	1–2	Örebro SK
Valsta Syrianska IK	1–2	Kalmar FF
Kristianstads FF	0–1	IFK Norrköping
Qviding FIF	2–0	Landskrona BoIS
Åkarps IF	1–8	Östers IF
Gestrike-Hammarby IF	2–3 (aet)	IF Brommapojkarna
FC Trollhättan	0–0 (aet); 3–5 (p)	FC Café Opera United
Ytterhogdals IK	0–5	Hammarby IF
Ystads IF FF	0–6	GIF Sundsvall
Friska Viljor FC	0–1	IFK Göteborg
Gerdskens BK	0–4	IF Elfsborg
IFK Värnamo	1–2	Västerås SK FK
Myresjö IF	3–1	IF Sylvia
Husqvarna FF	1–2 (aet)	Malmö FF
Linköpings FF	1–2 (aet)	Degerfors IF
Växjö BK	4–5 (aet)	IFK Malmö FK
IFK Hässleholm	1–2	Trelleborgs FF
2 May 2003
Oxelösunds IK	0–7	Djurgårdens IF
7 May 2003
Väsby IK	4–1	Åtvidabergs FF
Carlstad United BK	1–4	AIK

== Third round ==
The 16 matches in this round were played between 20 May and 5 June 2003.

Team 1	Score	Team 2
20 May 2003
Ljungby IF	1–5	IF Elfsborg
Rynninge IK	1–2	Skärhamns IK
23 May 2003
Örgryte IS	3–0	Helsingborgs IF
28 May 2003
GAIS	2–3	Kalmar FF
Väsby IK	3–0	FC Café Opera United
Östers IF	3–1	Västerås SK FK
Degerfors IF	1–2 (aet)	Örebro SK
29 May 2003
AIK	2–0	BK Häcken
Qviding FIF	1–3	Trelleborgs FF
IFK Luleå	0–4	Malmö FF
Myresjö IF	0–1	Assyriska Föreningen
Gefle IF	0–6	Djurgårdens IF
IFK Norrköping	1–0	IF Brommapojkarna
IFK Göteborg	3–2	IFK Malmö FK
4 June 2003
GIF Sundsvall	2–1 (aet)	Hammarby IF
5 June 2003
Enköpings SK FK	1–2 (aet)	Halmstads BK

== Fourth round ==
The 8 matches in this round were played between 18 June and 7 August 2003.

Team 1	Score	Team 2
18 June 2003
Väsby IK	1–0	GIF Sundsvall
25 June 2003
Trelleborgs FF	3–1	Kalmar FF
26 June 2003
AIK	3–0	Östers IF
IFK Göteborg	2–0	IFK Norrköping
Skärhamns IK	2–4	IF Elfsborg
Malmö FF	0–4	Djurgårdens IF
9 July 2003
Örebro SK	2–3 (aet)	Assyriska Föreningen
7 August 2003
Halmstads BK	2–1	Örgryte IS

== Quarter-finals ==
The 4 matches in this round were played between 7 August and 2 October 2003.

Team 1	Score	Team 2
7 August 2003
Väsby IK	1–4	IF Elfsborg
Assyriska Föreningen	4–1	IFK Göteborg
28 August 2003
Halmstads BK	2–1	Trelleborgs FF
2 October 2003
Djurgårdens IF	2–1 (aet)	AIK

== Semi-finals ==
The semi-finals were played on 25 September and 16 October 2003.

Team 1	Score	Team 2
25 September 2003
Halmstads BK	0–4	IF Elfsborg
16 October 2003
Djurgårdens IF	0–4	Assyriska Föreningen

== Final ==
The final was played on 1 November 2003 at the Råsunda Stadium.

1 November 2003
19:00

IF Elfsborg	2–0	Assyriska Föreningen
Nilsson 4', 67'	Report

Råsunda, Solna
Attendance: 10,280
Referee: Miro Ukalovic (Hisings Kärra)
