= X12 =

X12 or X-12 may refer to:

- X12 (New York City bus)
- ASC X12, the standard for the development and maintenance of Electronic Data Interchange standards for the United States
- Convair X-12, an advanced testbed for the Atlas rocket program
- Cummins X12, a diesel engine
- SJ X12, a Swedish train
- X-12-ARIMA, software for seasonal adjustment of time series data
