= SL X10 =

Swedish suburban electric train

X10
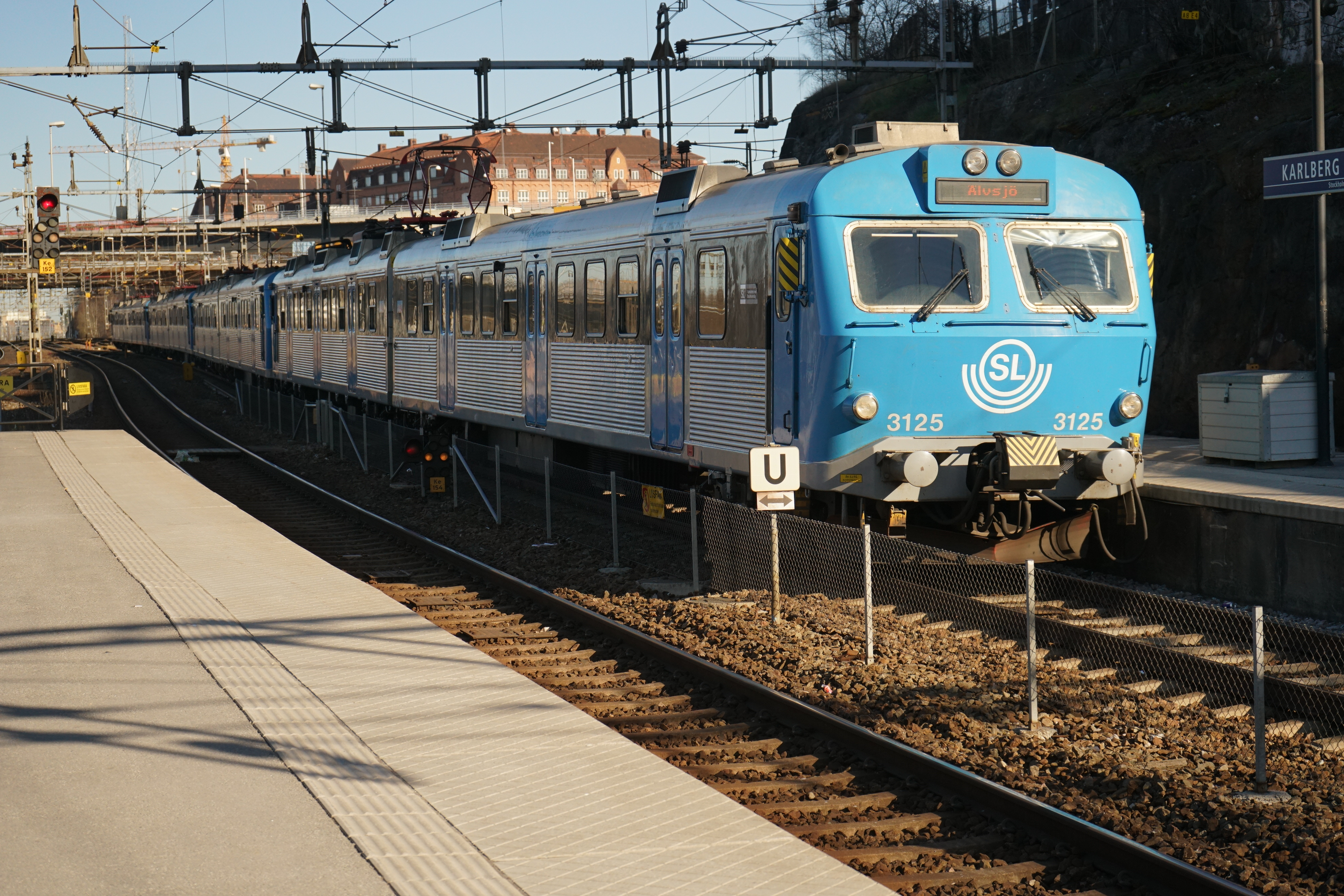
- X10 arriving at Karlberg railway station

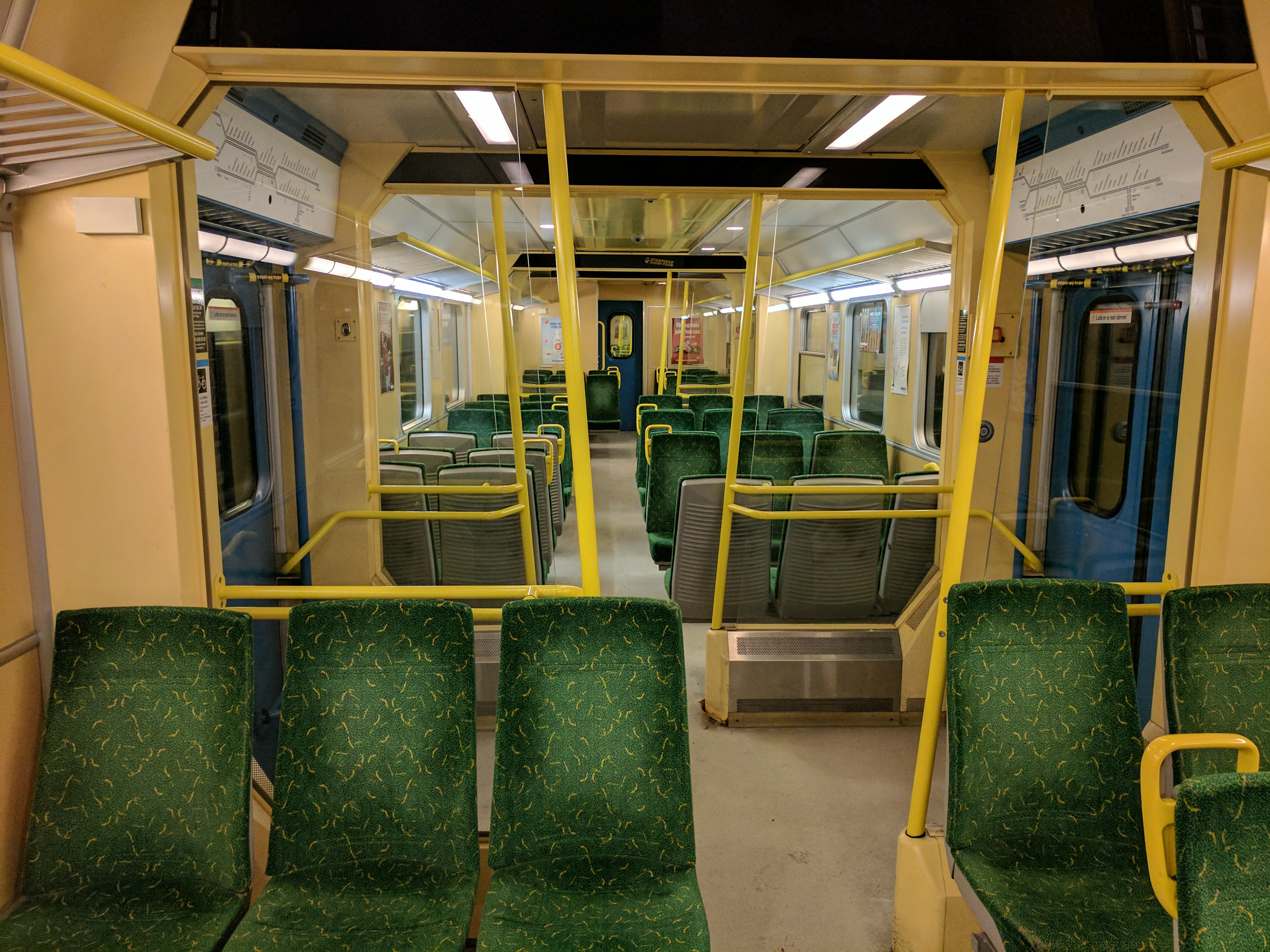
- Stock type: Elecric multiple unit
- In service: 1982–2017 (SL); 1982–1996 (Länstrafiken Malmöhus); 1980s–1998 (GL); 1980s–2000s (X-Trafik); 1980s–1990s (VL); 1980s–1990s (UL); 2017–2018 (Saga Rail); 2017– (Tågab)
- Manufacturer: ASEA
- Replaced: 2016–2017 (SL)
- Constructed: 1982–1993
- Entered service: 1982
- Refurbished: 1998–2002 (SL)
- Scrapped: 2017–2024
- Number built: 101 units
- Number in service: 2 units
- Formation: 2 cars
- Fleet numbers: 3114-3133, 3148-3166, 3176-3181, 3186, 3198-3203 (SL)
- Capacity: 184 (SL); 166 (X-trafik); 120 (VL)
- Operator: Tågab
- Line served: Stockholm commuter rail (Former)

Specifications
- Train length: 49,868 mm (163 ft 7 1/4 in) (2 cars)
- Width: 49,868 millimetres (163 ft 7.3 in)
- Doors: Three per side
- Maximum speed: 140 km/h (90 mph)
- Weight: 100 t (98 long tons; 110 short tons) (X10); 103 t (101 long tons; 114 short tons) (X11)
- Power output: 1,280 kW (1,720 hp)
- Electric system: 15 kV 16.7 Hz AC catenary
- Current collection: Pantograph
- Safety system: ATC-2
- Track gauge: 1,435 mm (4 ft 8 1/2 in)

X10 is a series of two-car electric multiple units which was formerly operated by Greater Stockholm Transport (SL) on the Stockholm commuter rail between 1983 and 2017, when the City Line project made them incompatible with the X60 train sets. The X10 was operated in sets of up to five twin units, making ten-car trains, each unit consisting of one motor car and one unpowered car. They were completely compatible with the X1 introduced in the 1960s. 101 units were built by ASEA between 1982 and 1993.

Between 1993 and 1999, 49 X10 units were rebuilt to X11 for the Skåne Commuter Rail and the Gothenburg Commuter Rail. They have a different interior more suitable for regional traffic and are slightly heavier and have toilets (X10 don't have them since most SL stations have toilets). From 1999 only 52 X10 remained and all of them belonged to Storstockholms Lokaltrafik (SL). They were refurbished with new interiors and repainted between 1998 and 2002

Two other variants are X12 and X14 which can reach a top speed of 160 km/h. The X12 has a 1st class section while X11 and X14 only has 2nd class. 18 X12 were built and 18 X14 plus two that have been rebuilt from X12 to X14. They have been used for various regional traffic in southern Sweden.

During the early 1990s, the Norwegian State Railways borrowed X10 units during the summer to operate on the Flåm Line. This was in part because they wanted to use the X10's larger windows for the tourist route.

In 2017, 43 of the 52 X10 units were transported to Hallstahammar to be scrapped. They could no longer be used in Stockholm anymore because of platform screen doors installed on the Citybanan demanding all trains to have doors placed like the X60. Only 9 of them were sold (4 to TÅGAB, 4 to Saga Rail and 1 to Transitio mainly as a source for spare parts), because their age and the lack of toilets made them unattractive on other routes. The 8 remaining units owned by TÅGAB and Saga Rail received another minor refurbishment, including exterior repainting and the installation of on-board toilets, and in early-2018 were started to be used on the routes Gothenburg–Falun and Stockholm–Linköping. Saga Rail soon after ceased operations and withdrew from the Stockholm–Linköping line, unit 3181 was used by Tågab until 2024 when it was scrapped.

== X11 ==
The X11 is a series of rebuilt X10s, constructed between 1993–1999 all non SL X10s were rebuilt for use on Skåne Commuter Rail and the Gothenburg Commuter Rail. 49 total units from Länstrafiken Malmöhus, Göteborgs Lokaltrafik, X-trafik, Västmanlands Lokaltrafik (except one which went to SL) and Upplands Lokaltrafik were rebuilt beginning with Länstrafiken Malmöhus who refurbished their X10 to include a more comfortable interior suitable for longer journeys, a toilet and fewer doors, GL followed soon after and gave their trains the same name, mainly to differentiate their higher weight, VL, UL and X-trafiks trains had a lower total weight and remained in the X10 class until they were sold either to Skåne or Gothenburg where they were included in the X11 class.

Skånetrafiken replaced its X11s with X61 after the opening of the Citytunnel in Malmö due to the older units lacking emergency brake override, which is required on trains which run through it. Transitio purchased them and all but two were leased to be used on Krösatågen and Norrtågen. Some received lighter refurbishments including new interiors.

== Gallery ==
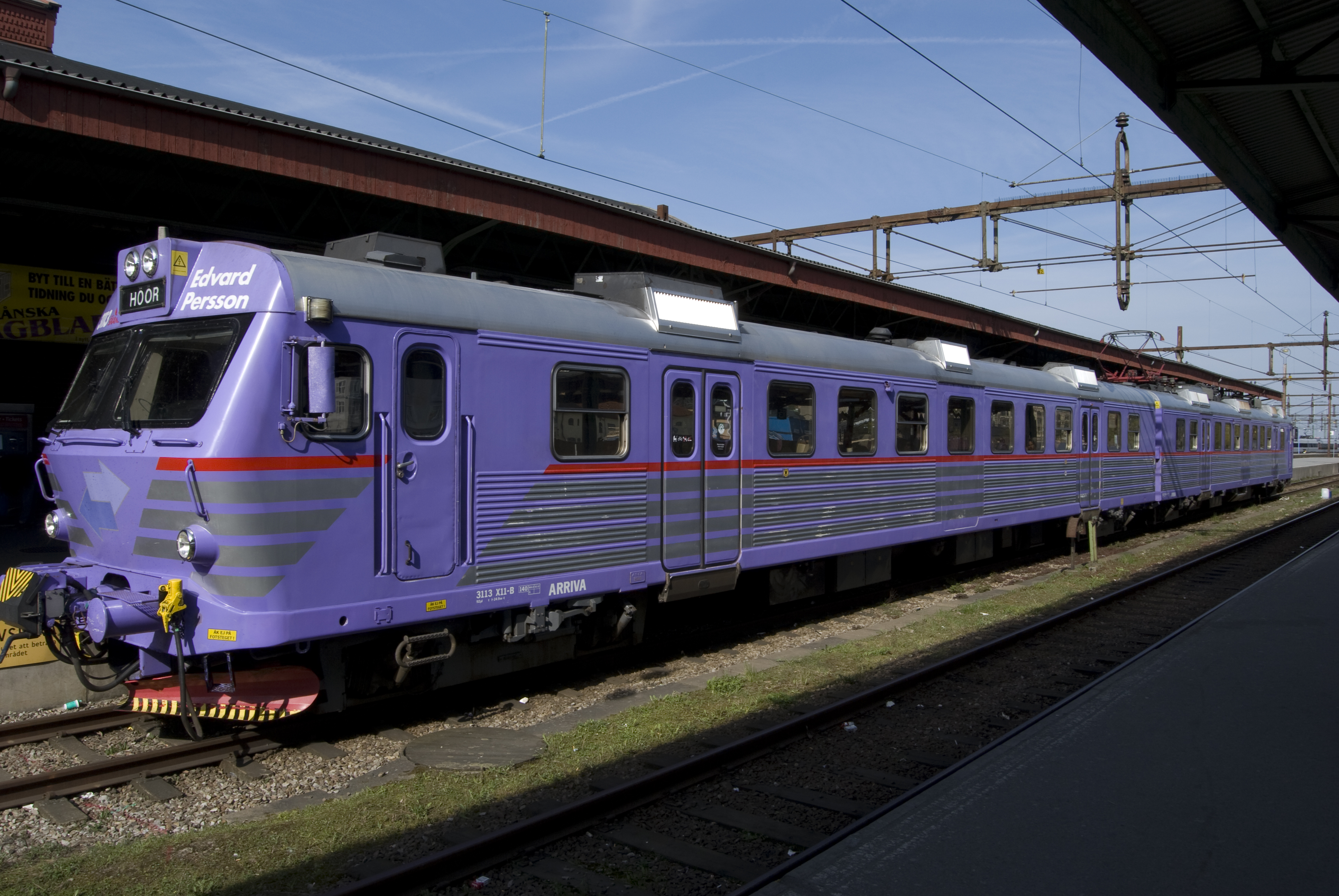
A Skåne Commuter Rail X11

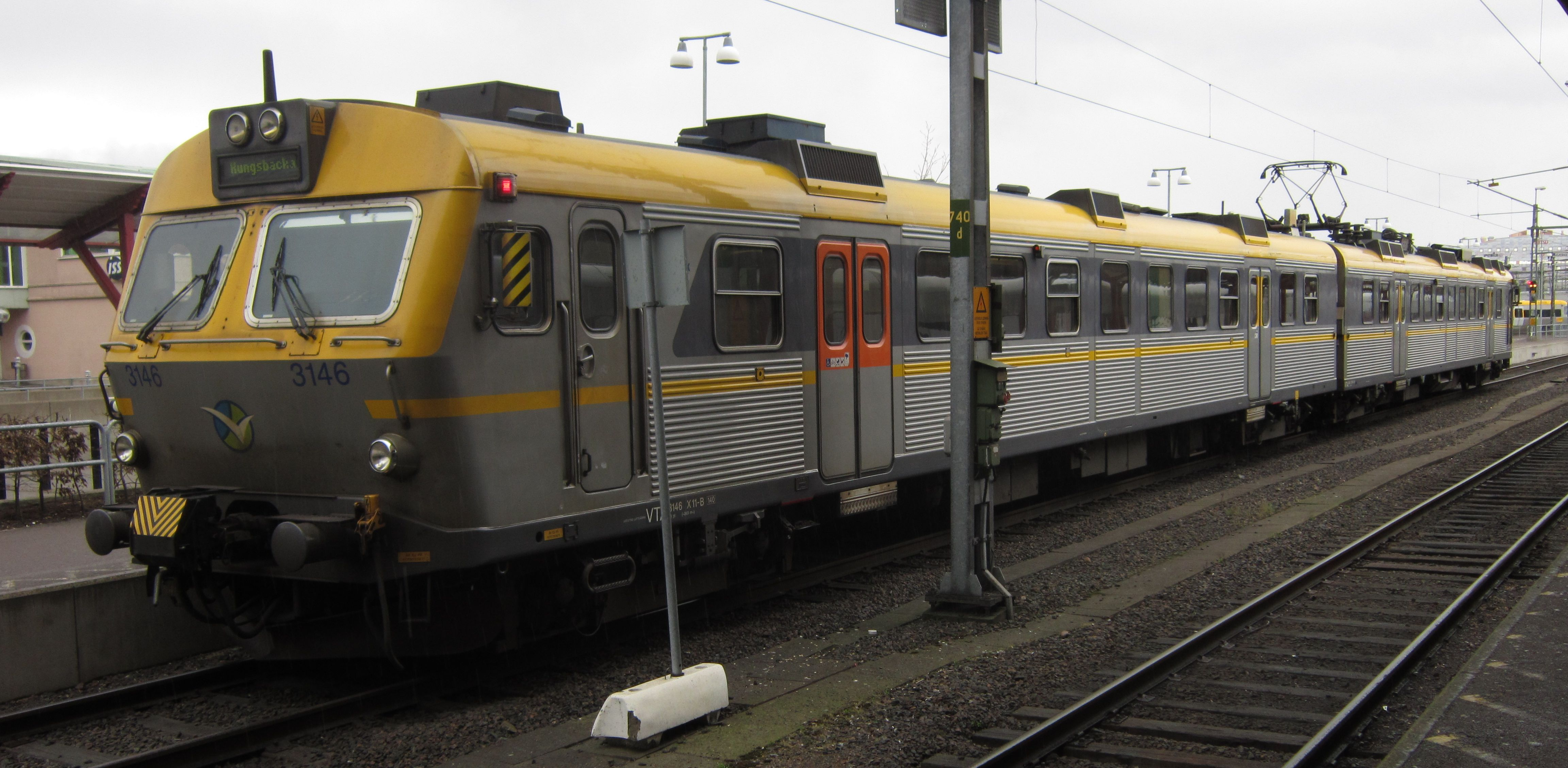
Västtrafik X11 at Gothenburg Central Station
