= X14 =

X14 or X-14 may refer to:

- X14 (New York City bus)
- Bell X-14, an American experimental aircraft
- Fukuyama Station, in Hiroshima Prefecture, Japan
- LaBelle Municipal Airport, in Florida, United States
- SJ X14, a Swedish two-car electric multiple unit
