= SJ X6 =

X6
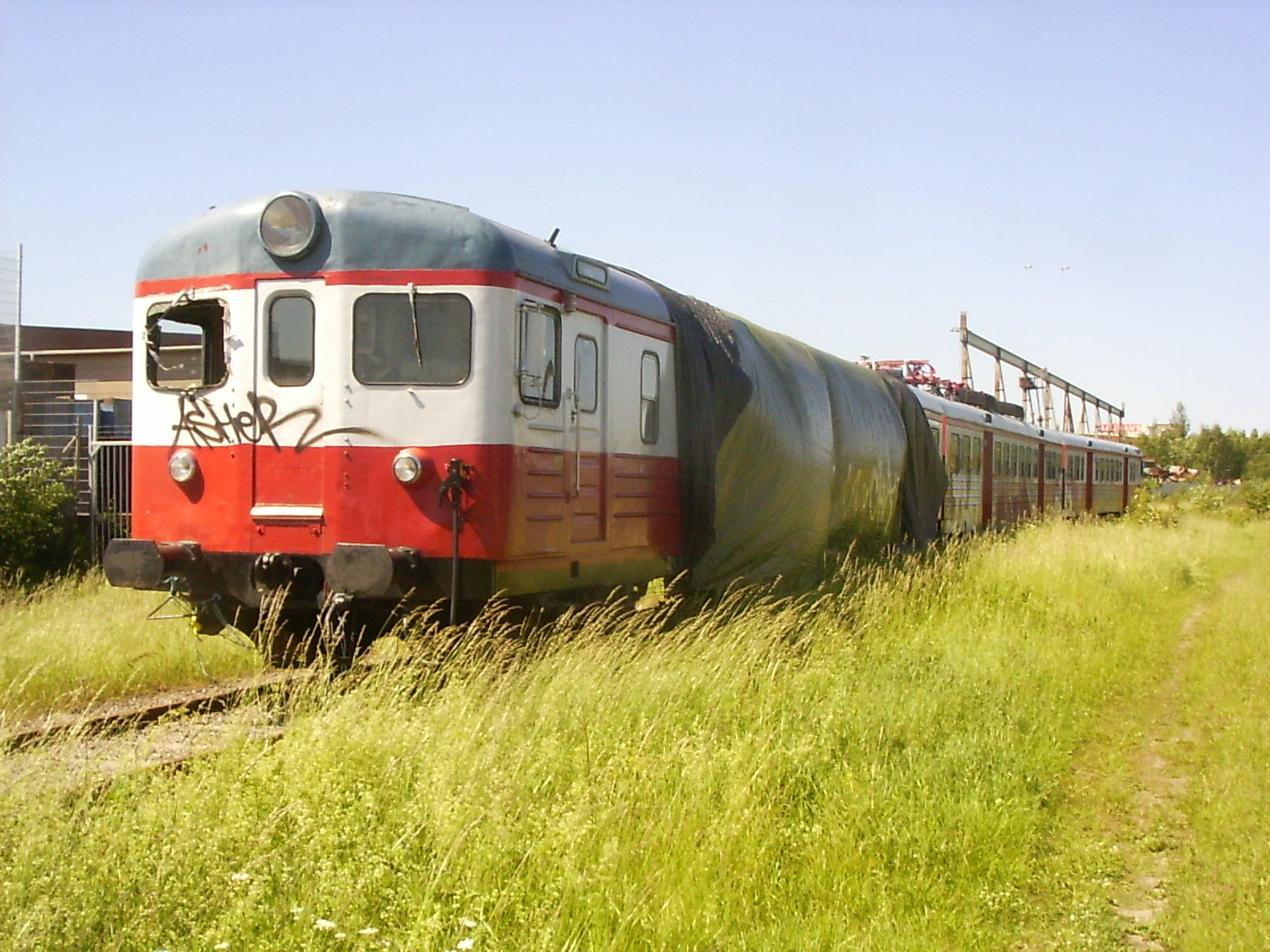
- In service: 1960–1985
- Manufacturer: ASEA
- Constructed: 1960
- Formation: Three cars
- Fleet numbers: 259–261
- Operators: Statens Järnvägar

Specifications
- Train length: 73,720 mm (241 ft 10.4 in)
- Maximum speed: 100 km/h (62 mph)
- Weight: 144.6 t (142.3 long tons; 159.4 short tons)
- Power output: 1,100 kW (1,500 hp)
- Electric system(s): 15 kV 16.7 Hz AC catenary
- Current collection: Pantograph
- Track gauge: 1,435 mm (4 ft 8 1/2 in)

X6 was a series of three-car electric multiple units operated by Statens Järnvägar (SJ) of Sweden as local trains around Stockholm and Gothenburg. Three units were built by Allmänna Svenska Elektriska Aktiebolaget (ASEA) in 1960 and were in service until 1985.

== History ==
The three X6-units were a test batch for SJ based on the X7-series delivered a few years before. They were put into service around Stockholm on the line Märsta–Södertälje. In 1965 it was decided that the landsting of Stockholm, through Storstockholms Lokaltrafik was to operate the Stockholm commuter rail. When the X1-series was delivered, SJ transferred the X6 to the Gothenburg area in 1970. They remained in service until 1985 when they were replaced by the X10.
