= Gothenburg commuter rail =

Commuter rail system in Gothenburg, Sweden

Göteborgs pendeltåg
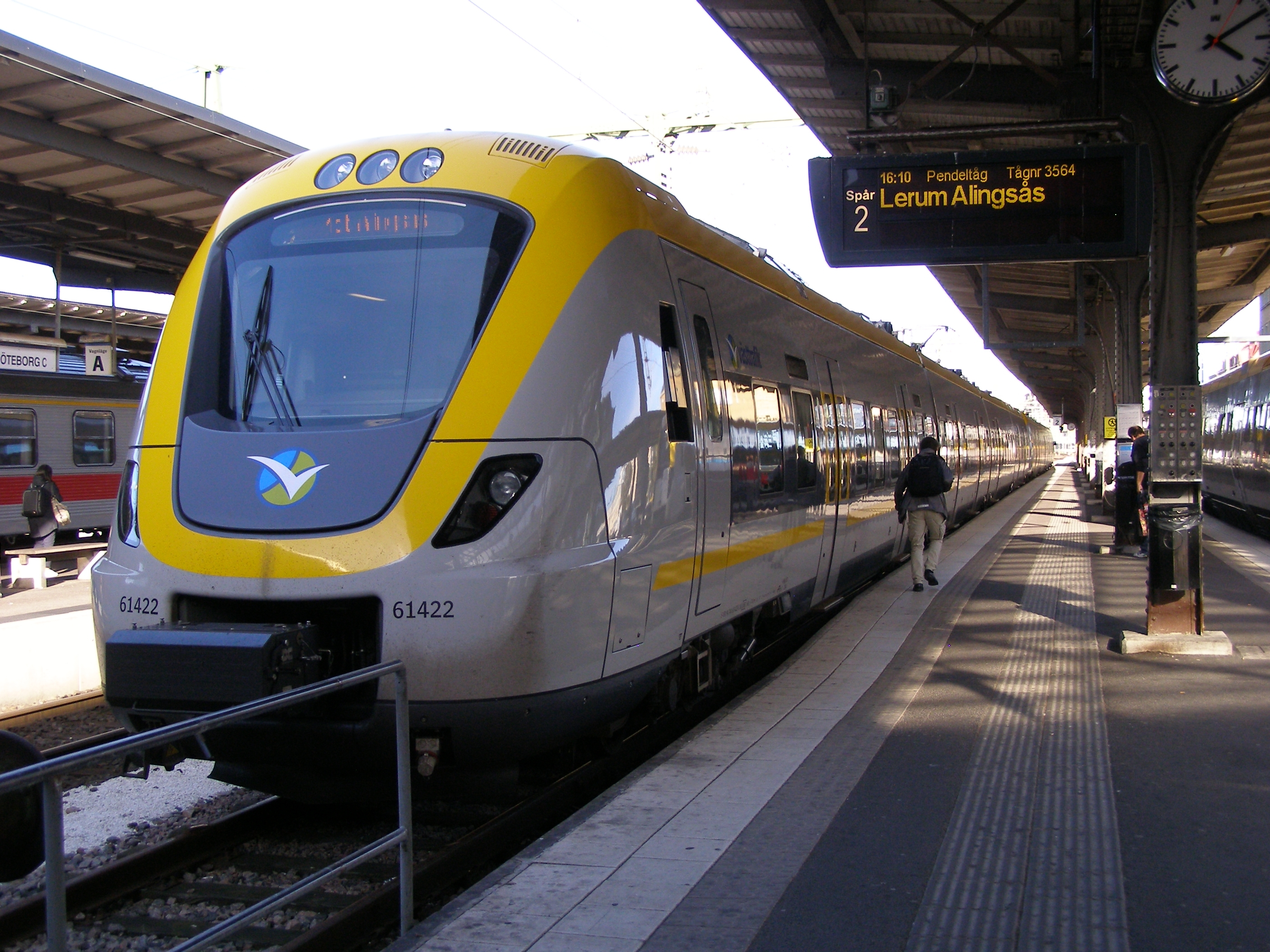
- An X61 train at the Central Station

Overview
- Locale: Gothenburg Metropolitan Area
- Transit type: Commuter rail
- Number of lines: 3 with 3 services
- Number of stations: 25
- Website: http://vasttrafik.se

Operation
- Began operation: 1960
- Operator: SJ on behalf of Västtrafik

Technical
- System length: 104 km (65 mi)
- Track gauge: 1,435 mm (4 ft 8 1/2 in)
- Top speed: 160 km/h (99 mph)
System map

Gothenburg commuter rail (Swedish: Göteborgs pendeltåg) is the commuter rail system associated with Gothenburg, Sweden. The trains use the main-line tracks, shared with long-distance trains and freight trains. They are operated with X11 and X61 electric multiple units.

== Services ==
There are three services in the Gothenburg commuter rail system. The first service was introduced in 1960, to Alingsås. In 1992 the service to Kungsbacka commenced operations after the railway line had been rebuilt as double track. The railway to Trollhättan was being rebuilt as a double track railway and completed in 2012, with both a third commuter rail connection to Älvängen and a denser regional schedule to Trollhättan introduced.

Line	Stretch	Length	Stations
Alependeln	Göteborg C – Älvängen	31 km	7
Alingsåspendeln	Göteborg C – Lerum – Floda – Alingsås	45 km	12
Kungsbackapendeln	Göteborg C – Mölndal – Kungsbacka	28 km	8

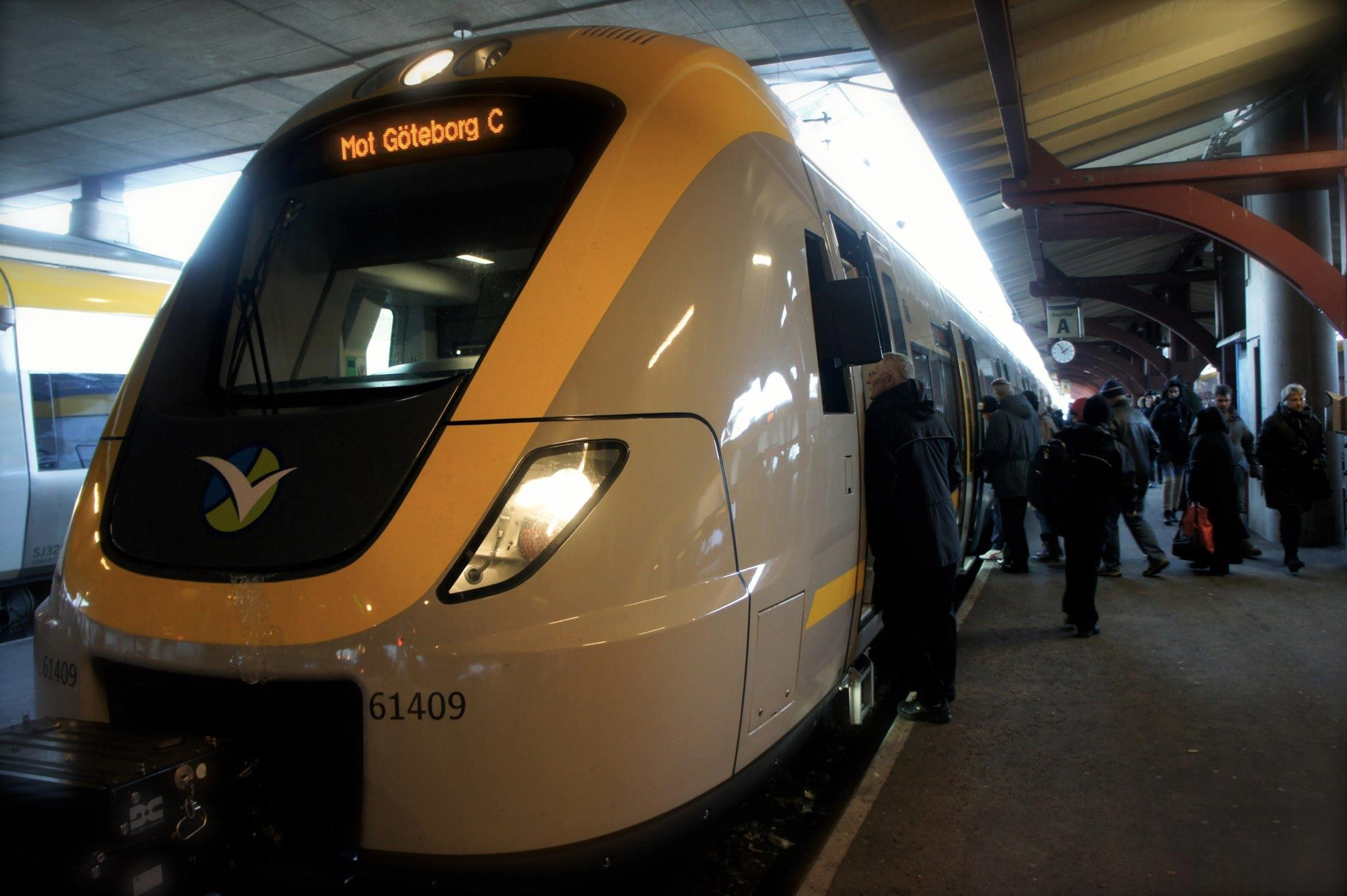
An X61 at Gothenburg Central Station

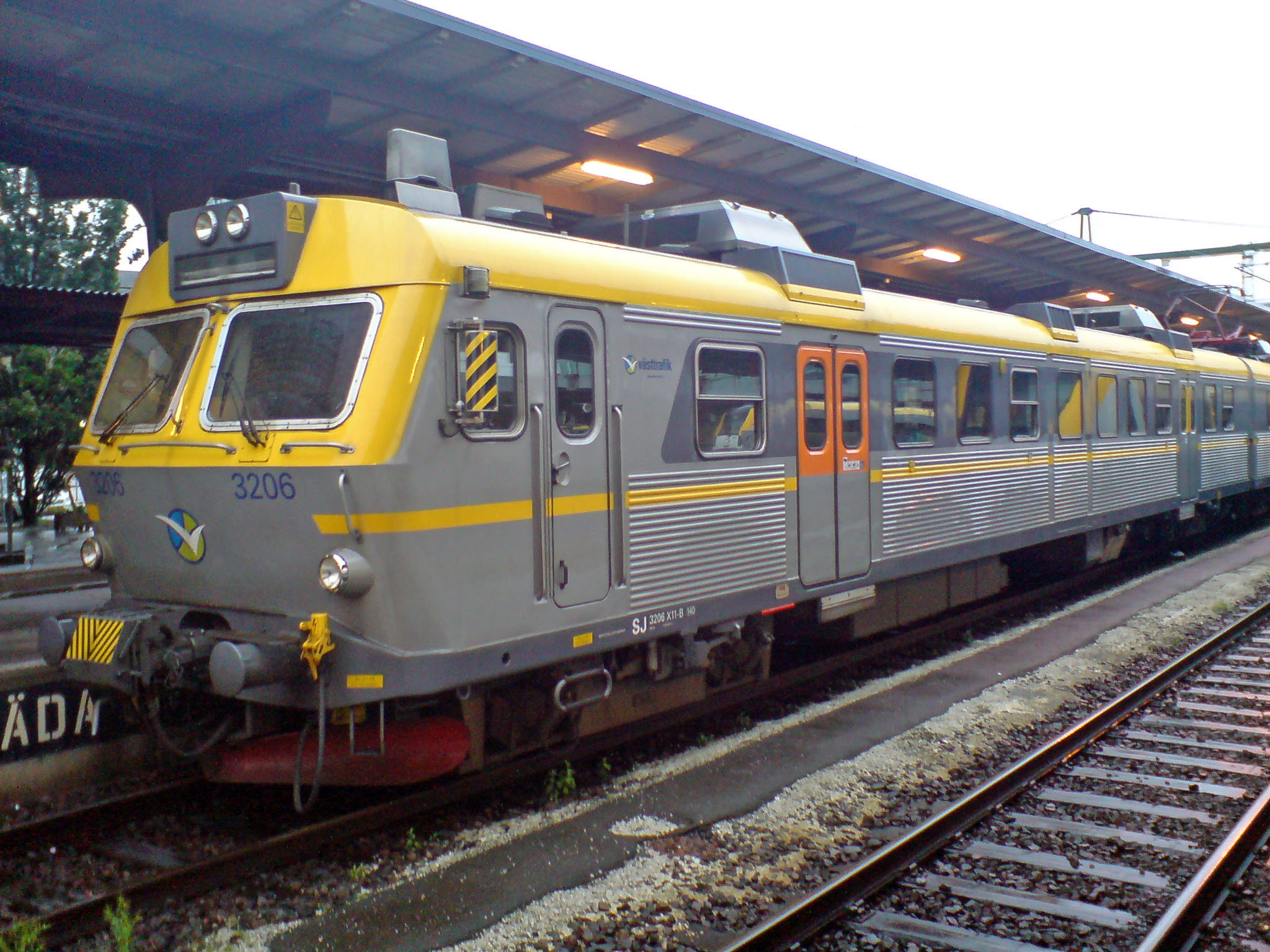
An X11 at Gothenburg Central Station

== Regional rail services ==
In addition there are some regional rail services, going to cities further away, with a higher speed and more sparse stops.

Line	Stretch	Length	Stations
Vänersborgståget	Gothenburg Central Station - Trollhättan - Vänersborg	86 km	4
Boråståget	Gothenburg Central Station - Borås	71 km	7
Bohuståget	Gothenburg Central Station - Stenungsund - Uddevalla - Strömstad	180 km	17
Skövdetåget	Gothenburg Central Station - Alingsås - Skövde	144 km	8

In contrast to Stockholm, Västtrafik monthly tickets (of course within the geographic area the ticket covers) can be used on SJ inter-city trains as well (but not X 2000 and some other fast trains). Since 2010 all Västtrafik regional trains are part of the Västtrafik pay-per-ride ticket system.

The regional trains to Borås, Vänersborg and Skövde run in addition to the long-distance trains, filling up gaps between them, to create one-hour schedule. The trains to Strömstad are kind of long-distance train by themselves, but the county authorities has responsibility, since it was inside one county also before the county reform 1998. The railways to Borås and Strömstad are single track, which makes it hard to have denser schedule than once per hour, without having too many slow train meetings, and there are freight trains as well. The Gothenburg-Stenungsund line has extra departures creating half-hour schedule in rush hour. To Vänersborg there is from 2012 double track and sometimes two trains per hour.

A fifth rail line that can be counted as a regional rail line is the Öresundståg Gothenburg–Malmö–Copenhagen (360 km). Västtrafik monthly passes are valid to Kungsbacka, but this is not usually considered a Västtrafik line.

The most used connection on these lines is the connection to Borås, if including the about 60 daily buses that go since the railway can't support the demand. There are plans to build a new railway here, as part of Götalandsbanan, which is going to be a super-highspeed railway (max 320 km/h). The first part, Mölnlycke-Bollebygd, is planned to be opened around 2020-2025, and later extended to Stockholm.
