= Floda BoIF =

Swedish football club

- Full name: Floda Boll-och Idrottsförening
- Founded: 1935
- Ground: Flodala IP; Floda, Lerum, Sweden
- Chairman: Mats Ericson
- Head coach: Bengt Kristensson
- League: Division 4 Göteborg A
- 2013: Division 4 Göteborg A, 3rd
Home colours	Away colours

Floda BoIF is a Swedish football club located in Floda, Lerum, near Gothenburg.

== Background ==
Since their foundation on 11 February 1935 Floda Boll-och Idrottsförening has participated mainly in the middle and lower divisions of the Swedish football league system. The club currently plays in Division 4 Göteborg A, which is the sixth tier of Swedish football, following two successive relegations in 2006 and 2007. They play their home matches at the Flodala IP in Floda.

Floda BoIF are affiliated to the Göteborgs Fotbollförbund. Floda BoIF have competed in the Svenska Cupen on 17 occasions and have played 33 matches in the competition. They played in the 2003 Svenska Cupen and reached the second round when they lost 1–9 at home to Örgryte IS.

== Season to season ==
Season	Level	Division	Section	Position	Movements
1993	Tier 5	Division 4	Göteborg A	4th	
1994	Tier 5	Division 4	Göteborg A	6th	
1995	Tier 5	Division 4	Göteborg A	9th	
1996	Tier 5	Division 4	Göteborg A	10th	
1997	Tier 5	Division 4	Göteborg A	7th	
1998	Tier 5	Division 4	Göteborg A	8th	
1999	Tier 5	Division 4	Göteborg A	6th	
2000	Tier 5	Division 4	Göteborg A	1st	Promoted
2001	Tier 4	Division 3	Nordvästra Götaland	4th	
2002	Tier 4	Division 3	Mellersta Götaland	1st	Promoted
2003	Tier 3	Division 2	Västra Götaland	6th	
2004	Tier 3	Division 2	Västra Götaland	2nd	
2005	Tier 3	Division 2	Västra Götaland	10th	
2006*	Tier 4	Division 2	Västra Götaland	10th	Relegation Playoffs – Relegated
2007	Tier 5	Division 3	Mellersta Götaland	12th	Relegated
2008	Tier 6	Division 4	Göteborg A	9th	
2009	Tier 6	Division 4	Göteborg A	7th	
2010	Tier 6	Division 4	Göteborg A	8th	
2011	Tier 6	Division 4	Göteborg A	4th	
2015	Tier 6	Division 4	Göteborg A	6th	
2016	Tier 6	Division 4	Göteborg A	7th	
2017	Tier 6	Division 4	Göteborg A	9th	
2018	Tier 6	Division 4	Göteborg A	11th	Relegated
2019	Tier 7	Division 5	Göteborg A	6th	
2020	Tier 7	Division 5	Göteborg A	6th	
2021	Tier 7	Division 5	Göteborg A	2nd	

* League restructuring in 2006 resulted in a new division being created at Tier 3 and subsequent divisions dropping a level.

== Attendances ==
In recent seasons Floda BoIF have had the following average attendances:

Season	Average attendance	Division / Section	Level
2005	189	Div 2 Västra Götaland	Tier 3
2006	122	Div 2 Västra Götaland	Tier 4
2007	95	Div 3 Mellersta Götaland	Tier 5
2008	Not available	Div 4 Göteborg A	Tier 6
2009	Not available	Div 4 Göteborg A	Tier 6
2010	55	Div 4 Göteborg A	Tier 6

* Attendances are provided in the Publikliga sections of the Svenska Fotbollförbundet website.
