= SJ X12 =

X12
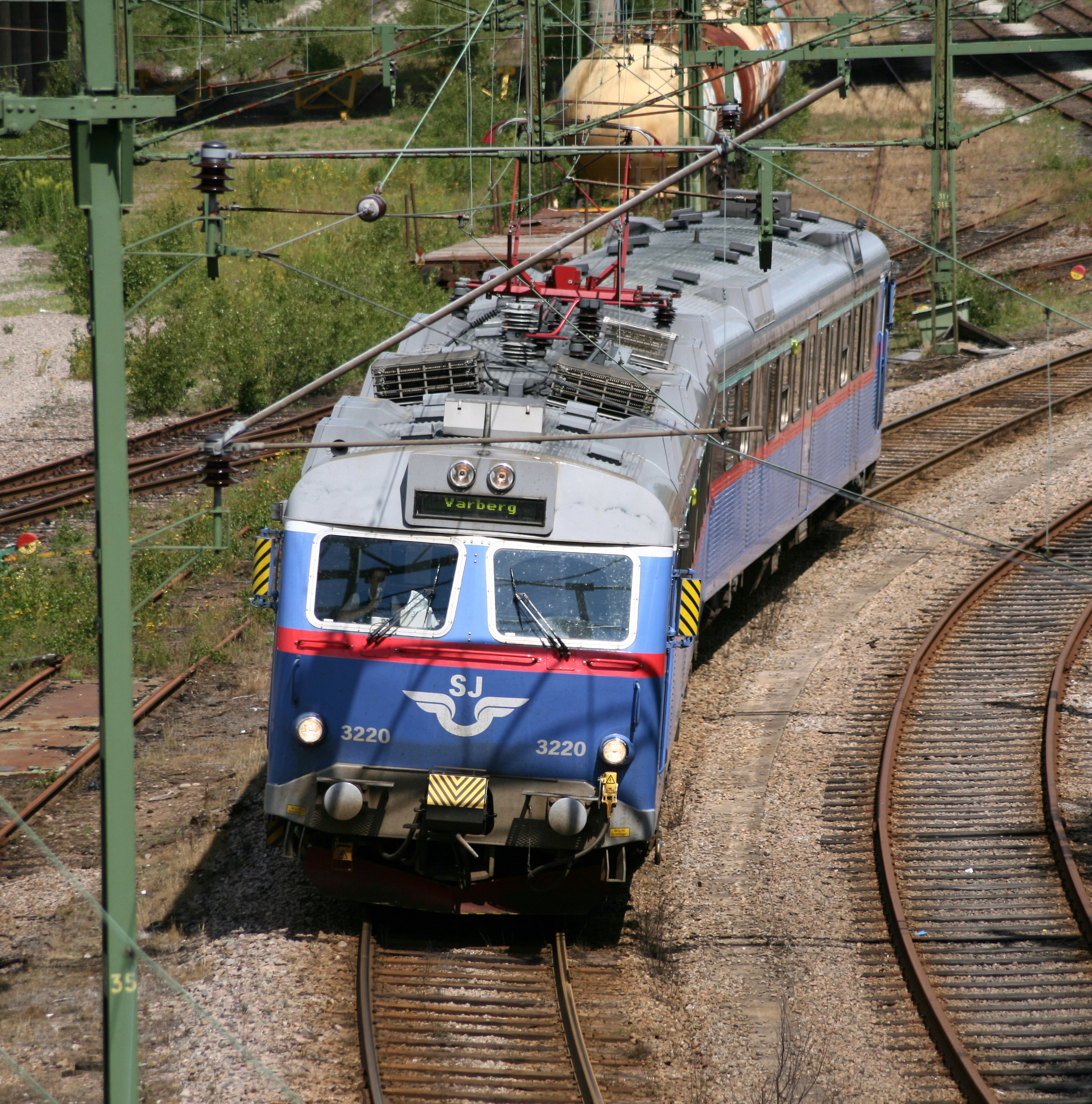
- SJ X12 outside Borås in 2008

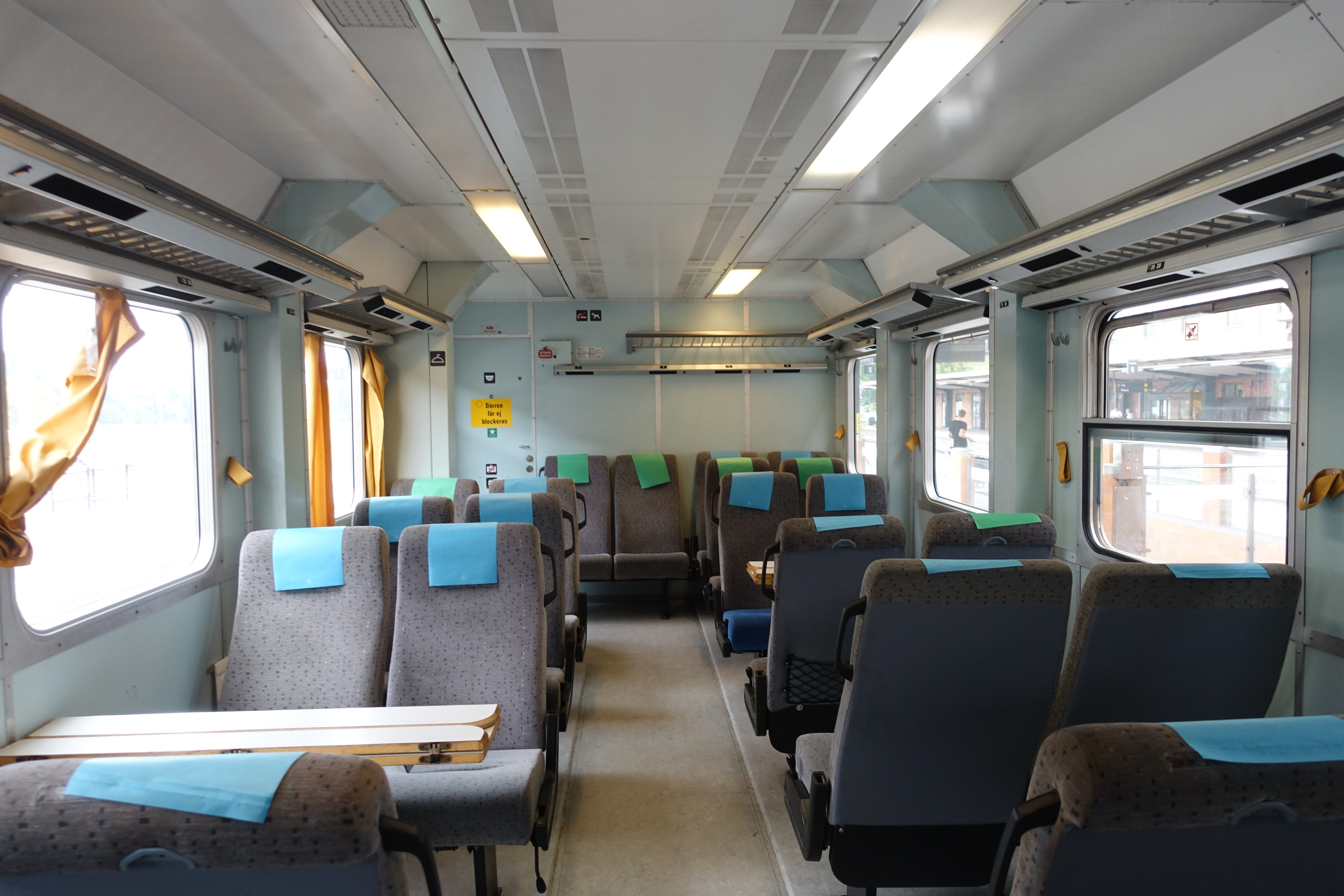
- The unrefurbished interior of unit 3192 in 2018.
- Stock type: 2-car electric multiple unit
- In service: 1991–present
- Manufacturer: Asea Brown Boveri
- Constructed: 1991–1994
- Number built: 18
- Number in service: 13
- Successor: ER 1 X50
- Fleet numbers: 3190-3197, 3214-3223
- Capacity: 122 seats + 11 folding seats (Västtrafik)
- Operators: Statens Järnvägar; Västtrafik

Specifications
- Train length: 49,868 mm (163 ft 7.3 in)
- Width: 3,080 mm (10 ft 1.3 in)
- Maximum speed: 160 km/h (100 mph)
- Weight: 103 tonnes (101 long tons; 114 short tons)
- Power output: 1,280 kW (1,720 hp)
- Electric system: 15 kV 16.7 Hz AC catenary
- Current collection: Pantograph
- UIC classification: Bo'Bo'+2′2'
- Braking system: KE-R
- Track gauge: 1,435 mm (4 ft 8 1/2 in)

The X12 is a series of two-car electric multiple units originally operated by Statens Järnvägar (SJ) on local trains. Eighteen units were built by Asea Brown Boveri in 1991–94. The X12 is based on the somewhat older X10 but has a higher top speed and an interior adapted for longer journeys. They were fitted with a toilet, galley and two class seating arrangement when entering service. The first and second class both had the same seats although first class had more legroom.

During the later 1990s and 2000s the X12 was put into service by Regional Transport Authorities including Upplands Lokaltrafik who operated three from 1997 to 2003, two were upgraded to X14. Västtrafik also received several X12s during the early 2000s, they were repainted in Västtrafik colours and fitted with a single class configuration. SJ kept a few to be used on lines in Mälardalen and these received a full retrofit in 2012 that included new toilets, electrical outlets, better seats, handicap toilets, wheelchair ramps and a full repaint to better fit in with the rest of SJ's fleet.

During 2021 the X12s in Mälardalen were replaced with newer X50, X52 and ER1. The trains were transferred to Västtrafik service, Transitio who previously kept three unrefurbished scrapped them in 2021.

== Units status in January 2026 ==
Unit	Status	Notes
3190	Rebuilt to X14	X14 for Östgötatrafiken, currently X14 3190 for Krösatågen. Previously named Nyköpingen.
3191	Scrapped in 2021	Transitio (unrefurbished)
3192	Scrapped in 2021	Transitio (unrefurbished)
3193	Scrapped after spare parts picking	Transitio (unrefurbished)
3194	In use (Västtrafik)	Modernized by SJ, leased to Västtrafik.
3195	In use (Västtrafik)	Modernized by Västtrafiken
3196	In use (Västtrafik)	Modernized by Västtrafiken
3197	In use (Västtrafik)	Modernized by Västtrafiken previously named Hubert.
3214	In use (Västtrafik)	Modernized by Västtrafiken
3215	In use (Västtrafik)	Modernized by Västtrafiken
3216	In use (Västtrafik)	Modernized by Västtrafiken
3217	In use (Västtrafik)	Modernized by Västtrafiken
3218	In use (Västtrafik)	Modernized by Västtrafiken
3219	In use (Västtrafik)	Modernized by Västtrafiken
3220	In use (Västtrafik)	Modernized by SJ, leased to Västtrafik.
3221	In use (Västtrafik)	Modernized by SJ, leased to Västtrafik.
3222	In use (Västtrafik)	Modernized by SJ, leased to Västtrafik.
3223	Rebuilt to X14	X14 for Östgötatrafiken, currently X14 3223 for Krösatågen.
