= SL X1 =

X1
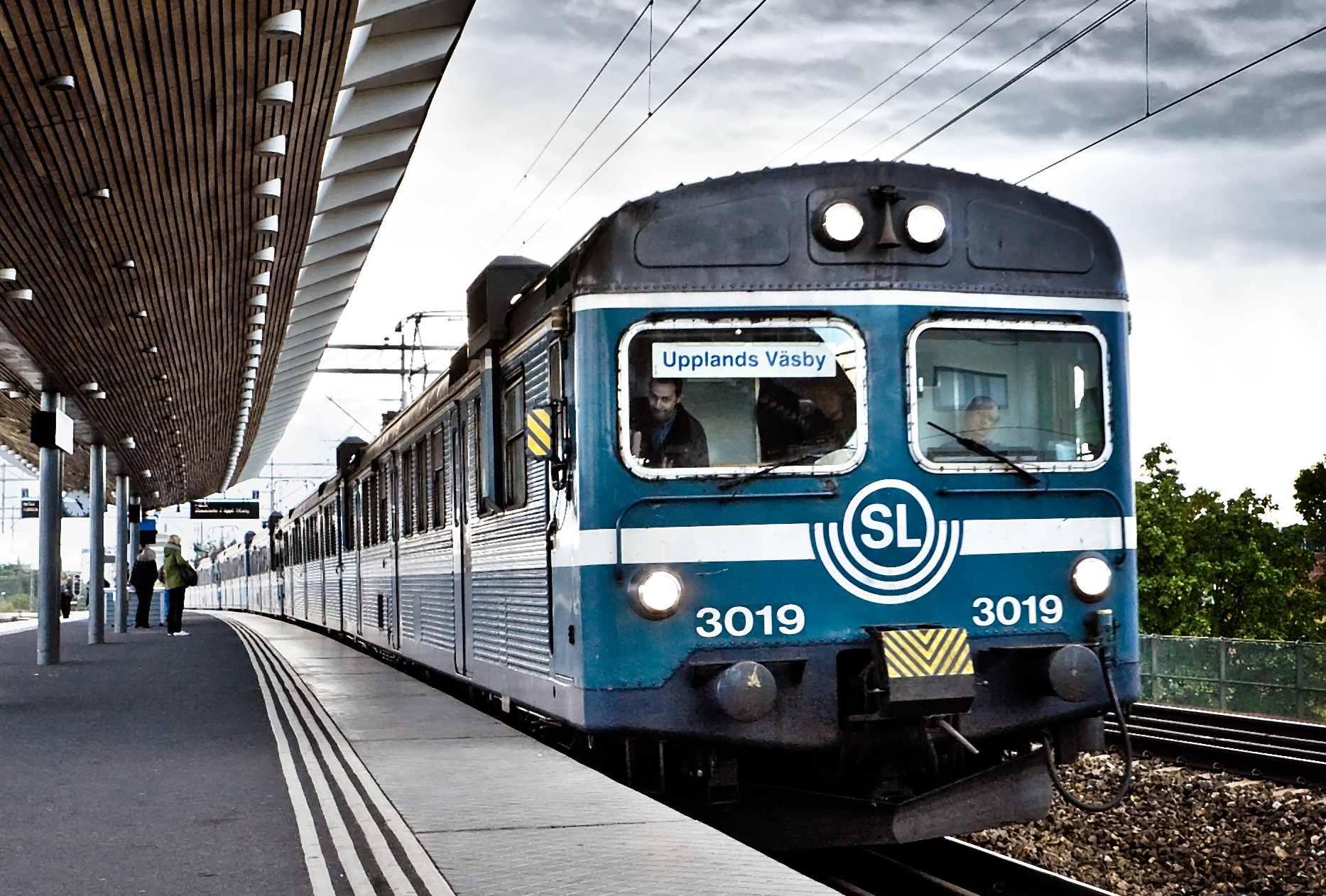
- X1 at Årstaberg station

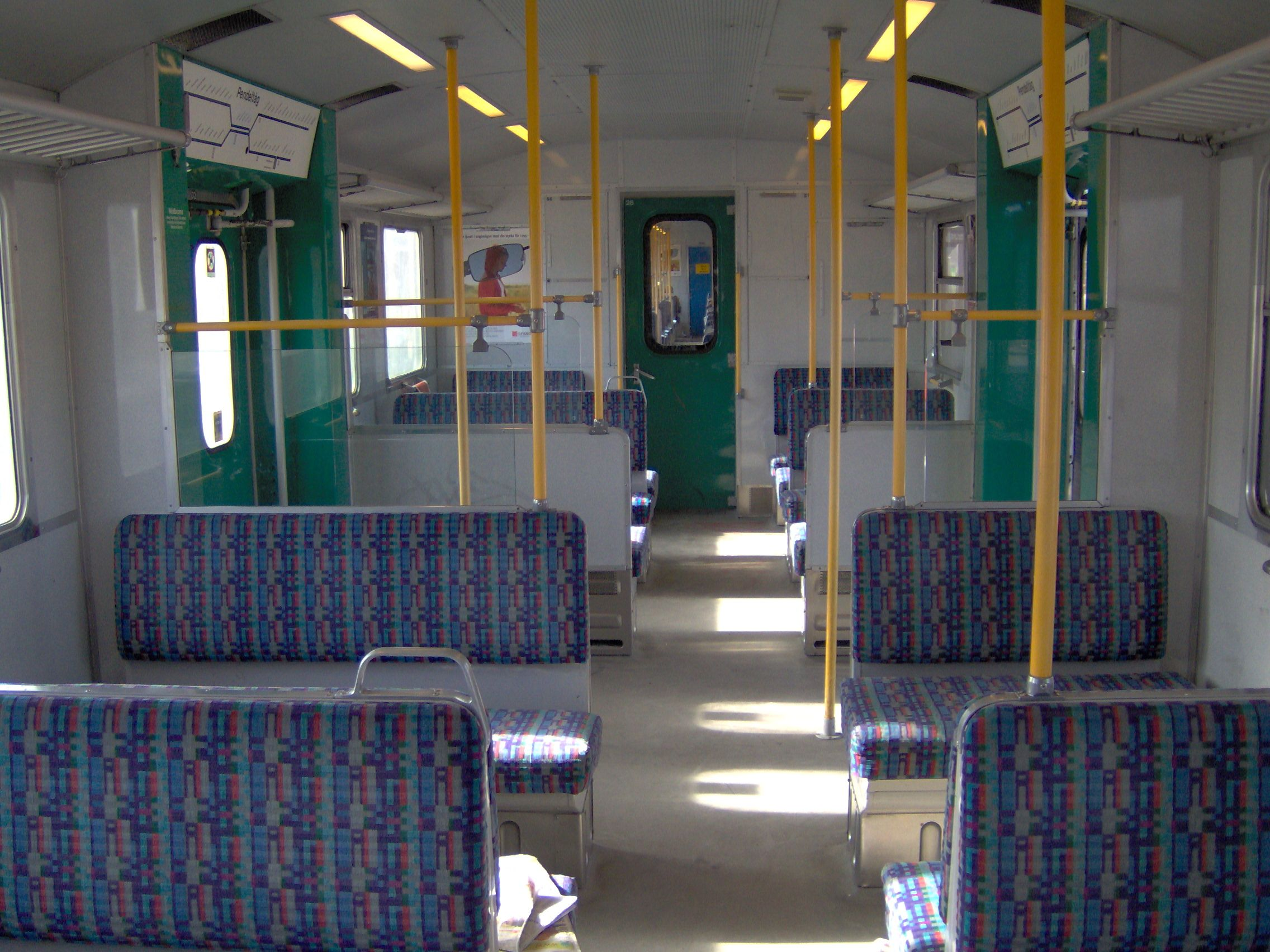
- In service: 1968–2011
- Manufacturer: ASEA, Kalmar Verkstad, ASJ
- Constructed: 1967–1975
- Entered service: 1968–2011
- Scrapped: 2004–2011
- Number built: 104
- Number scrapped: 103
- Capacity: 196
- Operators: Storstockholms Lokaltrafik; Citypendeln; Stockholmståg; MTR Nordic
- Lines served: Stockholm commuter rail

Specifications
- Train length: 49.55 m (162 ft 7 in) (2 cars)
- Width: 3,150 mm (124 in)
- Platform height: 760 mm
- Maximum speed: 222 km/h (138 mph) (albeit affectively 120 km/h (75 mph))
- Weight: 78 t (76.8 long tons; 86.0 short tons)
- Power output: 1,120 kW (1,500 hp)
- Electric system(s): 15 kV 16.7 Hz AC catenary
- Current collection: Pantograph
- Braking system(s): disk brakes
- Track gauge: 1,435 mm (4 ft 8 1/2 in)

Notes/references
- 2 cars fleet numbers 3001-3004

X1 was a series of two-car electric multiple units (twin units) owned by Greater Stockholm Transport (SL) on the Stockholm commuter rail. The X1 was operated in sets of up to five units, making ten-car trains, each unit consisting of one motor car and one unpowered car. 104 units were built by ASEA in 1967–75 and were replaced by the new X60. The X1 also served as the foundation for the later X10–X14 series trains, built in the 1980s and 1990s.

== History ==
The X1 was based on the SJ X6 taken into service in the 1960s, that had replaced locomotive-pulled trains. The X1 interior was based more on the Stockholm Metro with five-abreast seating (2 + 3) and three doors per car. Since the start in 1968 the trains were renovated several times, although they retained mostly the same appearance as they did in the 1960s. An X1 train was used as a test train during the development of the high speed train X 2000, with technologies and techniques such as tilt being added, that would later make it into the final train (X 2000). With these adjustments, this X1 train managed to reach a speed of 222 km/h during testing, which was a new record for the train. They were completely compatible with the X10 introduced in the 1980s. The X1 began to be taken out of service in 2004 and was planned to be completely retired in 2007/2008. Due to problems with the new X60 trains the deadline was delayed several times. The last X1 units were taken out of service in April 2011.

== Preserved units ==
Unit 3019 is preserved at the Swedish Railway Museum in Gävle. Part of unit 3020 is preserved at the Spårvägsmuseet in Stockholm.

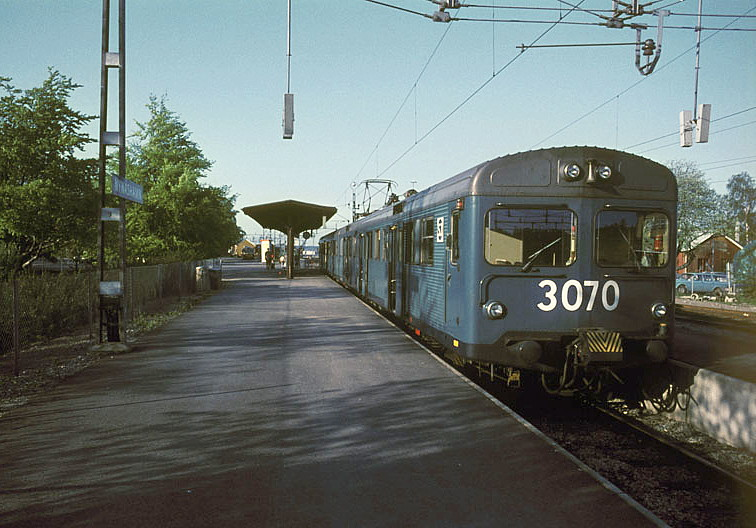
SL X1 in original livery at Nynäshamn, 1975

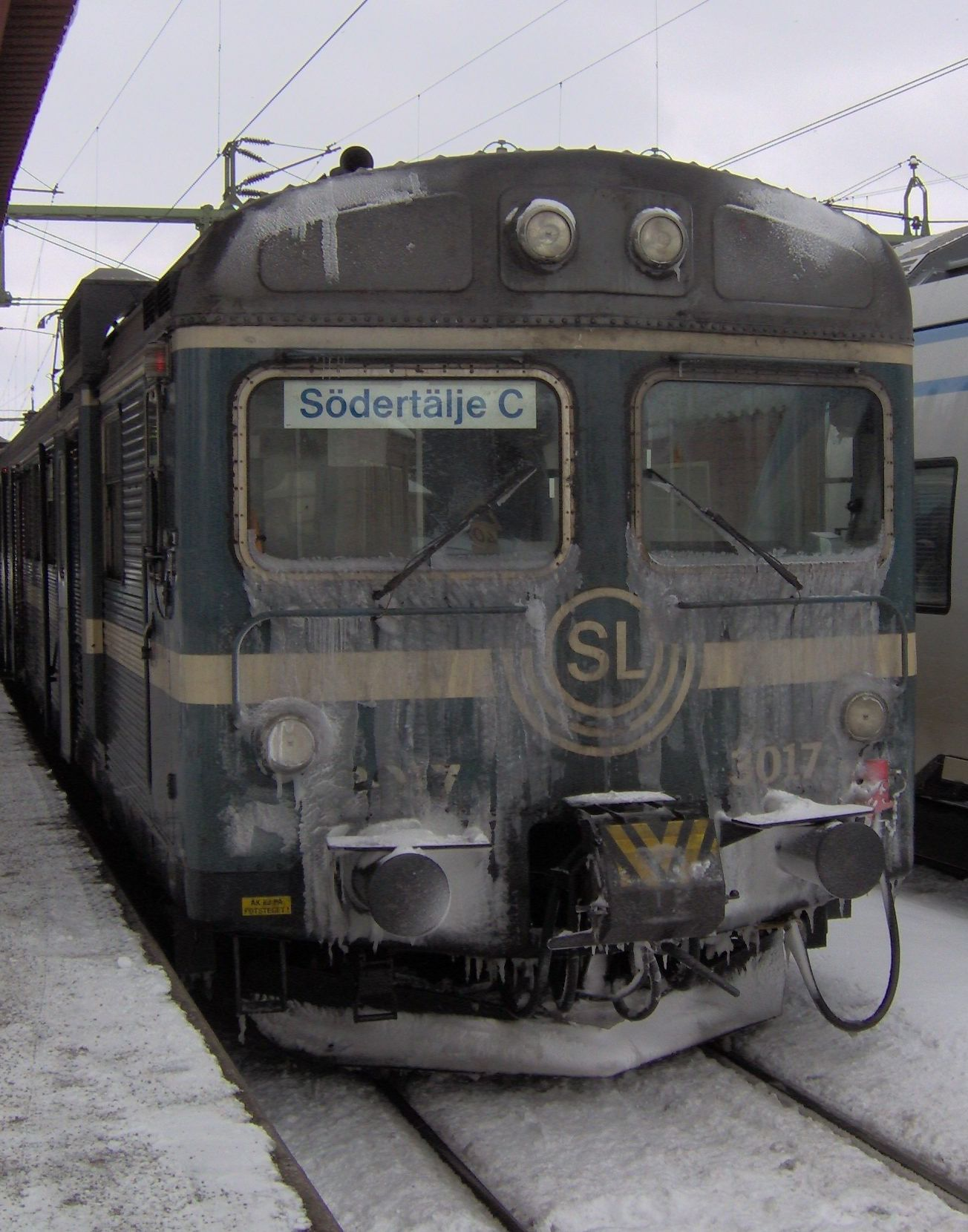
X1 in winter, 2006

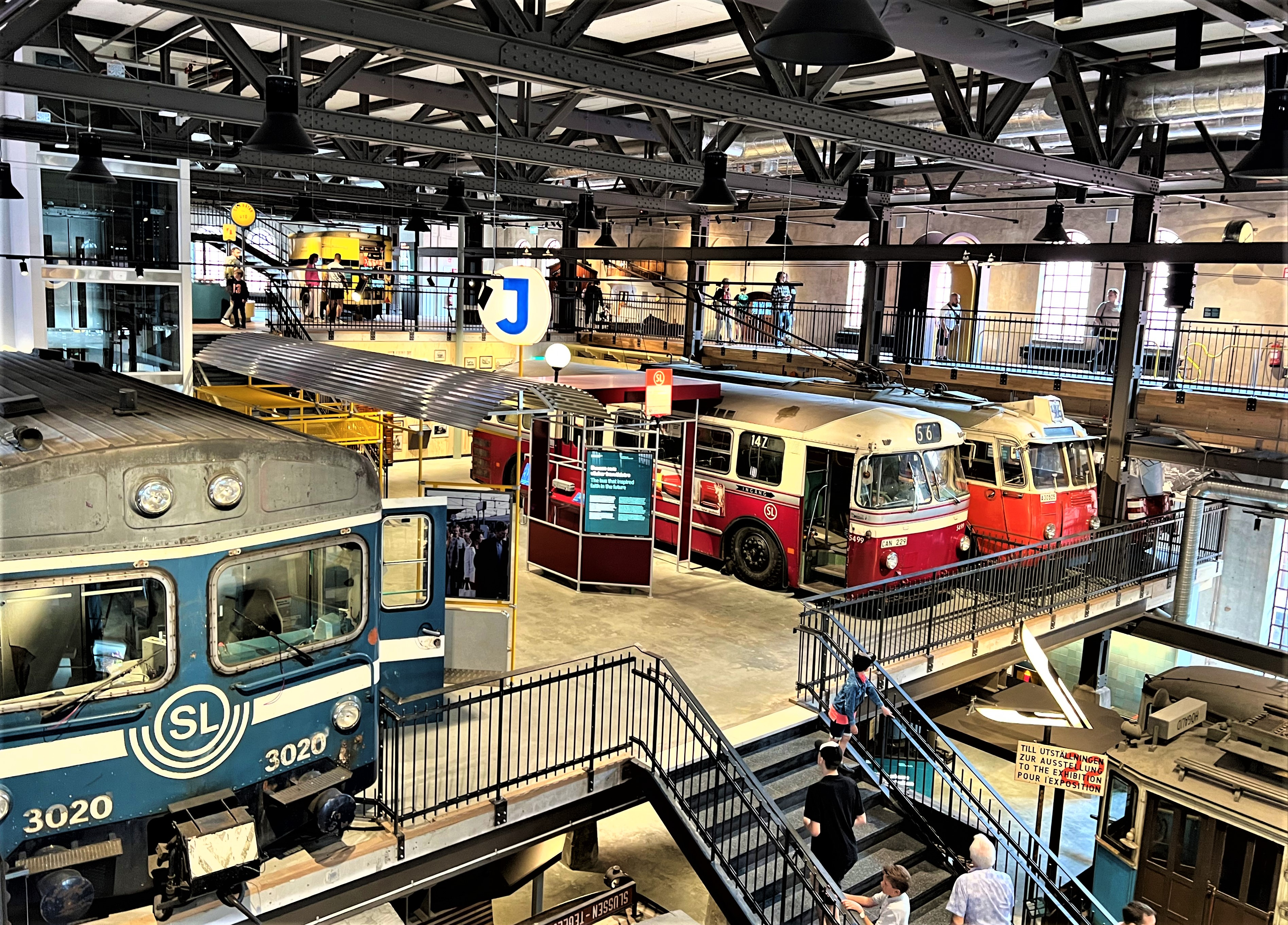
Part of preserved unit 3020 (far left), June 2022
