= Adèle Wetterlind =

Swedish teacher and suffragette (1854–1938)

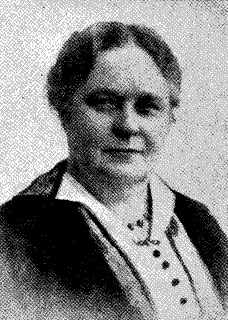
- Born: 25 August 1854; Floda, Västergötland, Sweden
- Died: 13 October 1938 (aged 84); Jönköping County, Sweden
- Occupations: educator, social welfare campaigner and suffragist
- Organization: Swedish Teachers' Association

Adèle Wetterlind (25 August 1854 – 13 October 1938) was a Swedish educator, social welfare campaigner and suffragist.

== Biography ==
Adèle Wetterlind was born on 25 August 1854 in the Floda parish. She was also known as the "explosive" Adèle.

Wetterlind became a primary school teacher in Årdala when she was aged 17, then attended Stockholm's Folkskollärarinneseminarium to train as an elementary school teacher. From 1881, she was employed at Jönköping Elementary Schools until her retirement in 1919. She worked here for a total of 45 years. She was a member of the union, the Swedish Teachers' Association, regularly delivering lectures at their events and writing on pedagogy to the press.

Wetterlind campaigned as a suffragist, cycling around the country to promote the cause for women's suffrage. This was an "unusual sight" at the time. She also campaigned for the establishment of a local workhouse and dental clinic.

Wetterlind died on 13 October 1938 in Jönköping.

In 1996, a trail in Jönköping city park was named in her honour.
