= Floda, Lerum =

Floda
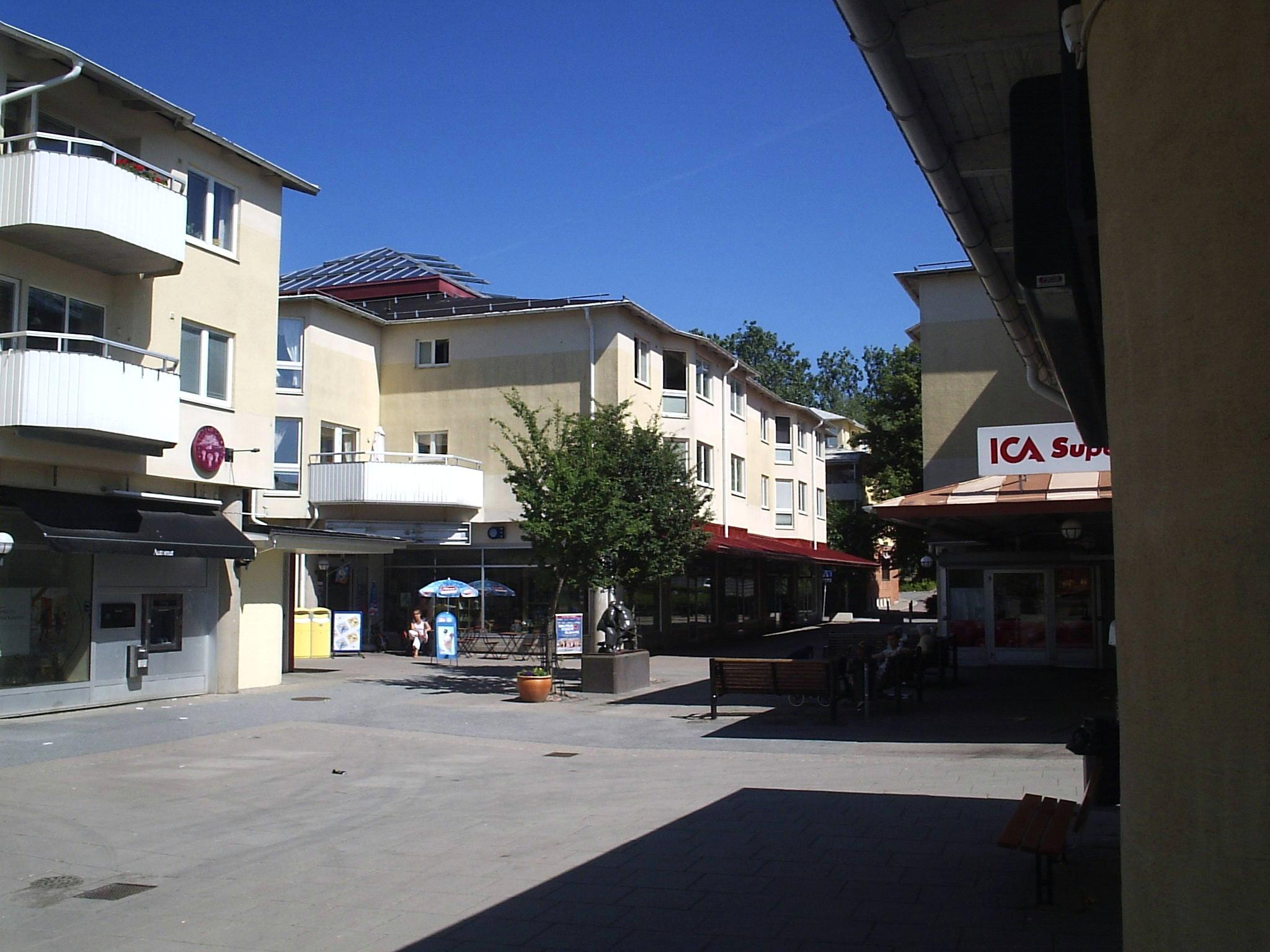

- Location within Västra Götaland Location within Sweden
- Coordinates: 57°49′N 12°22′E
- Country: Sweden
- Province: Västergötland
- County: Västra Götaland County
- Municipality: Lerum Municipality

Area
  - Total: 5.85 km^{2} (2.26 sq mi)

Population (31 December 2010)
  - Total: 8,021
  - Density: 1,371/km^{2} (3,550/sq mi)
- Time zone: UTC+1 (CET)
  - Summer (DST): UTC+2 (CEST)

Floda is a locality situated in Lerum Municipality, Västra Götaland County, Sweden. It had 8,021 inhabitants in 2010 and is situated 54 meters above sea level at Lake Sävelångens entrance to River Säveån.

Floda has a station on the Gothenburg commuter rail system, Alingsås line. The station house was completed in 1903, but has gone through many changes since then.

Skallsjö Church in Floda was built in 1861–1863 to replace what today is the Skallsjö Church ruins, situated two kilometers to the south-west of the church. The oldest parts of the original Skallsjö Church was built in the 13th century (1200-1299).

Floda is the home of:

- Felicia Brandström, Swedish singer
- Football club Floda BoIF, Swedish Division 4.
- Floorball club Floda IBK, Division 1, is one of largest sports clubs in Lerum.

Teacher and suffragette Adèle Wetterlind was also born in Floda.
