= Saga Rail =

- Industry: Railway operator
- Founded: 23 February 2018
- Founder: Mats Nyblom
- Defunct: June 2018
- Headquarters: Sweden
- Owner: Mats Nvblom
- Website: www.sagarail.se

Saga Rail was a short-lived open access operator in Sweden. It was founded by Mats Nyblom who had previously established Hector Rail. It commenced operations on 23 February 2018 with a twice weekly service from Stockholm to Linköping with intermediate stops at Nyköping and Norrköping.

Four former X10 electric multiple units were acquired from Storstockholms Lokaltrafik and painted in a pink livery.

Operations ceased in June 2018 after Saga Rail lost an appeal with the Swedish Competition Authority over SJ's refusal to sell its tickets on its website.
