= Markus Hillukkala =

Swedish bandy player

Markus Hillukkala (born 1987) is a Swedish bandy player who currently plays for Bollnäs GIF (2005-) as a defender. Markus was a youth product of Oxelösunds IK (2003-2005) and moved when he was a teenager to Bollnäs GIF. Markus played for the Swedish under-19 team during the 2005/06 season.
