= Norske tog =

Norwegian railway company

Norske tog AS
- Formerly: Materiellselskapet AS
- Type: State-owned
- Industry: Rolling stock company
- Founded: June 16, 2016; 10 years ago
- Headquarters: Oslo, Norway
- Area served: Norway
- Products: Rolling stock company
- Operating income: ▲NOK 483 million (2025)
- Number of employees: ▲87 (2025)
- Parent: Ministry of Transport
- Website: https://www.norsketog.no/

Norske tog AS is a state owned rolling stock leasing company owned by the Ministry of Transport as part of a restructuring to Norwegian's railway system.
