= Åkarps IF =

Swedish football club

- Full name: Åkarps Idrottsförening
- Ground: Åkarps IP; Åkarp; Sweden
- Chairman: Carsten Larsen
- League: Division 3 Södra Götaland

Åkarps IF is a Swedish football club located in Åkarp.

== Background ==
Åkarps IF currently plays in Division 3 Södra Götaland which is the fifth tier of Swedish football. They play their home matches at the Åkarps IP in Åkarp.

The club is affiliated to Skånes Fotbollförbund.
