= Oxelösunds IK =

Swedish football club

- Full name: Oxelösunds Idrottsklubb
- Founded: 1984
- Ground: Ramdalens IP; Oxelösund; Sweden
- League: Division 5 Södermanland Gul
- 2010: Division 4 Södermanland
Home colours

Oxelösunds IK is a Swedish association football club located in Oxelösund in Södermanland County.

== Background ==
Oxelösunds Idrottsklubb is a Swedish sports club founded on 10 January 1984 following the merger of IFK Oxelösund and Oxelösunds SK. The club competes in football. The bandy section was cancelled due to the city deciding to build a new football field instead of repairing the broken bandy field. Bandy was previously the city's most successful sport, the team played in Division 2. Kalle Spjuth now of Hammarby IF and Markus Hillukkala of Bollnäs GIF are two of their most famous past players, they were both youth products of the club.

Since their foundation Oxelösunds IK has participated mainly in the middle and lower divisions of the Swedish football league system. The club currently plays in Division 5 Södermanland Gul which is the seventh tier of Swedish football. They play their home matches at Ramdalens IP in Oxelösund.

Oxelösunds IK are affiliated to the Södermanlands Fotbollförbund.

== Season to season ==
Season	Level	Division	Section	Position	Movements
1993	Tier 5	Division 4	Södermanland	7th	
1994	Tier 5	Division 4	Södermanland	8th	
1995	Tier 5	Division 4	Södermanland	3rd	
1996	Tier 5	Division 4	Södermanland	1st	Promoted
1997	Tier 4	Division 3	Östra Svealand	8th	
1998	Tier 4	Division 3	Östra Svealand	8th	
1999	Tier 4	Division 3	Östra Svealand	9th	Relegated
2000	Tier 5	Division 4	Södermanland	7th	
2001	Tier 5	Division 4	Södermanland	9th	
2002	Tier 5	Division 4	Södermanland	3rd	
2003	Tier 5	Division 4	Södermanland	9th	
2004	Tier 5	Division 4	Södermanland	8th	
2005	Tier 5	Division 4	Södermanland	6th	
2006*	Tier 6	Division 4	Södermanland	1st	Promoted
2007	Tier 5	Division 3	Östra Svealand	12th	Relegated
2008	Tier 6	Division 4	Södermanland	11th	Relegated
2009	Tier 7	Division 5	Södermanland	11th	
2010	Tier 7	Division 5	Södermanland Gul	6th	
2011	Tier 7	Division 5	Södermanland Gul	2nd	Promotion Playoffs

* League restructuring in 2006 resulted in a new division being created at Tier 3 and subsequent divisions dropping a level.

== Attendances ==
In recent seasons Oxelösunds IK have had the following average attendances:

Season	Average attendance	Division / Section	Level
2006	Not available	Div 4 Södermanland	Tier 6
2007	146	Div 3 Östra Svealand	Tier 5
2008	Not available	Div 4 Södermanland	Tier 6
2009	63	Div 5 Södermanland	Tier 7
2010	73	Div 5 Södermanland Gul	Tier 7

* Attendances are provided in the Publikliga sections of the Svenska Fotbollförbundet website.
