= SL X60 =

Series of electric commuter trains

X60
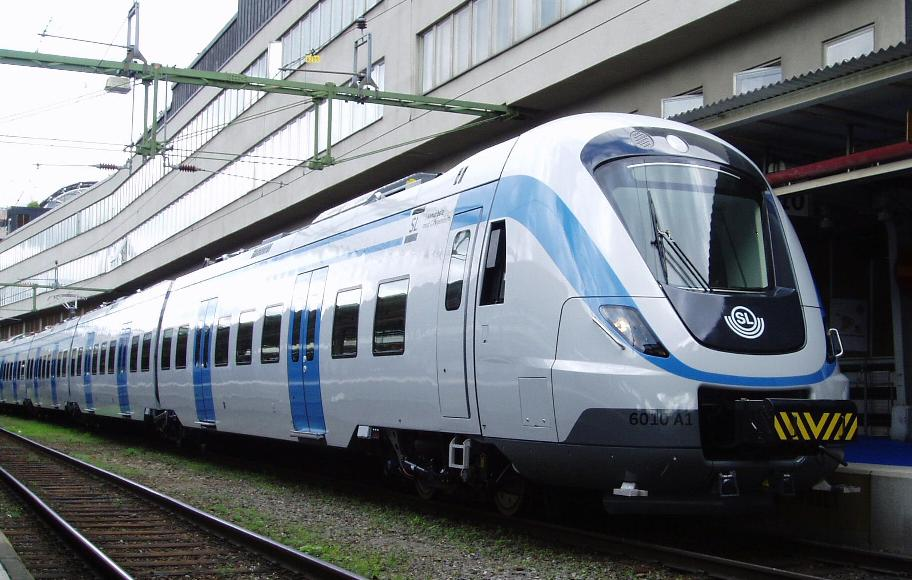
- X60 commuter train at Stockholm Central Station

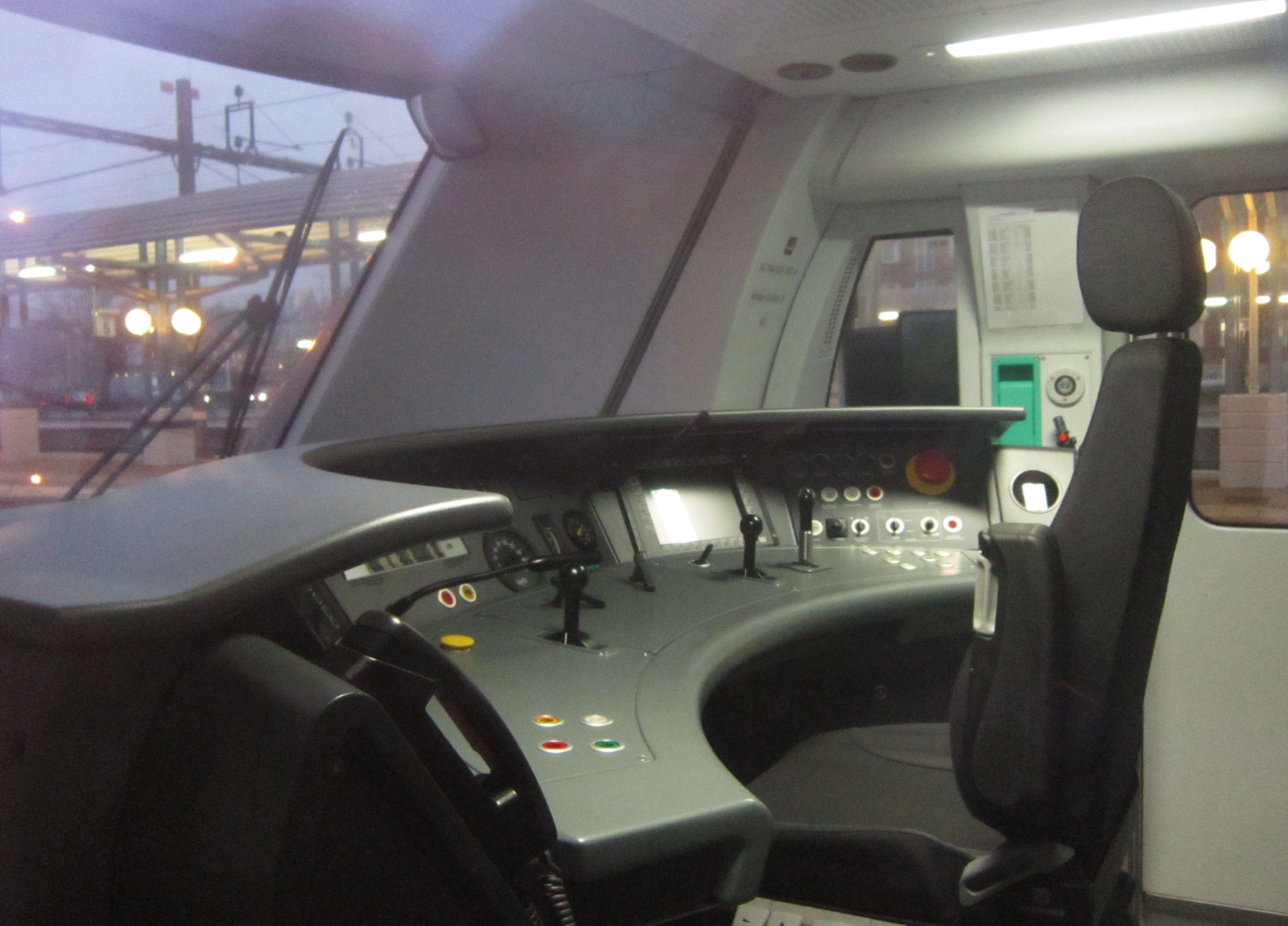
- Östgötatrafiken X61 driving cab
- In service: 2005–present
- Manufacturer: Alstom
- Built at: Alstom Transport Deutschland GmbH, Salzgitter, Lower Saxony, Germany
- Family name: Coradia Nordic
- Replaced: X1, X10, X420
- Constructed: 2005–present
- Entered service: 13 August 2005
- Number under construction: 46
- Number built: 83
- Formation: 6 cars per trainset
- Capacity: 374
- Operator: SJ AB (under contract from Storstockholms Lokaltrafik)
- Depots: Älvsjö, Bro, Södertälje
- Line served: Stockholm commuter rail

Specifications
- Train length: 107.1 m (351 ft 4 1/2 in)
- Width: 3.258 m (10 ft 8 1/4 in)
- Height: 4.280 m (14 ft 1/2 in)
- Floor height: 760 mm (2 ft 5 7/8 in) on 92%
- Doors: 2 per car
- Maximum speed: 160 km/h (100 mph)
- Weight: 206 t (203 long tons; 227 short tons)
- Traction motors: 8–12 × 250 kW (340 hp)
- Power output: 2–3 MW (2,700–4,000 hp)
- Acceleration: 1.12 m/s^{2} (3.7 ft/s^{2}) from 0–80 km/h (0–50 mph)
- Electric system: 15 kV 16 2/3 Hz AC (nominal) from overhead catenary
- Current collection: Pantograph
- UIC classification: X60: Bo′(Bo)′(2)′(Bo)′(Bo)′(Bo)′Bo′; X61/X62: Bo′(Bo)′(2)′(Bo)′Bo′
- Safety systems: ATC-2, ERTMS/ETCS
- Track gauge: 1,435 mm (4 ft 8 1/2 in) standard gauge

X60 is a series of Alstom Coradia Nordic 6-car articulated electric multiple units operated by Storstockholms Lokaltrafik (SL) on the Stockholm commuter rail network. They were manufactured by the French manufacturer Alstom at their plant in Salzgitter, Germany between 2005 and 2017, and replaced all older X10 units.

== Background ==
The original cars for the Stockholm commuter rail service, called X1, were delivered between 1967 and 1975. A batch of new cars, designated X10, were delivered between 1983 and 1993. These two sets of cars made up the backbone of the fleet from 1967 until 2005. As time went on and passengers demanded more comfortable travel and more features, SL came to realize that it was time to replace the older stock completely. The Regina model by Bombardier Transportation was originally considered, but was factored out due to poor acceleration and the lack of entrance doors, leading to the development of the brand-new X60 model.

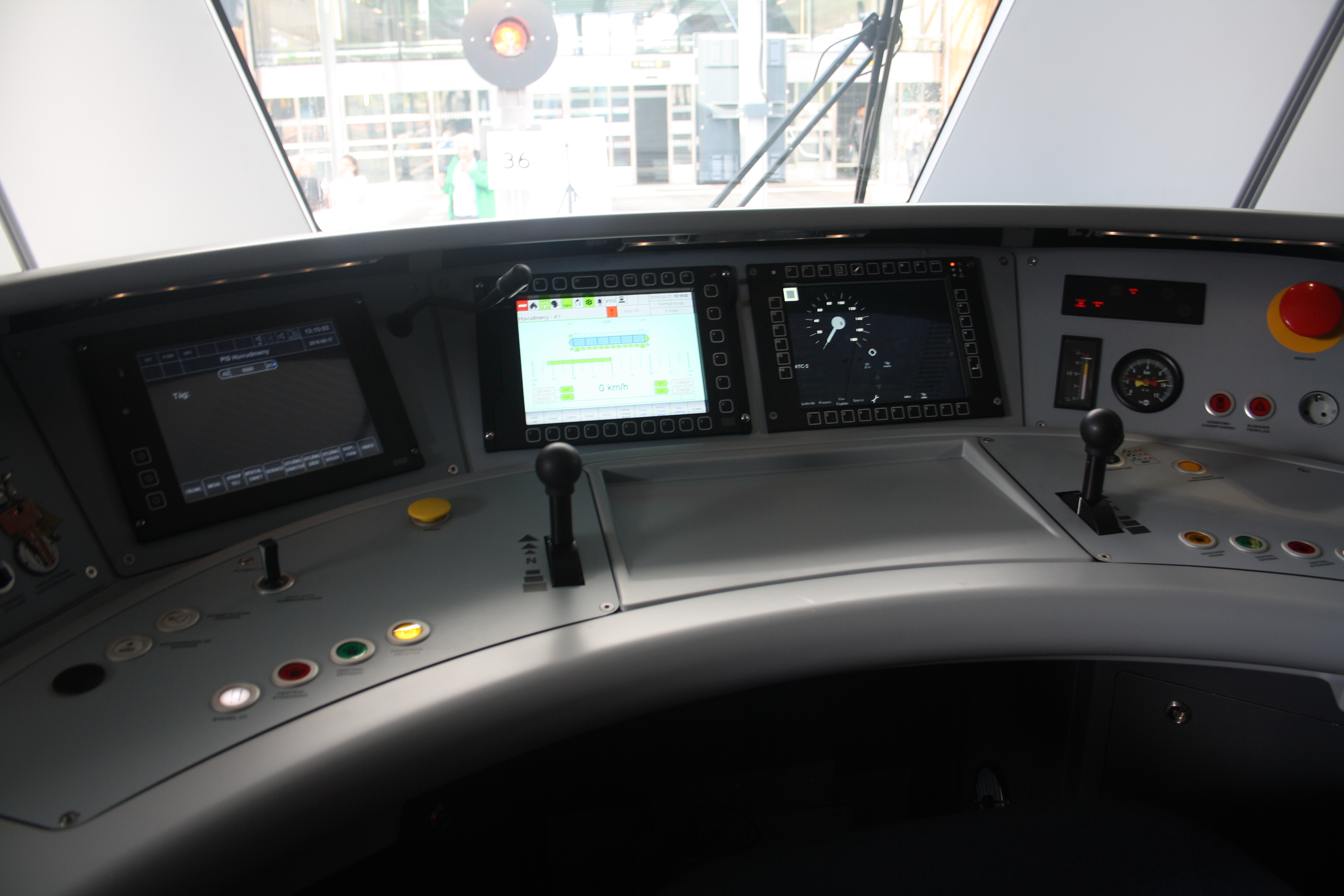
The driving cab of the X60B is equipped with ERTMS/ETCS, which is to be installed on the X60/X60A

Delivery of the first 71 X60 sets took place from 2005 to 2008, and a further 12 identical units followed in 2012 with the designation X60A. These trains have been replacing the older stock as they are delivered. Service with the X60 was inaugurated on 13 August 2005 at Stockholm Central Station.

Since 2016, 46 new sets, designated as X60B, are being added to the fleet. They are similar to the X60 and X60A but have several new components, including support for ERTMS/ETCS signalling equipment, which is planned to be installed in the new Citybanan tunnel and the rest of the commuter train network. For this reason, the X60B cannot be connected to the older X60 and X60A until the older trains have received the new onboard computer.

The X60B cars are required because of the need to withdraw the older X10 cars, as the Citybanan stations have platform doors which are adopted to the X60, X60A and X60B, and all trains using the tunnel needed to have their doors on the same distance from each other as the original X60.

== Safety and comfort ==
Each train set is 107 metres (351 feet 5/8 inch) long and consists of six articulated cars. Each car can seat 374 and take 530 standees. Two such units coupled together make up a full-length train. It is easy to go through the entire car to find an empty seat, or to move if one part of the unit is crowded, and the design also provides visibility through the length of the car, which SL's passenger surveys found was important in order to help passengers feel safe. SL has also specified lower backrests in the X60 to improve visibility all the way through the car.

Boarding and alighting from the new train is intended to be much easier than doing so on the older commuter train stock. At each door, and in 92% of each car, the floor is at the same level as the station platforms. This means a significant quality improvement for all passengers but particularly for the mobility-impaired.

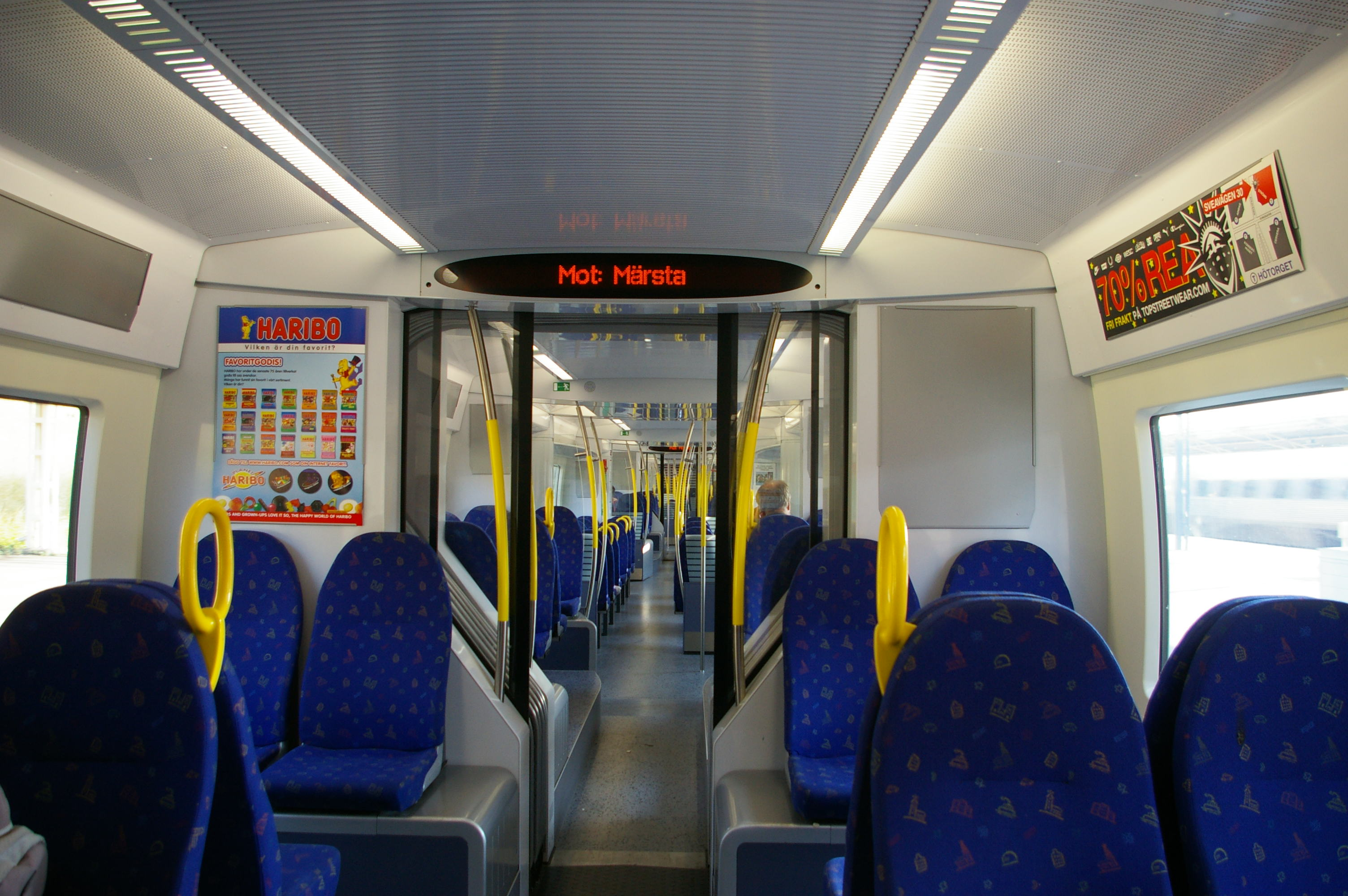
X60 interior

The actual technical parameters include 92% of the total floor space of each car having a floor height of 760 mm (30 in) rising to 830 mm (33 in) at the gangways, and a maximum floorheight anywhere in the wagons of 1,080 mm (43 in). The trains can travel at speeds of up to 160 km/h (99 mph) although they are only actually used at speeds of up to 140 km/h (87 mph) in Stockholm - a speed of 80 km/h (50 mph) is reached within 20 seconds. The trains have a width of 3.258 m (10 ft 8 1/4 in) and a height of 4.280 m (14 ft 1/2 in) above TOR, and a full length of 107.1 m (351 ft 4 9/16 in).

The train is built in accord with the new nominal platform height of 800 millimetres (31 in) specified for Stockholm commuter trains, higher than the normal Swedish Railway Administration's standard of 500 millimetres (20 in). Passengers notice a significant improvement in the form of a much lower floor height compared to the earlier stock, making boarding and alighting much easier than before.

In each car there are "flexible areas" that have room for wheelchairs, baby carriages and bicycles.

Another new feature is that the trains are equipped with air conditioning in both the passenger and cab areas. The seats have been designed in collaboration with leading ergonomists and representatives for SL passengers.

All cars have security cameras installed, just like the new Stockholm Metro cars; this can contribute to increased security. Naturally, other safety details have also been carefully worked out, such as fire safety, with the use of nonflammable and self-extinguishing materials.

X60-6009+6069 arrival at Stockholm Central Station

X60-6060+6019 on Centralbron

== Higher environmental standards ==
High environmental standards have shaped the choice of materials in the new commuter trains. 95% of a car can be recycled when they are ready to be scrapped.

When the trains brake, the 3-phase motors act as generators and return electricity to the system rather than converting power to heat, as on a friction brake system. The current that is produced is conducted back to the overhead lines. If there is another train in the same electrical section, this train will use as much of the generated energy as it can.

The trains are designed and built for Swedish weather conditions; This is done by utilizing the roof space for the traction /air supply and auxiliary power converters, rather than placing them underneath the unit. This means they suffer less from snow and ice accumulation, and it should be possible to operate them without service disruptions both in heavy snow and in hot summers (X1 and X10 had problems with the heavy snowfall and froze, disabling them seriously). The technical systems in the train are "doubled," i.e. redundancy is provided, using microprocessor control systems, which greatly reduces the risk of service disruptions.

== X61 ==
X61 is the name of the Alstom Coradia Nordic railcar, which was ordered by Skånetrafiken, the regional public transport organisation in Scania, operate 99 X61 trainsets, of which the first batch of 49 trainsets were delivered 2009–2011. An additional 20 trainsets were ordered in 2011 and in 2017 further 30 trainsets were ordered. The X61 is based on the SL X60, but with four cars per set instead of six and a total length of 75 m (246 ft), and are operated both as single trainsets and as longer trains made up of two connected four-car trainsets (and it is also possible to use three connected four-car trainsets to get even longer trains). The interior of the X61 is better suited for the often longer distances covered by regional trains, with toilets (which the SL X60 commuter trains do not have) and more comfortable seats. Östgötatrafiken (the public transport organisation in Östergötland) has bought 5 trains of type X61, delivered in 2010, and has ordered eight more, which was delivered 2015. Västtrafik (the public transport organisation in Västra Götaland) has bought 22 X61 trains.

== X62 (Norrtåg) ==
Norrtåg (the train ownership company for the public transport organisations in Västerbotten, Västernorrland and neighbour counties) has bought eleven trains of this type for usage in these counties, e.g. on Botniabanan, delivered in 2012. They are called X62 and contain a bistro because of longer travel times, and have a top speed of 180 km/h (112 mph). They have four passenger doors per side versus six or seven for X61. Otherwise, they are quite the same as X61 trains and it is also possible to make two or three connected four-car trainsets to get longer trains.

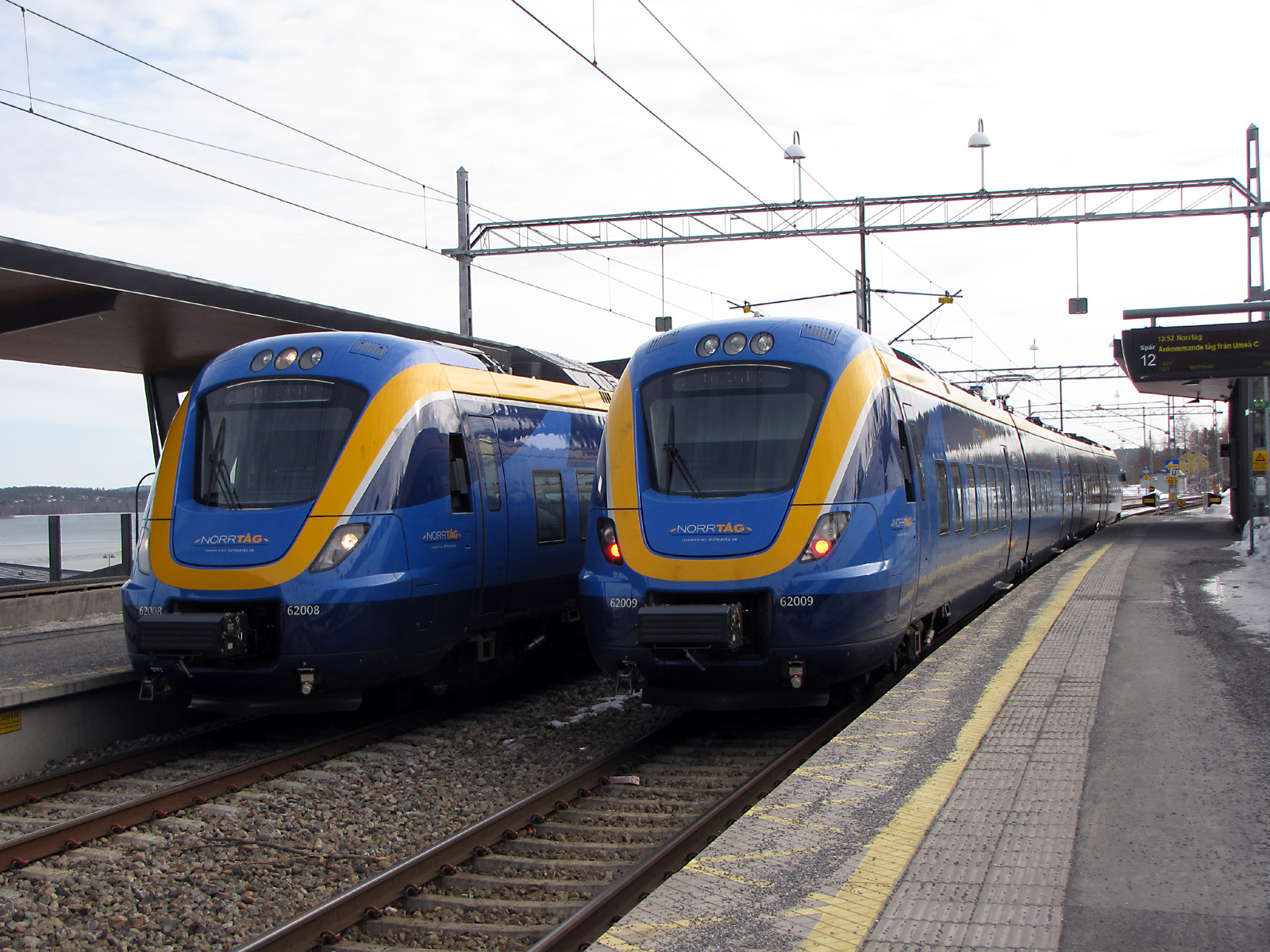
Norrtåg X62 trains at Örnsköldsvik Central Station

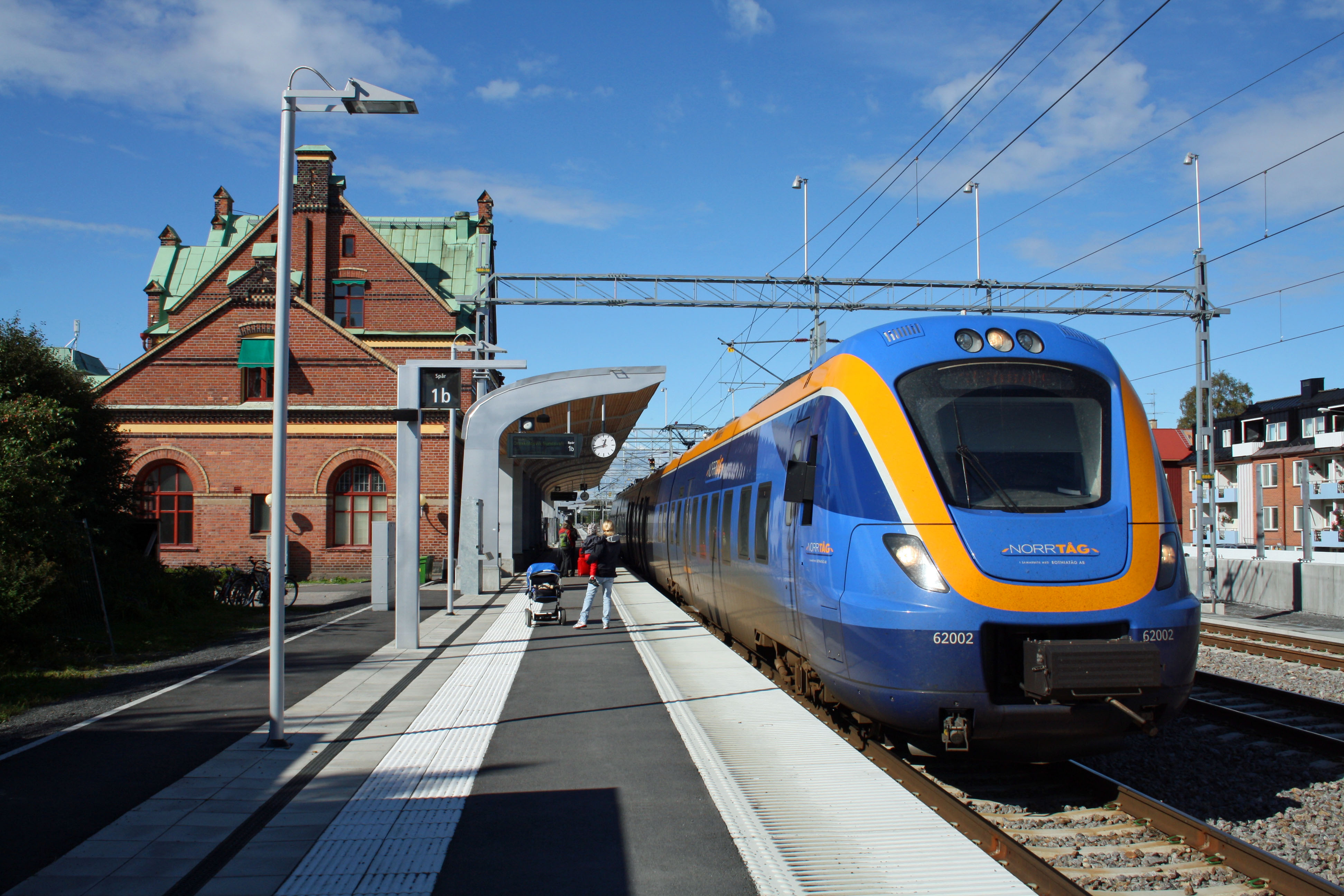
Norrtåg's X62 002 at Umeå C in 2012
