= Transitio =

Swedish train leasing company

AB Transitio
- Company type: Limited company
- Industry: Rail vehicle leasing
- Founded: 1999
- Headquarters: Stockholm, Sweden
- Area served: Sweden
- Key people: Magnus von Bahr (CEO)
- Products: Rail vehicle leasing, procurement, financing, management
- Owners: 20 Swedish regional public transport authorities
- Website: www.transitio.se

AB Transitio is a Swedish rail leasing company owned by Sweden's regional public transport authorities. Its main role is to procure, finance, and manage rail vehicles for use in regional and commuter rail services across Sweden. This model's aim is to enable its owners to avoid the high costs and long delivery times of direct train purchases, and to standardise rolling stock between operators.

Most trains are leased from external finance companies, with Transitio as the lessee, though it owns a limited number directly. Vehicles managed by Transitio carry the owner code "ABTR".

== History and operations ==
Transitio was established in 1999 as a response to the reorganisation of Sweden’s railway sector, which shifted responsibility for regional rail services from the state operator, SJ, to subsidised regional authorities. The company acts as a partner, supporting its owners throughout the lifecycle of rail vehicles, from procurement and financing to maintenance and fleet renewal.

Transitio negotiates framework agreements with manufacturers with bulk purchases and standardisation of requirements, aiming to lower purchase costs and simplify maintenance. Transitio’s financing often involves complex leasing arrangements, sometimes using international finance structures.

== Fleet ==
As of 2025, Transitio manages a fleet of 189 rail vehicles, operating across much of Sweden’s railway network. The main types of trains in the fleet are:

Model	Type	Manufacturer	Quantity	Years delivered	Image
Regina (X50–X54)	Electric multiple unit	Bombardier	63	2000–2011	
Contessa (X31)	Electric multiple unit	Bombardier	11	2005–2012	
Itino (Y31, Y32)	Diesel multiple unit	Bombardier	12	2002–2010	
Coradia (X60, X61, X62)	Electric multiple unit	Alstom	12	2011–2012	
X11/X14	Electric multiple unit	ASEA	33 (28 X11, 5 X14)	1982–1995	
Dosto (ER1)	Double-decker electric multiple unit	Stadler	60	2019–2021	
Civity Nordic (ER3, BIR1)	Electric/hybrid multiple unit	CAF	28	2025–2027 (deliveries from)	

== Owners ==
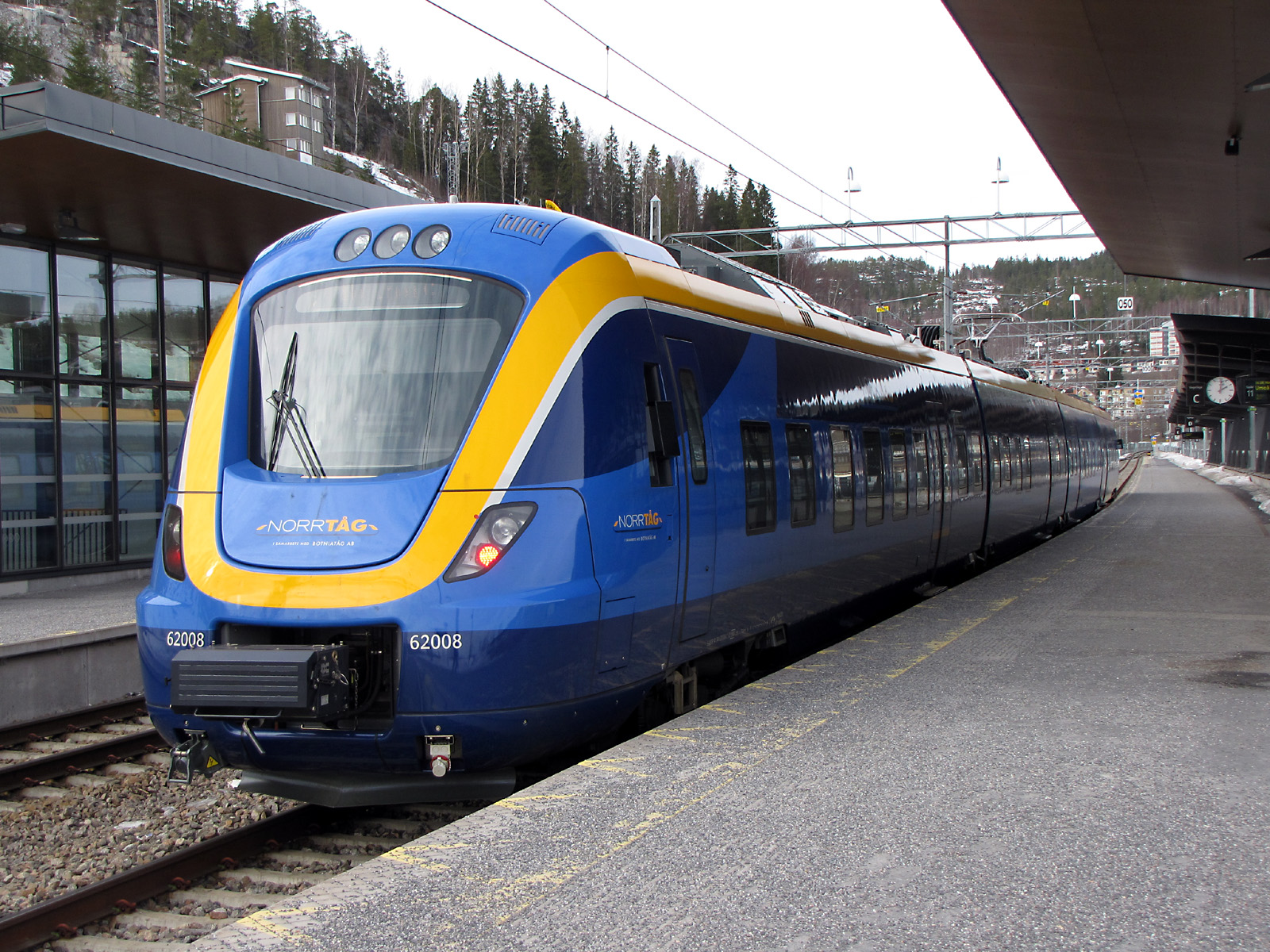
Norrtåg X62 owned by Transitio

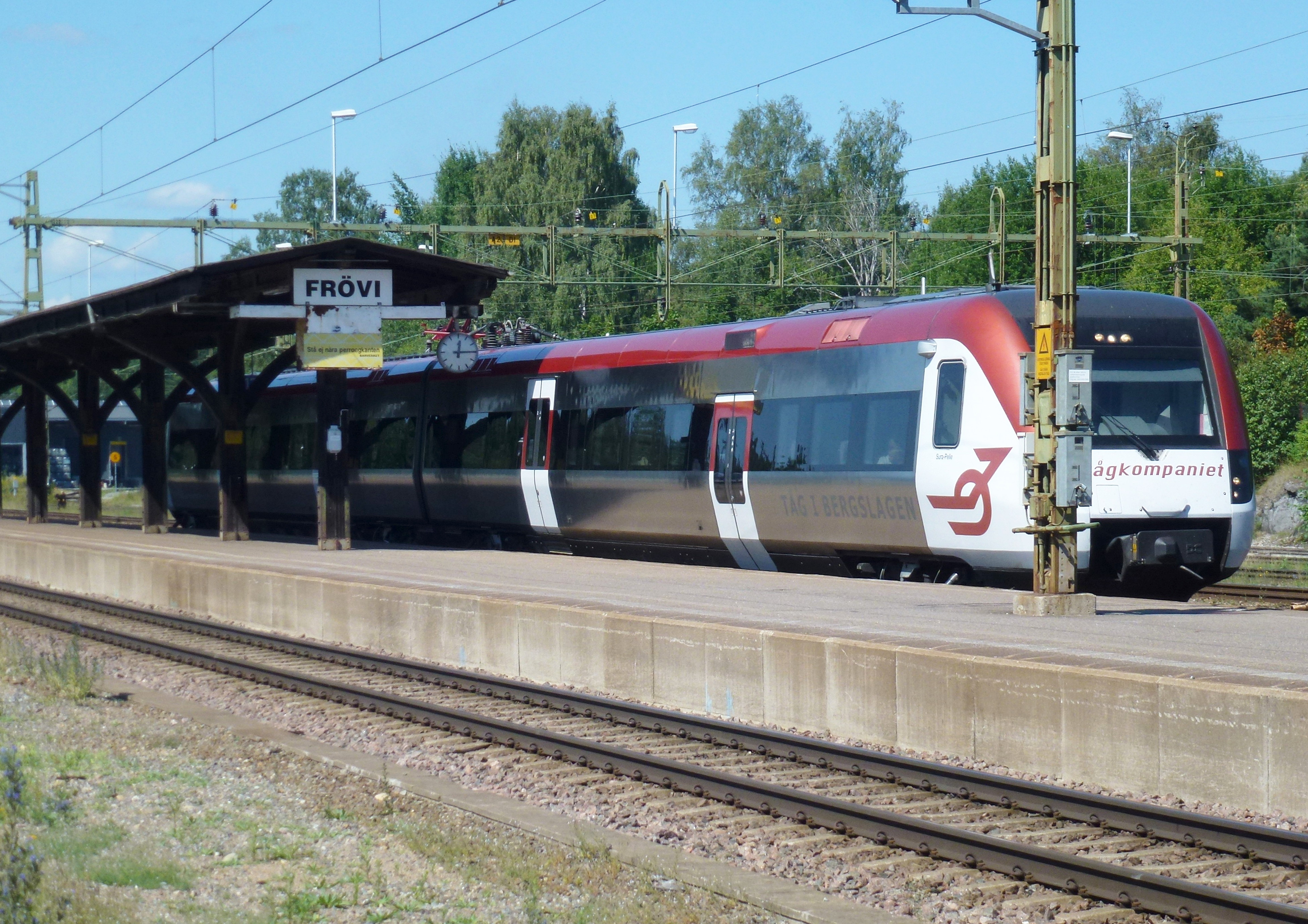
Tåg i Bergslagen Regina owned by Transitio

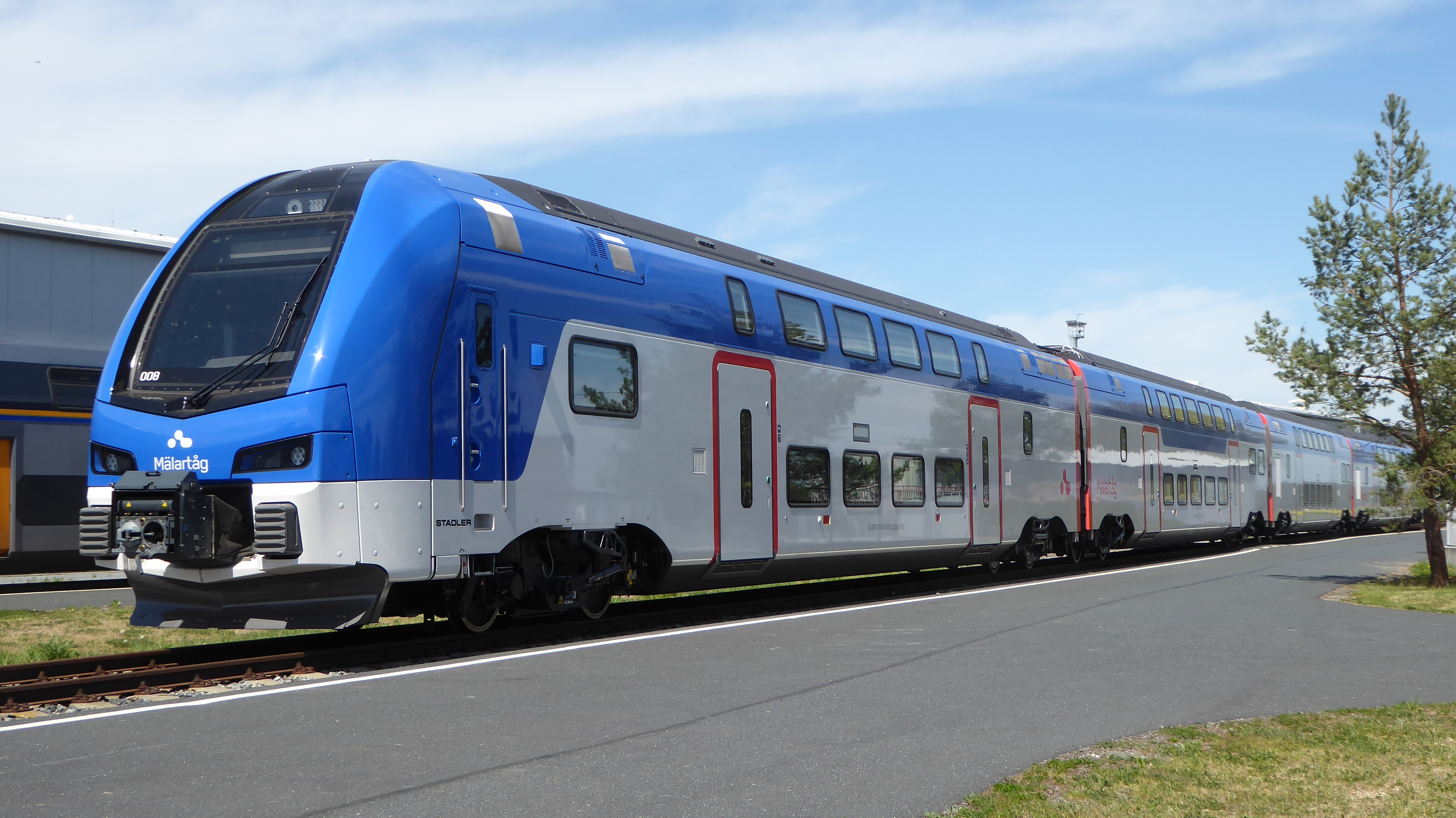
Mälartåg ER1 (KISS) owned by Transitio

Transitio is owned by the following regional public transport authorities:

- Region Blekinge
- Region Dalarna
- Region Gävleborg
- Region Halland
- Region Jämtland Härjedalen
- Region Jönköping
- Region Kalmar
- Region Kronoberg
- Region Skåne
- Region Stockholm
- Region Sörmland
- Region Uppsala
- Region Värmland
- Region Västerbotten
- Region Västernorrland
- Region Västmanland
- Region Västra Götaland
- Region Örebro Län
- Region Östergötland
- Regionala kollektivtrafikmyndigheten i Norrbotten

== See also ==
- Rail transport in Sweden
- SJ - Sweden's primary passenger train operator, which owns rolling stock separately from Transitio's operations
- SL - the organisation responsible for managing public transport in Stockholm County, which owns rolling stock separately from Transitio's operations
- Norske tog – a similar organisation in Norway
