= SJ X14 =

X14
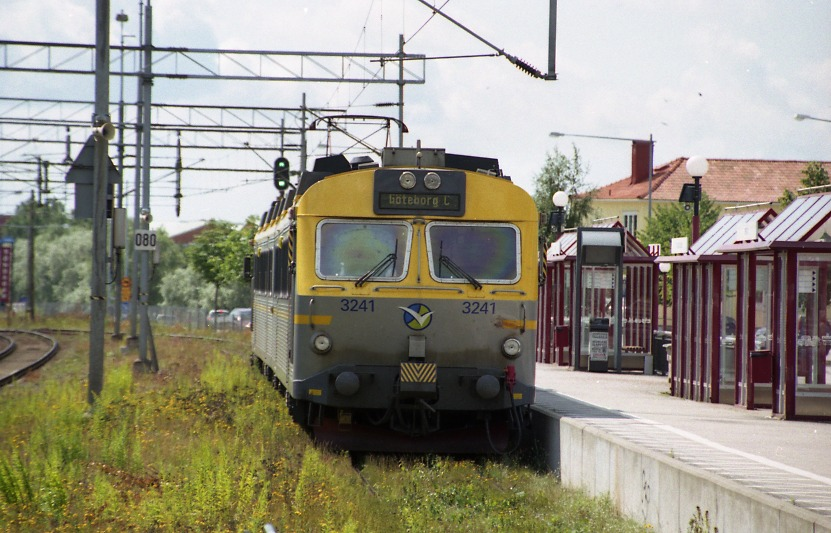
- A X14 at Stenungsund.

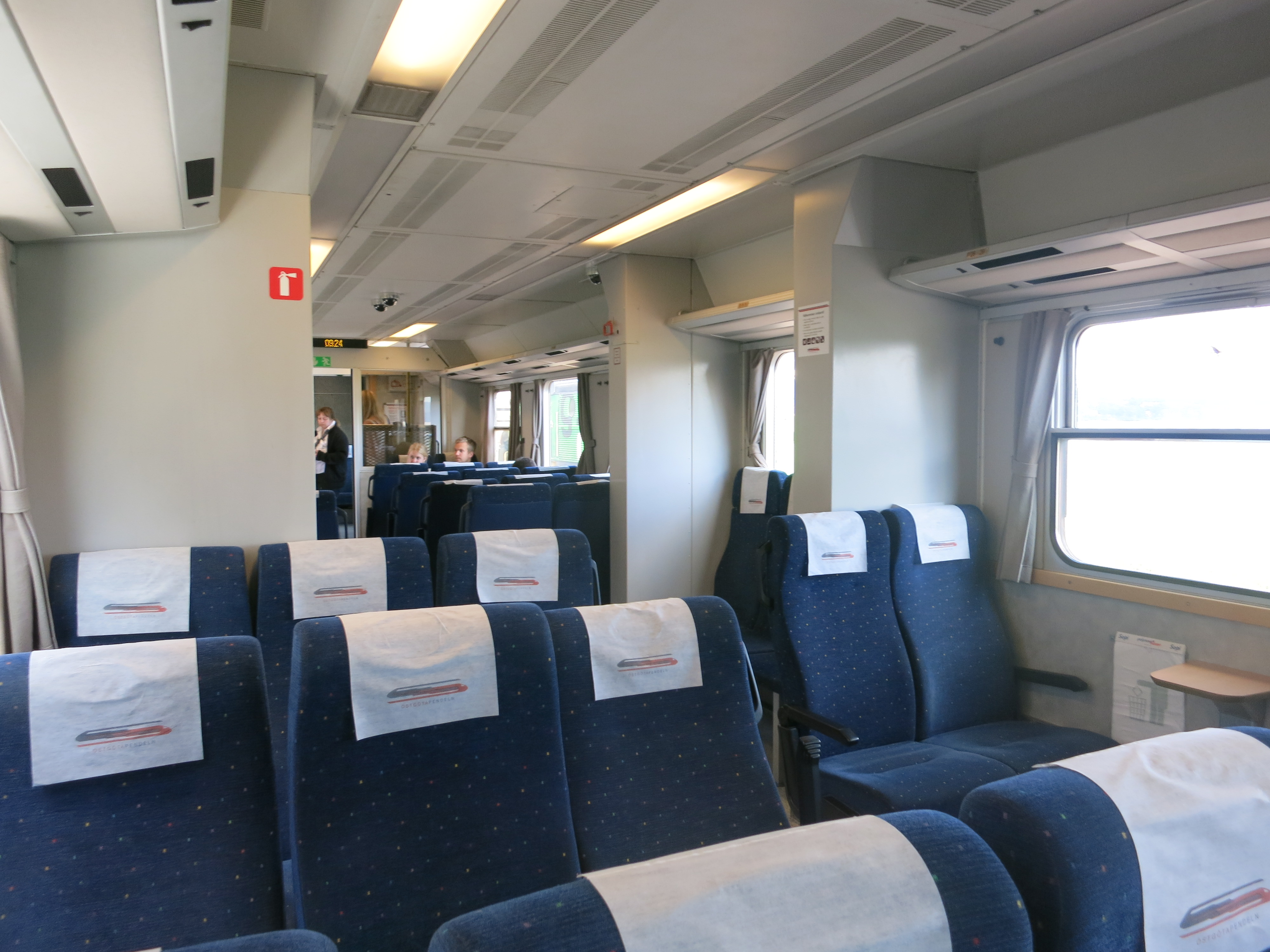
- The interior of X14 3233 in 2013
- Stock type: Electric multiple unit
- In service: 1994–present
- Manufacturer: Asea Brown Boveri (ABB)
- Constructed: 1994–1995 (1991, 1994)
- Number built: 18
- Successor: X61 (Östgötatrafiken); ER1 (Tåg i Bergslagen)
- Formation: 2 cars
- Fleet numbers: 3224-3241 (3190, 3223)
- Capacity: 123 + 13 (Krösatågen); 116 + 27 (Västtågen)
- Operators: Västtrafik; Krösatågen

Specifications
- Train length: 49,868 mm (163 ft 7.3 in)
- Car length: 24,934 mm (81 ft 9.7 in)
- Width: 3,080 mm (10 ft 1.3 in)
- Doors: 2 doors per car
- Maximum speed: 160 km/h (100 mph)
- Weight: 103 tonnes (101 long tons; 114 short tons)
- Power output: 1,280 kW (1,720 hp)
- Electric system(s): 15 kV 16.7 Hz AC catenary
- Current collection: Pantograph
- UIC classification: Bo'Bo'+2'2'
- Seating: transversal + Longitudinal folding seats
- Track gauge: 1,435 mm (4 ft 8 1/2 in)

X14 is a series of two-car electric multiple units built by Asea Brown Boveri between 1994 and 1995. Based on the older X12-series 18 units were built originally with two units converted from X12 later being converted to X14. The X14 is similar to the X12 having an interior adapted for regional travel, differences from the X12 include two instead of one door per car and having a one class interior from the start.

The units have been used by many different operators originally being delivered to Länstrafiken i Skaraborg, Östgötatrafiken, Göteborgs Lokaltrafik and SJ. Six were used on the Vättertåg traffic from 1994 until 2010 when Västtrafik and Jönköpings Länstrafik took over the operations under the names Krösatågen and Västtågen. As of 2026 Västtrafik and Jönköpings Länstrafik are the only operators remaining after Tåg i Bergslagen retired them.

== Units status in 2026 ==
| Unit | Delivered as | Status |
|---|---|---|
| 3190 | X12 | Tåg i Bergslagen - name Dan Andersson |
| 3223 | X12 | Tåg i Bergslagen - namn Karin Larsson |
| 3224 | X14 | Västtrafik - in service |
| 3225 | X14 | Västtrafik - in service |
| 3226 | X14 | Västtrafik - in service |
| 3227 | X14 | Västtrafik - in service |
| 3228 | X14 | Västtrafik - in service |
| 3229 | X14 | Västtrafik - in service (Former Vättertåg) |
| 3230 | X14 | Krösatågen - in service |
| 3231 | X14 | Tåg i Bergslagen - namn Cajsa Warg |
| 3232 | X14 | Krösatågen - in service |
| 3233 | X14 | Krösatågen - in service |
| 3234 | X14 | Tåg i Bergslagen - namn Elsa Andersson |
| 3235 | X14 | Tåg i Bergslagen - namn Lennart Hellsing |
| 3236 | X14 | Krösatågen - in service |
| 3237 | X14 | Krösatågen - in service |
| 3238 | X14 | Västtrafik - in service |
| 3239 | X14 | Krösatågen - in service |
| 3240 | X14 | Västtrafik - in service |
| 3241 | X14 | Västtrafik - in service |
