= Huddinge railway station =

Railway station in Huddinge, Sweden

Huddinge
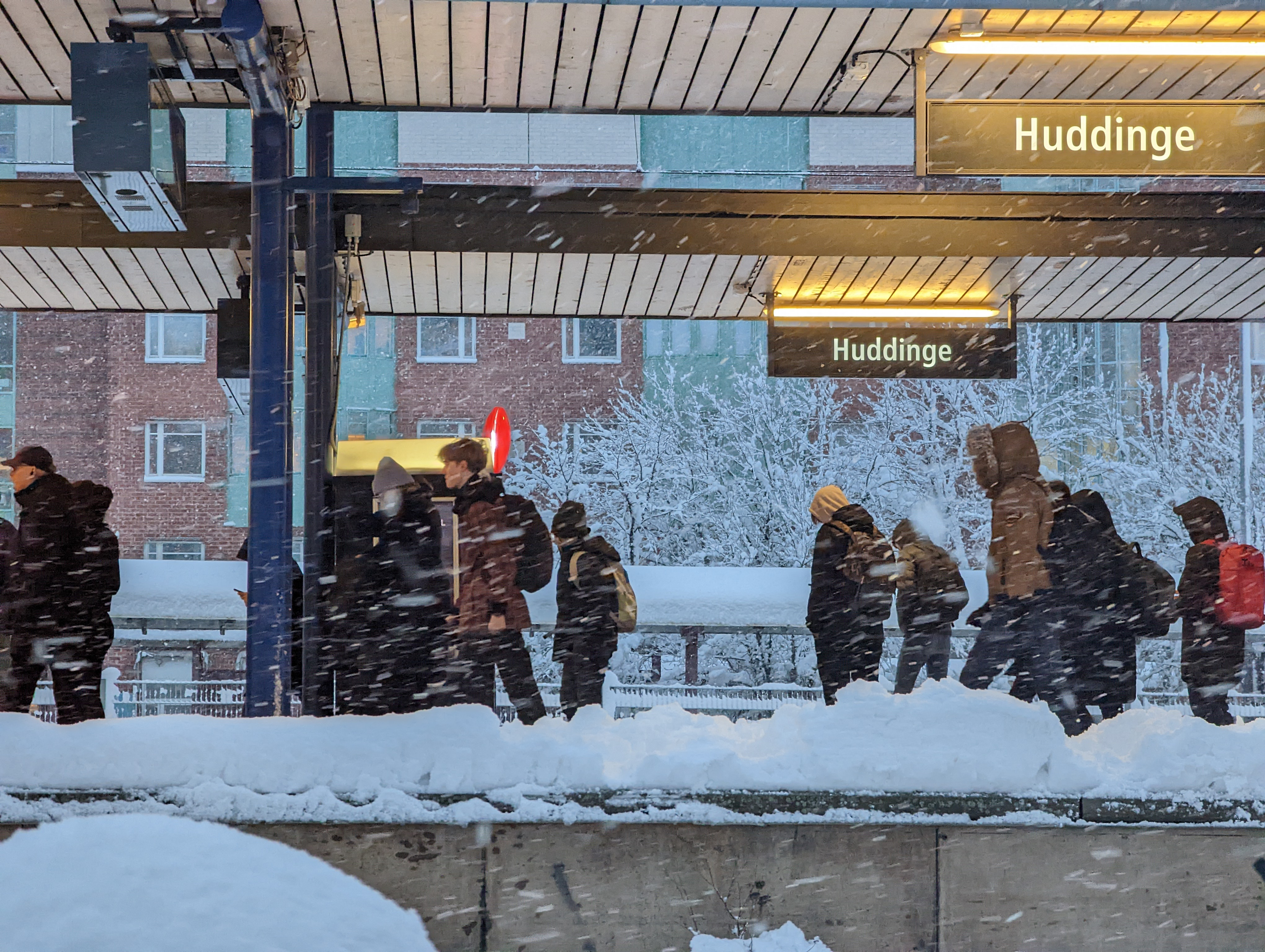
- Huddinge station in winter

General information
- Location: Stockholm County
- Coordinates: 59°14′10.82″N 17°58′43.5″E
- System: Pendeltåg
- Owner: Swedish Transport Administration
- Platforms: Island Platform
- Tracks: 4
- Connections: Bus terminal

Construction
- Structure type: At-grade

Other information
- Station code: Hu

History
- Opened: 1860 (current station 1986)

Services
Preceding station	Stockholm commuter rail	Following station
Stuvsta towards Uppsala C	40	Flemingsberg towards Södertälje Centrum
Stuvsta towards Märsta	41	Flemingsberg towards Södertälje Centrum
Location

Huddinge is a station on Stockholm's commuter rail network, located in central Huddinge Municipality between Stuvsta and Flemingsberg. The station consists of a single island platform with an underground pedestrian tunnel connecting to the bus terminal and Huddinge centrum. The outer tracks are used for other train traffic. The current station structure was completed in 1986.

== History ==
Huddinge station was established in 1860 as part of the Western Main Line between Stockholm Södra and Södertälje. The station's construction was initiated by Pehr Pettersson, then-owner of nearby manor Fullersta Gård, who donated land to Swedish State Railways (SJ) under the condition that a station would be built nearby.

Initially, the station featured separate northbound and southbound platforms extending in opposite directions from the original 1860 station building. This unique layout was replaced in 1986 with a single platform and a new station structure integrated with an underground passage with artwork. The old station building was demolished during this renovation.

In 1980, the old Huddinge station building was featured in the political thriller To Be a Millionaire, starring Gösta Ekman, Björn Gustafson, and Allan Edwall. The film's climactic scene took place on the station platform and inside the historic station building.

=== Development timeline ===
- 1903: Double track extended south from Huddinge to Rönninge.
- 1908: Double track extended north from Huddinge to Älvsjö station.
- 1926: Electrification completed.
- 1967: Storstockholms Lokaltrafik (SL) is formed and takes over all local rail services.
- 1987: Four-track expansion between Stuvsta and Huddinge.
- 1988: Four-track expansion between Huddinge and Flemingsberg.

== Gallery ==
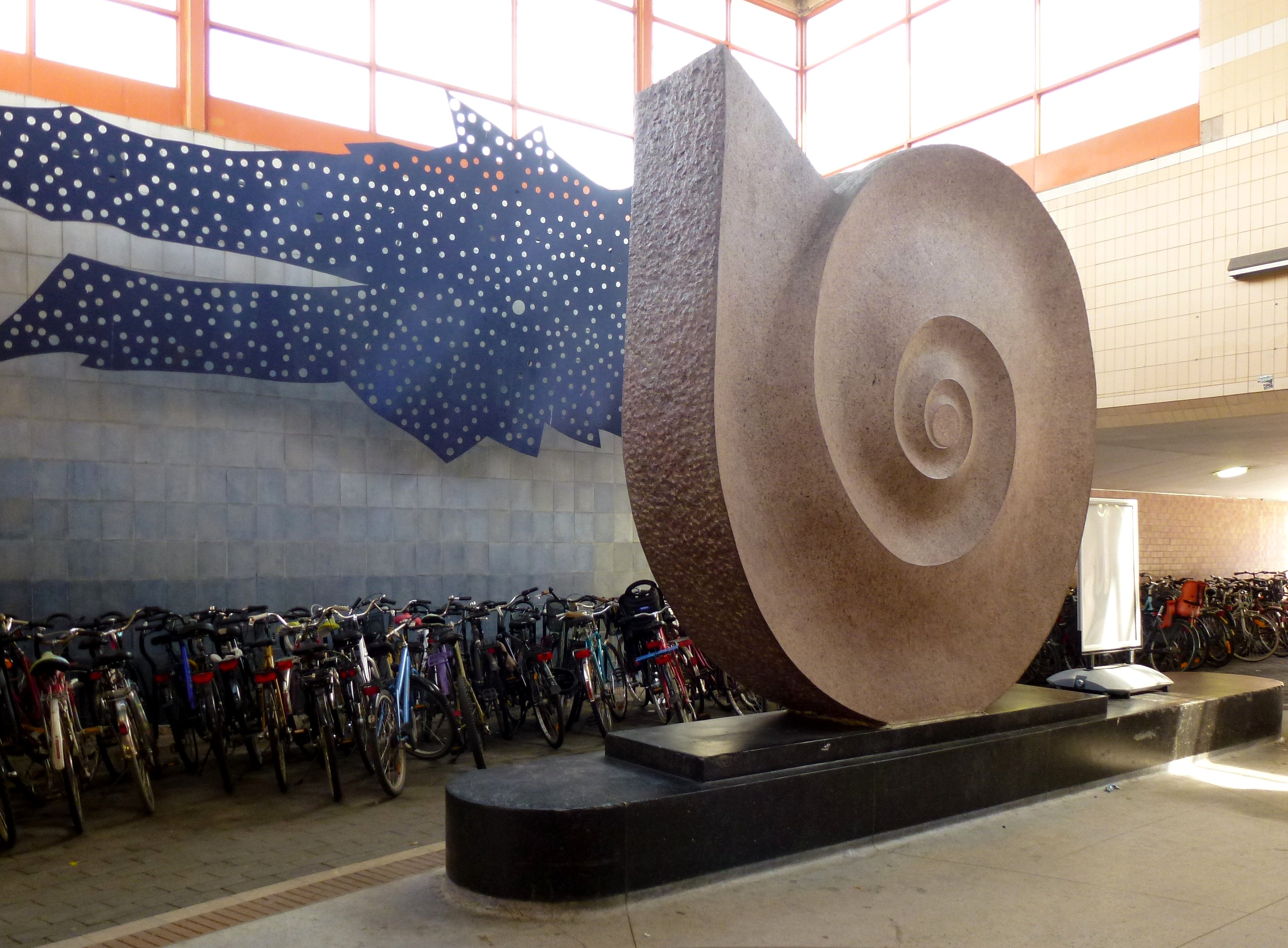
Nils G. Stenqvist's "Snäckfossil"

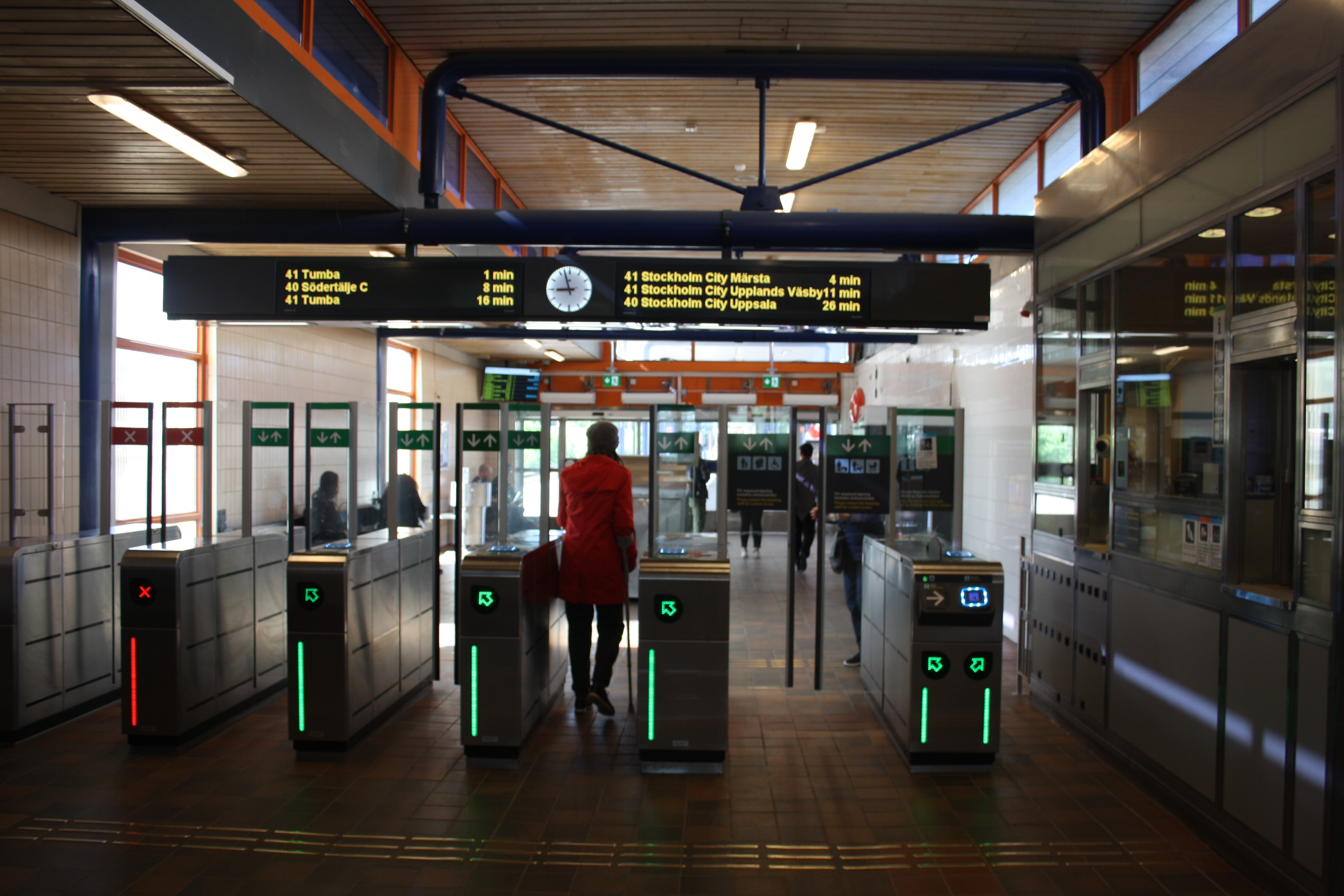
Ticket hall

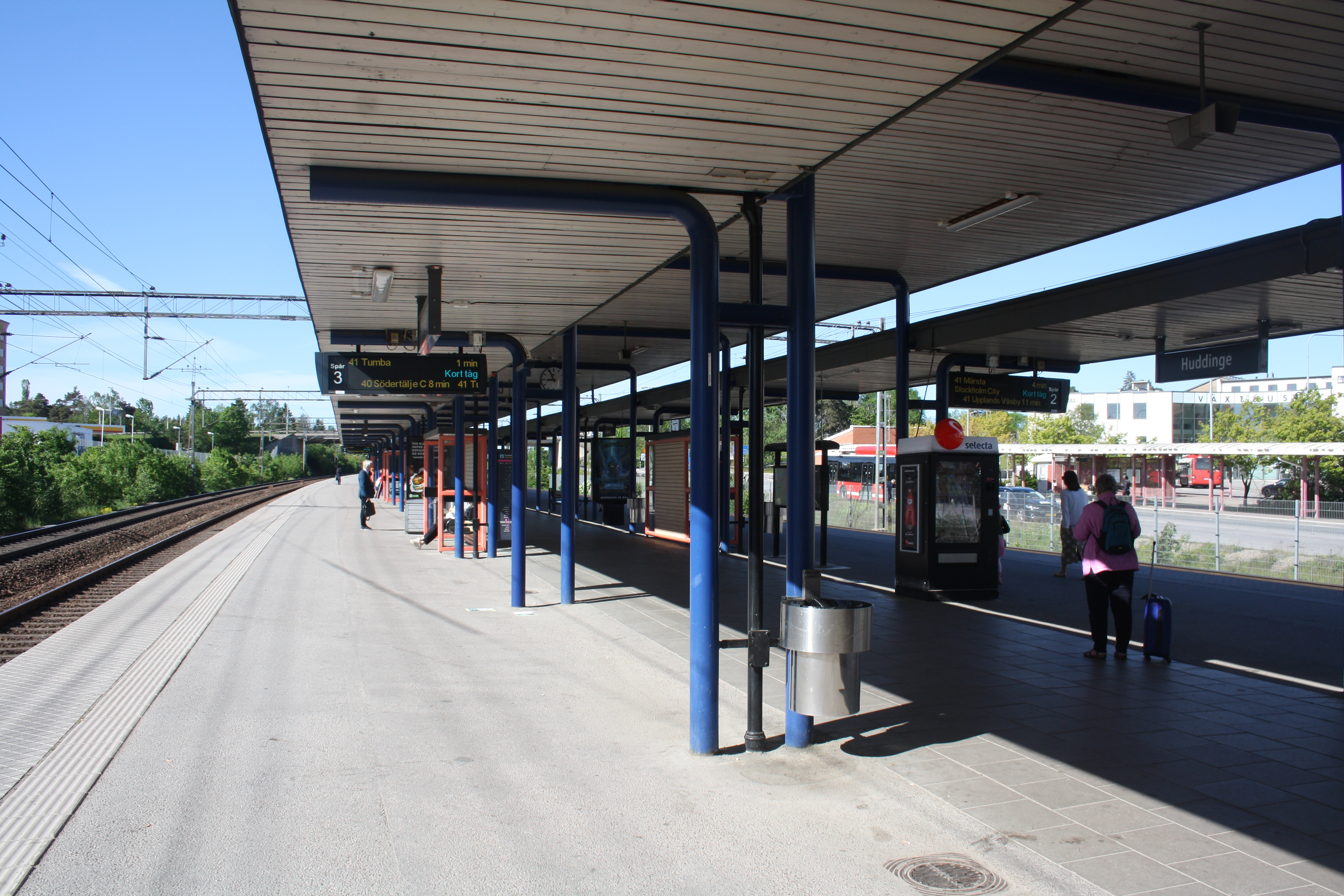
Platform

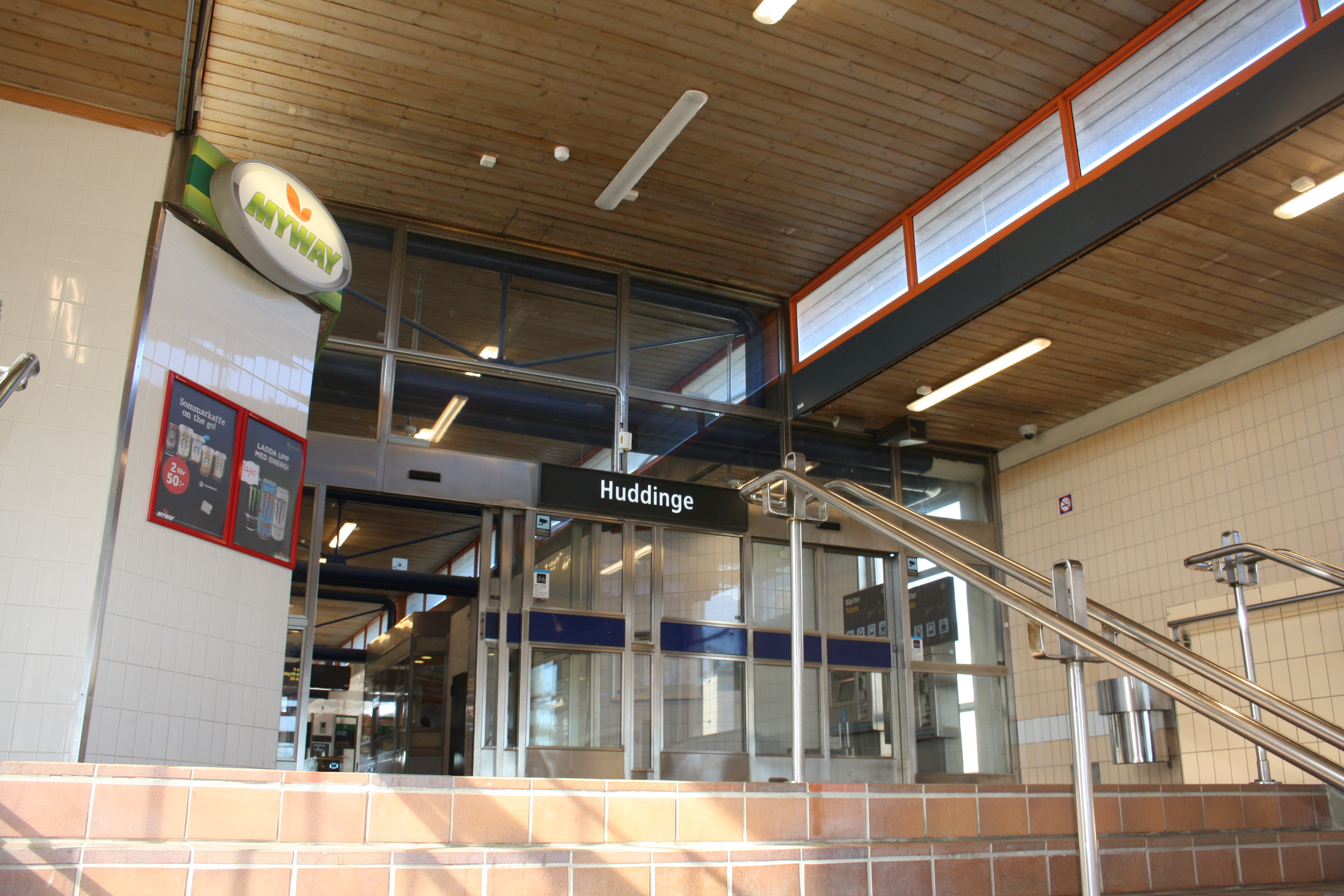
Entrance

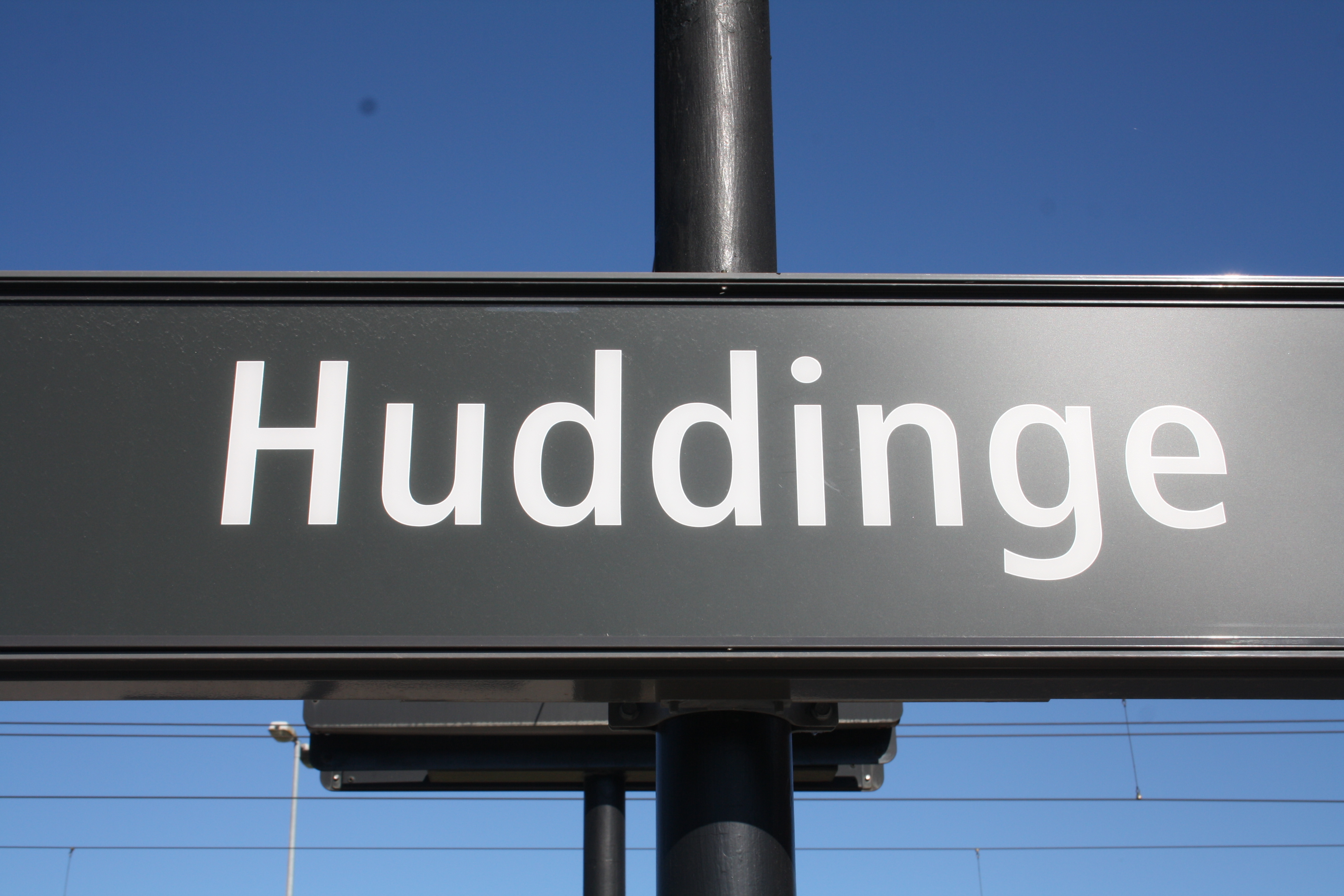
Station sig
