= Årstafältet metro station =

Future Stockholm Metro station

Årstafältet
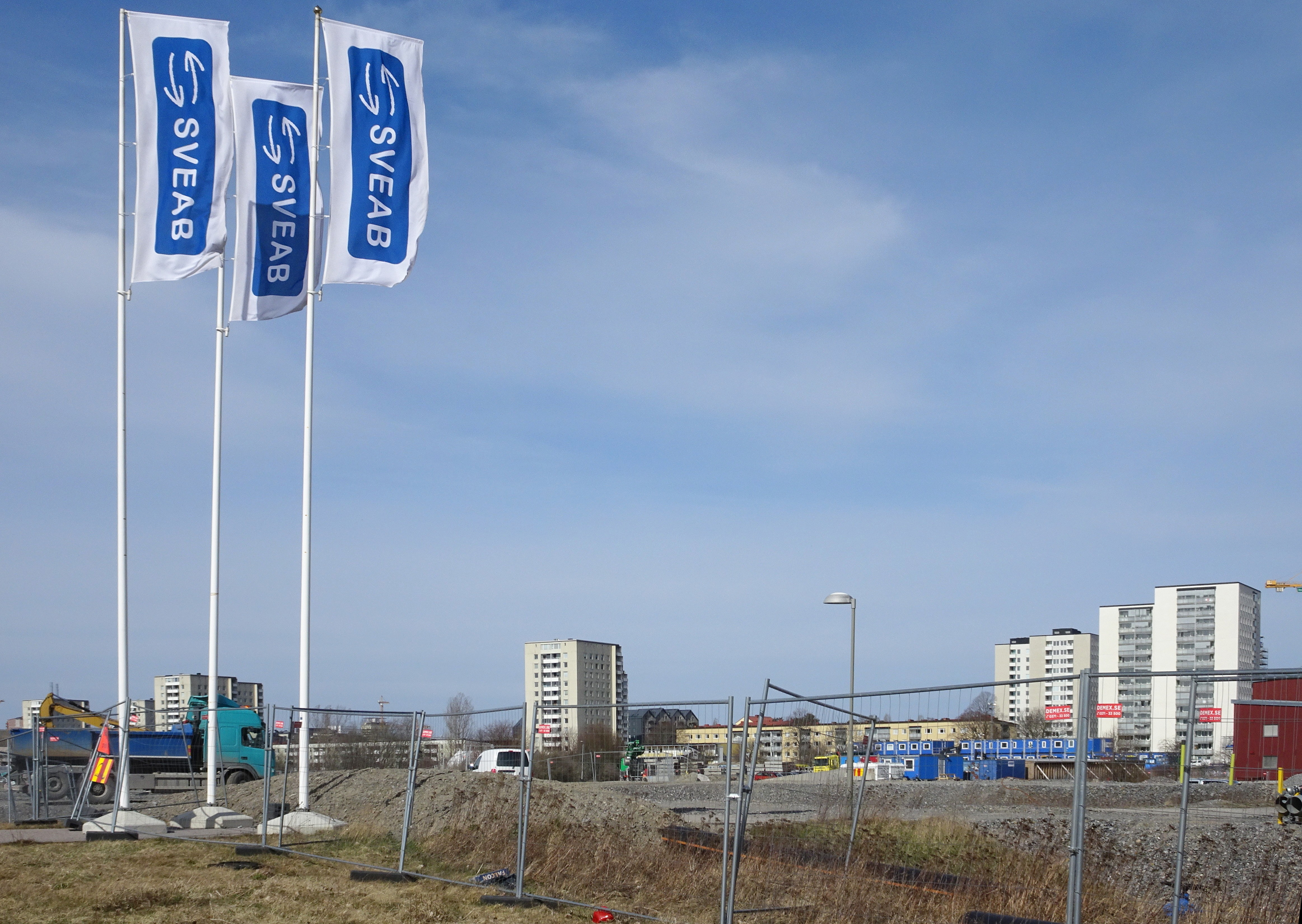
- Construction work in the Årstafältet area in 2020

General information
- Location: Årstafältet, Stockholm Municipality
- Coordinates: 59.294903°N 18.039204°E
- System: Future Stockholm Metro station
- Owner: Region Stockholm
- Transit authority: SL
- Line: Yellow Line
- Platforms: 1 island platform
- Tracks: 2
- Connections: Tvärbanan (Årstafältet)

Construction
- Structure type: Underground
- Depth: 48 m (157 ft)

History
- Opening: 2034

Services
Preceding station	Stockholm Metro	Following station
Årstaberg towards Fridhemsplan	Yellow Line	Östbergahöjden towards Älvsjö
Location

Årstafältet is a future underground station on the Yellow Line of the Stockholm Metro, expected to open in 2034. It will be situated in the new district of Årstafältet in southern Stockholm Municipality, between the planned stations Årstaberg and Östbergahöjden.

== Location and design ==
The station will be built 48 meters underground and will be accessed by six high-speed lifts connecting the street level with a mezzanine floor below street level. Along with the other new stations on the Yellow Line, Årstafältet will be equipped with platform screen doors.

Årstafältet metro station is a part of a broader urban development of a neighborhood in the Årstafältet area. The station entrance will be integrated into a new mixed-use block in the western part of Årstafältet, near a square and a park. The location will provide accessibility to the nearby Tvärbanan light rail stop, and to planned bus stops.

Travel time will be approximately 6.5 minutes to Fridhemsplan and 3.5 minutes to Älvsjö.

== Construction ==
Construction of the station is part of the Yellow Line extension between Fridhemsplan and Älvsjö. Construction is expected to begin in late 2025, starting with utility relocation before major excavation work begins. The entire Yellow Line is projected to be operational by 2034. WSP has been contracted to prepare the construction documents for the station.
