= Östbergahöjden metro station =

Future Stockholm Metro station

Östbergahöjden
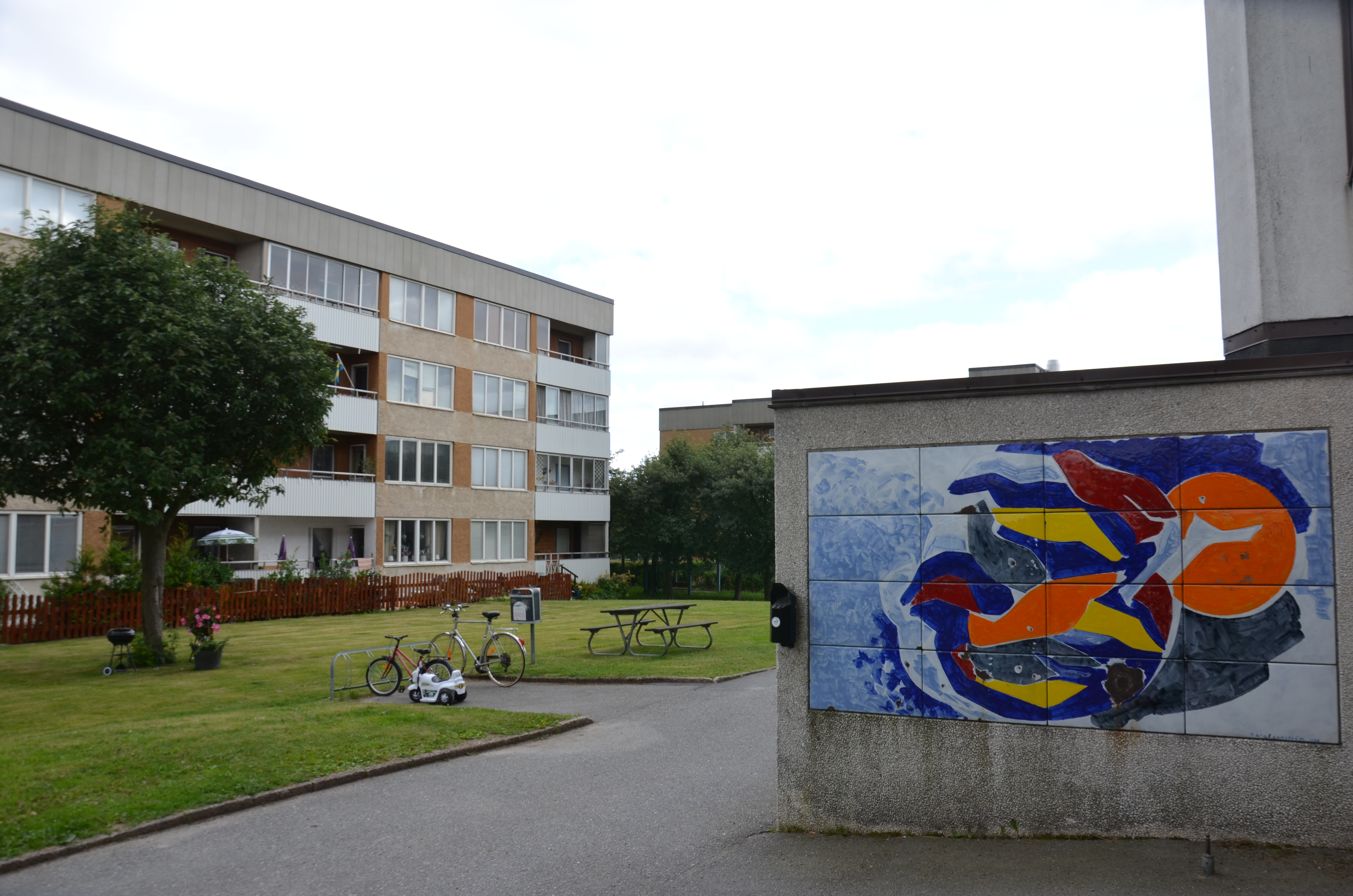
- Housing in the Östberga area in 2013

General information
- Location: Östbergahöjden, Stockholm Municipality
- Coordinates: 59.289168°N 18.036544°E
- System: Future Stockholm Metro station
- Owner: Region Stockholm
- Transit authority: SL
- Line: Yellow Line
- Platforms: 1 island platform
- Tracks: 2
- Connections: Bus

Construction
- Structure type: Underground
- Depth: 56 m (184 ft)

History
- Opening: 2034

Services
Preceding station	Stockholm Metro	Following station
Årstafältet towards Fridhemsplan	Yellow Line	Älvsjö Terminus
Location

Östbergahöjden is a future underground station on the Yellow Line of the Stockholm Metro, expected to open in 2034. It will be located in the southeastern part of the Östberga district in southern Stockholm Municipality, between the planned stations Årstafältet and Älvsjö.

== Location and design ==
The station will be built 56 metres underground and will be accessed by high-speed lifts connecting the ground level with a mezzanine floor below street level. Östbergahöjden will feature platform screen doors. Originally referred to as Östberga during planning, the name was officially changed to Östbergahöjden in 2024. The change was made by Region Stockholm to avoid confusion with the existing Östberga station to the north of Stockholm on the Roslagsbanan, and to better reflect the location of the station entrance in the area known as Östbergahöjden.

The station will be located at the eastern end of Östbergabackarna, connecting the existing Östberga centre with the newly developed Årstafältet neighborhood. The entrance will be situated in a corner of a planned mixed-use block with housing, approximately 100 metres from Östberga centrum. The new metro station is intended to both increase accessibility to the existing area, and support further residential and commercial development. Travel time will be approximately 8 minutes to Fridhemsplan and 2 minutes to Älvsjö without transfers.

== Construction ==
Construction of the station is part of the Yellow Line extension between Fridhemsplan and Älvsjö. Construction is expected to begin in late 2025, beginning with utility relocation. The Yellow Line is projected to be operational by 2034.
