= Stuvsta railway station =

Railway station in Huddinge, Sweden

Stuvsta
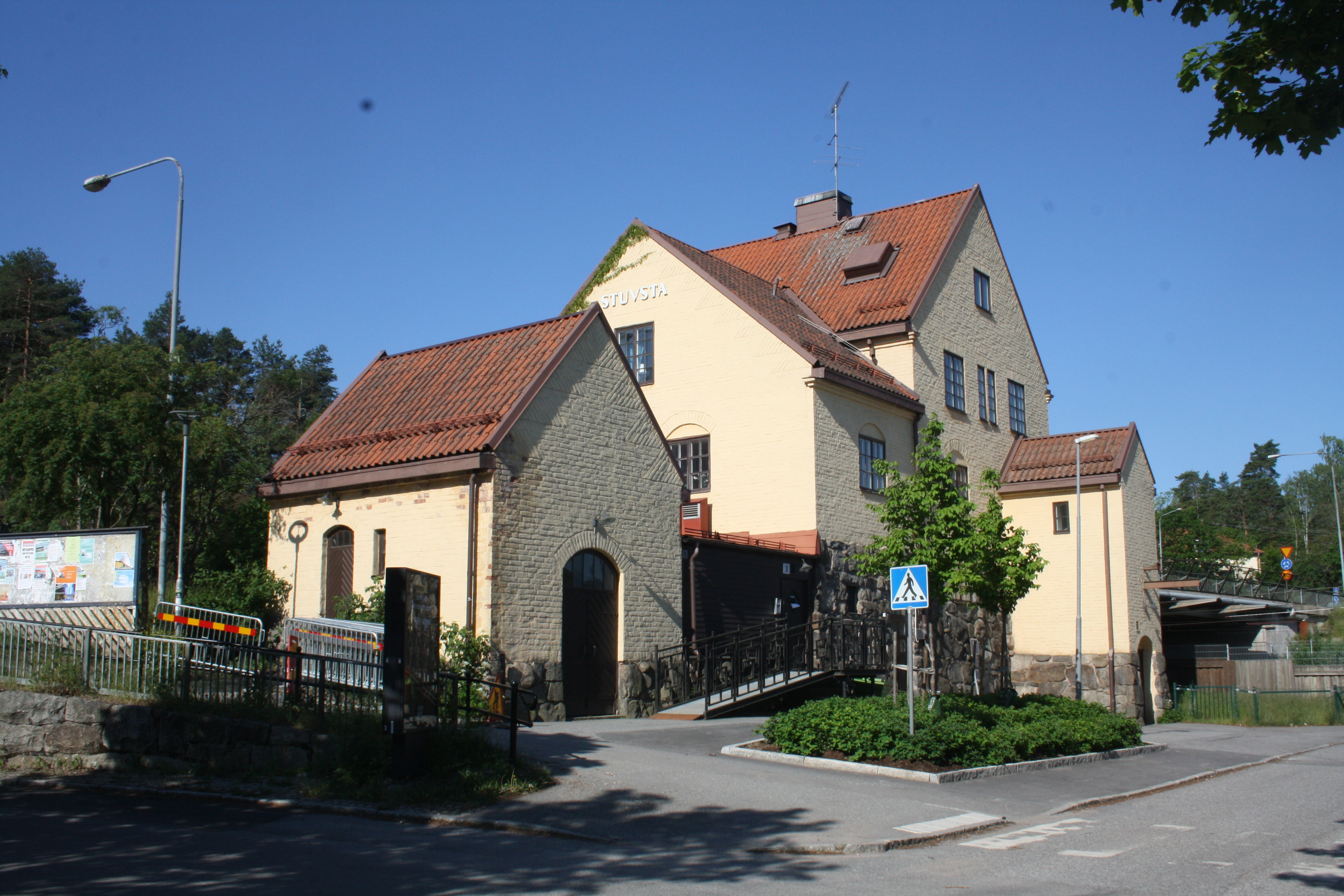
- Original station building

General information
- Location: Stockholm County
- Coordinates: 59°15′14″N 17°59′47″E
- System: Pendeltåg
- Owner: Swedish Transport Administration
- Platforms: Island Platform
- Tracks: 4
- Connections: Bus terminal

Construction
- Structure type: At-grade

Other information
- Station code: Sta

History
- Opened: 1918 (current station 1986)

Passengers
- 2015: 3,300 boarding per weekday (commuter rail)

Services
Preceding station	Stockholm commuter rail	Following station
Älvsjö towards Uppsala C	40	Huddinge towards Södertälje Centrum
Älvsjö towards Märsta	41	Huddinge towards Södertälje Centrum
Location

Stuvsta is a station on Stockholm's commuter rail network, located 11.5 km south of Stockholm Central Station in the Stuvsta-Snättringe district of Huddinge Municipality. The station consists of a single island platform with a ticket hall located on the platform and entrance through an underground pedestrian tunnel. The outer tracks are used for other train traffic. The current station was completed in 1986. As of 2015, the station had approximately 3,300 boardings per weekday.

== History ==
The station was originally opened in 1918 as a local stop along the Western Main Line after a residential area started developing. The "Stufstabolaget" local development company financed the station's construction and later transferred ownership to Swedish State Railways (SJ), a common practice for suburban stops in the Stockholm area. The first station building, designed by Folke Zetterwall and completed in 1917-1918, still exists today but serves other purposes such as community activities. A new station building was constructed in 1958 but was demolished in the 1980s when the railway was expanded to four tracks.

== Gallery ==
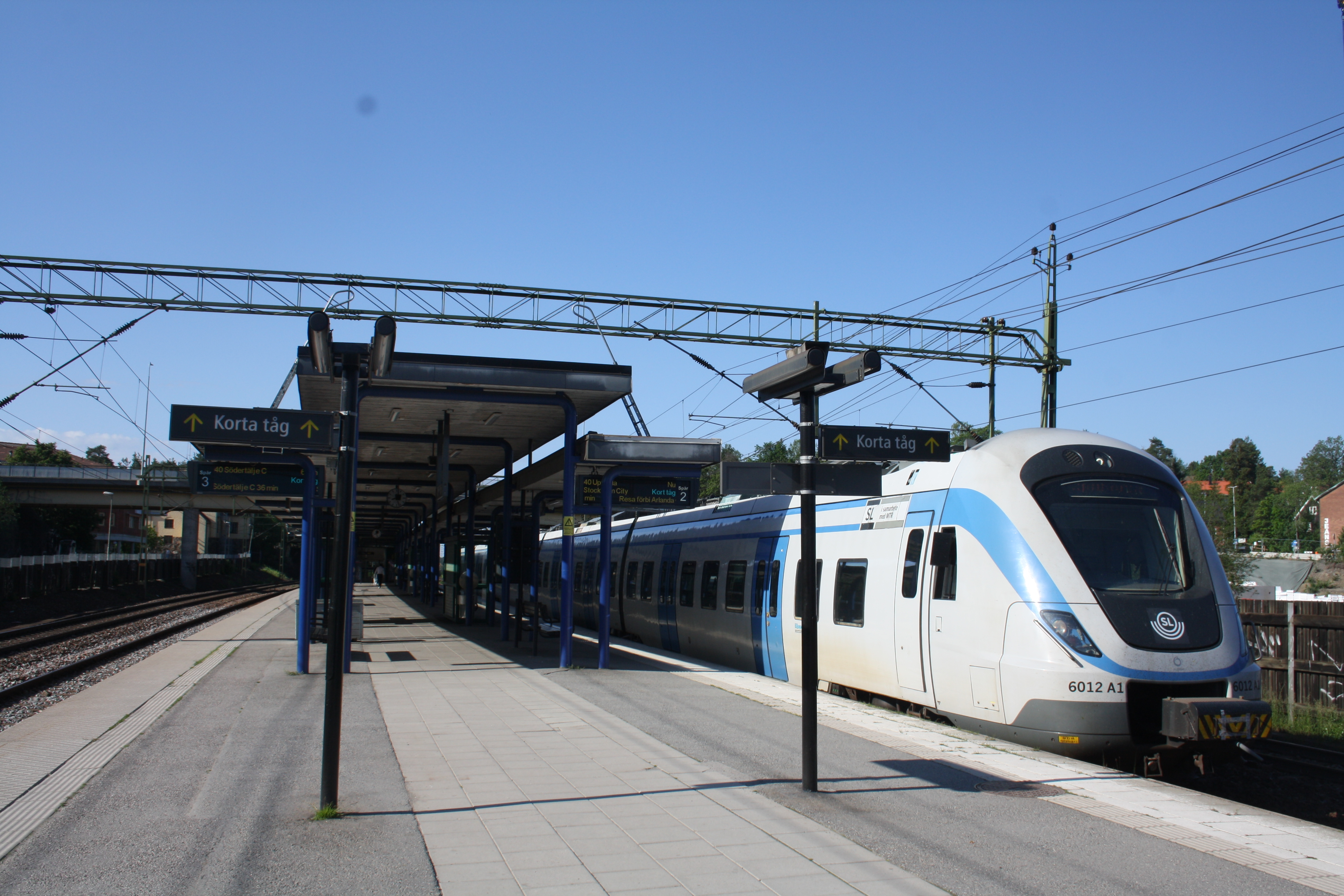
Stuvsta platform

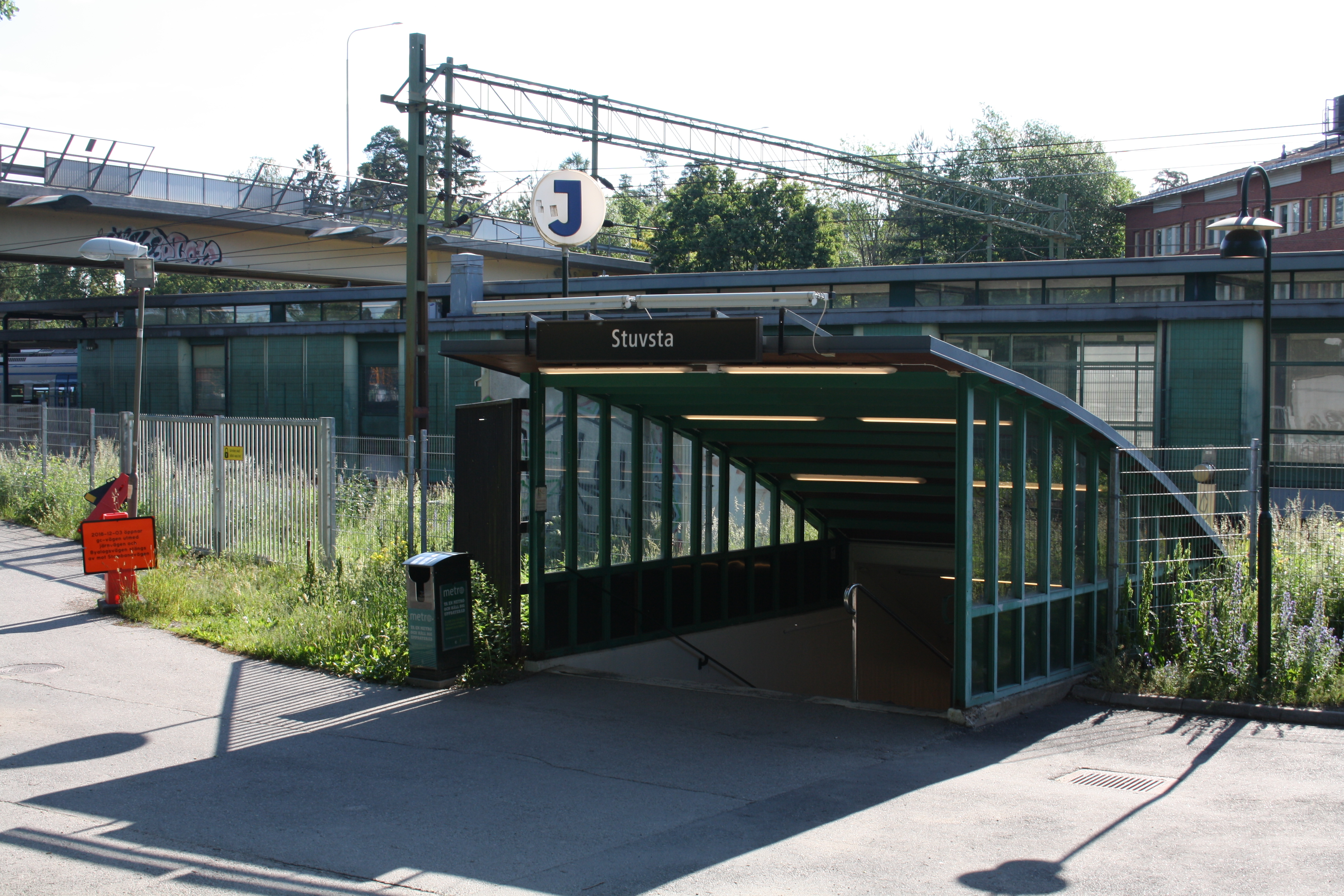
Entrance from the west

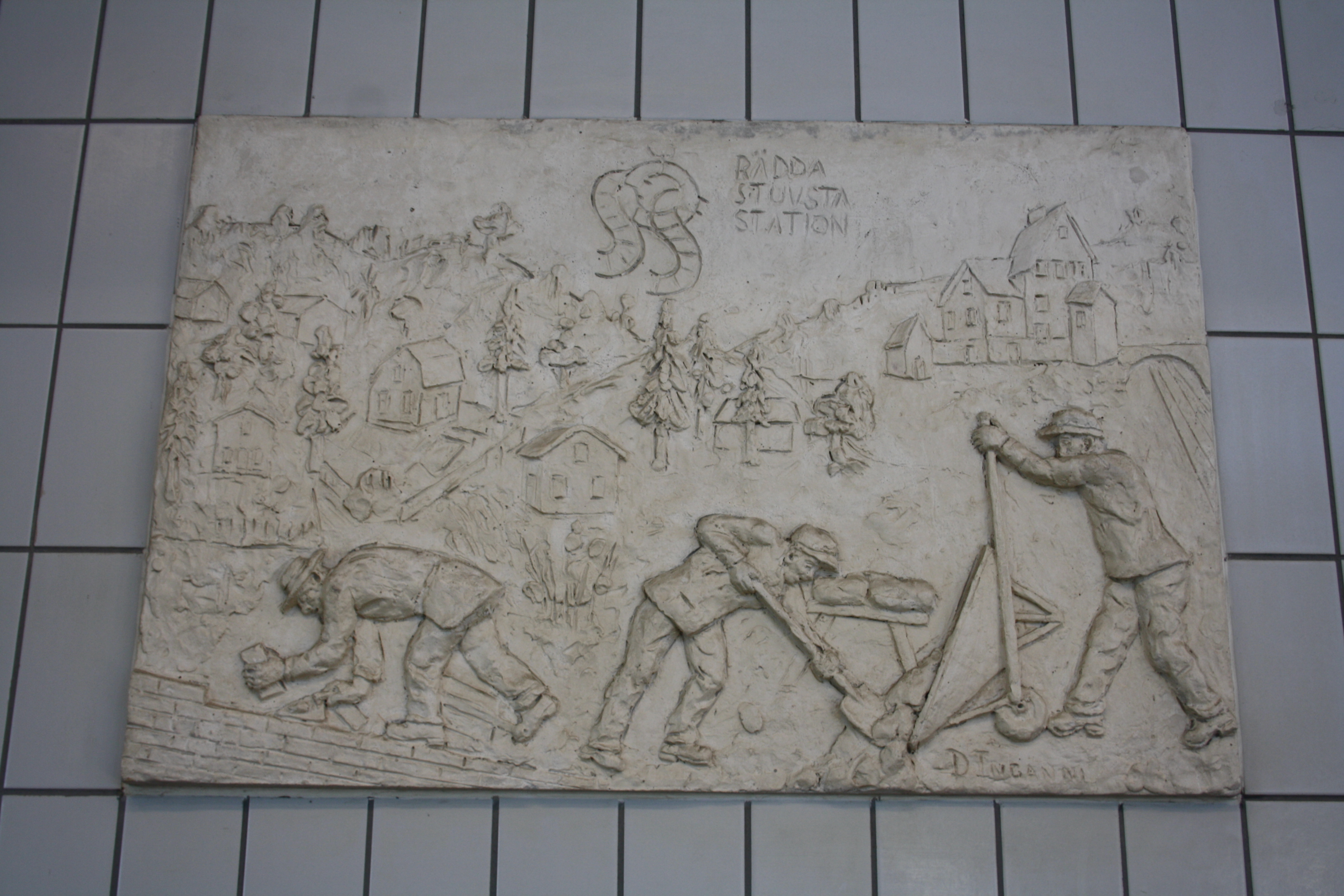
Artistic decoration

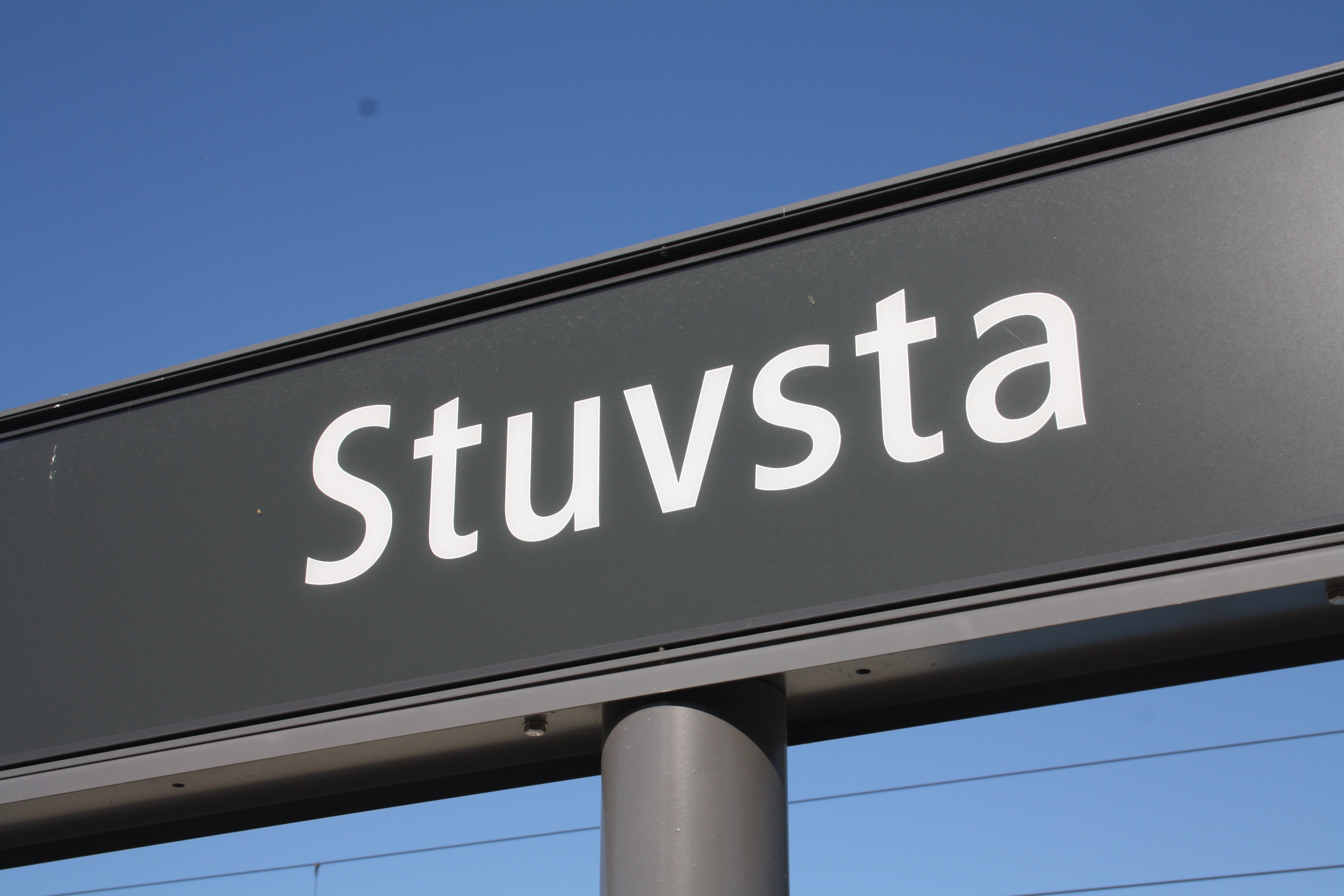
Station sign

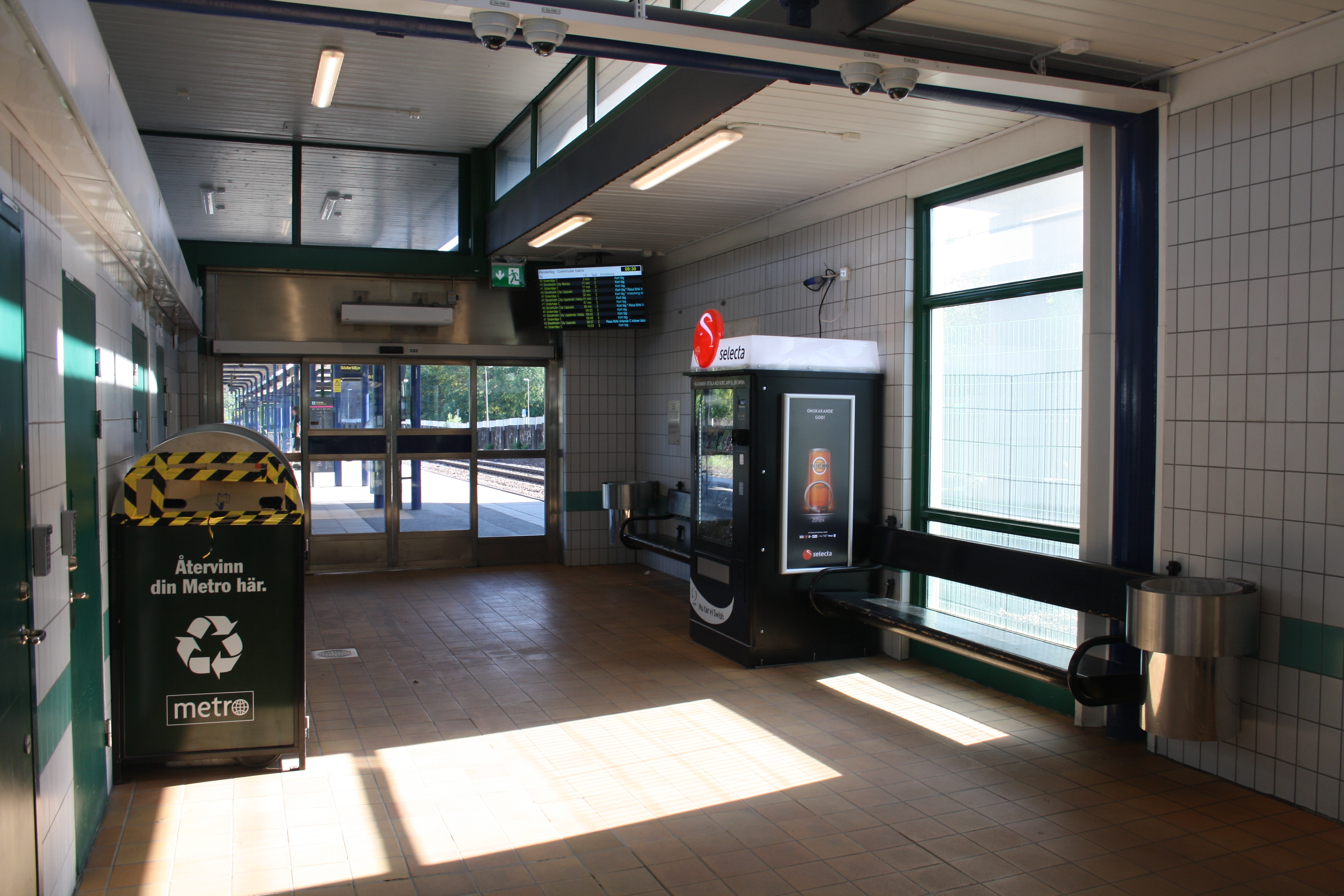
Waiting hall
