= Yellow Line (Stockholm Metro) =

Planned metro line in Stockholm, Sweden

Overview
- Native name: Gula linjen
- Locale: Stockholm, Sweden
- Termini: Fridhemsplan; Älvsjö
- Stations: 6
- Website: https://nyatunnelbanan.se/en/alvsjo/

Service
- Type: Rapid transit
- System: Storstockholms Lokaltrafik (SL)
- Depot: Älvsjö Industrial Area

History
- Work began: 2025
- Planned opening: 2034

Technical
- Line length: 8 km (5.0 mi)
- Character: Underground subway and at–grade-separated
Route map
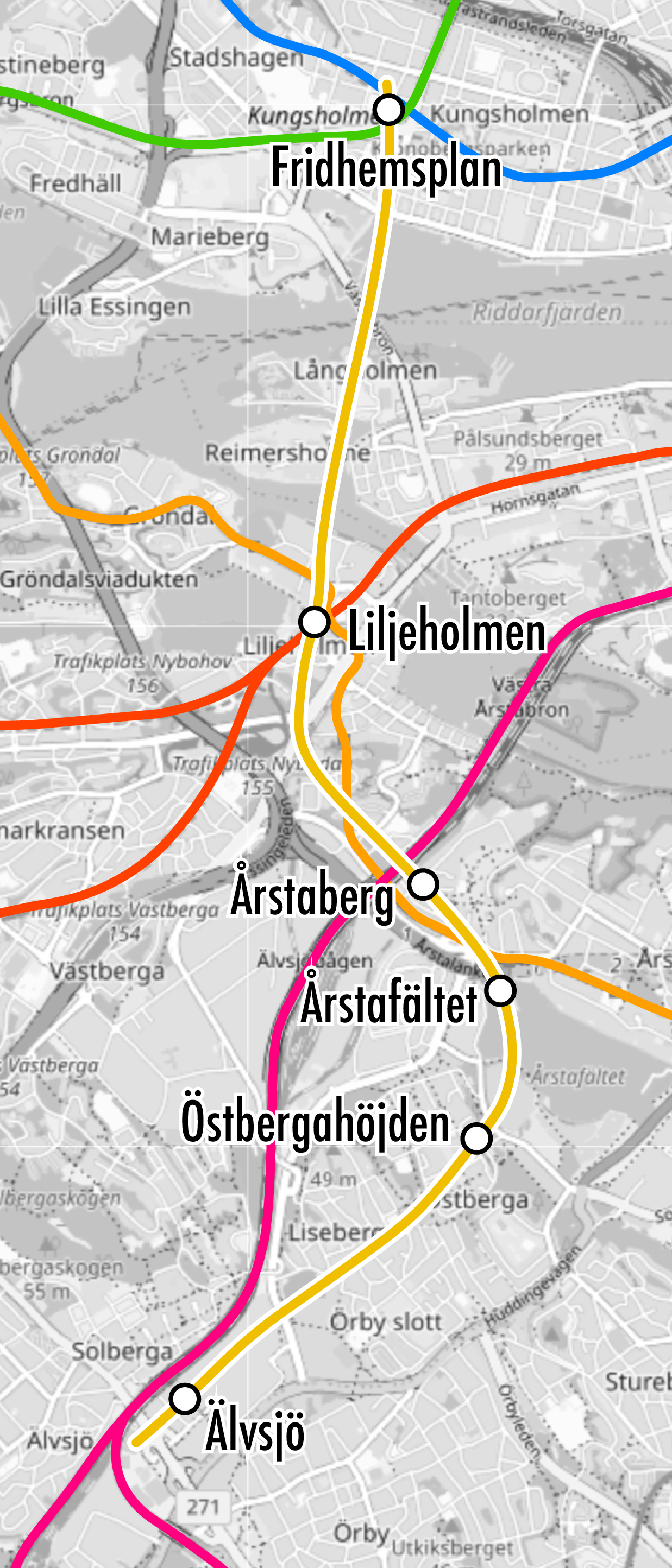

The Yellow Line (Swedish: Gula linjen) is a line under construction on the Stockholm Metro, that will connect Fridhemsplan in the west of central Stockholm to Älvsjö in the southern part of the city. The line is planned to open for service in 2034, and should serve approximately 75,000 passengers per day by 2050.

The Yellow Line will use a traffic control system with driverless operation, platform screen doors, and ballastless track, making it the first metro line in Stockholm to incorporate these features. The line will feature interchanges with all three of the Metro's existing lines, as well as to the Stockholm commuter rail and Tvärbanan light rail, however will be the Metro's first line without a station at T-Centralen.

Preparatory works for the line started in 2024, with construction commencing in late 2025. The Yellow Line is estimated to cost nearly 14 billion Swedish kronor, with the majority of the funding coming from the state. As a condition of this funding, the City of Stockholm is required to build 48,500 new homes.

== History ==
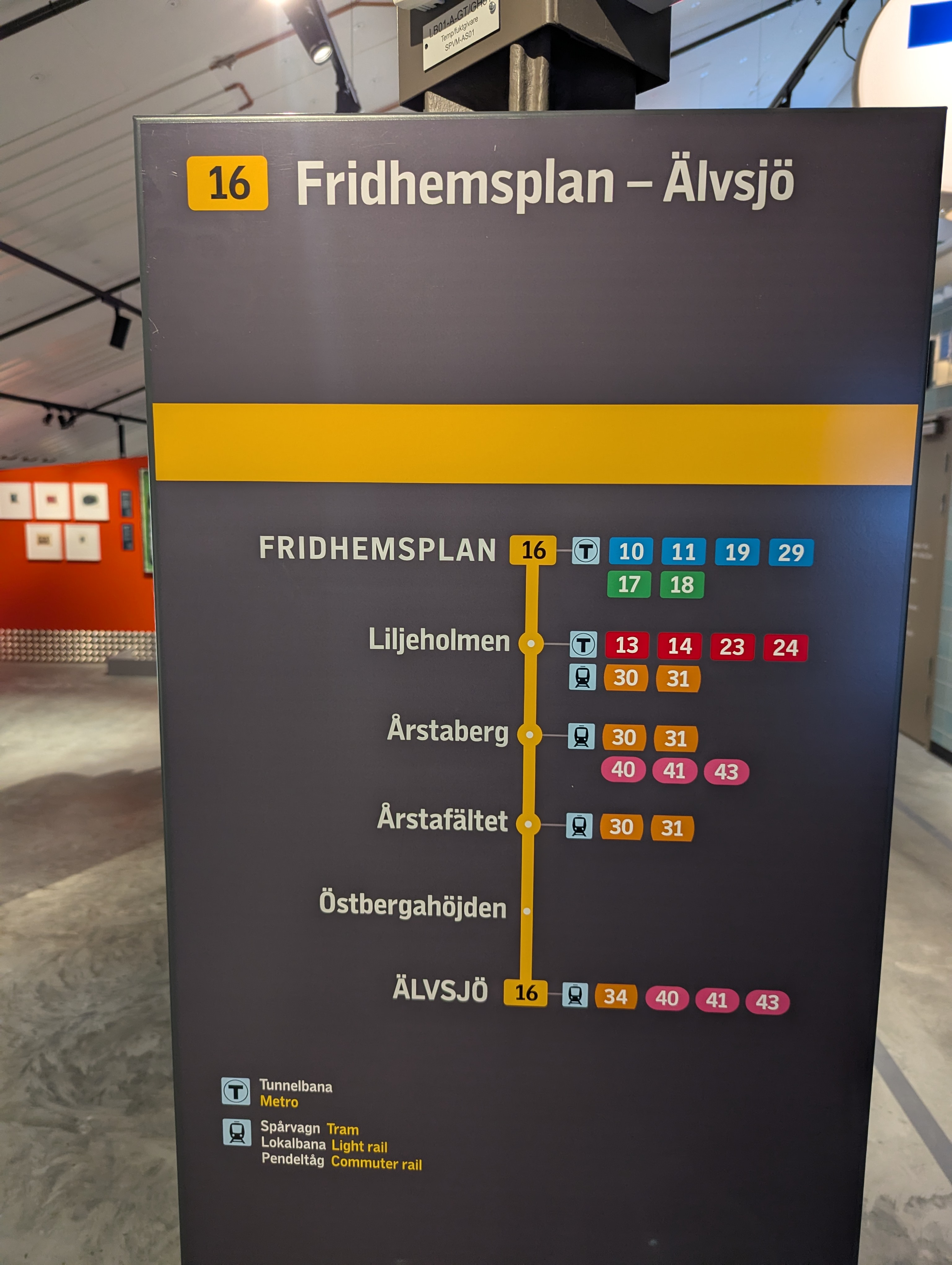
Mockup line diagram shown at the Stockholm Transport Museum

The initiative for a new line to the west of the city centre, avoiding Slussen, began with the Stockholm Negotiations (Swedish: Stockholmsförhandlingen) in 2013, which involved talks between the government, regions, and municipalities on improved public transport and urban development.

In spring 2017, an agreement was reached to build a new line connecting Fridhemsplan and Älvsjö, including a stop at Liljeholmen. Planning for the line began in 2020, including a study to assess potential routes and station locations. Public consultations were held to gather feedback from residents and local authorities. In 2021, the regional council approved a route with six station locations. In 2022, detailed planning and environmental assessments were conducted to outline construction methods and locations. Studies examined the impact on local land use and natural resources.

In May 2023, it was announced that the line would be called the "Yellow Line". Previously, yellow was used for the extension the Green Line from Odenplan to Arenastaden, due to open in 2028. This was rebranded instead as a new branch of the Green Line.

In 2024, preparatory work started, including modifications to existing infrastructure. A permit application for environmental clearance was submitted to the Environmental Court to assess impacts such as groundwater management and noise. In early 2025, plans were being submitted for the line's official approval, and construction was expected to start later in the year, pending all necessary permits.

In October 2025, construction of the Yellow Line began with a groundbreaking ceremony in Årsta, coinciding with the 75th anniversary of the Stockholm Metro. The construction phase is projected to last around nine years, with completion expected around 2034.

== Route ==
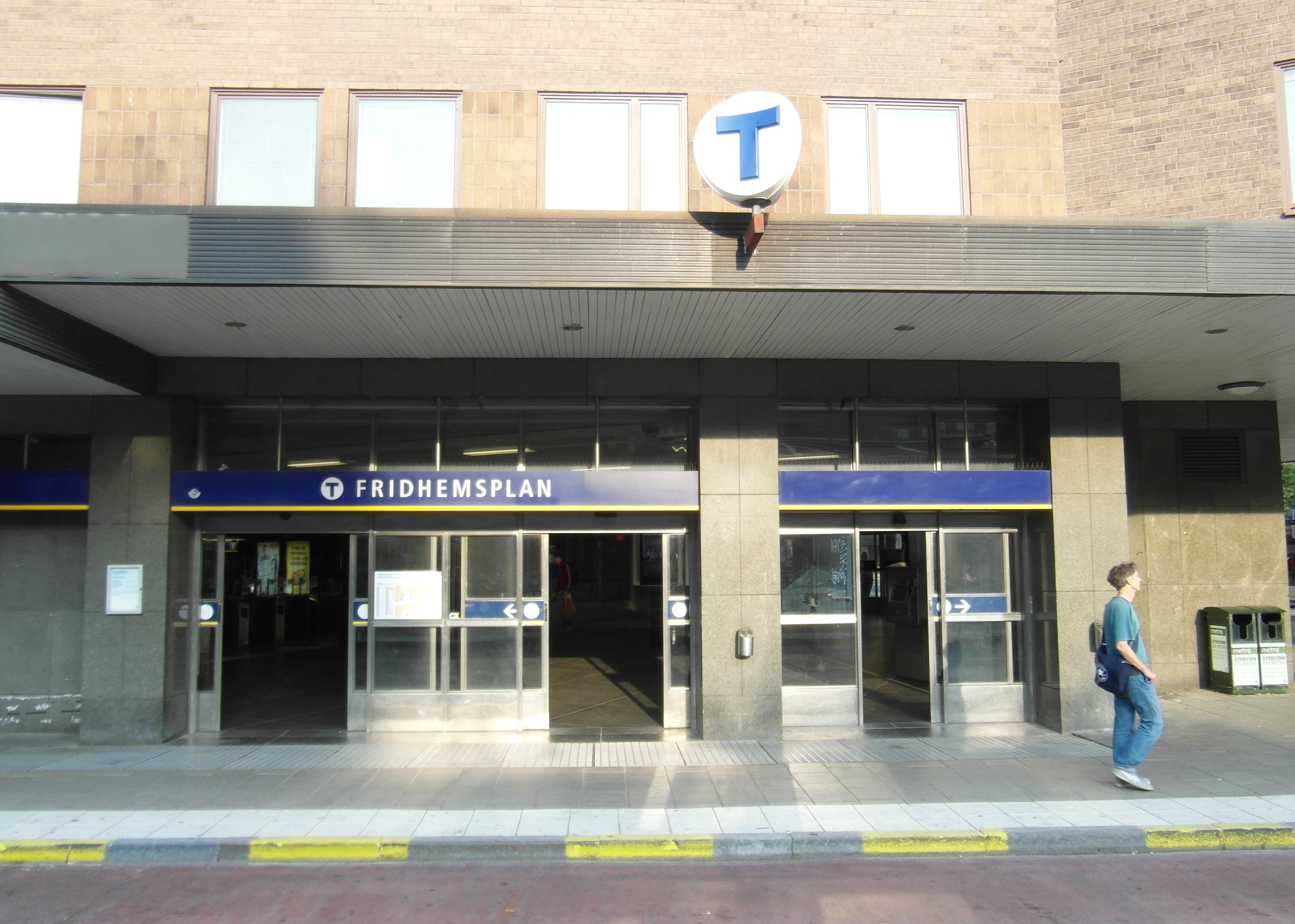
Fridhemsplan metro station, the planned northern terminus of the line

The Yellow Line will be approximately 8 km long, running north to south, to the west of the city centre. The line will include six stations :

- Fridhemsplan (Connecting to the Green Line and Blue Line)
- Liljeholmen (Connecting to the Red Line)
- Årstaberg (Connecting to the Stockholm commuter rail and Tvärbanan)
- Årstafältet
- Östbergahöjden
- Älvsjö (Connecting to the Stockholm commuter rail)

The line will run entirely underground, including a section beneath Lake Mälaren. Östbergahöjden was originally planned as "Östberga", but was renamed in April 2024 to avoid confusion with a station on the Roslagsbanan.

== Infrastructure ==
The Yellow Line will have several features distinctive from Stockholm's existing metro lines. Unlike the other lines, which feature physical connections, the Yellow Line will be separate from the rest of the metro network. This is due to differences in the line's technologies and a design, including shorter platforms and autonomous train operation.

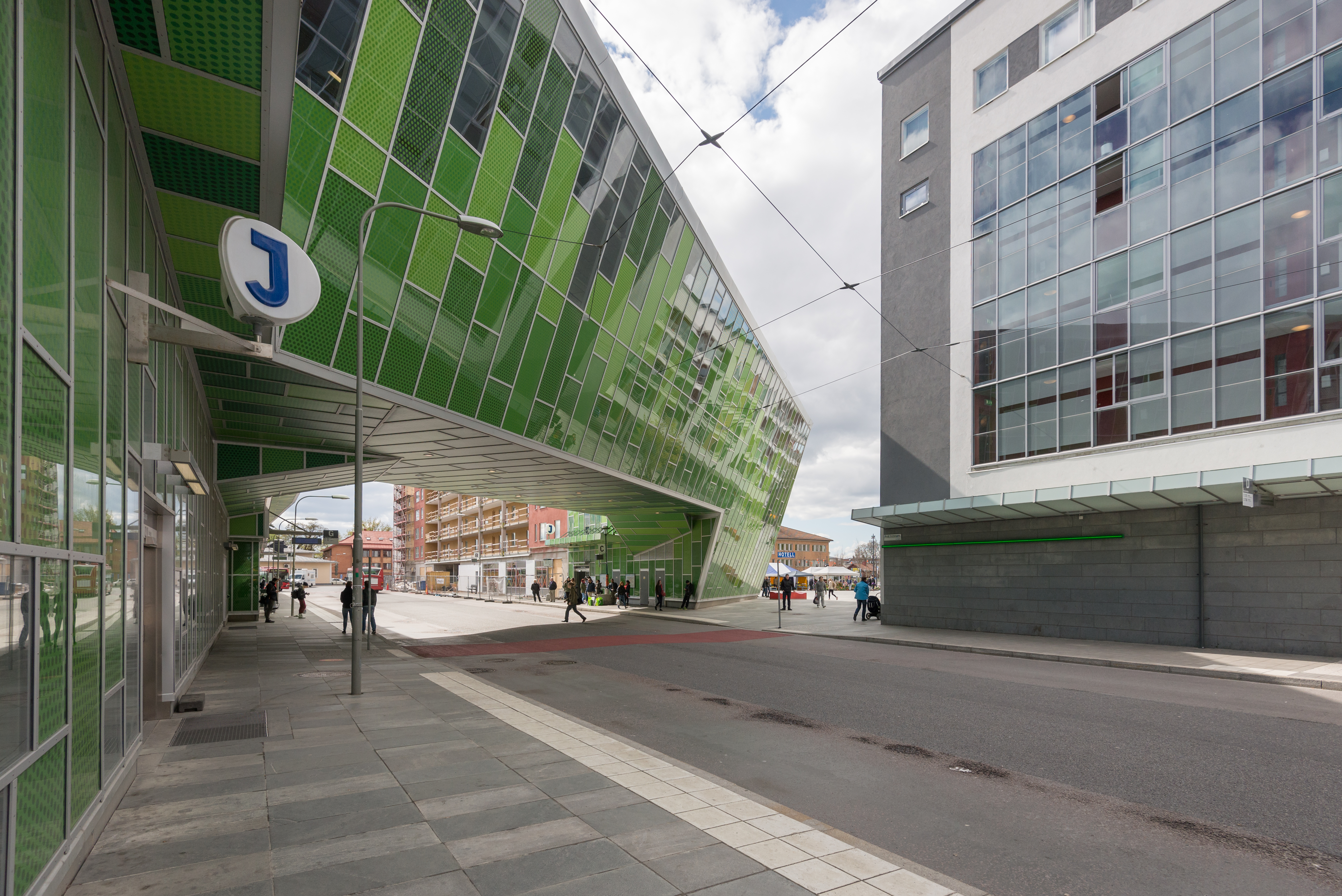
Älvsjö railway station, the planned southern terminus of the line

=== Stations ===
Platforms along the line will be built to accommodate 75-metre-long trains, much shorter than the 145-metre platforms on other lines in the Stockholm Metro. The intention is that capacity is instead created by more frequent departures and shorter total travel times.

The six new stations between Fridhemsplan and Älvsjö, will be equipped with lifts designed to transport passengers between the surface and platform levels in 20 to 30 seconds, as the stations will not have escalators. These stations will also feature narrower platform widths, and will have platform screen doors.

At Årstaberg, two entrances are planned: one towards Svärdlångsplan and one towards the commuter rail station. Östbergahöjden will have an entrance integrated into the ground floor of a new building near Östberga torg, and serve as a transfer point to bus services. Älvsjö metro station will be located adjacent to the existing commuter rail station, in a standalone building next to Stockholmsmässan. At Liljeholmen, the existing metro station be expanded including a new entrance near Trekantsparken containing lifts to the new platforms. At Fridhemsplan, the Yellow Line will be accessed via its existing entrances.

=== Tunnels ===
The line will be constructed with tunnels reaching a maximum depth of 80 metres below the surface, shallower than initially planned 100-metre depth proposed in earlier designs. Some stations, like Liljeholmen, have seen a significant change, with the station now being 38 metres higher than in earlier plans. This reduction in depth is aimed at lowering construction costs and shortening the project timeline.

=== Depot ===
The planned depot for the Yellow Line will be located in the Älvsjö industrial area, south of Älvsjö station. It is designed to accommodate approximately 10 trains, and will include maintenance and washing facilities. The depot will include both over-ground and under-ground sections. A connection between the depot and nearby Western Main Line, to facilitate the movement of trains and maintenance vehicles, is being investigated.

== Rolling stock ==
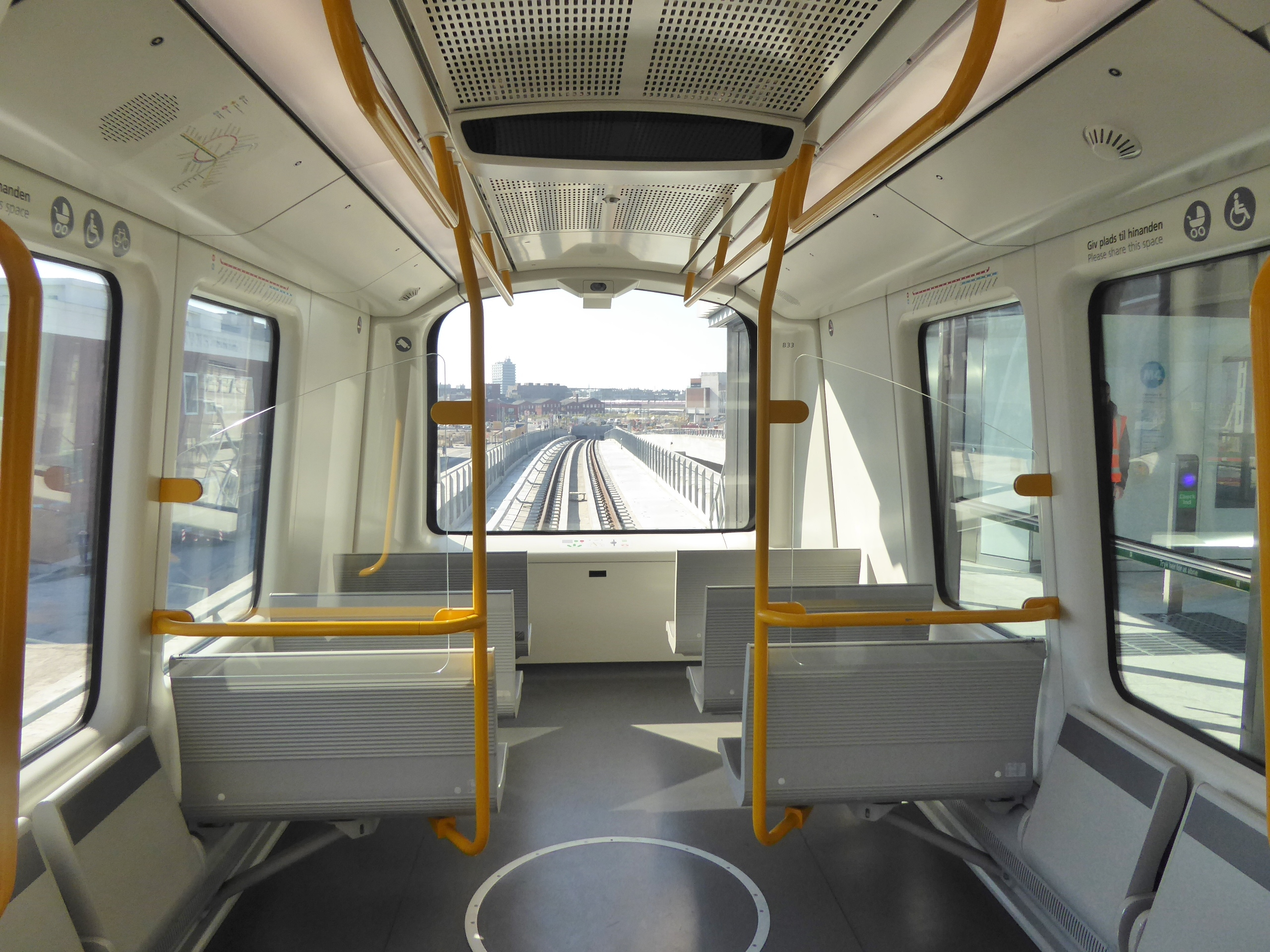
Autonomous train on the Copenhagen Metro

The line will feature unattended autonomous trains, making it the first line in Sweden to use driverless metro technology. The decision was made by Region Stockholm in September 2023. The trains will not have driver cabs, allowing for additional seating and views of the tunnel, similar to the system used in the Copenhagen Metro. Trains will be 70 metres in length, approximately half the length of trains used on other Stockholm Metro lines.

== Construction methods ==
Preparatory works for the line commenced in 2024, and construction of the Yellow Line is set to begin in 2025. The project will employ two tunnel boring machines (TBMs) to excavate bedrock for the two tunnels in parallel, a method that aims to reduce disruptions and speed up the construction process compared to the traditional drill-and-blast technique used in other Stockholm Metro expansions. Blasting will still be used for the creation of station spaces and vertical access shafts. In May 2024, plans for a controversial work tunnel originally planned near Rålambshovsparken were scrapped, and relocated to Lindhagensplan.

== Future extensions ==
Future expansions of the Yellow Line are under discussion, with two primary options for extending service beyond Fridhemsplan. One proposal would see the line continue to the north-east, passing through Odenplan, KTH, Gärdet, and Frihamnen. The alternative would extend the line westward towards Bromma, supporting the planned transformation of Bromma Airport into a new residential area. These extensions remain in the early planning stages and would only proceed after the initial route is completed.

== See also ==
- Green Line (Stockholm Metro)
- Red Line (Stockholm Metro)
- Blue Line (Stockholm Metro)
