= Farsta strand railway station =

Swedish railway station

Farsta strand
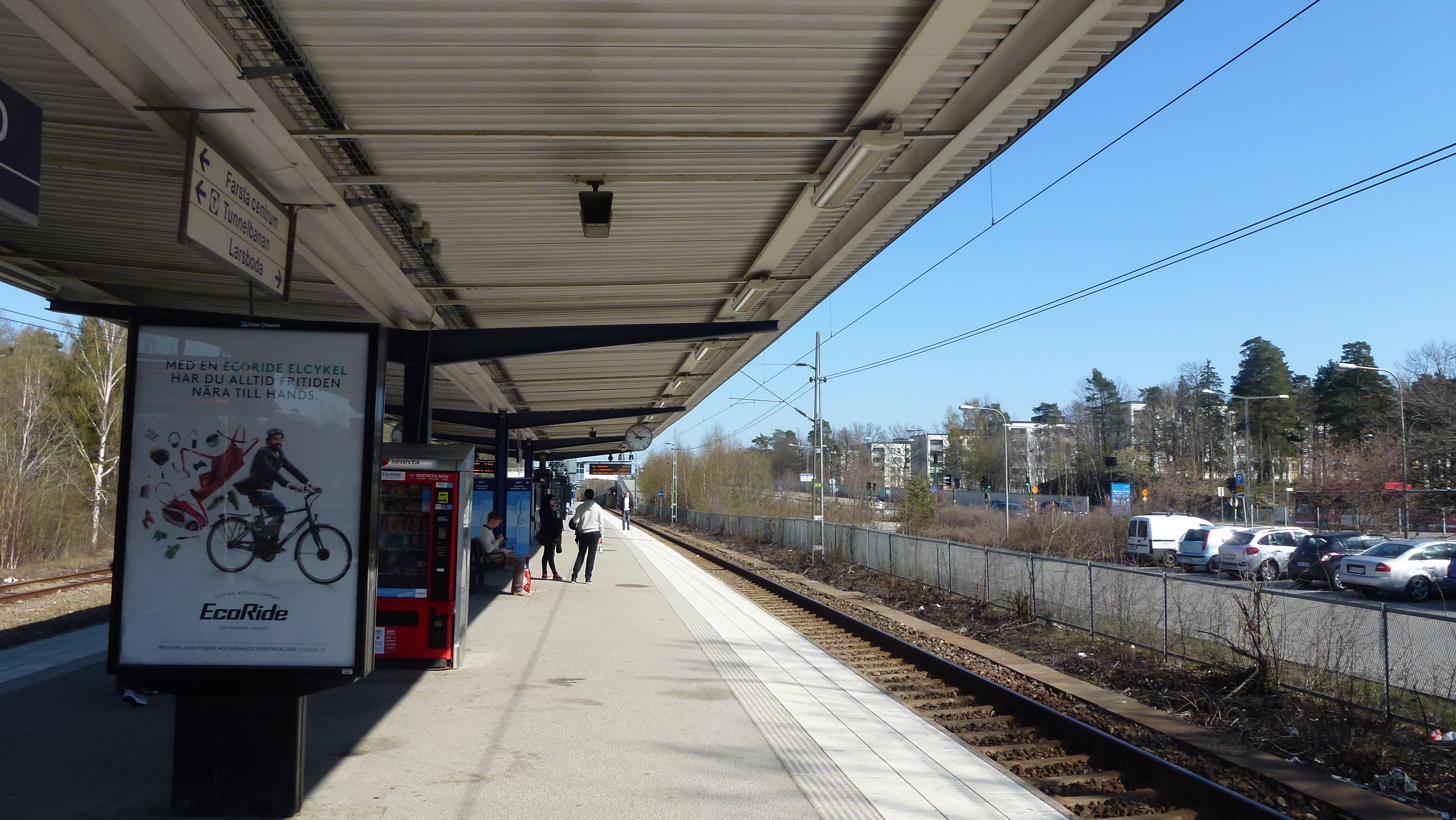

General information
- Location: Farsta strand, Stockholm Municipality; Sweden
- Coordinates: 59°14′6″N 18°06′7″E
- Line: Nynäs Line
- Platforms: 1 island platform
- Connections: Metro: at Farsta strand metro station Bus: 181, 184, 742, 833

Construction
- Structure type: At grade
- Accessible: Yes

Other information
- Station code: Fas

Passengers
- 2019: 5,100 boarding per weekday

Services
Preceding station	Stockholm commuter rail	Following station
Älvsjö towards Märsta	42X	Handen towards Nynäshamn
Älvsjö towards Kallhäll	43X	Handen towards Nynäshamn
Älvsjö towards Bålsta	43	Trångsund towards Nynäshamn
Location

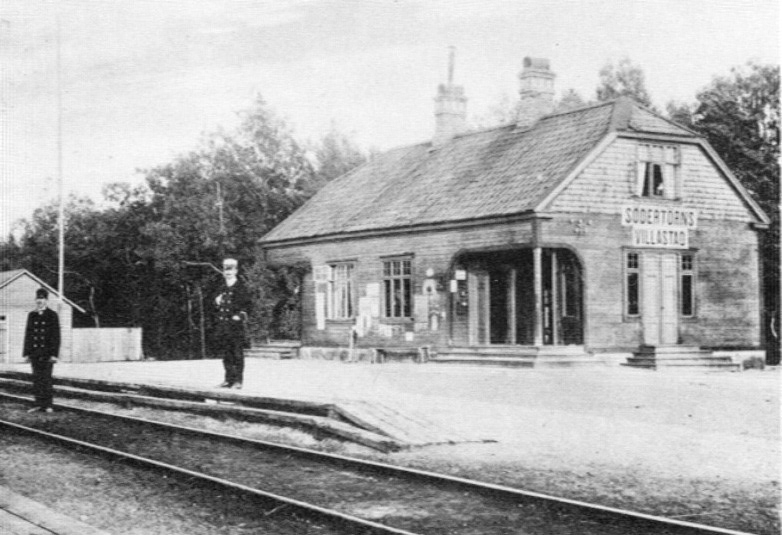
"Södertörns villastad" station in 1901

Farsta strand is a railway station on the Stockholm commuter rail's Nynäshamn line. It is connected to the Farsta strand metro station, the southern terminus for Line 18. The station was originally named "Södertörns villastad". It was renamed "Farsta strand" in 1989.
