= Årstaberg railway station =

Railway station in Stockholm, Sweden

Årstaberg
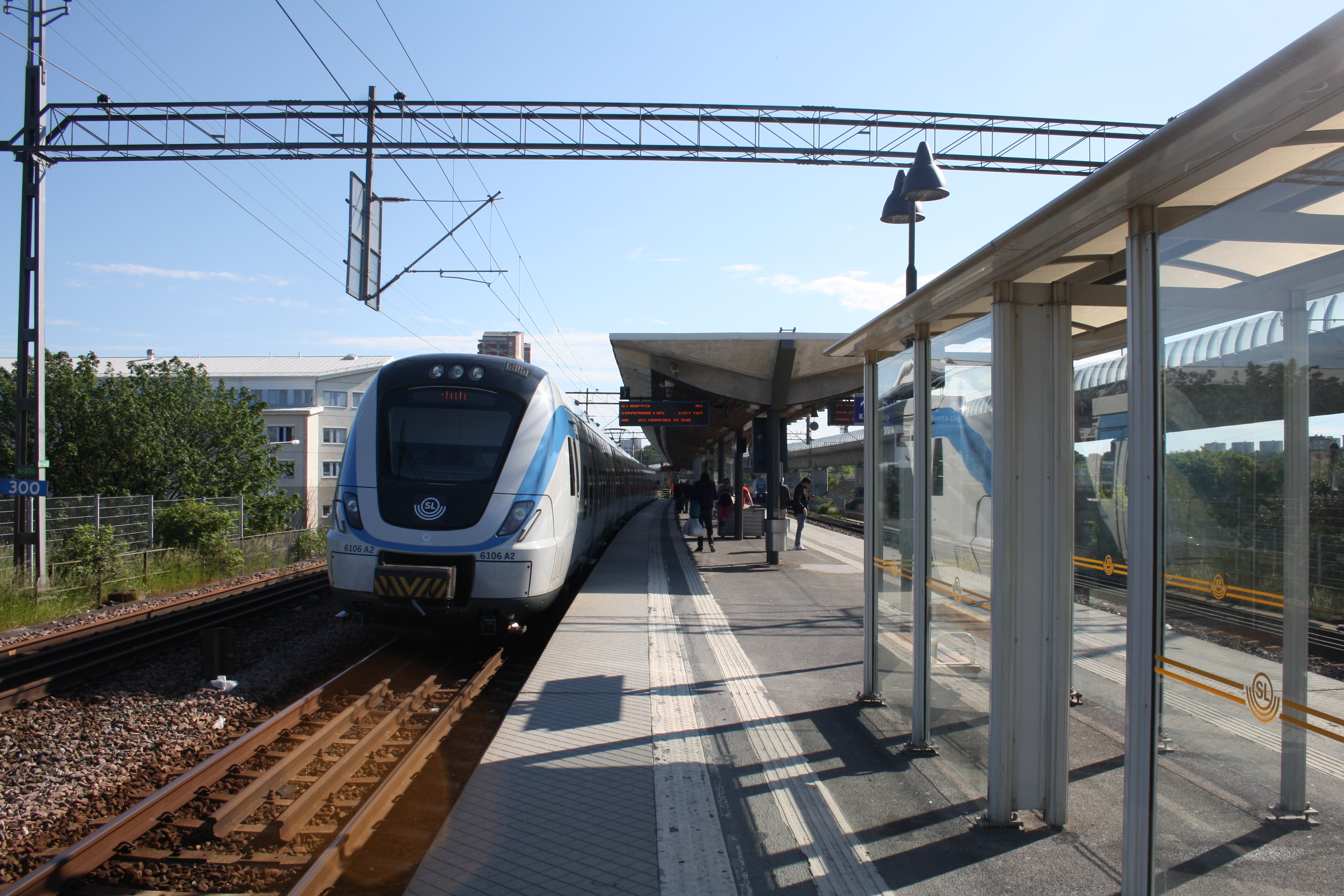

General information
- Location: Stockholm County
- Coordinates: 59.2998°N 18.0285°E
- System: Pendeltåg
- Owner: Swedish Transport Administration
- Platforms: Island Platform
- Tracks: 2

Construction
- Structure type: Elevated

History
- Opened: 2006

Passengers
- 2022: 12,200 boarding per weekday (commuter rail)

Services
Preceding station	Stockholm commuter rail	Following station
Stockholms södra towards Uppsala C	40	Älvsjö towards Södertälje centrum
Stockholms södra towards Märsta	41	Älvsjö towards Södertälje centrum
Stockholms södra towards Märsta	42X	Älvsjö towards Nynäshamn
Stockholms södra towards Bålsta	43	Älvsjö towards Nynäshamn
Stockholms södra towards Kallhäll	43X	Älvsjö towards Nynäshamn
Stockholms södra towards Bro	44	Älvsjö towards Tumba

Other services
Preceding station	SL Local & Light Rail	Following station
Årstadal towards Solna station	Tvärbanan Line 30	Årstafältet towards Sickla

Future Services
Preceding station	Stockholm Metro	Following station
Liljeholmen towards Fridhemsplan	Yellow Line	Årstafältet towards Älvsjö
Location

Årstaberg is a station on Stockholm's commuter rail network, situated on the border between the Liljeholmen and Årsta districts in the south of Stockholm Municipality. The station has a central platform with two tracks serving commuter trains, along with additional tracks for passing trains that do not stop at the station. Årstaberg Station also features a stop on the Tvärbanan light rail line.

== History ==
When the Årsta Bridge opened in 1929, the Western Main Line from Stockholm Central Station was rerouted through Årstaberg. At that time, Årstaberg was a sparsely populated area, and no station was established.

The idea of creating a transit interchange on the existing railway at Årstaberg emerged much later during the planning of the Tvärbanan light rail line, which was to pass through the area. When the Tvärbanan began service through Årstaberg in 2000, planners recognised the potential for a commuter train station to connect the two systems.

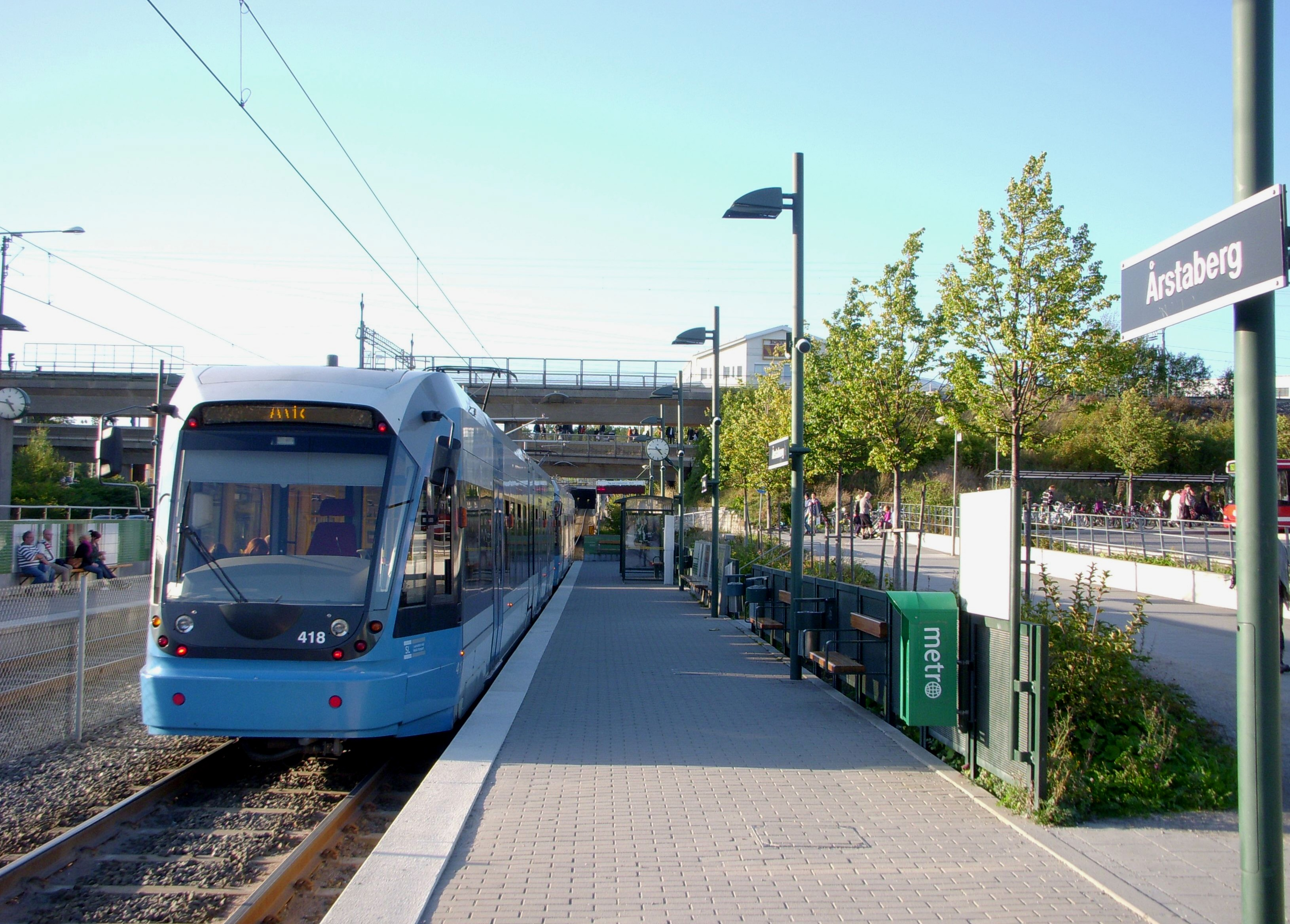
Tvärbanan Light Rail stop at Årstaberg

Initial plans for Årstaberg station included two platforms, one for each direction. However, the design was later revised to a single shared platform, built between the existing tracks on parallel viaducts. Space constraints resulted in a relatively narrow platform, despite the high volume of passengers.

Årstaberg station officially opened on January 9, 2006. In addition to commuter train and Tvärbanan services, a bus interchange serving local SL routes was built next to the station.

The station infrastructure underwent another major change with the opening of the Stockholm City Line on July 10, 2017. Northbound long-distance trains were rerouted onto a new viaduct, known as the Älvsjöbågen, which crosses over the commuter rail tracks south of Årstaberg and connects to the original eastern Årsta Bridge. Meanwhile, the newer western Årsta Bridge is now used exclusively by commuter trains.

Since the opening of the station, the surrounding Årstaberg area has undergone considerable urban development, transitioning from an industrial zone to a mixed-use residential area. Alongside a new primary school, and new offices and retail units, approximately 1,000 new housing units are being built in the area, with 400 units under construction as of 2024.

== Future plans ==
=== Metro station ===
The Yellow Line will include a station at Årstaberg railway station. The line is planned to open in 2034 and will run approximately 8 kilometres north, from Älvsjö railway station to Fridhemsplan via Liljeholmen.

=== Station expansion studies ===
A 2021 report by the Swedish Transport Administration concluded that the existing platform and station building at Årstaberg were under-dimensioned for current passenger flows, leading to congestion during peak hours. The report outlined proposed upgrades, including the construction of a new railway bridge west of the existing tracks, a dedicated platform for northbound trains, a widening of the existing platform, and better links to the bus and tram stations.

== See also ==
- Stockholm Commuter Rail
