= Älvsjö railway station =

Railway station in Stockholm, Sweden

Älvsjö
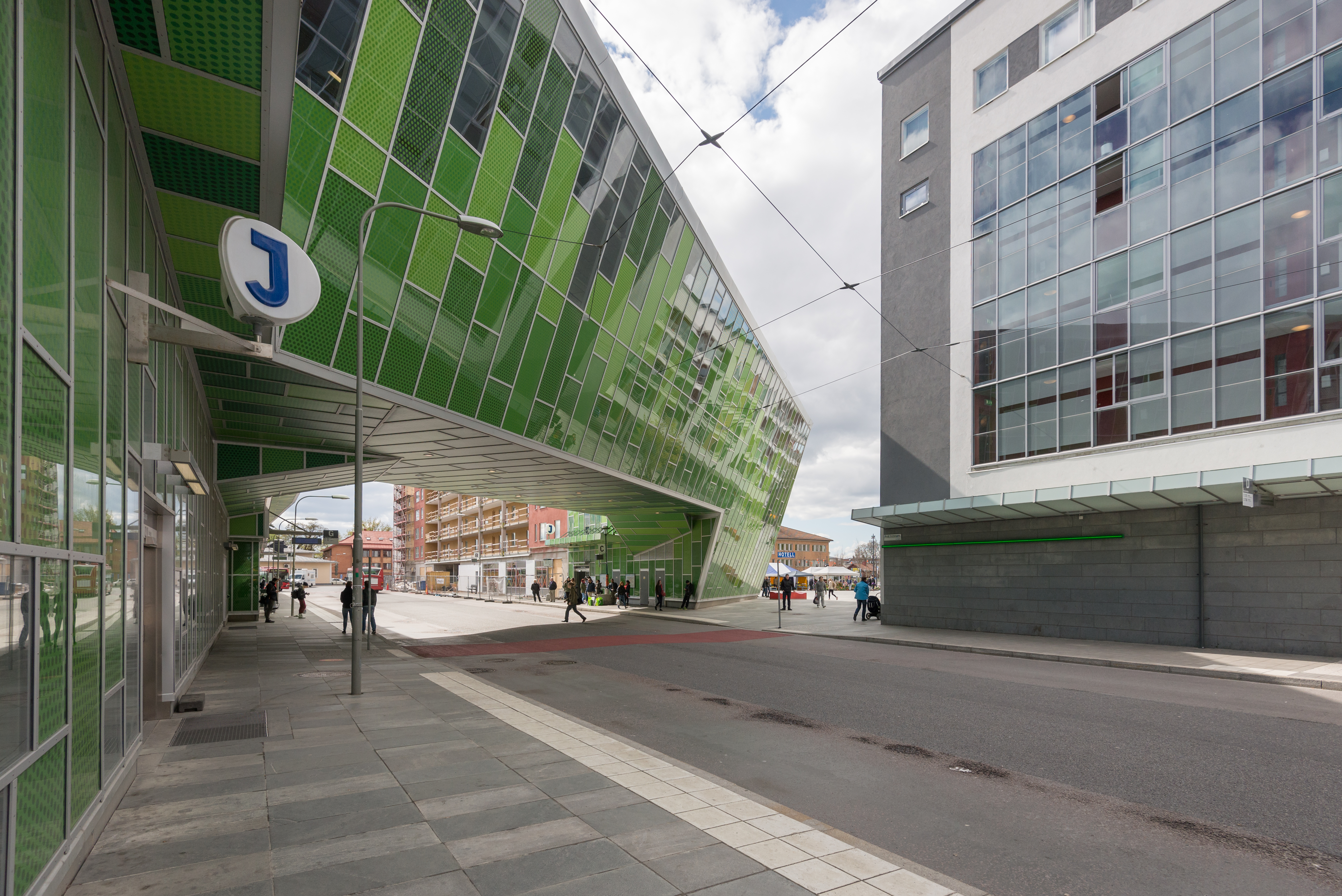

General information
- Location: Stockholm County
- Coordinates: 59.2786°N 18.0111°E
- System: Pendeltåg
- Owner: Swedish Transport Administration
- Platforms: 2 Island Platforms
- Tracks: 7 (4 Platform Tracks)

Construction
- Structure type: at-grade

History
- Opened: 1879
- Rebuilt: 2011 (Station Building)
- Former names: Elfsjö

Passengers
- 2022: 16,700 boarding per weekday (commuter rail)

Services
Preceding station	Stockholm commuter rail	Following station
Årstaberg towards Uppsala C	40	Stuvsta towards Södertälje centrum
Årstaberg towards Märsta	41	Stuvsta towards Södertälje centrum
Årstaberg towards Märsta	42X	Farsta strand towards Nynäshamn
Årstaberg towards Bålsta	43	Farsta strand towards Nynäshamn
Årstaberg towards Kallhäll	43X	Farsta strand towards Nynäshamn
Årstaberg towards Bro	44	Farsta strand towards Tumba

Future Services
Preceding station	Stockholm Metro	Following station
Östbergahöjden towards Fridhemsplan	Yellow Line	Terminus
Location

Älvsjö is a station on the Stockholm commuter rail network, located in the districts of Solberga and Älvsjö in the south of Stockholm Municipality. It is adjacent to the Stockholmsmässan exhibition centre.

== History ==
Älvsjö station, originally spelled "Elfsjö," first opened on 1 November 1879 along the Western Main Line, which connected Stockholm to Södertälje in 1860 and to Gothenburg in 1862. Before the station was built, a provisional stop had been established at the request of Count Gustaf Lagerbjelke, the owner of nearby Älvsjö Gård manor.

On 28 December 1901, the Nynäs Line was inaugurated, turning Älvsjö into a junction station. The name was officially changed from "Elfsjö" to "Älvsjö" in 1909. Between 1916 and 1917, the station underwent expansion, adding separate tracks for local and long-distance trains, along with a footbridge.

In 1932, a new station building was constructed, and the footbridge was replaced by a pedestrian tunnel. Major changes in operation came on 1 January 1967 when Storstockholms Lokaltrafik (SL) took over responsibility for local rail traffic in Stockholm County, establishing the Stockholm commuter rail network. This was followed by further development of the station, alongside the construction of the nearby exhibition centre.

== Facilities ==
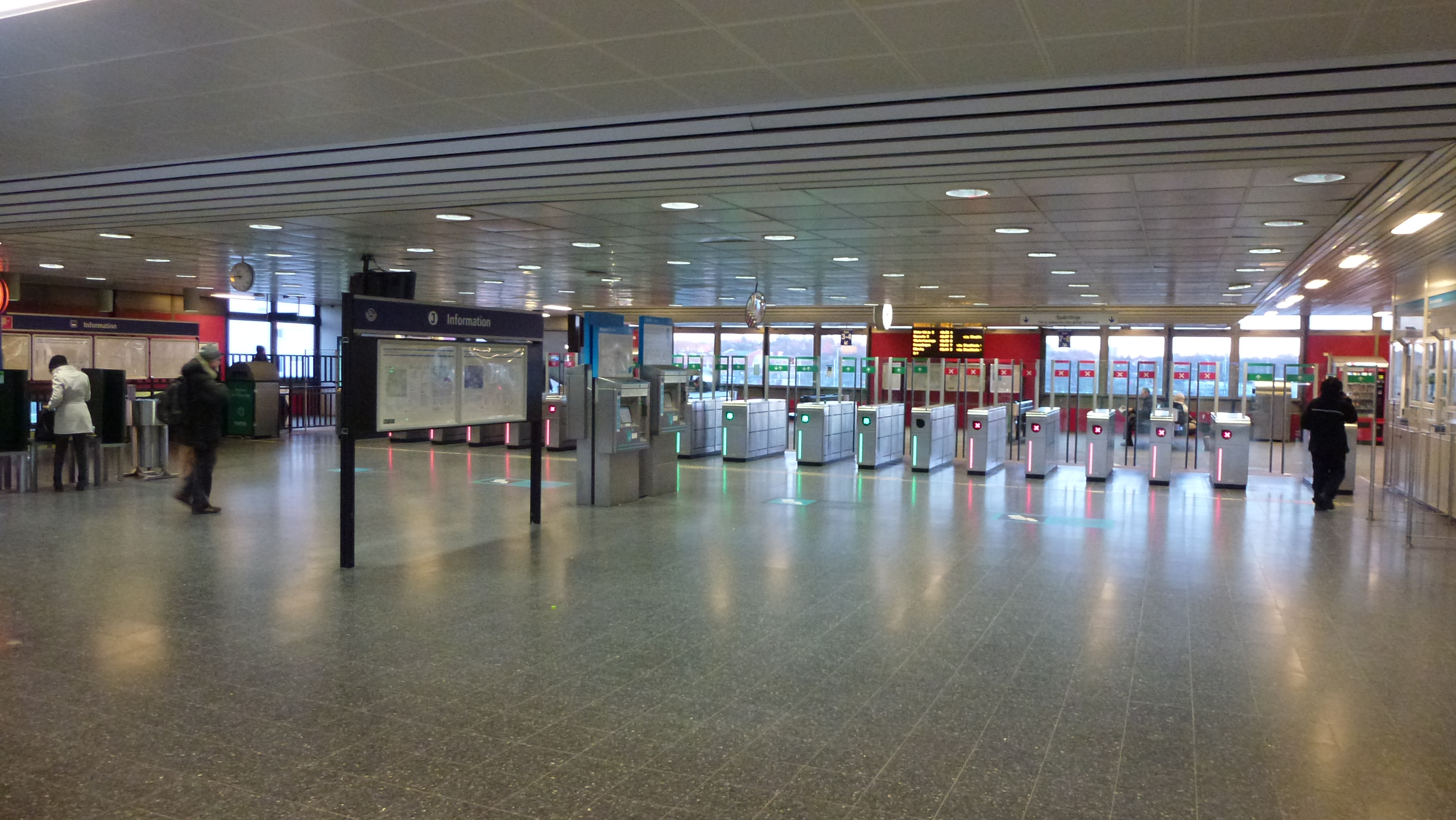
Ticket Hall

Today, Älvsjö serves as a junction station for both the Nynäs Line and the Western Main Line, located between Årstaberg to the north, and Stuvsta and Farsta strand stations to the South and South-East. It features two platforms, one for each line, with additional through tracks for long-distance and freight trains.

The station includes a ticket hall situated above the tracks, with access to both central Älvsjö and Stockholmsmässan via a pedestrian viaduct. The ticket office has a main sales counter and two additional counters that open during large events at Stockholmsmässan. The station is equipped with numerous combined entry and exit gates. In 2022, it saw approximately 16,700 boardings on a typical winter weekday.

A renovation of the bus station and adjacent square began in February 2011, with the work completed in autumn 2014.

== Freight ==
Approximately 1 kilometre north of the commuter rail station is the Älvsjö Freight Yard, which has been in operation since 1972. This facility handles the loading and unloading of goods transported to and from Stockholm and locations further south.

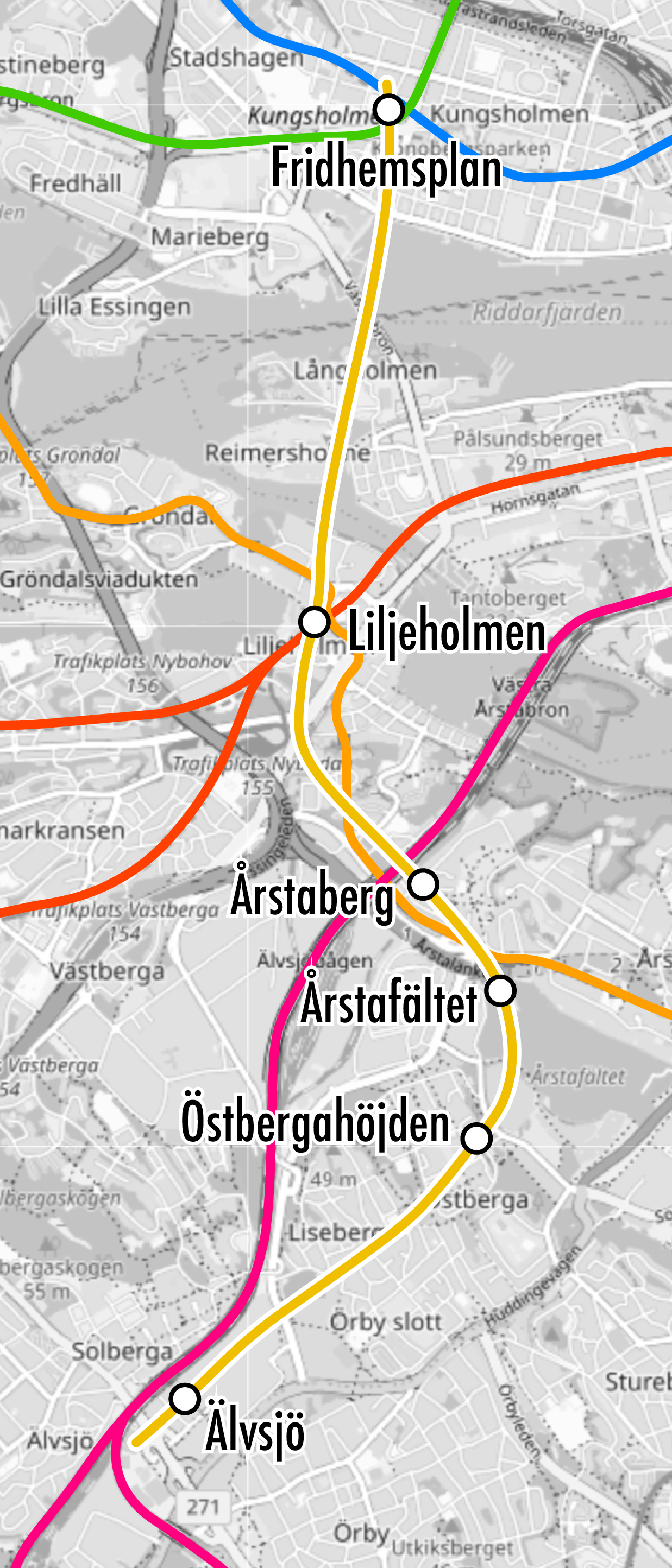
Route of the planned Yellow Line from Älvsjö

== Future Metro station ==
The southern terminus of the planned Yellow Line will be at Älvsjö station. The line is planned to open in 2034 and will run approximately 8 kilometres north from Älvsjö to Fridhemsplan via Liljeholmen. The depot for the line will be situated in the Älvsjö industrial area.

== See also ==
- Stockholm Commuter Rail
