= Hagastaden metro station =

Future station on the Stockholm Metro

Hagastaden
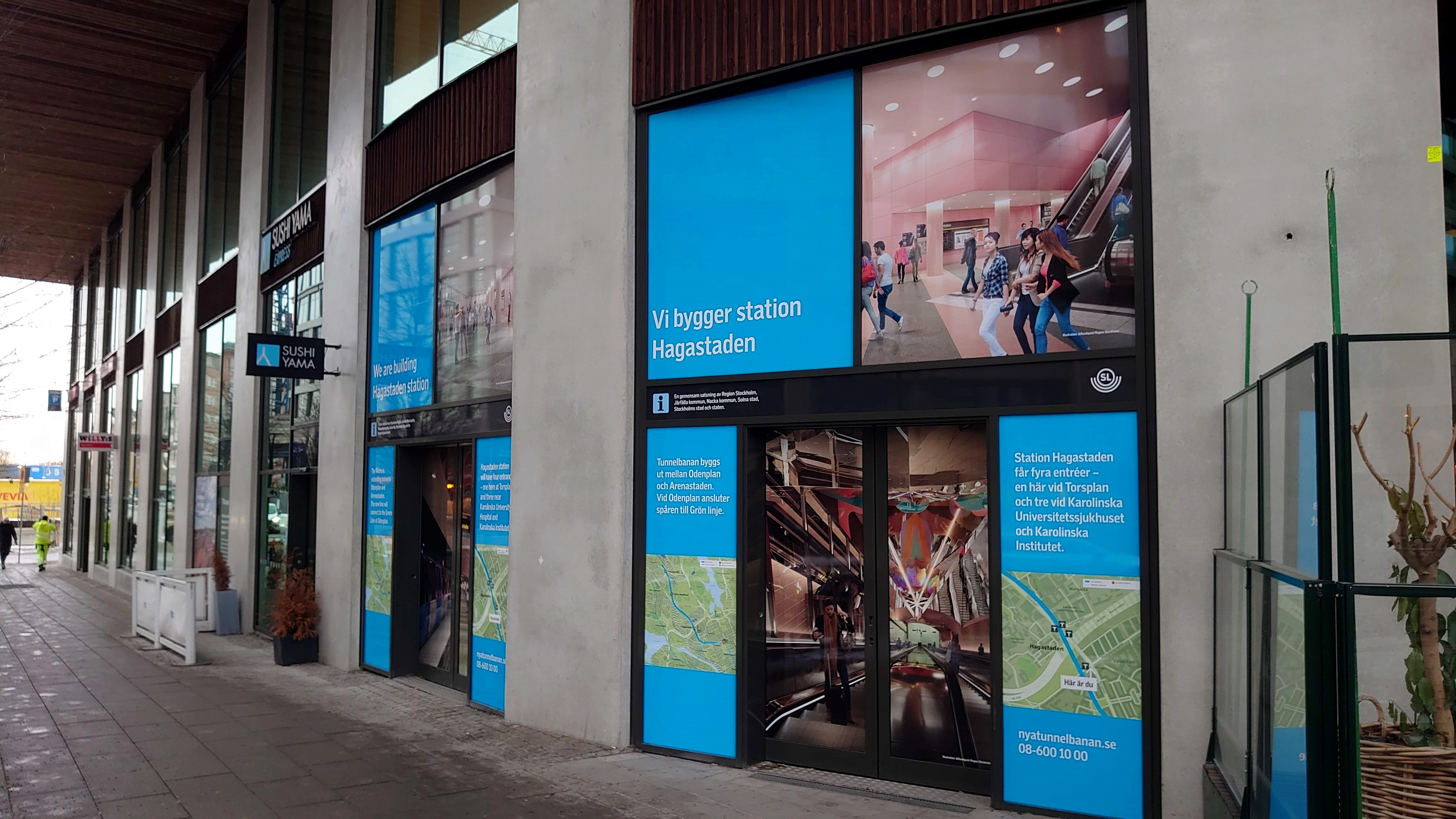
- Future station entrance at Torsplan

General information
- Location: Hagastaden, Solna Municipality and Stockholm Municipality
- Coordinates: 59.347756°N 18.029891°E
- System: Future Stockholm Metro station
- Owner: Region Stockholm
- Transit authority: SL
- Line: Green Line
- Platforms: 1 island platform
- Tracks: 2

Construction
- Structure type: Underground
- Depth: 20 m (66 ft)

History
- Opening: 2028

Services
Preceding station: Odenplan
Following station: Södra Hagalund
Location

Hagastaden is a future station on the Stockholm Metro's Green Line, expected to open in 2028. It is located between the existing Odenplan station and the new Södra Hagalund station, serving the new district of Hagastaden. The station will be located in both Solna and Stockholm municipalities, with entrances on both sides of the municipal border.

== Location and entrances ==
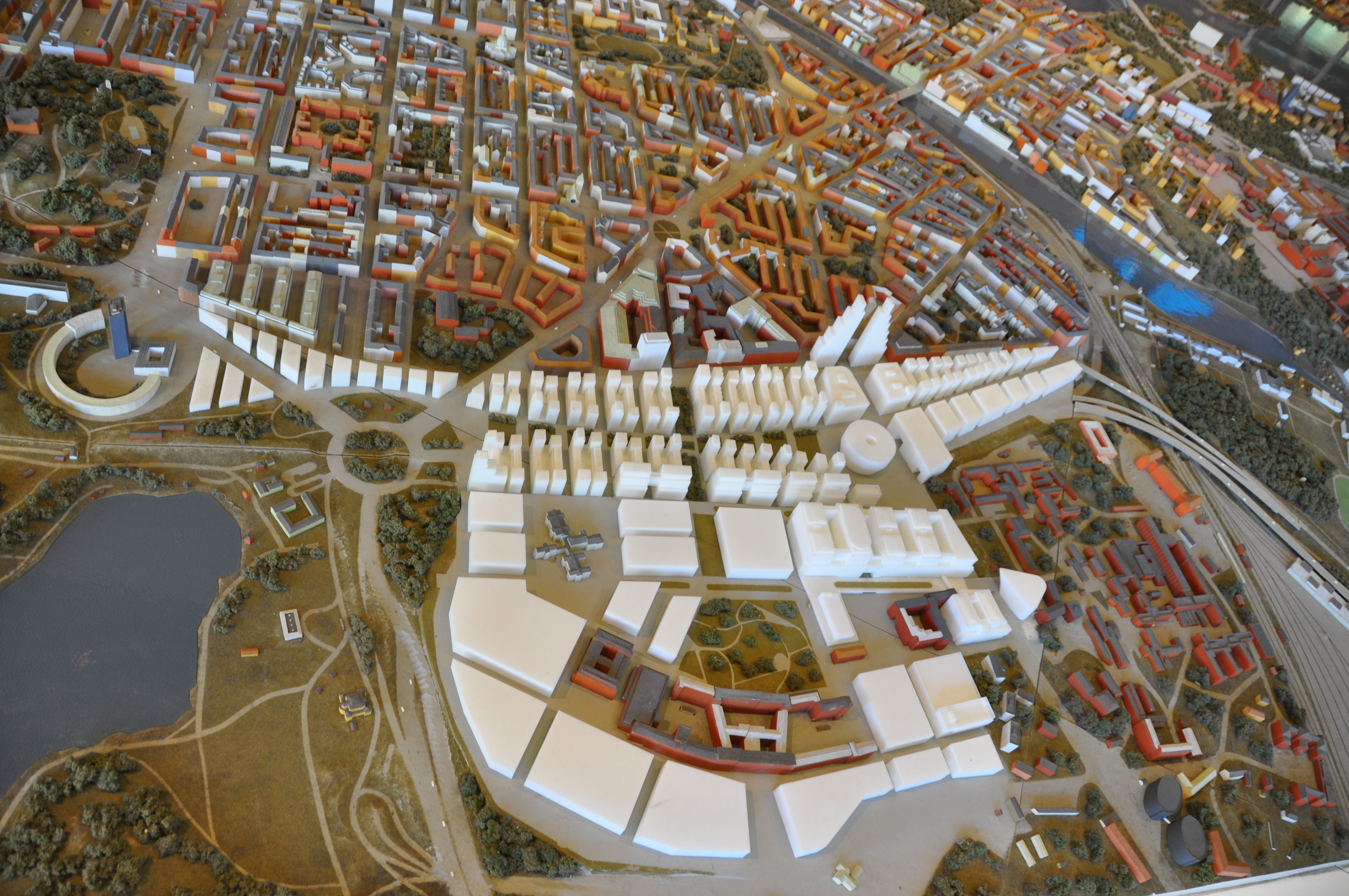
Model of the Hagastaden development

Hagastaden station will have two main exits. The southern exit, located at Torsplan, will be situated in the southern part of the station within Stockholm. The northern exit will be at Hagaplan, near Karolinska University Hospital and Karolinska Institute in Solna. The station will be located 20 meters underground, and it is projected to handle approximately 3,800 passengers per hour during peak times by 2030.

== Construction ==
Construction on Hagastaden station is part of the Green Line extension towards Arenastaden. The tunnelling work, which began in 2020, includes blasting tunnels under Solnavägen and Vasastaden to connect with Odenplan. The expected completion of the station and full operational status is scheduled for 2028. The construction also involves creating the station's platforms, ticket halls, and various structural elements.

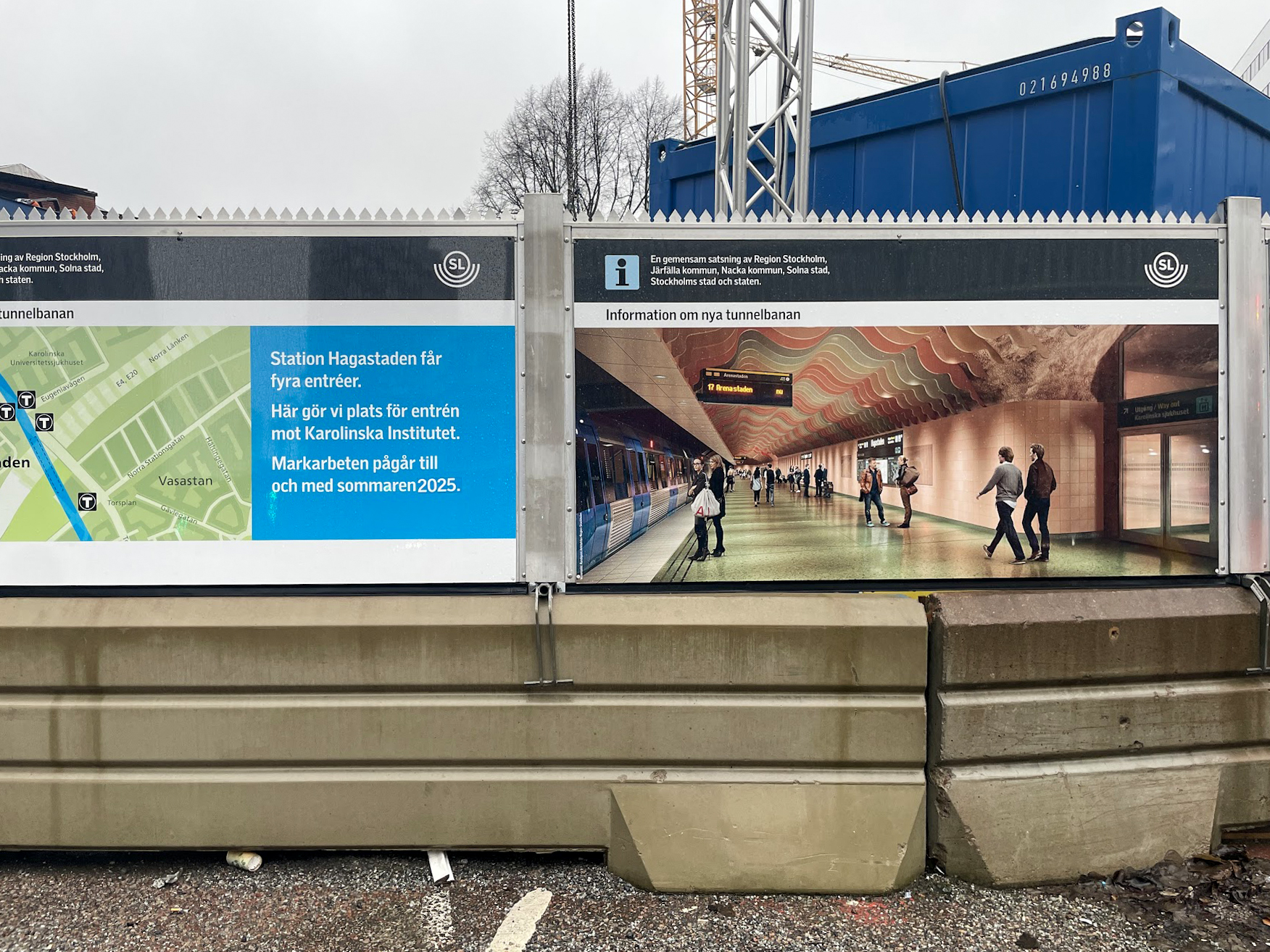
Construction hoarding on Solnavägen in January 2025

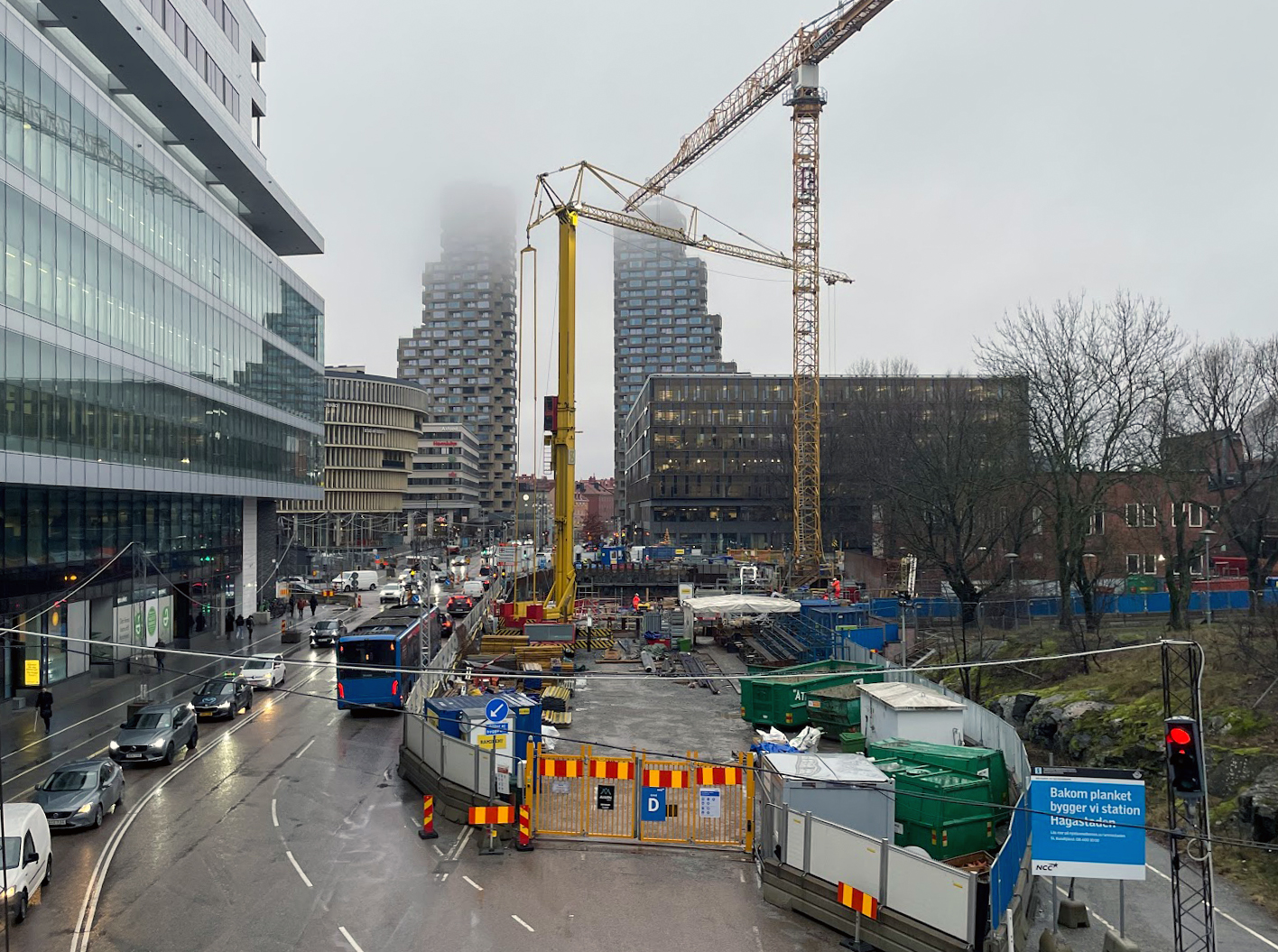
Station construction on Solnavägen in January 2025

== Line name change ==
Hagastaden station will be part of the Green Line, though the branch between Odenplan and Arenastaden was previously referred to as the "Yellow Line" in earlier metro expansion plans. In May 2023, it was confirmed that this section will now be shown as a branch of the Green Line, and not a separate but interlined route. The "Yellow Line" designation will instead be used for a completely new metro line, which will run between Fridhemsplan and Älvsjö, and is expected to be completed by around 2035.
