= Arenastaden metro station =

Future station on the Stockholm Metro

Arenastaden
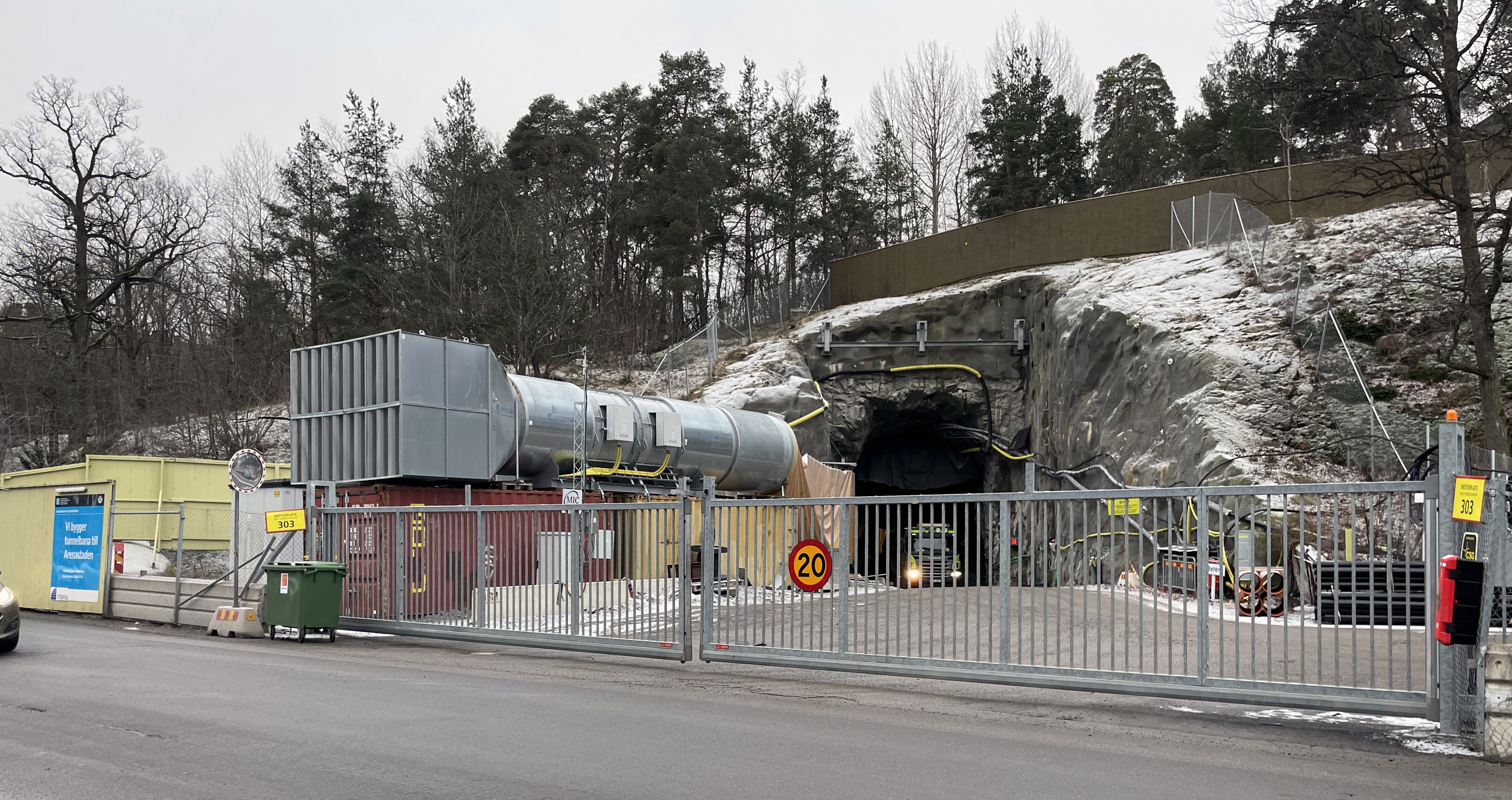
- Arenastaden Metro Station construction in February 2025

General information
- Location: Solna Municipality
- Coordinates: 59°21′47.5″N 18°00′29.3″E
- System: Future Stockholm Metro station
- Line: Green Line
- Platforms: 1 platform
- Tracks: 2
- Connections: Solna railway station: Tvärbanan, Stockholm commuter rail

Construction
- Structure type: Underground
- Depth: 35 m (115 ft)

History
- Opening: 2028

Services
Preceding station: Södra Hagalund
Following station: (Terminus)
Location

Arenastaden is a future station on the Stockholm Metro's Green Line, expected to open in 2028. It will be the terminus of a new branch from Odenplan. The station will serve the area of Arenastaden in Solna, which includes the Mall of Scandinavia and the National football arena (known as Strawberry Arena). Arenastaden station will be located near to Solna railway station, although without a direct transfer to it. Construction of the line began in 2020 and it is scheduled to open in 2028.

== Location and design ==
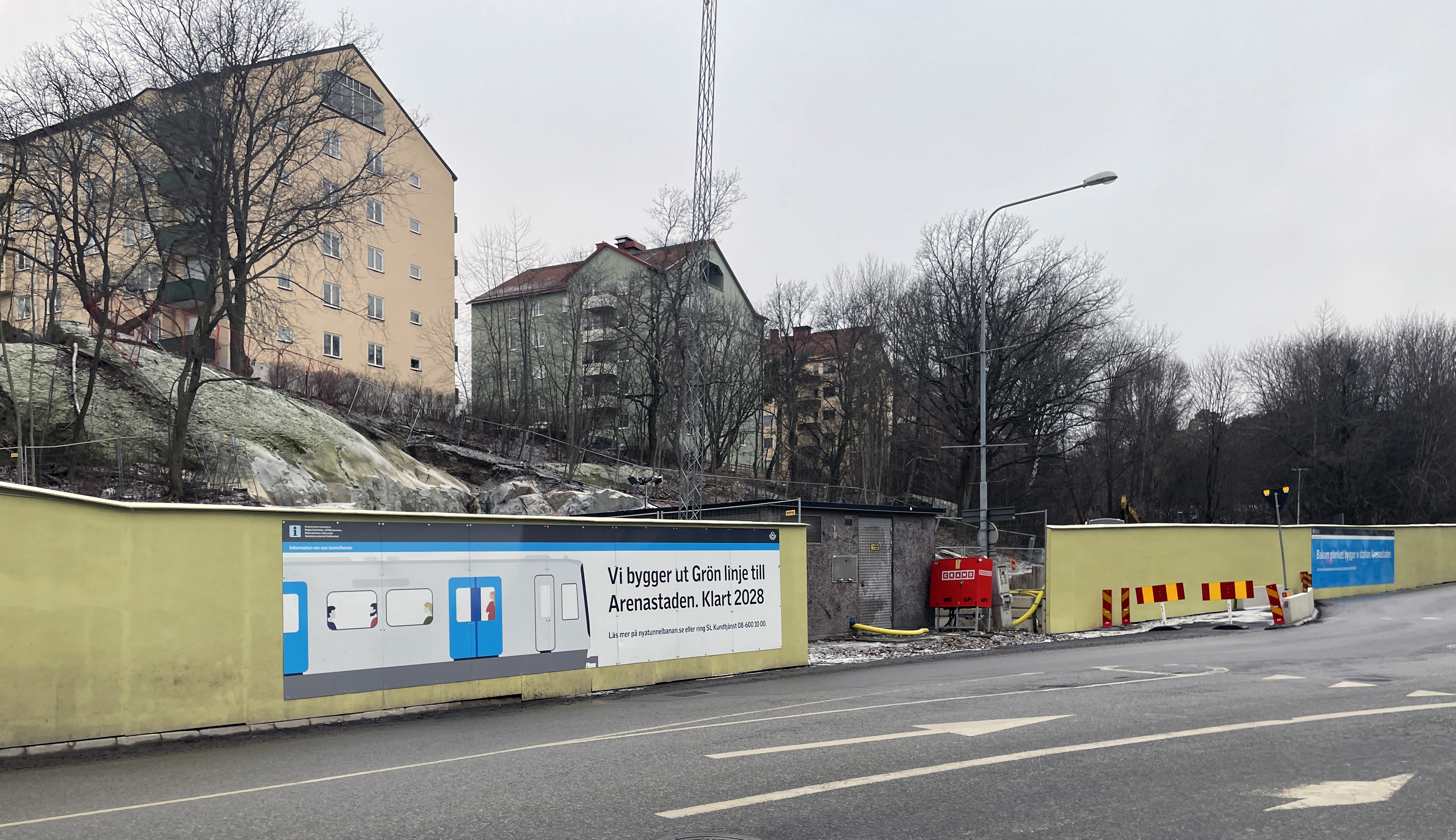
Dalvägen Entrance under construction

Arenastaden station will have two entrances: the northern entrance along Dalvägen and the southern entrance at Hagalund via Hagalundsgatan. The southern entrance will allow transfers to the adjacent Tvärbanan tram terminus, and the nearby Solna commuter rail station.

The station will be constructed approximately 35 meters underground and will feature one island platform. The design will include escalators and lifts. The artistic design of the station is being led by artist Inges Idee.

== Travel times ==
Once operational, the travel time from Arenastaden to T-Centralen will be approximately 11 minutes with no transfers required. Other travel times include 7 minutes to Odenplan and 20 minutes to Gullmarsplan.

== Line name change ==
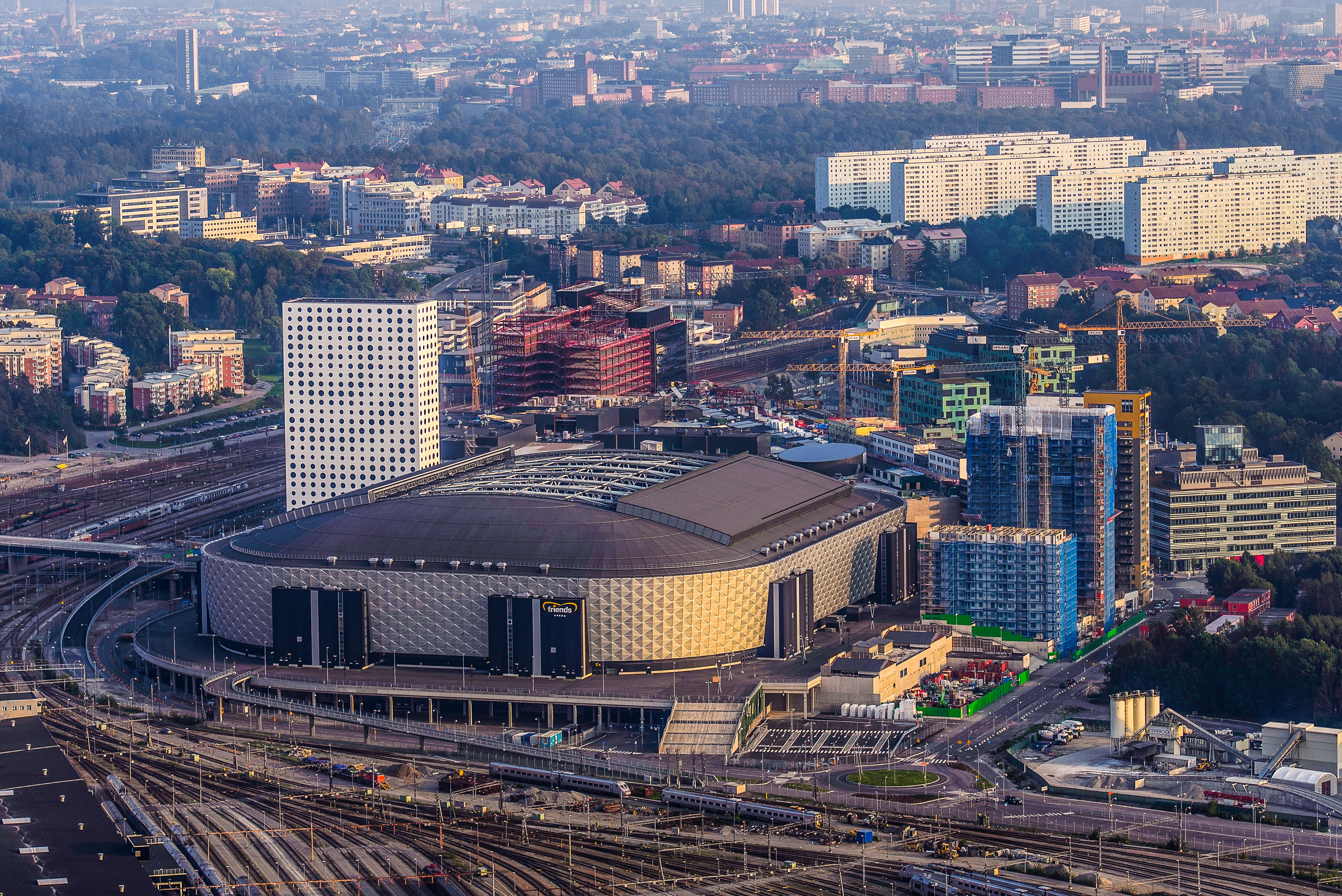
The Arenastaden area including Nationalarenan

Arenastaden station will be part of the Green Line, though the branch from Odenplan was previously referred to as the "Yellow Line" in earlier metro expansion plans. In May 2023, it was confirmed that this section will now be shown as a branch of the Green Line, and not a separate but interlined route. The "Yellow Line" designation will instead be used for a completely new metro line, which will run between Fridhemsplan and Älvsjö, and is expected to be completed by around 2035.
