= Södra Hagalund metro station =

Future station on the Stockholm Metro

Södra Hagalund
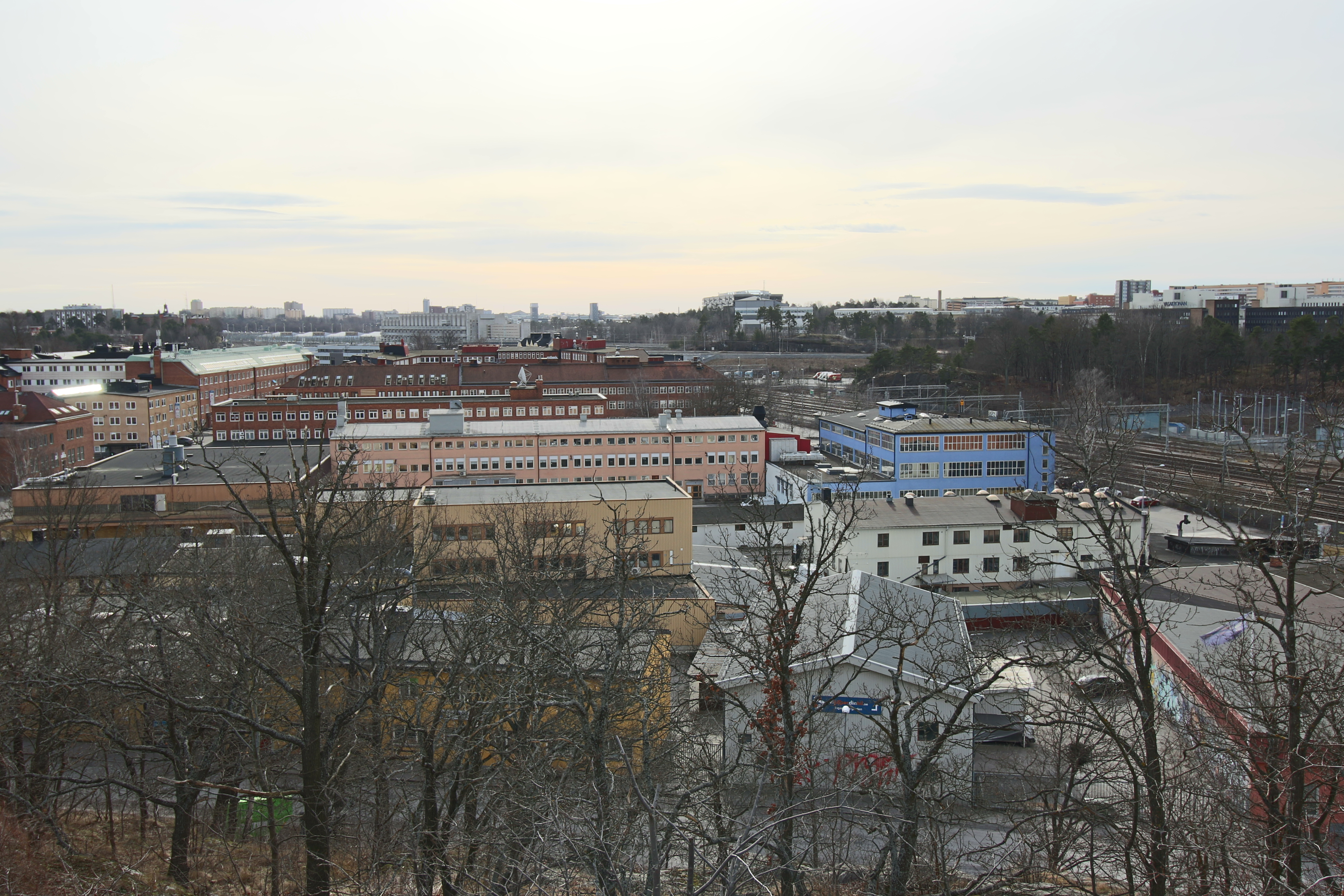
- Hagalund industrial area in 2021

General information
- Location: Solna Municipality
- Coordinates: 59.354000°N 18.014667°E
- System: Future Stockholm Metro station
- Line: Green Line
- Platforms: 1 island platform
- Tracks: 2

Construction
- Structure type: Underground
- Depth: 45 m (148 ft)

History
- Opening: 2028

Services
Preceding station: Hagastaden
Following station: Arenastaden
Location

Södra Hagalund is a future station on the Stockholm Metro's Green Line, in Solna Municipality, planned to open in 2028. It is located in the current Hagalund industrial area, which is being redeveloped. The station will be situated 45 meters underground and will feature entrances on both sides of Solnavägen.

== Location and surrounding area ==
The Södra Hagalund station will include two main entrances: one located in the current Hagalund industrial area at Gelbgjutarevägen and another along Solnavägen. The area surrounding Södra Hagalund station is expected to see large growth, with plans for mixed-use development that includes residential and office spaces, aimed at transforming the industrial area a new neighbourhood.

== Construction ==
Construction of the Södra Hagalund station is part of the extension of the Green Line towards Arenastaden. Tunnelling work commenced in 2020 and includes infrastructure such as tracks, platforms, and ticket halls. The station is expected to open in 2028.

== Line name change ==
Södra Hagalund station will be part of the Green Line, though the branch between Odenplan and Arenastaden was previously referred to as the "Yellow Line" in earlier metro expansion plans. In May 2023, it was confirmed that this section will now be shown as a branch of the Green Line, and not a separate but interlined route. The "Yellow Line" designation will instead be used for a completely new metro line, which will run between Fridhemsplan and Älvsjö, and is expected to be completed by around 2035.
