= Odenplan metro station =

Odenplan
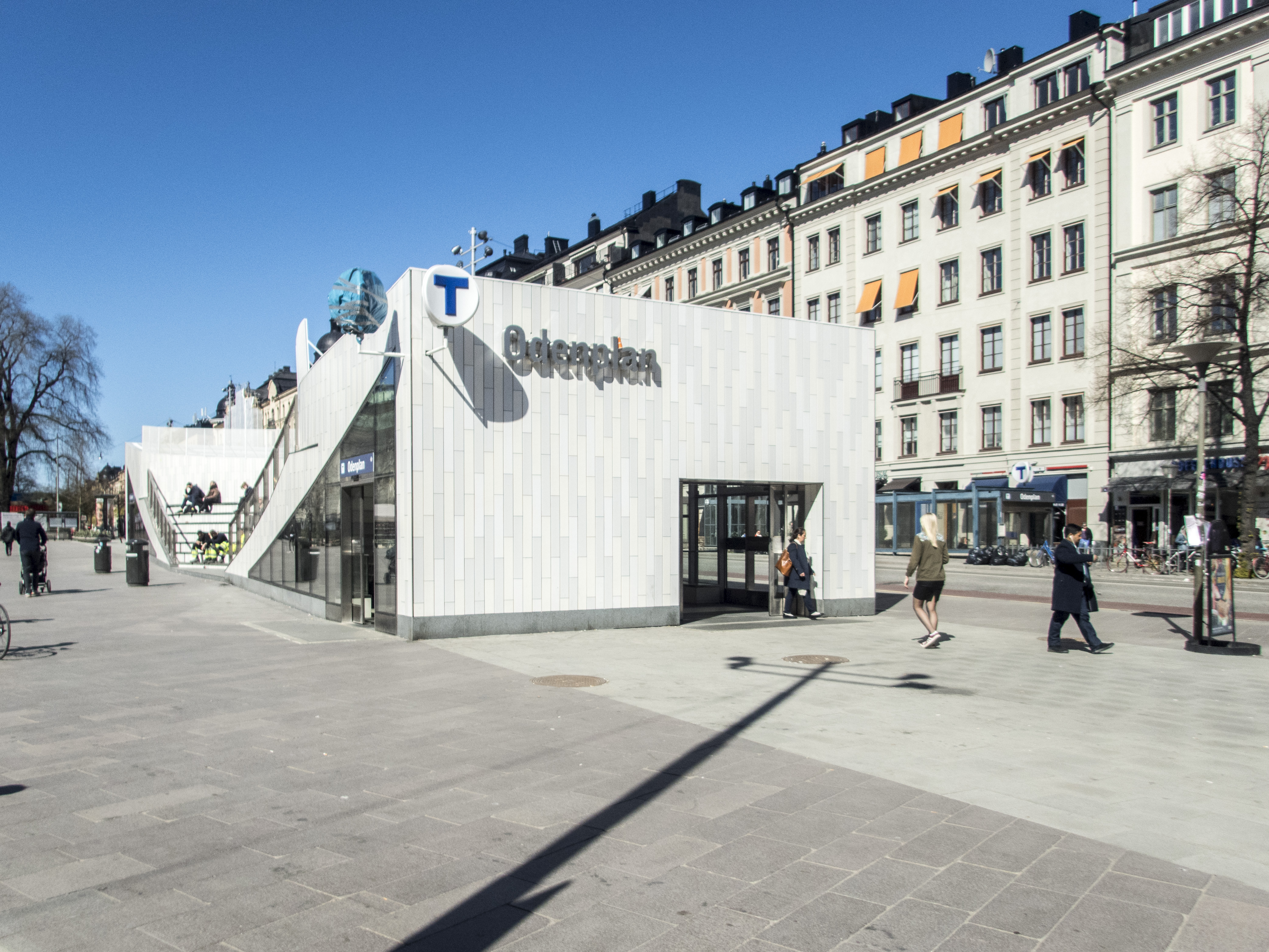
- Odenplan station

General information
- Location: Stockholm, Sweden
- System: Stockholm Metro
- Owner: Storstockholms Lokaltrafik
- Operator: Storstockholms Lokaltrafik
- Line: Green Line
- Platforms: 1 island platform
- Tracks: 2
- Connections: Commuter rail (Stockholm Odenplan station)

Construction
- Structure type: Underground
- Depth: 9 m

Other information
- Station code: ODP

History
- Opened: 26 October 1952

Passengers
- 2019: 43,750 boardings per weekday

Services
Preceding station	Stockholm Metro	Following station
St Eriksplan towards Åkeshov	Line 17	Rådmansgatan towards Skarpnäck
St Eriksplan towards Alvik	Line 18	Rådmansgatan towards Farsta strand
St Eriksplan towards Hässelby strand	Line 19	Rådmansgatan towards Hagsätra
Location

Odenplan is a station on the Green Line of the Stockholm Metro, located beneath Odenplan in the Vasastan district of central Stockholm, Sweden. Opened on 26 October 1952, it formed part of the original section of the Green Line between Hötorget and Vällingby. The station is served by metro routes 17, 18 and 19, which connect central Stockholm with the western and southern suburbs.

Odenplan also forms a major interchange with Stockholm Odenplan station on the commuter rail network. The commuter-rail platforms are located directly beneath the metro station. They share street-level entrances at Odenplan and allow passengers to transfer between the two rail systems without exiting the station. The commuter-rail station opened on 10 July 2017 as part of the Citybanan project.

== Location and facilities ==
Odenplan metro station is situated beneath Odenplan, a public square in the Vasastan district. It lies approximately 3.4 kilometres from Slussen metro station, the reference point used for measuring distances on the Stockholm Metro.

The metro station has one underground island platform serving trains in both directions. The platform is approximately 9 metres below street level. Entrances provide access from Odenplan and nearby streets, and the station is connected to the commuter-rail station below by interchange passages.

The station is served by Green Line routes 17, 18 and 19. These routes run between the western and southern branches of the Green Line, with trains stopping at Odenplan in both directions.

== History ==
Planform with escalator down to Commuter Rail platforms

Odenplan station opened on 26 October 1952, when the section of the Stockholm Metro between Hötorget and Vällingby was inaugurated. The station was part of the expansion of the city's metro network into the western suburbs.

The station was subsequently connected to the Stockholm commuter rail network through the construction of the Citybanan railway tunnel. The commuter-rail station, named Stockholm Odenplan, opened on 10 July 2017. The project included new underground platforms and interchange facilities connecting the commuter railway with the existing metro station.. The new commuter-rail station replaced the nearby Karlberg railway station as a stop on the commuter network.

== Future ==
=== Green Line extension ===
Odenplan is expected to become part of a larger Green Line network following the planned extension towards Arenastaden. The project will add new stations north of Odenplan, including Hagastaden and Arenastaden. The extension is intended to improve public transport connections to the developing areas around Hagastaden and Arenastaden. An updated project forecast published by Region Stockholm in 2026 projected that the extension would open in the fourth quarter of 2029.

=== Roslagsbanan to the city centre ===
A further planned railway project, known as Roslagsbanan to the city centre (Roslagsbanan till city), would bring the narrow-gauge suburban railway into a new underground route from the north-eastern suburbs towards central Stockholm. The proposed route includes a station at Odenplan, providing an additional interchange with the metro and commuter rail networks.

Plans for the Odenplan station include platforms beneath the existing commuter-rail station, with escalators and connecting passages to the other transport systems. The project would require changes to parts of the existing underground interchange areas. The project is being developed by Region Stockholm. Its construction and opening timetable remains subject to planning and project decisions.

== See also ==
- Stockholm Odenplan station – the adjoining commuter-rail station
- Odenplan – the square after which the station is named
- Stockholm Metro
