= Ulriksdal railway station =

Railway station in Solna, Sweden

Ulriksdal
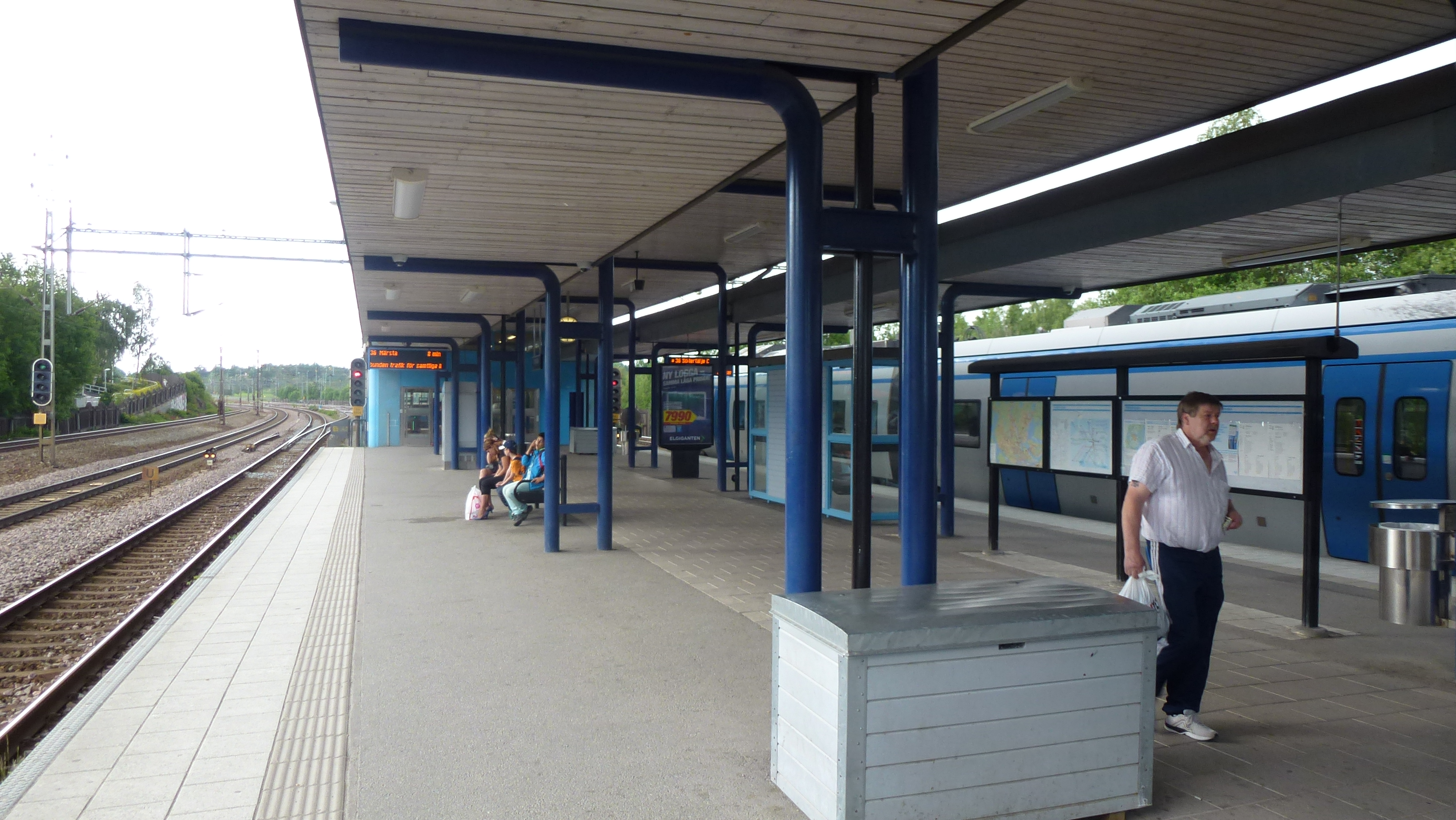

General information
- Location: Stockholm County
- Coordinates: 59.3844°N 18.0139°E
- System: Pendeltåg
- Owner: Swedish Transport Administration
- Platforms: Island Platform
- Tracks: 4

Construction
- Structure type: Elevated

Other information
- Station code: Udl

History
- Opened: 1866 (current station 1990)
- Former names: Järva (until 1921)

Passengers
- 2015: 3,600 boarding per weekday (commuter rail)

Services
Preceding station	Stockholm commuter rail	Following station
Helenelund towards Uppsala C	40	Solna towards Södertälje Centrum
Helenelund towards Märsta	41	Solna towards Södertälje Centrum
Helenelund towards Märsta	42X	Solna towards Nynäshamn
Location

Ulriksdal is a station on Stockholm's commuter rail network, located 7.1 km north of Stockholm Central Station in the Järva area within Solna Municipality. The station consists of a single island platform with a ticket hall on the platform, accessible via an underground pedestrian tunnel. As of 2015, the station had approximately 3,600 boardings per weekday. The station is located approximately 1.4 km south-west of Ulriksdal Palace.

== History ==
The original station was opened in 1866 as part of the Northern Main Line, which is now part of the Ostkustbanan. Initially named Järva, the station was renamed Ulriksdal in 1921, following the opening of Ulriksdal Racecourse nearby in 1919. The name change also aimed to prevent confusion with stations like Järna and Järle.

When Stockholm's commuter rail network was launched in 1968, the station remained largely unchanged due to uncertainty about the area's future development. However, after the original station building was damaged in a fire in 1979 and later demolished in the early 1980s, the need for modernization became apparent. In August 1990, a new commuter train station with four tracks and an island platform was opened as part of the expansion of the railway to four tracks.

For many years, the station had an entrance on the southern side toward Ritorp, which was later removed due to structural issues. Solna Municipality had promised a replacement, but as of 2024, no new entrance has been built despite significant residential development in the area.

North of Ulriksdal station, a now-defunct military railway branch known as the Krutbanan existed from 1941 until the late 1980s. The 3 km-long line was used for military logistics and connected westward from the main railway line.

== Future developments ==
A 2021 report by the Swedish Transport Administration highlighted congestion issues at Ulriksdal station, particularly during peak hours. Recommendations included the construction of an additional pedestrian bridge to improve access and facilitate transfers.

== Gallery ==
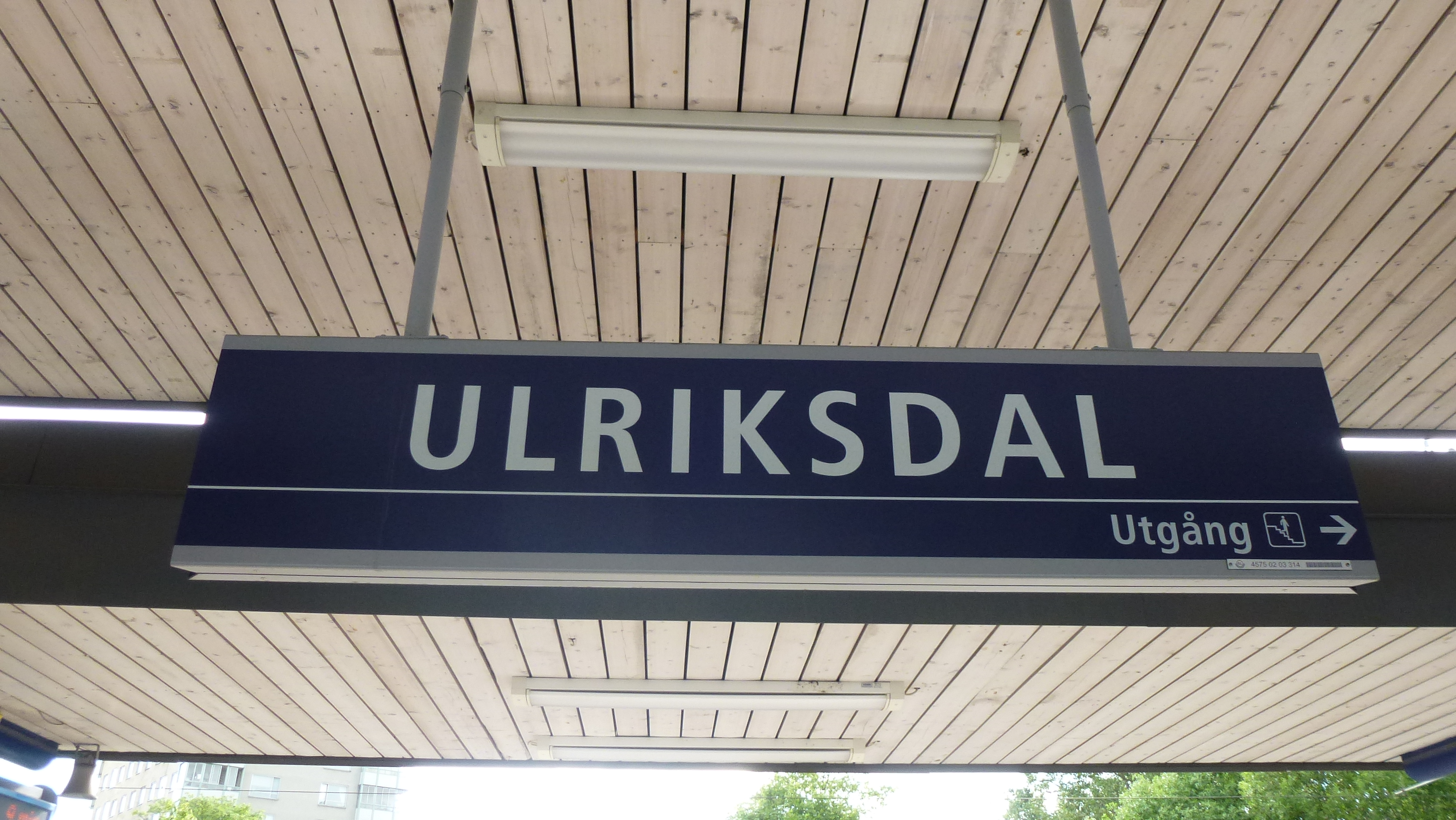

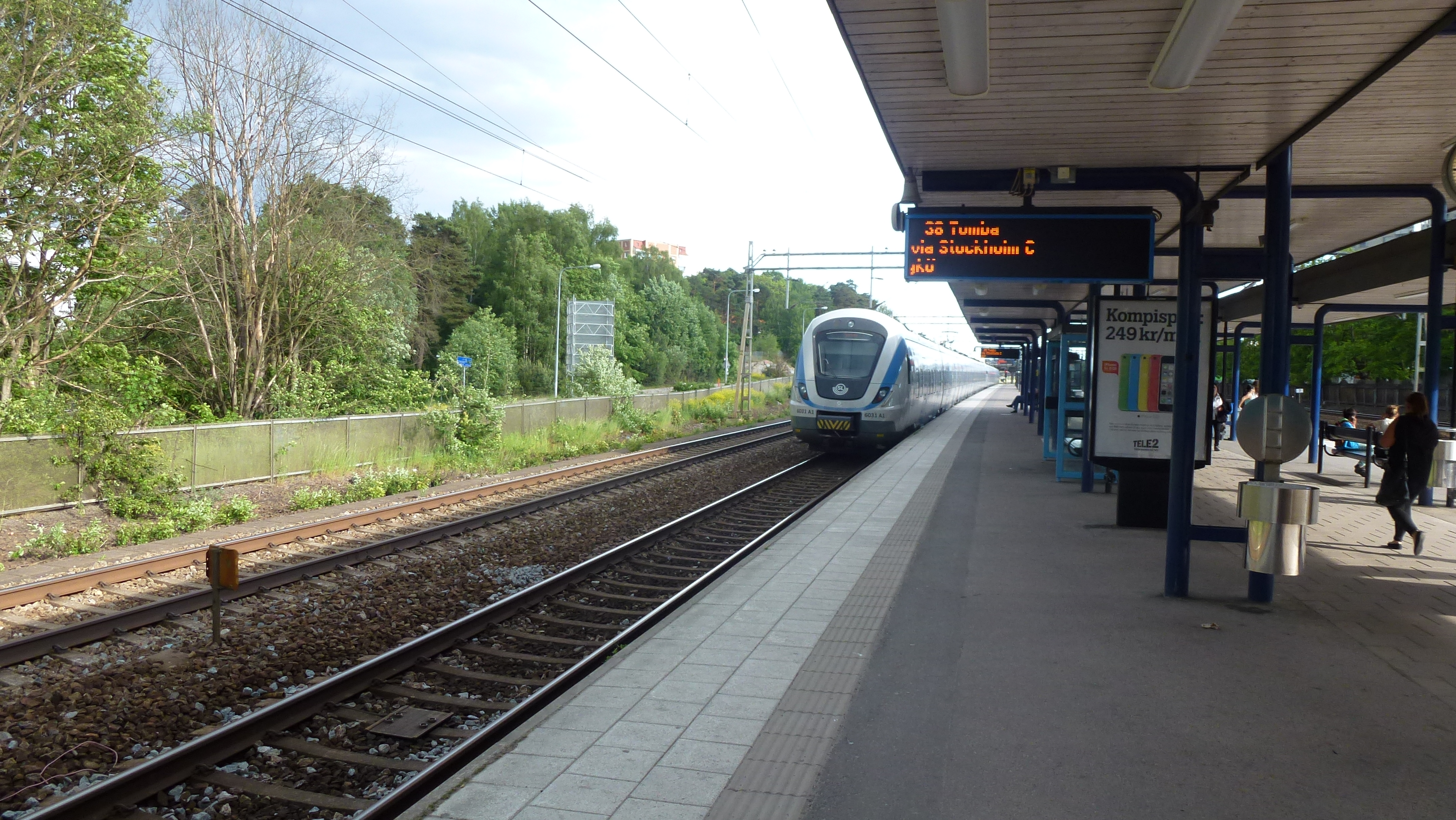

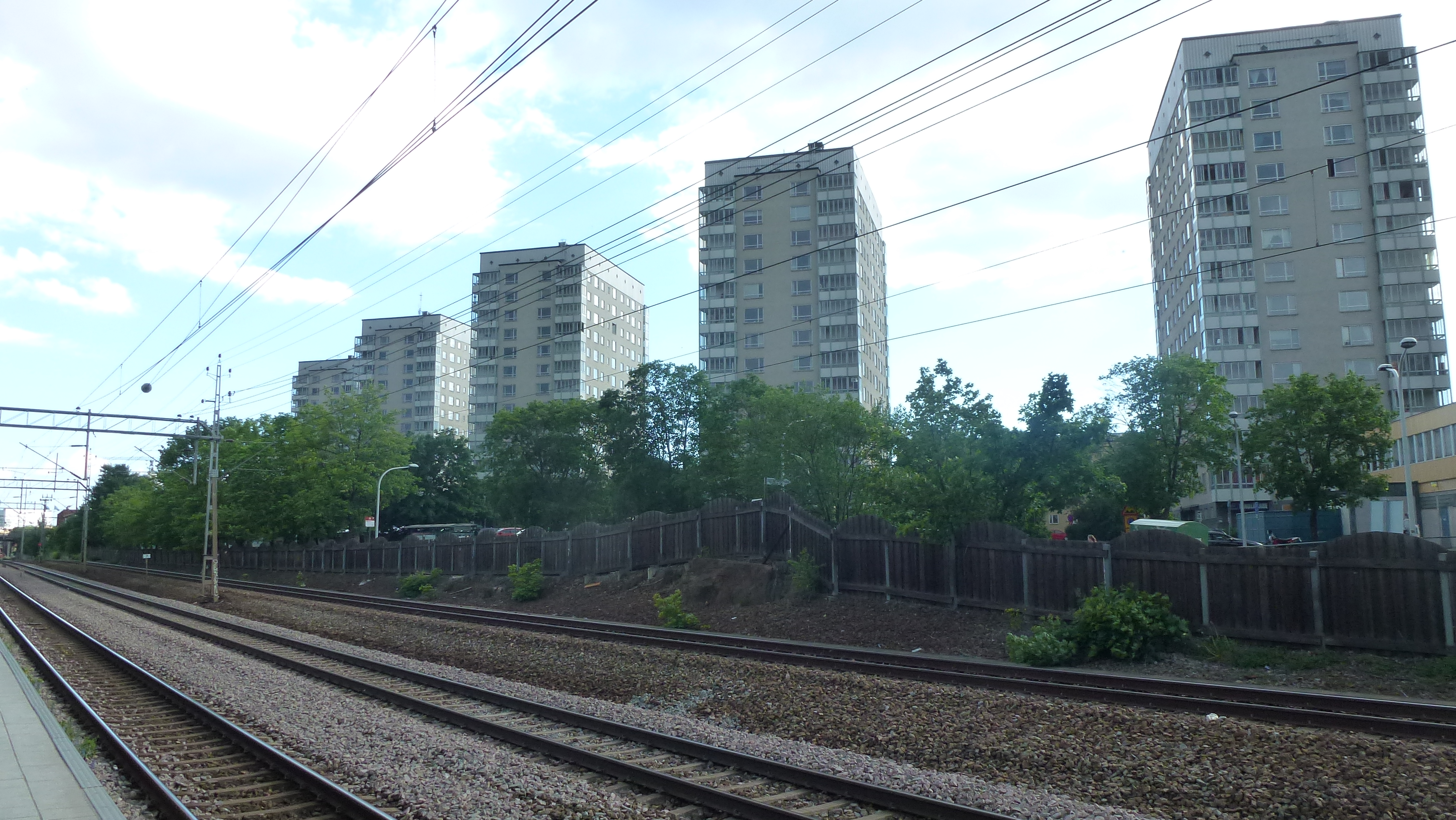

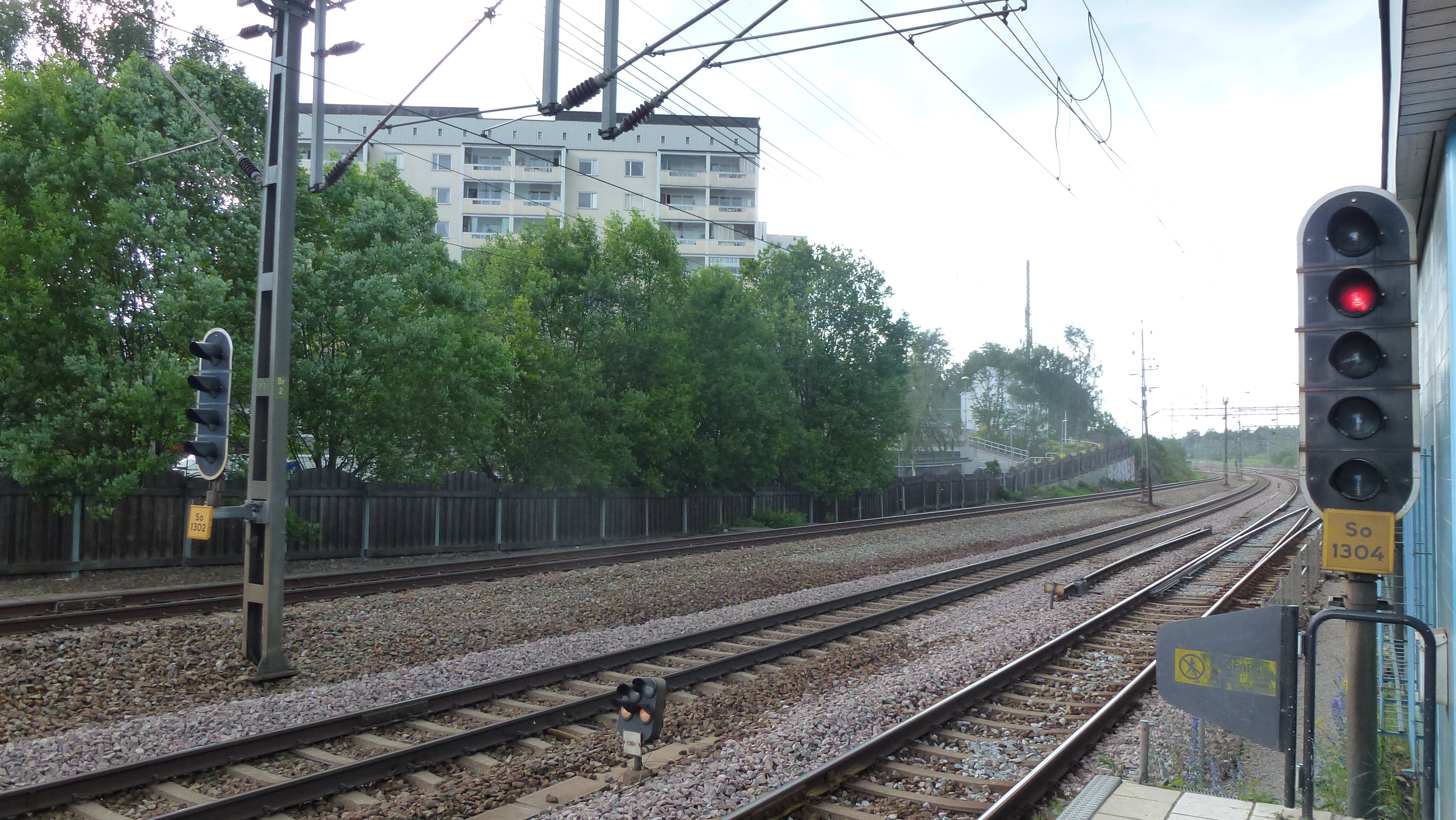

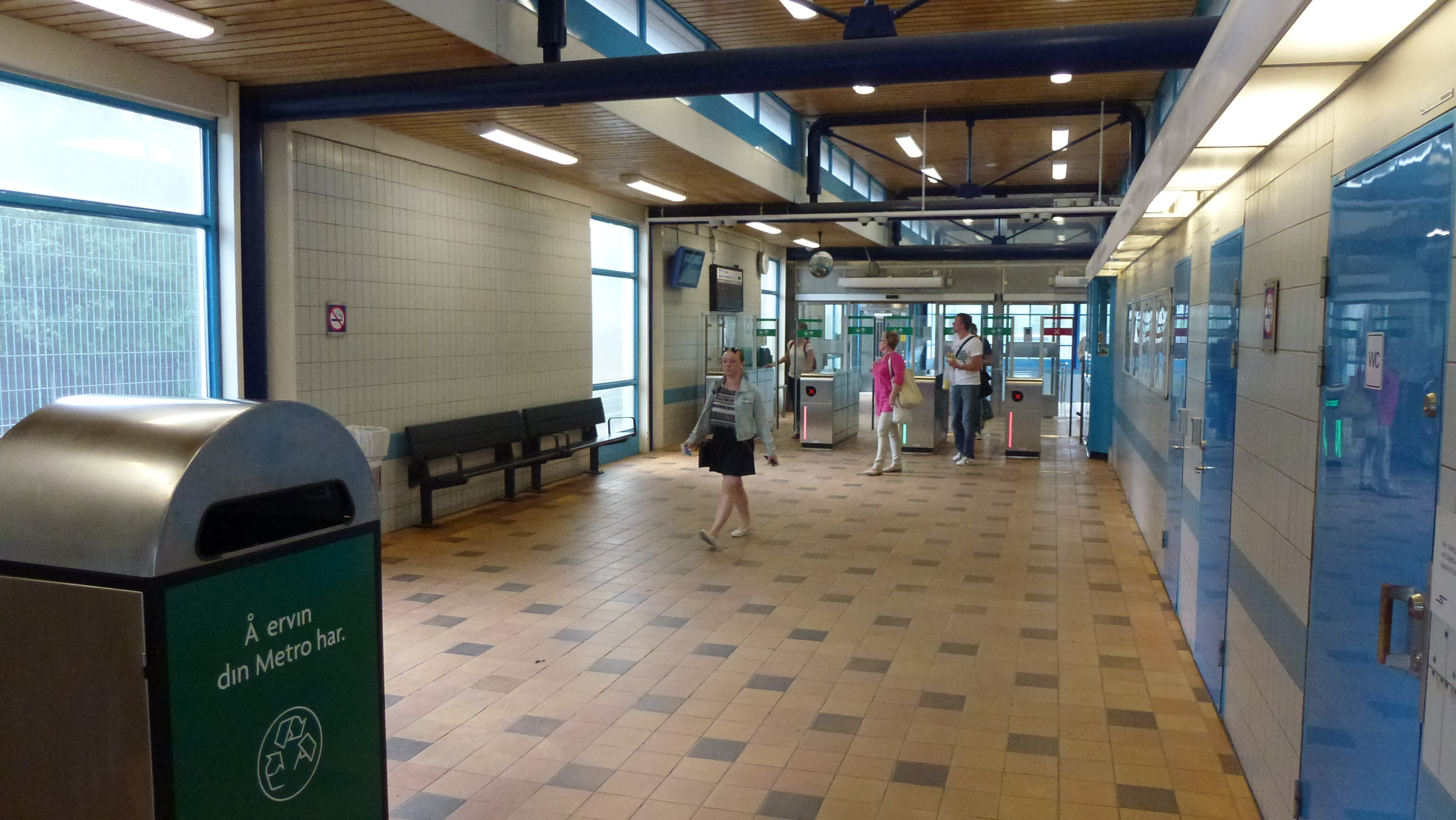

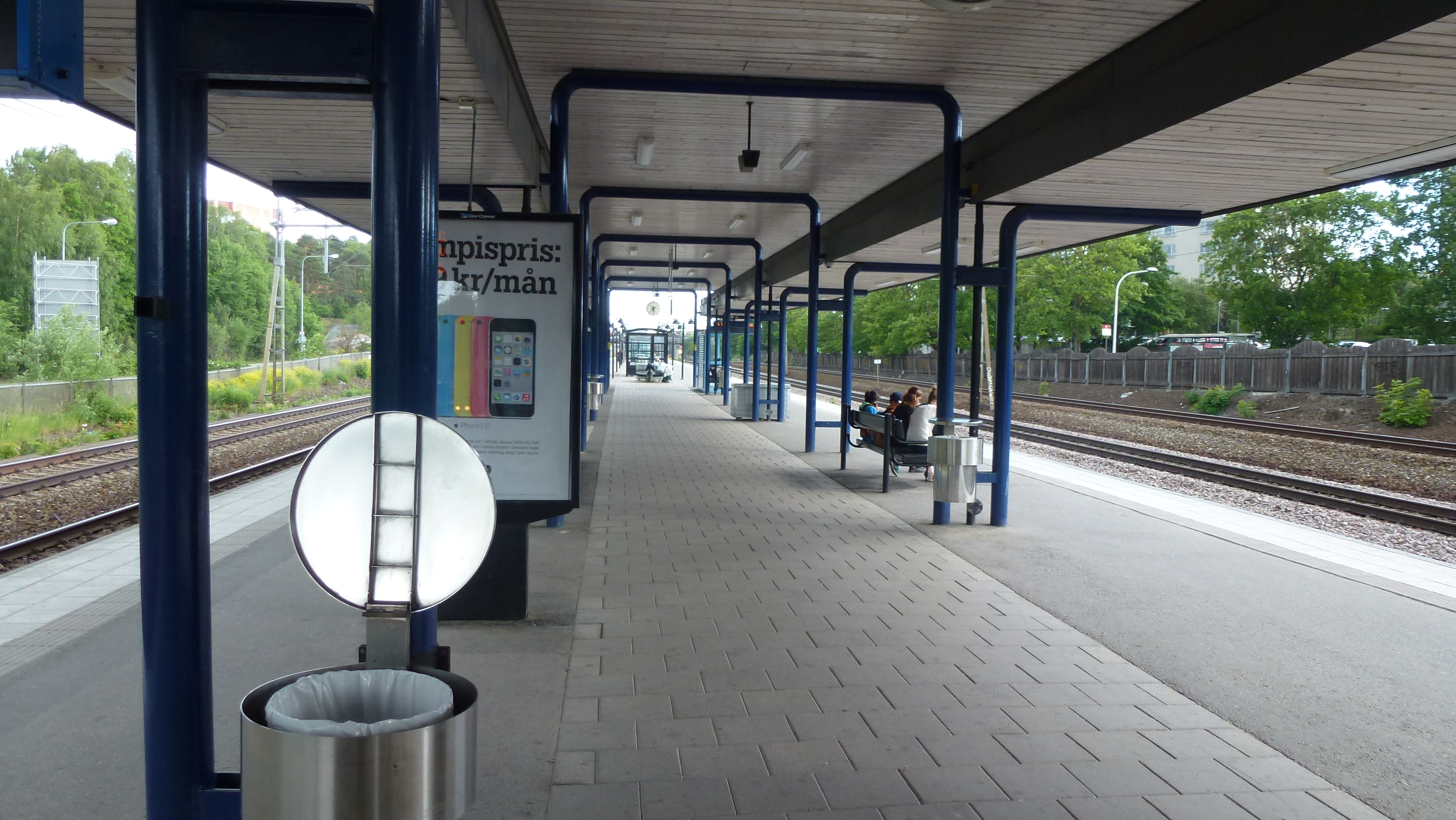

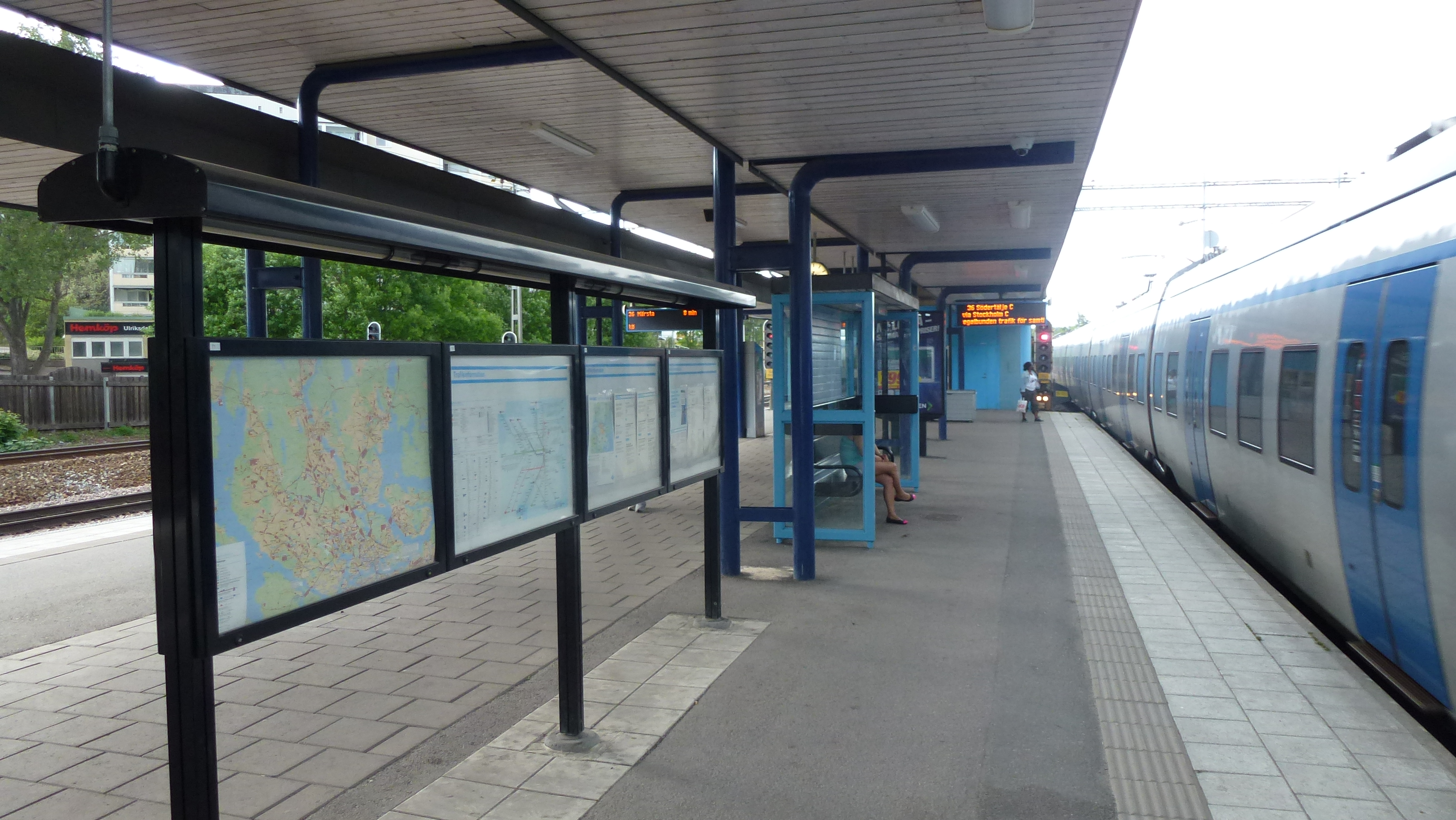

== See also ==
- Stockholm commuter rail
