= Solna railway station =

Railway station in Solna, Sweden

Solna
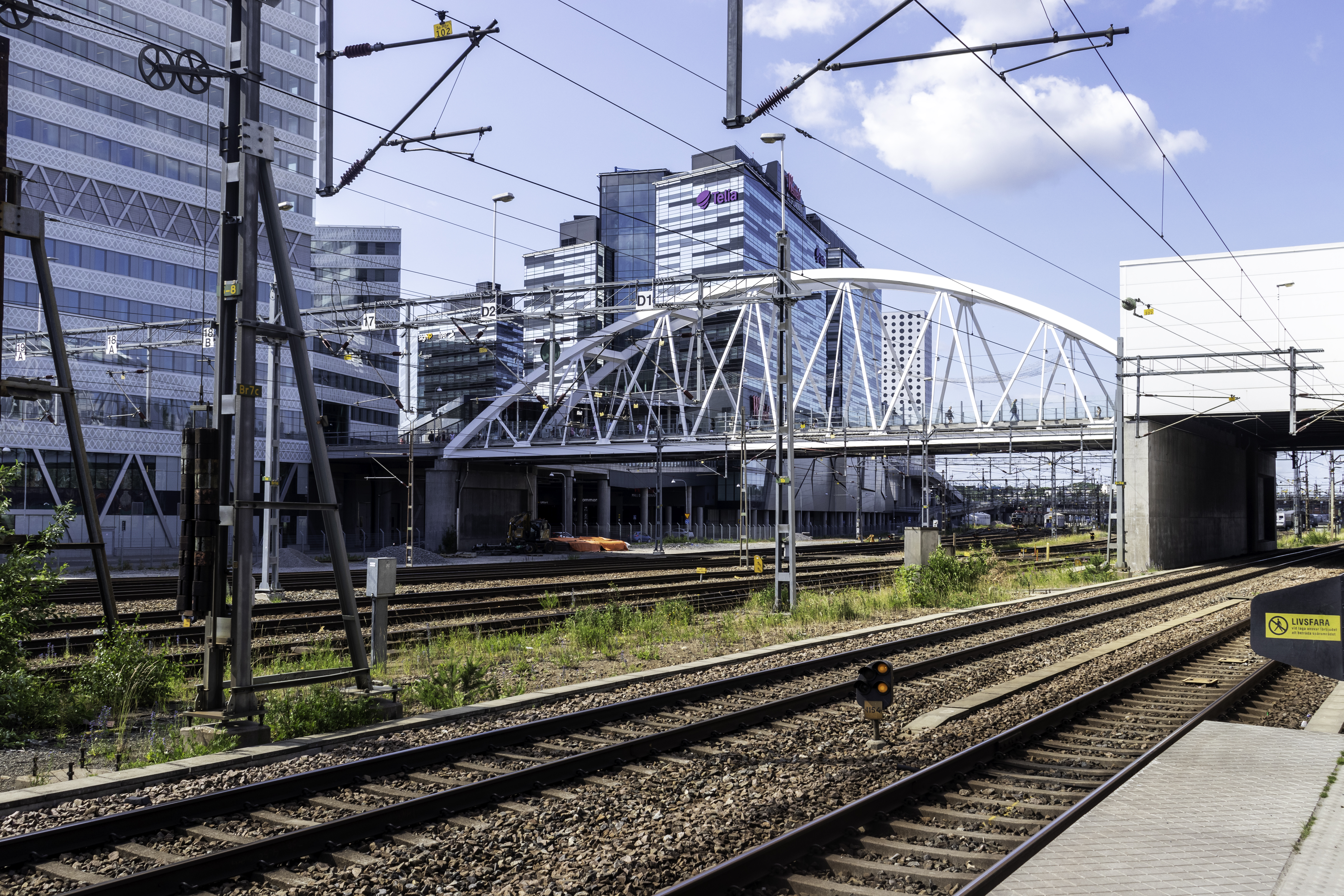
- View in 2023 towards the nearby Westfield Mall of Scandinavia

General information
- Coordinates: 59°22′01″N 18°0′34″E
- System: Pendeltåg
- Platforms: Island

Construction
- Structure type: at-grade

Other information
- Station code: So

History
- Opened: 1895
- Rebuilt: 1911

Passengers
- 2019: 20,900 boarding per weekday (commuter rail)
- 2019: 5,200 boarding per weekday (Tvärbanan)

Services
| Preceding station | Stockholm commuter rail | Following station |
|---|---|---|
| Ulriksdal towards Uppsala C | 40 | Stockholm Odenplan towards Södertälje centrum |
| Ulriksdal towards Märsta | 41 | Stockholm Odenplan towards Södertälje centrum |
| Ulriksdal towards Märsta | 42X | Stockholm Odenplan towards Nynäshamn |

Other services
| Preceding station | SL Local & Light Rail | Following station |
|---|---|---|
| Terminus | Tvärbanan Line 30 | Solna centrum towards Sickla |
Location

Solna is a station in Solna Municipality in Stockholm for commuter trains and the Tvärbanan light rail. The lines J40 (Uppsala C-Södertälje C), J41 (Märsta-Södertälje C), J42 (Märsta-Nynäshamn) and L30 (Sickla-Solna station) stop here, as well as ten bus lines. The commuter train station opened in 1895, but was moved a 100 meters in 1903 and moved again in 1911, when the tunnel through the hill Hagalundsberget to the south was completed. In 1955 the name of the station was changed from "Hagalund" to "Solna". The northern entrance is located at a bridge connecting the Arenastaden and Frösunda areas of the Järva district. Arenastaden is home to the Strawberry Arena and the Westfield Mall of Scandinavia. The southern entrance is located between the districts Hagalund and Råsunda. In 2014 the Tvärbanan line was extended to the south entrance, with a stop called Solna station. A metro station, named "Arenastaden", on a new extension from Odenplan, is planned to have its southern entrance next to the Tvärbanan station, on the other side from the railway station entrance, while the northern exit will be just south of the Arenastaden area. On an average day, 20 900 journeys are done by commuter train from Solna station, 5 200 by Tvärbanan and 4 600 by bus.
