= Helenelund railway station =

Railway station in Sollentuna, Sweden

Helenelund
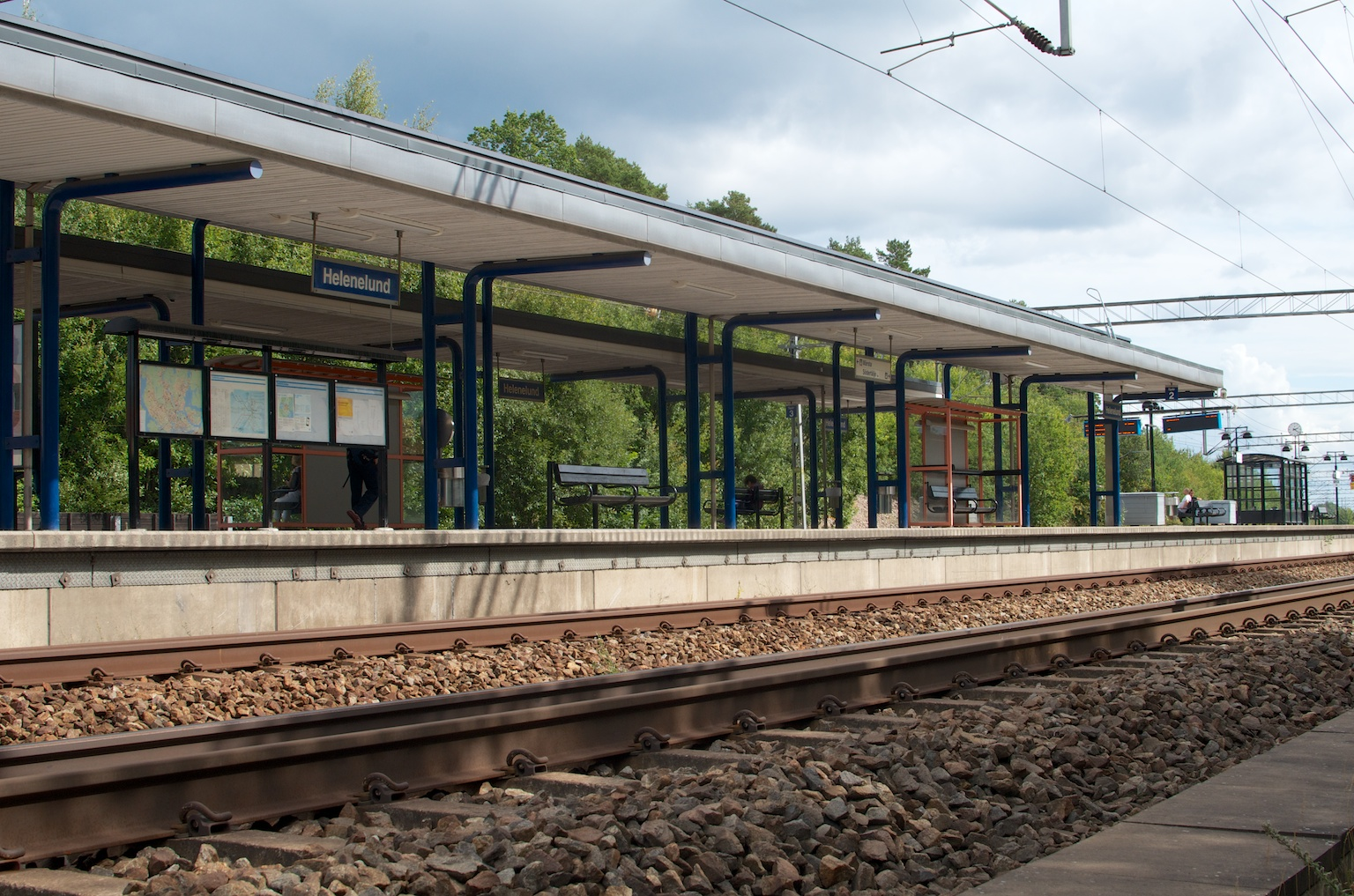

General information
- Location: Stockholm County
- Coordinates: 59.4092°N 17.9622°E
- System: Pendeltåg
- Owner: Swedish Transport Administration
- Platforms: Island Platform
- Tracks: 4
- Connections: Bus terminal

Construction
- Structure type: At-grade

Other information
- Station code: Hel

History
- Opened: 1922 (current station 1994)

Passengers
- 2015: 5,400 boarding per weekday (commuter rail)

Services
Preceding station	Stockholm commuter rail	Following station
Sollentuna towards Uppsala C	40	Ulriksdal towards Södertälje Centrum
Sollentuna towards Märsta	41	Ulriksdal towards Södertälje Centrum
Sollentuna towards Märsta	42X	Ulriksdal towards Nynäshamn

Future Services
Preceding station	SL Local & Light Rail	Following station
Terminus	Tvärbanan Line 31	Kistamässan towards Alviks strand
Location

Helenelund is a station on Stockholm's commuter rail network, located 11.1 km north of Stockholm Central Station in the Helenelund district of Sollentuna Municipality. The station consists of a single island platform, with the entrance located at the northern end, accessible via an underground pedestrian tunnel. As of 2015, the station had approximately 5,400 boardings per weekday. The station is located about 500 meters from the major office district of Kista in Stockholm Municipality, making it a key commuter hub.

== See also ==
- Stockholm commuter rail
