= Vasastan =

Vasastan, or Vasastaden, may refer to:

- Vasastan, Stockholm, a district in Stockholm, Sweden
- Vasastan, Gothenburg, a district in Gothenburg, Sweden
- Vasastaden, Linköping, a district in Linköping, Sweden
