= Odenplan =

Square in central Stockholm, Sweden

Coordinates: 59°20′34″N 18°02′59″E

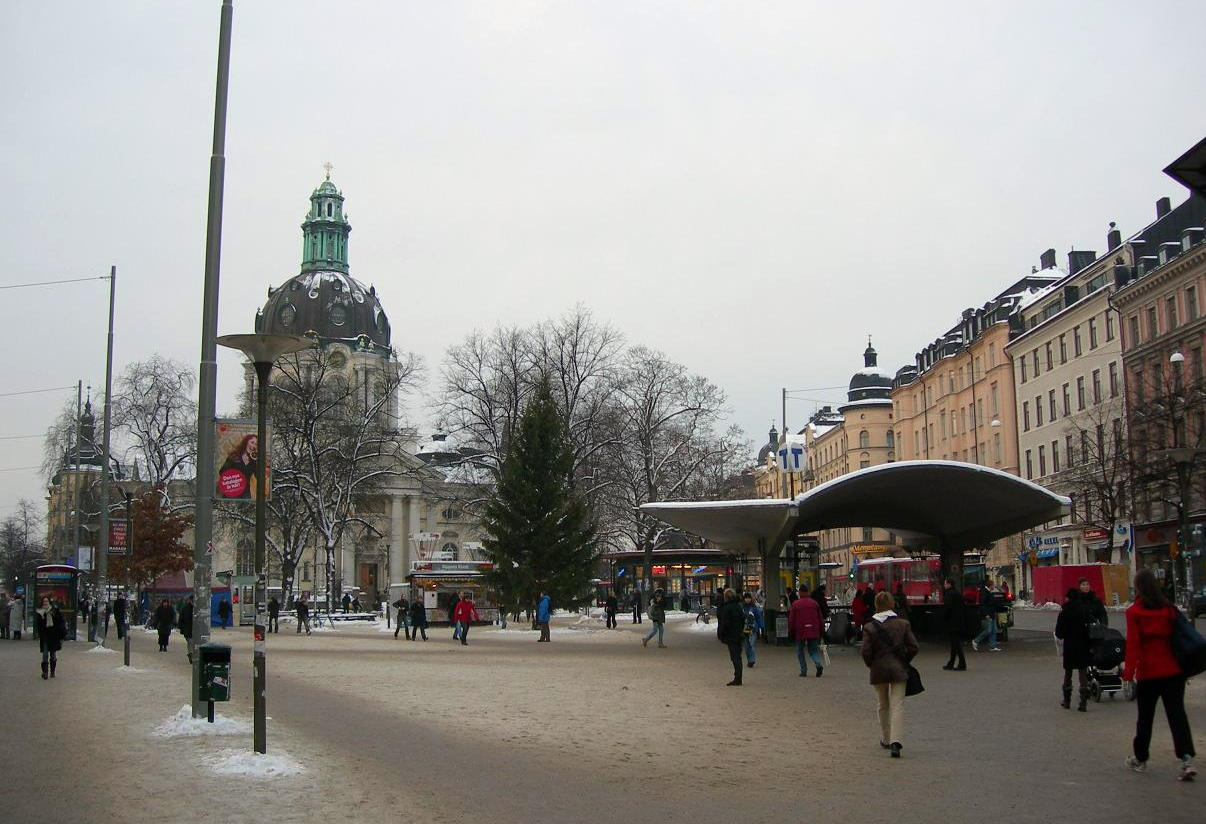
Odenplan with Gustaf Vasa Church in the background, 2006

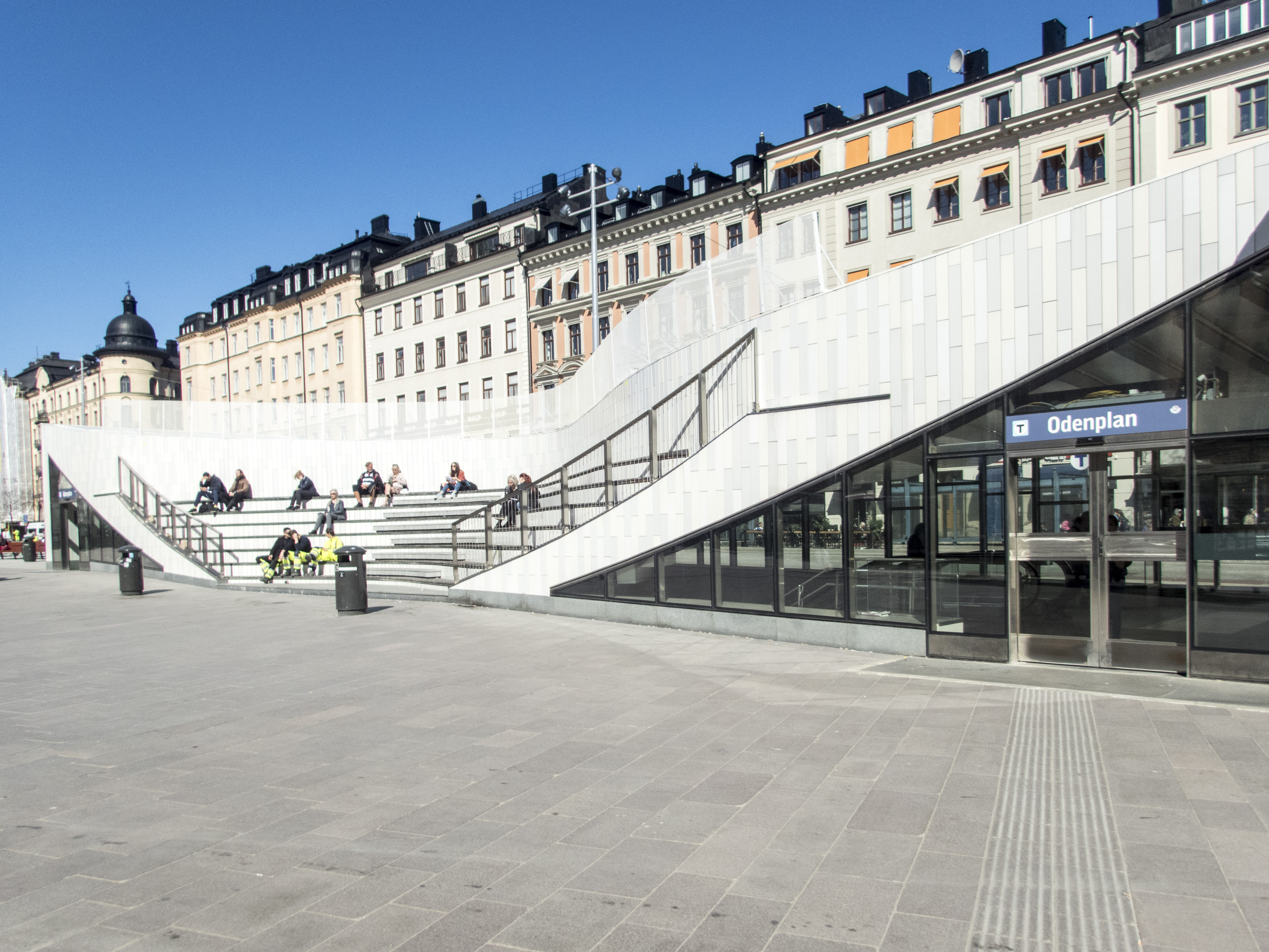
Odenplan commuter train station, 2017

Odenplan is a plaza located in the district Vasastaden in central Stockholm, Sweden.

== History ==
Odenplan was named after the old Norse god Odin. Odenplan metro station, opened in 1952, and Stockholm Odenplan commuter train station on the Stockholm commuter rail, opened in 2017, are located here.

Odenplan was portrayed in the 1976 thriller film The Man on the Roof, in which a helicopter crashes in the plaza. It also appears in the opening credits to the 1999 film Vuxna människor.

Stockholm Public Library and Gustaf Vasa Church (Gustaf Vasa kyrka) are located nearby.
