= Stockholm City railway station =

Train station serving Stockholm, Sweden

Coordinates: 59°19′52″N 18°03′34″E

Stockholm City
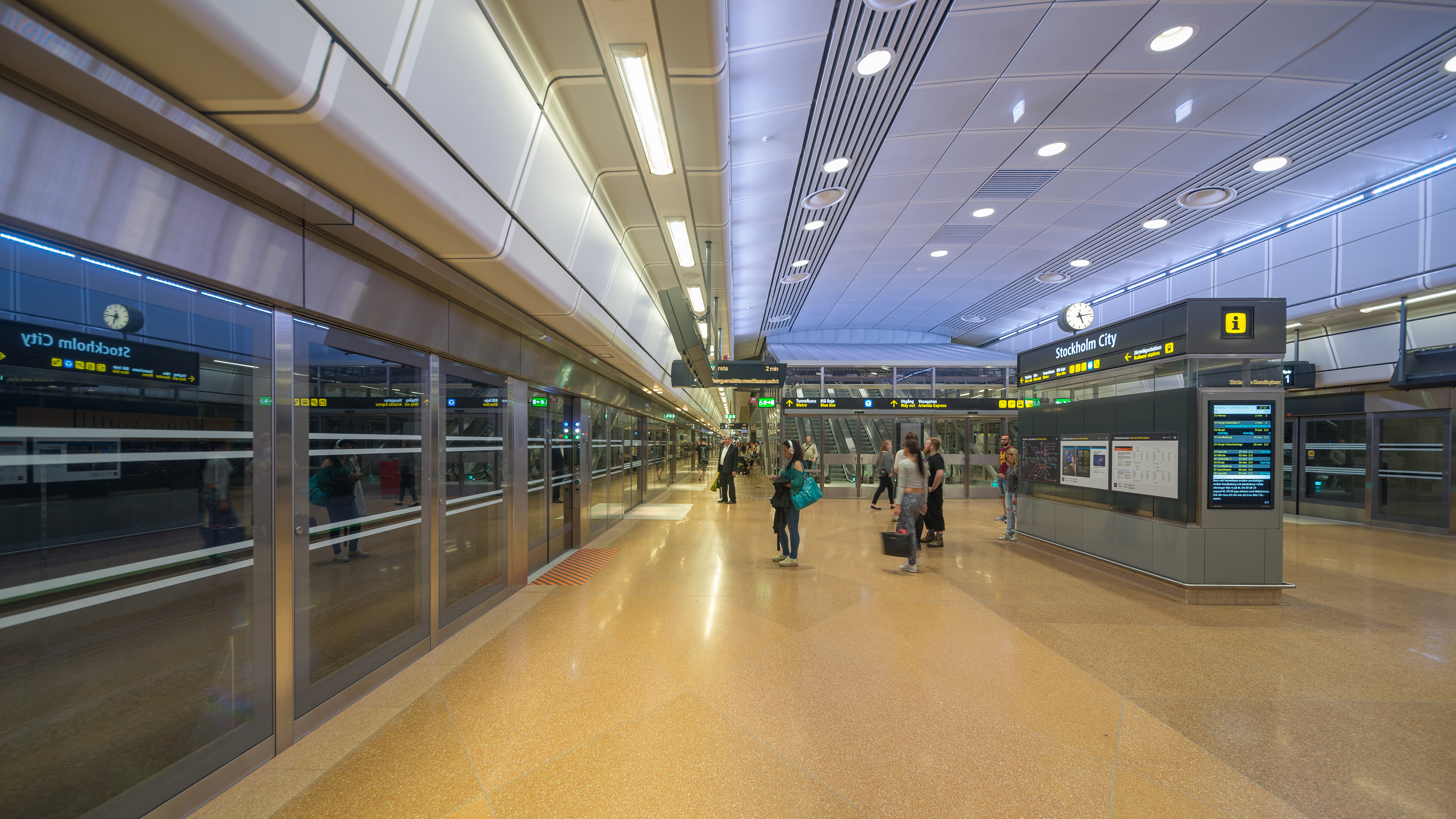
- Platform level

General information
- Location: Stockholm, Sweden
- Line: Citybanan
- Platforms: 2
- Tracks: 4
- Connections: Metro: All lines (T-Centralen metro station); Spårväg City Tram line 7 (T-Centralen metro station)

Construction
- Structure type: Underground

Other information
- Station code: Sci

History
- Opened: 10 July 2017

Passengers
- 2019: 65,400 boarding per weekday

Services
Preceding station	Stockholm commuter rail	Following station
Stockholm Odenplan towards Uppsala C	40	Stockholms södra towards Södertälje centrum
Stockholm Odenplan towards Märsta	41	Stockholms södra towards Södertälje centrum
Stockholm Odenplan towards Märsta	42X	Stockholms södra towards Nynäshamn
Stockholm Odenplan towards Bålsta	43	Stockholms södra towards Nynäshamn
Stockholm Odenplan towards Kallhäll	43X	Stockholms södra towards Nynäshamn
Stockholm Odenplan towards Bro	44	Stockholms södra towards Tumba
Location

Stockholm City is a railway station in central Stockholm, Sweden. Opened on 10 July 2017, the station is located on the Stockholm City Line. It is located directly below T-Centralen metro station (the hub of the Stockholm Metro) and is connected to Stockholm Central Station. The station serves all Stockholm commuter rail routes except for Line 48. It is the busiest mainline railway station in Sweden.

== Facilities ==
The station is located directly below T-Centralen metro station, and allows quicker transfer between metro and commuter rail than the past solution, with the commuter trains stopping at the central station. The station has two entrances, which are shared with the metro station. One exit at Vasaplan is with access to the Arlanda Express, and the other at Centralplan beside Scandic Continental. The station is located between 35 and 40 metres (115 and 131 ft) below ground level. At ground level, the station has a glass facade to allow as much sunlight as possible to penetrate down to the track level. It includes accesses to the metro's Green Line platforms towards Hagsätra, Skarpnäck and Farsta, and the Red Line's platforms towards Mörby and Ropsten.

== History ==
Construction started in 2009 and was done by building access tunnels from the depot at the central station, Vattugaraget and Torsgatan. The tunneling and bedrock work was completed in 2013, after which the station itself with facilities was built. The station is named after City, the central business district in which it is located.

== Gallery ==
=== Access to the station ===
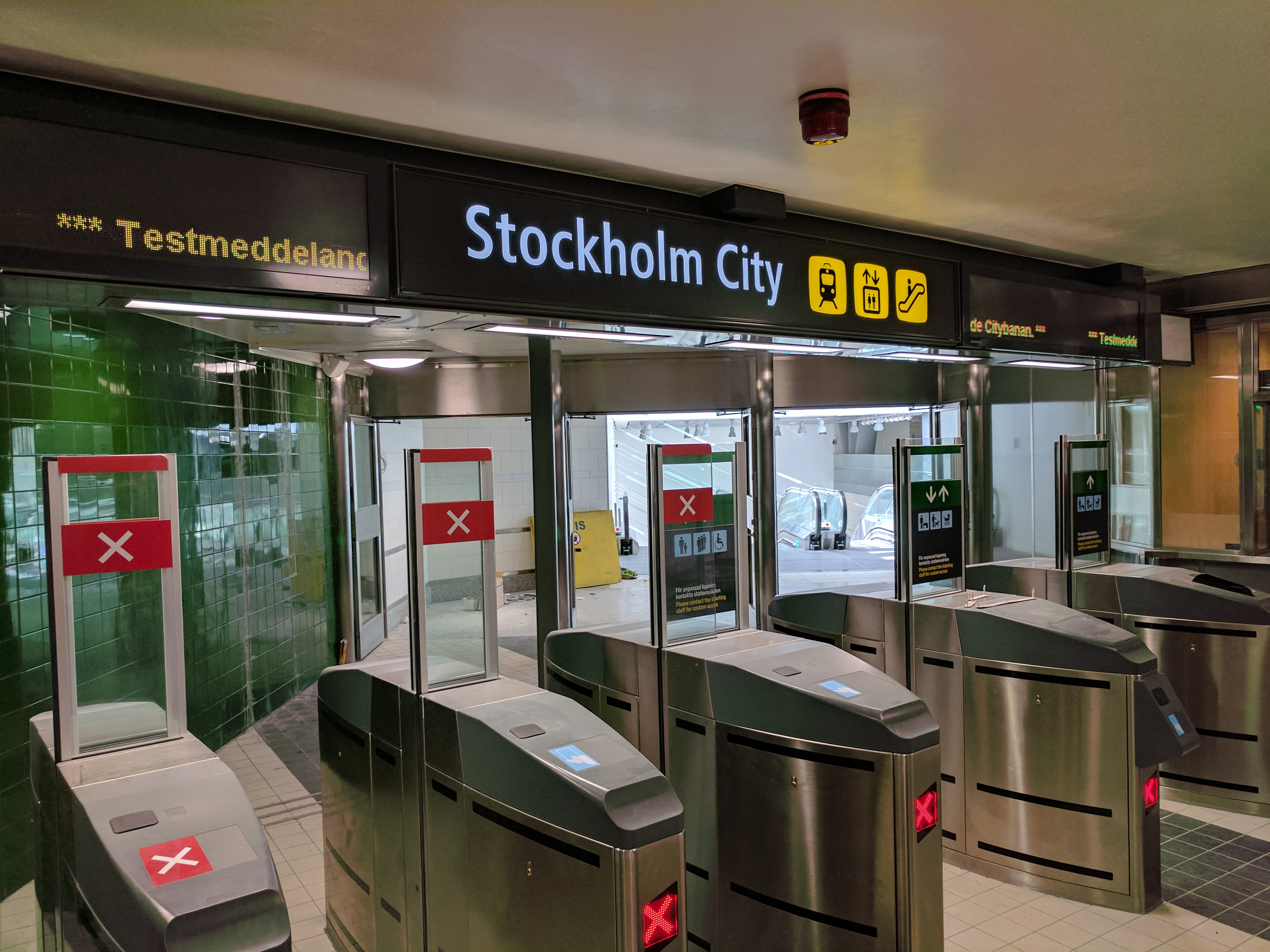

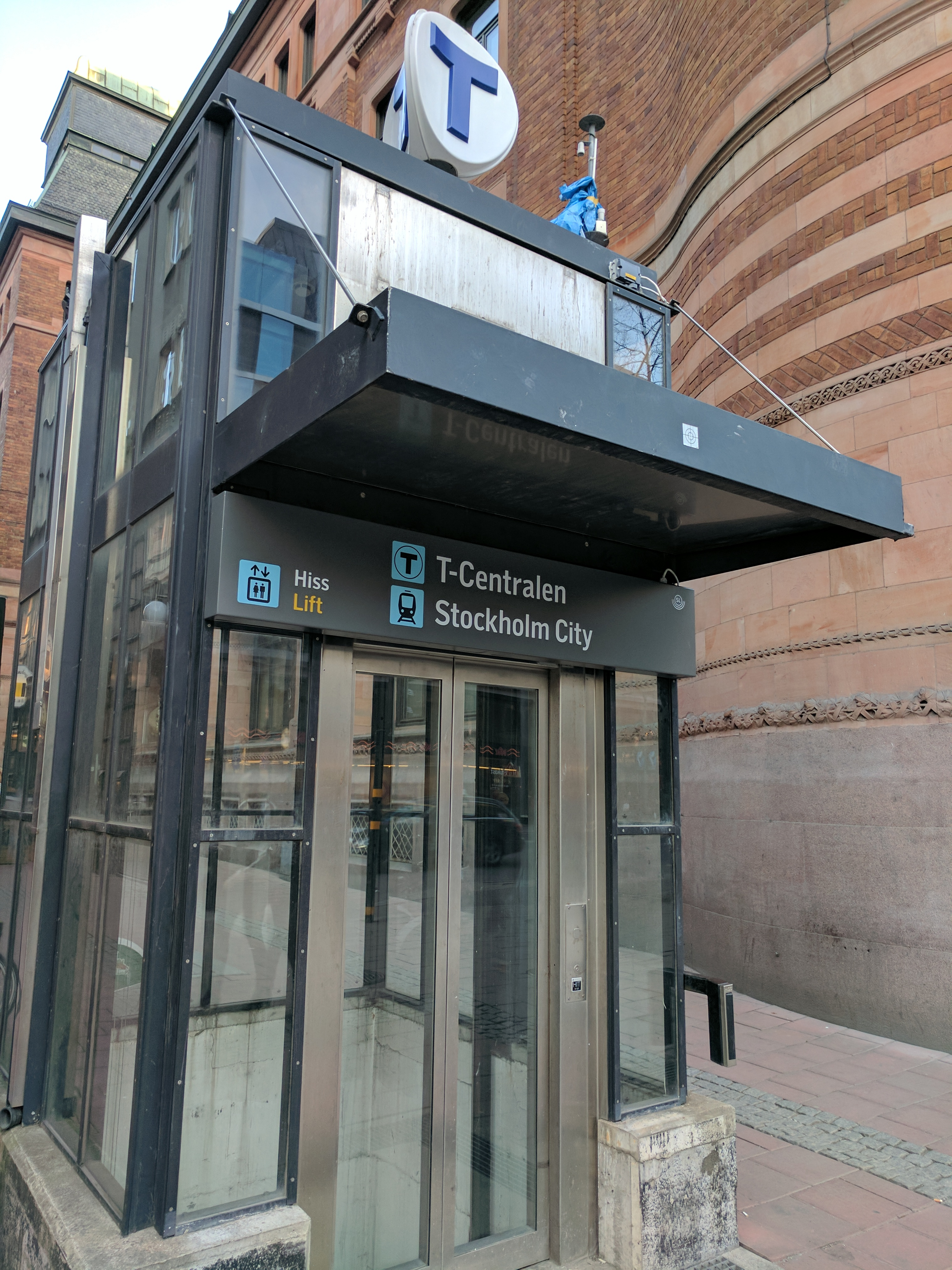

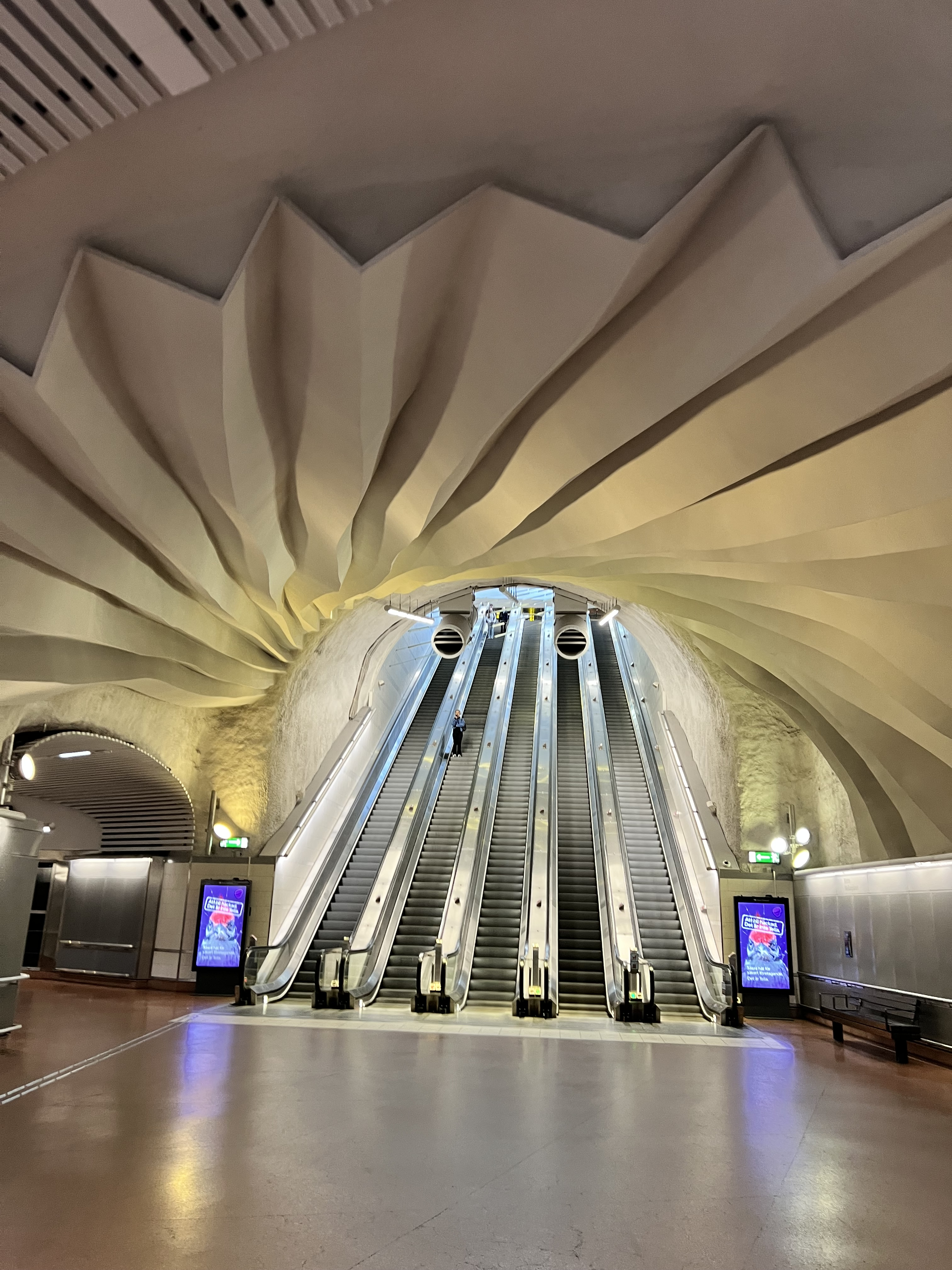

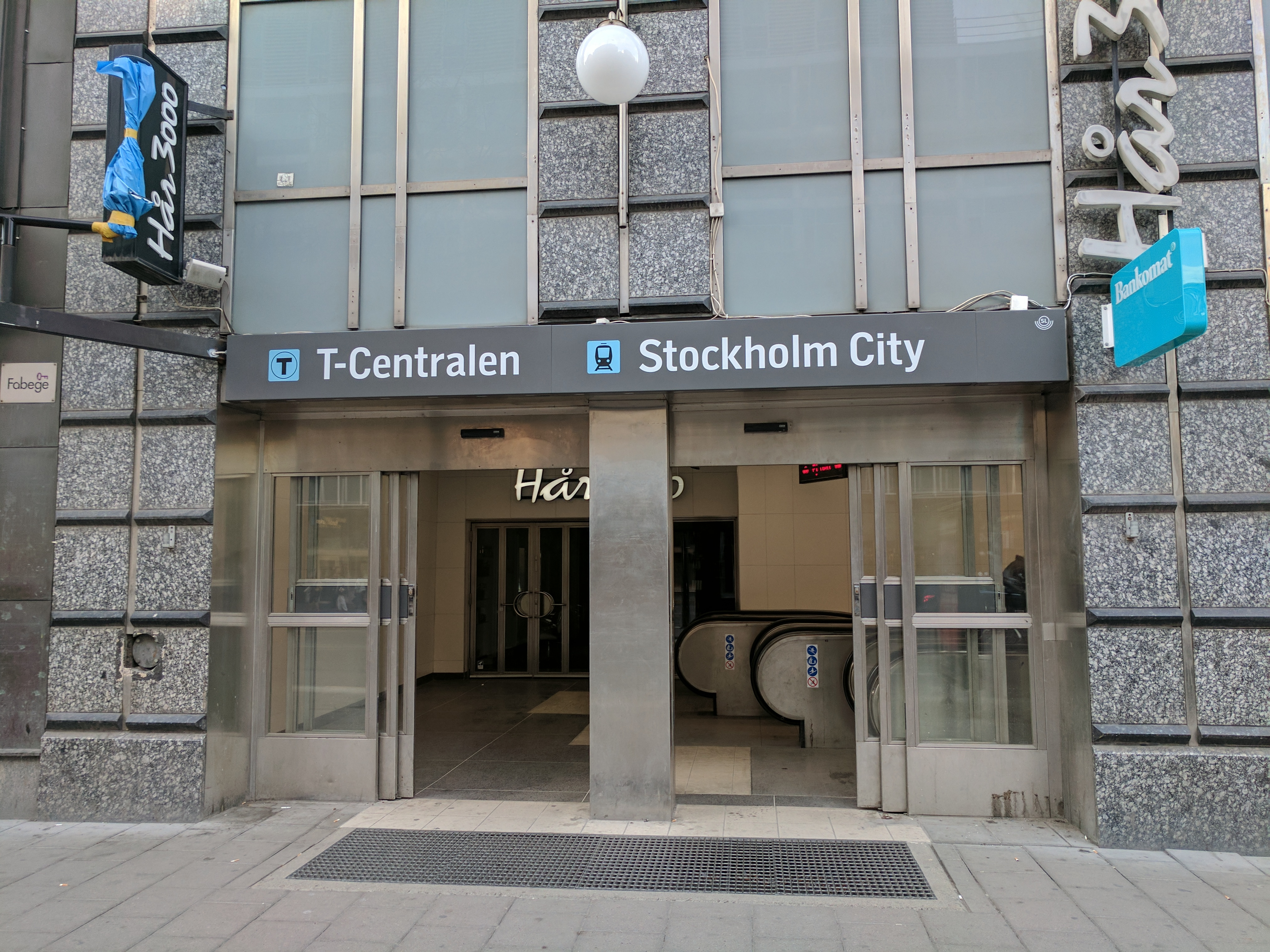

=== Concourse ===
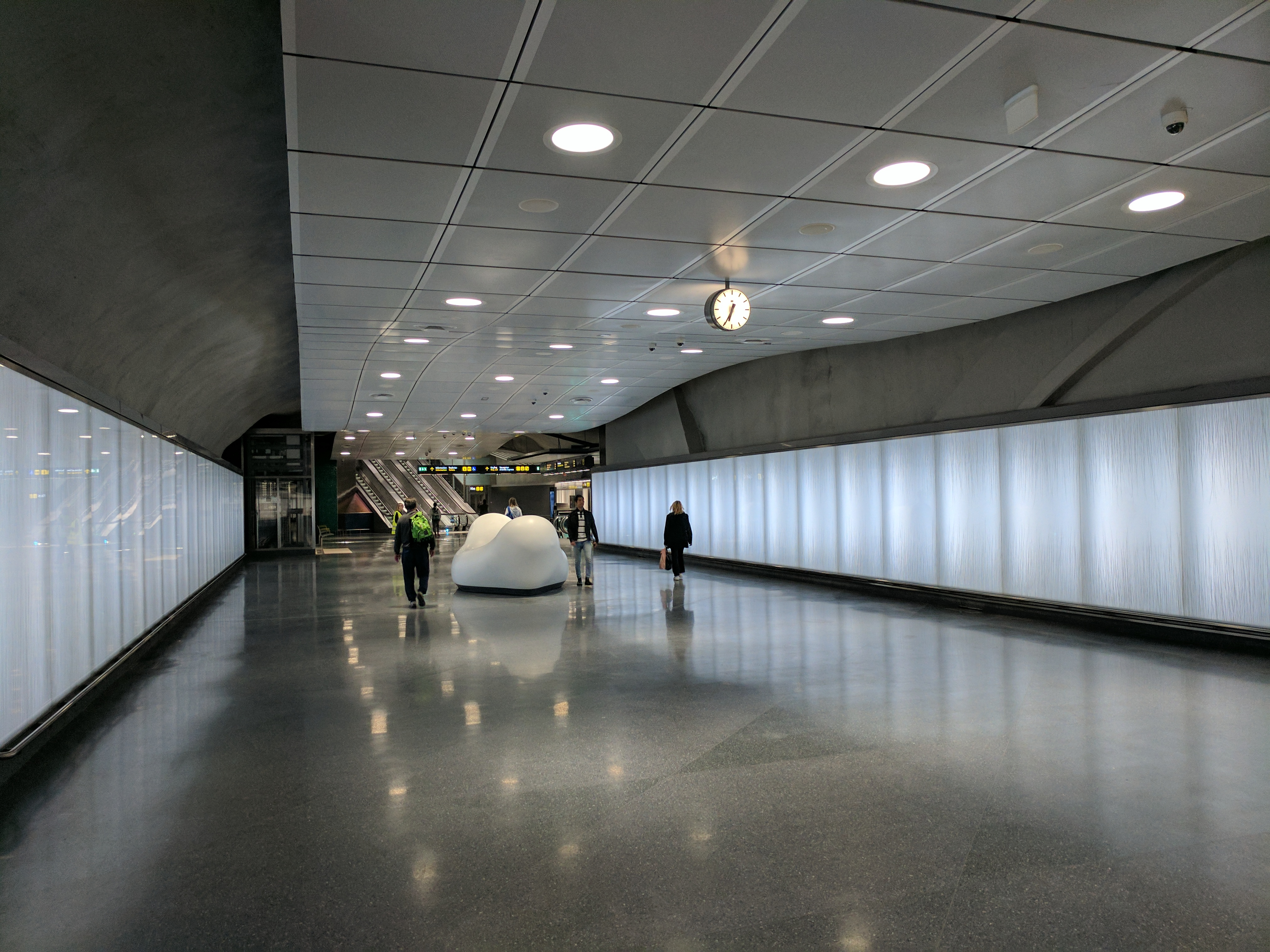

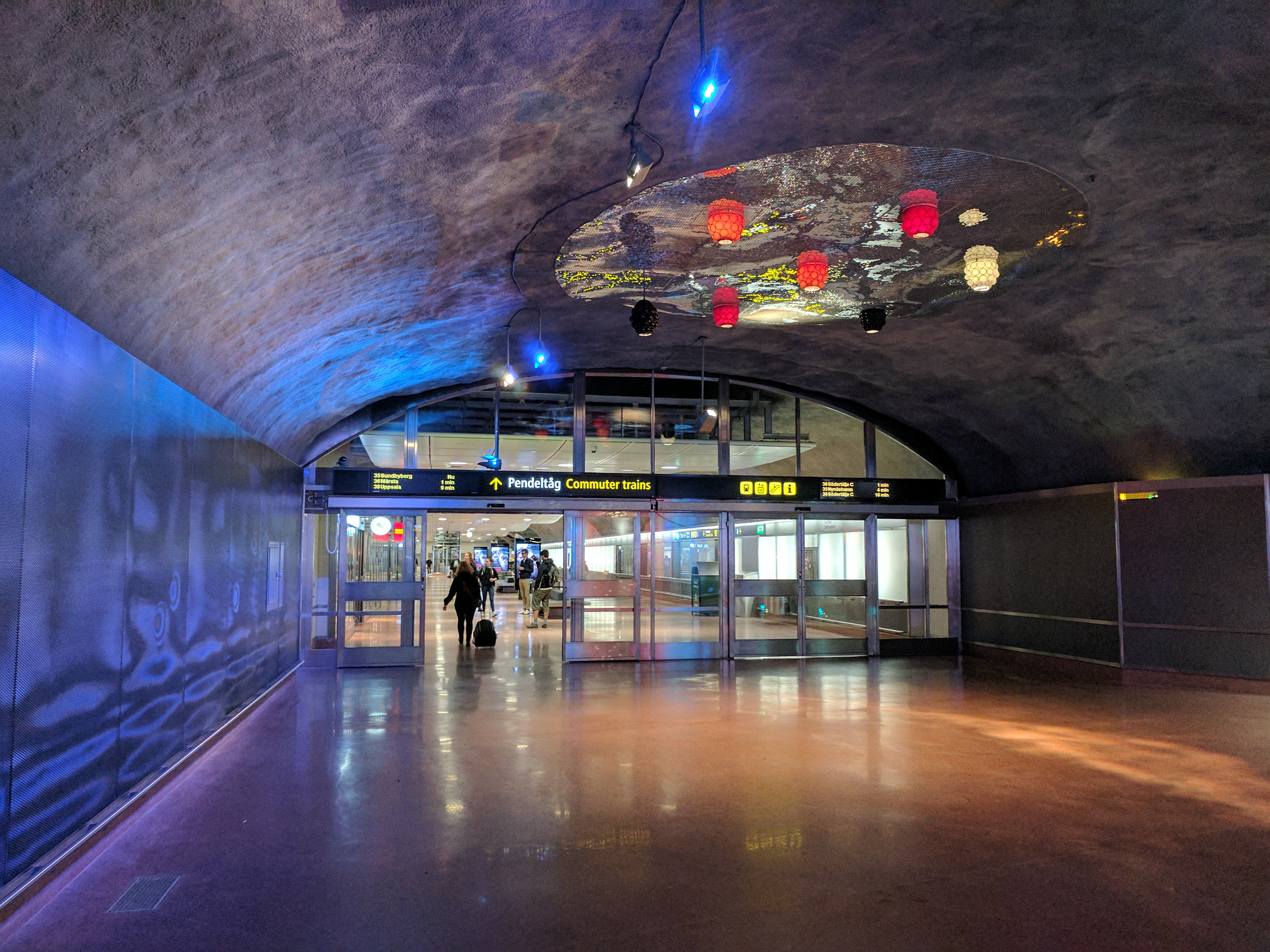

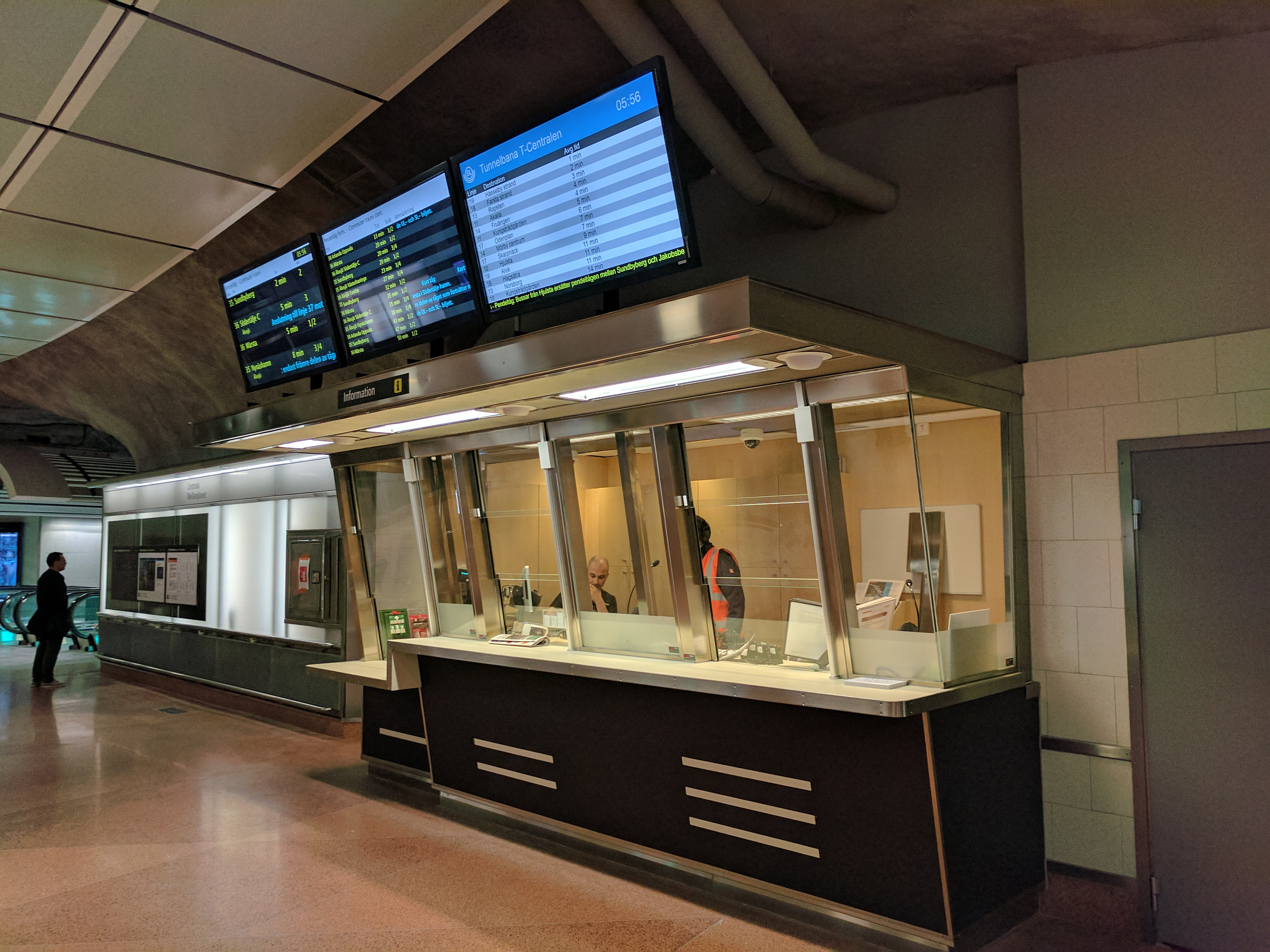

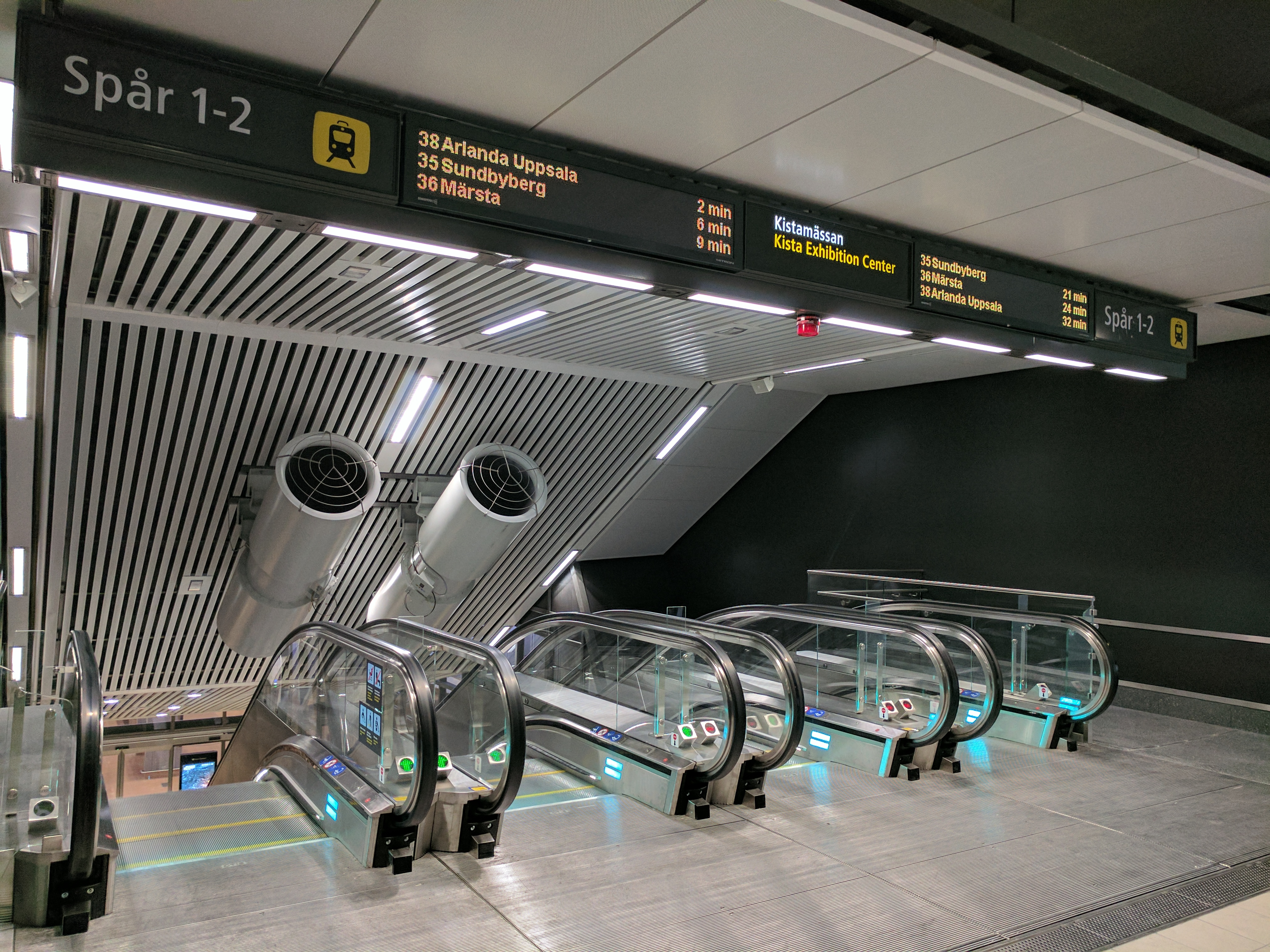

=== Platforms ===
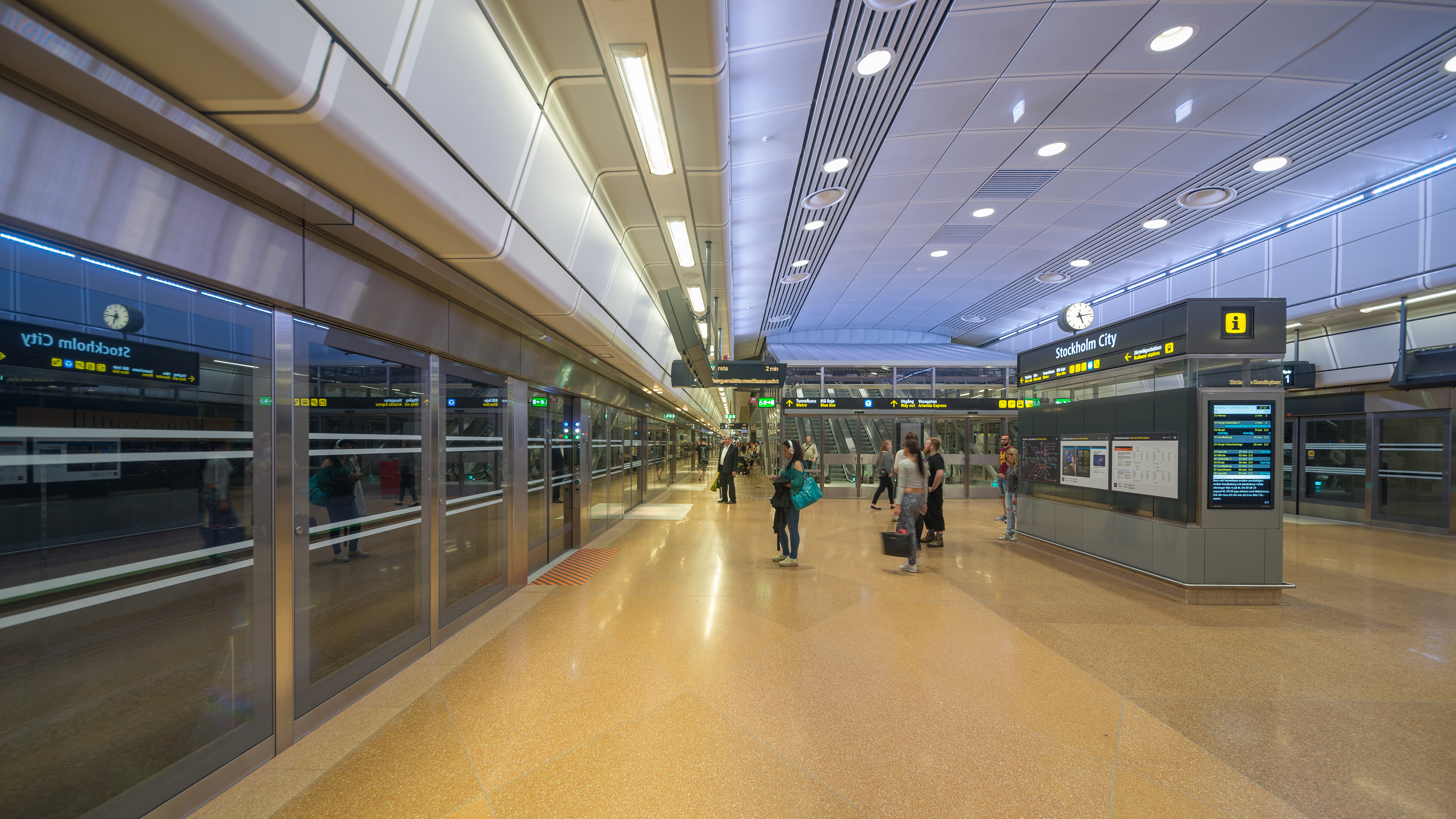

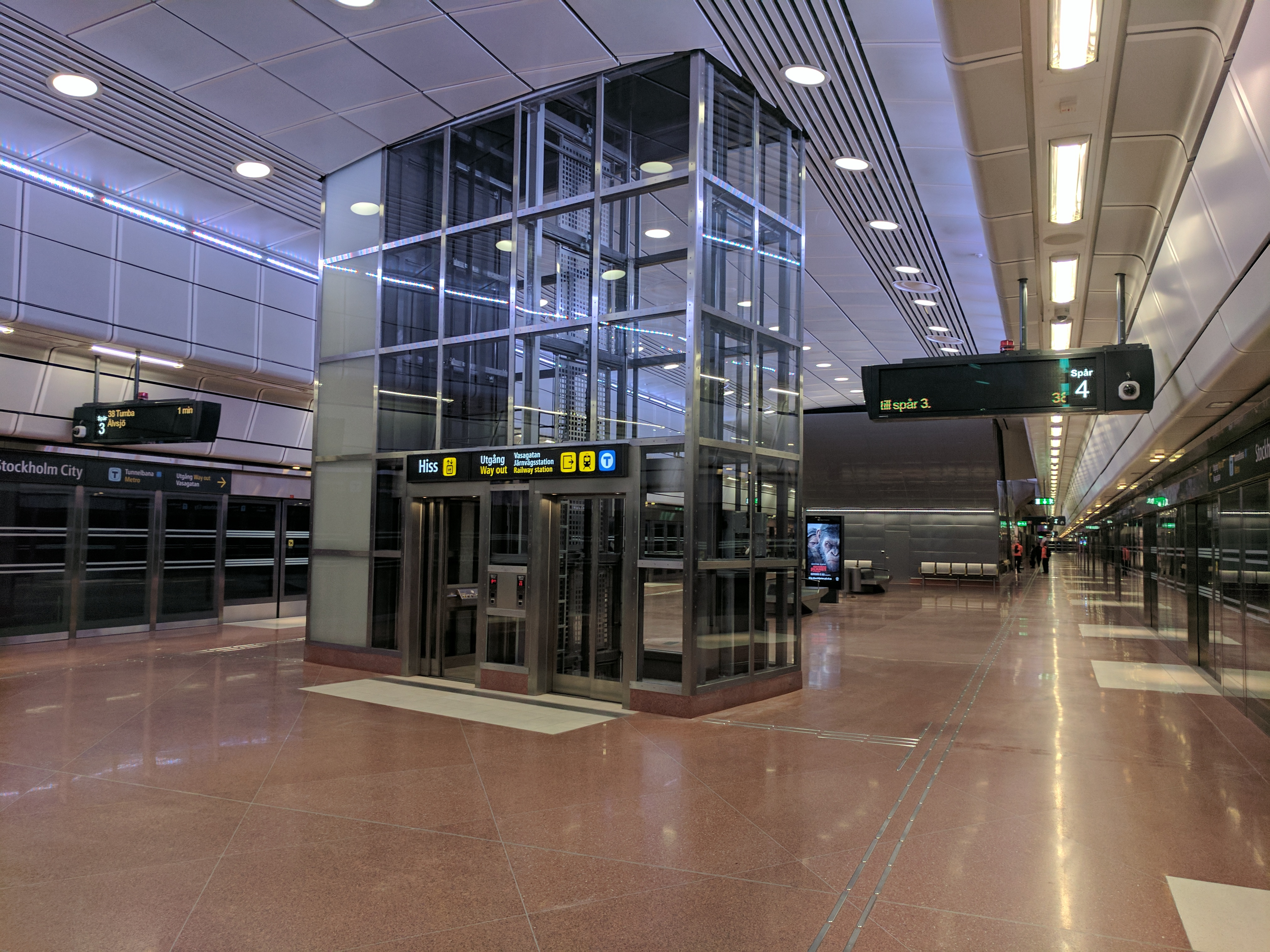

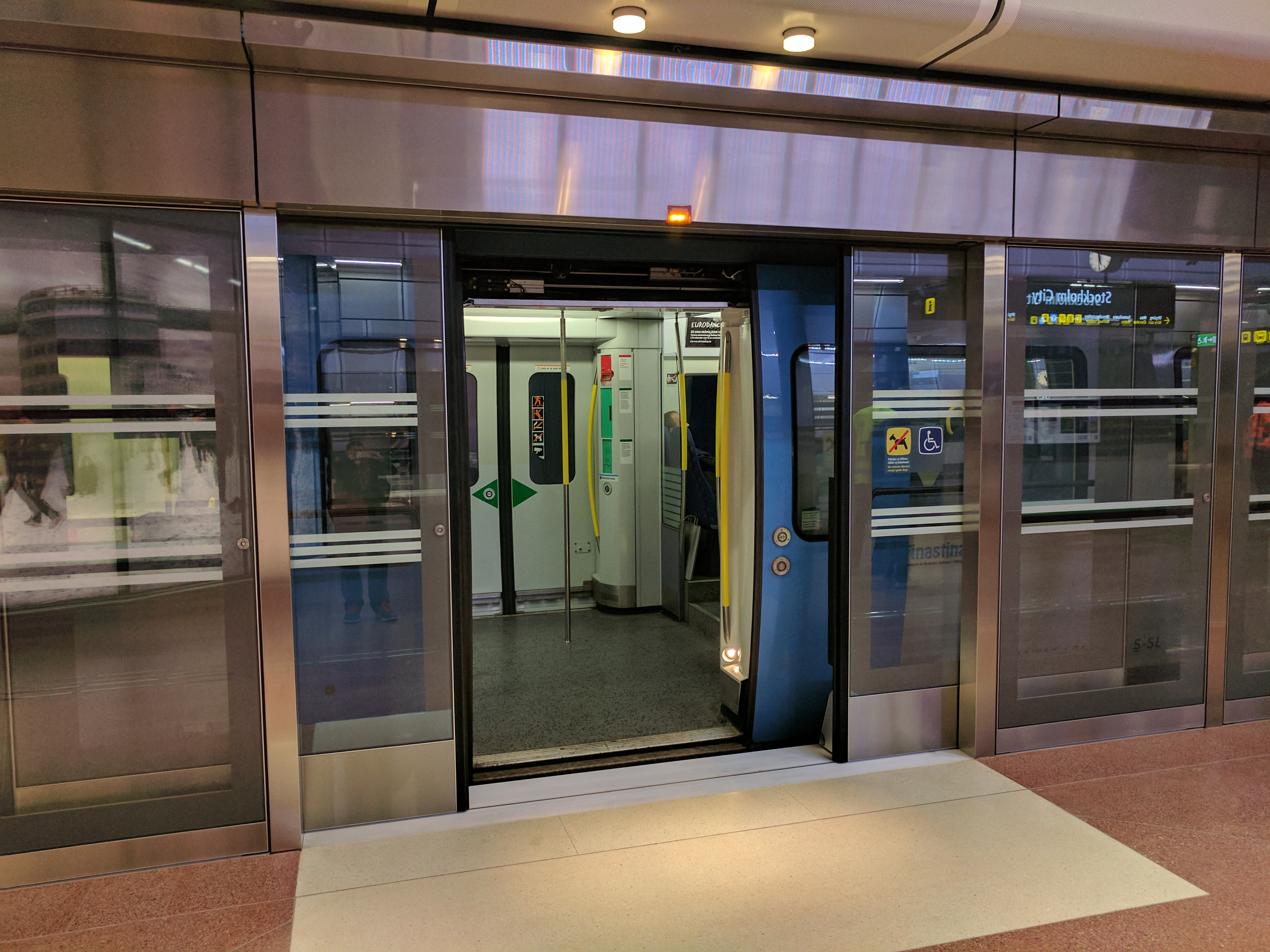

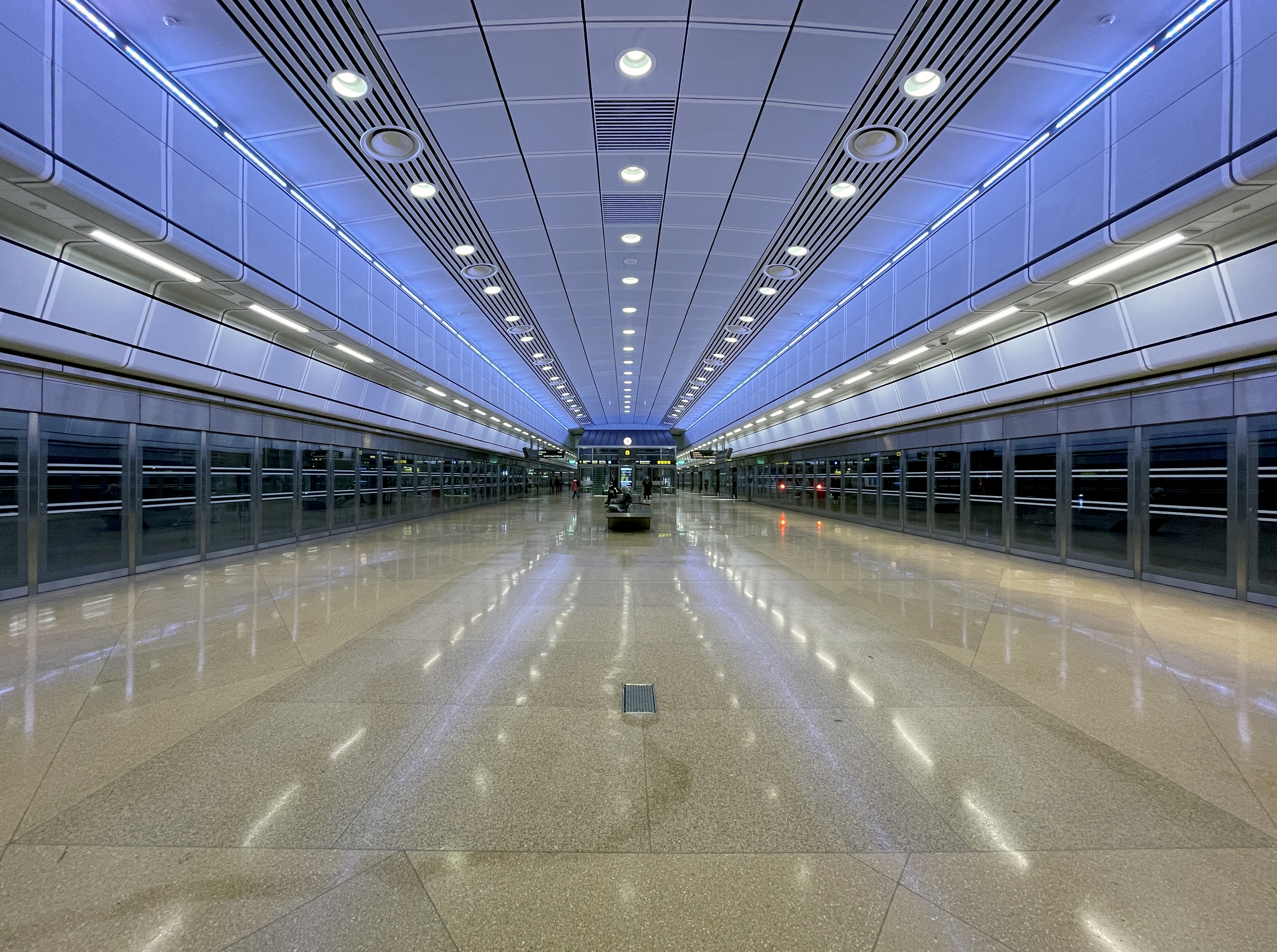

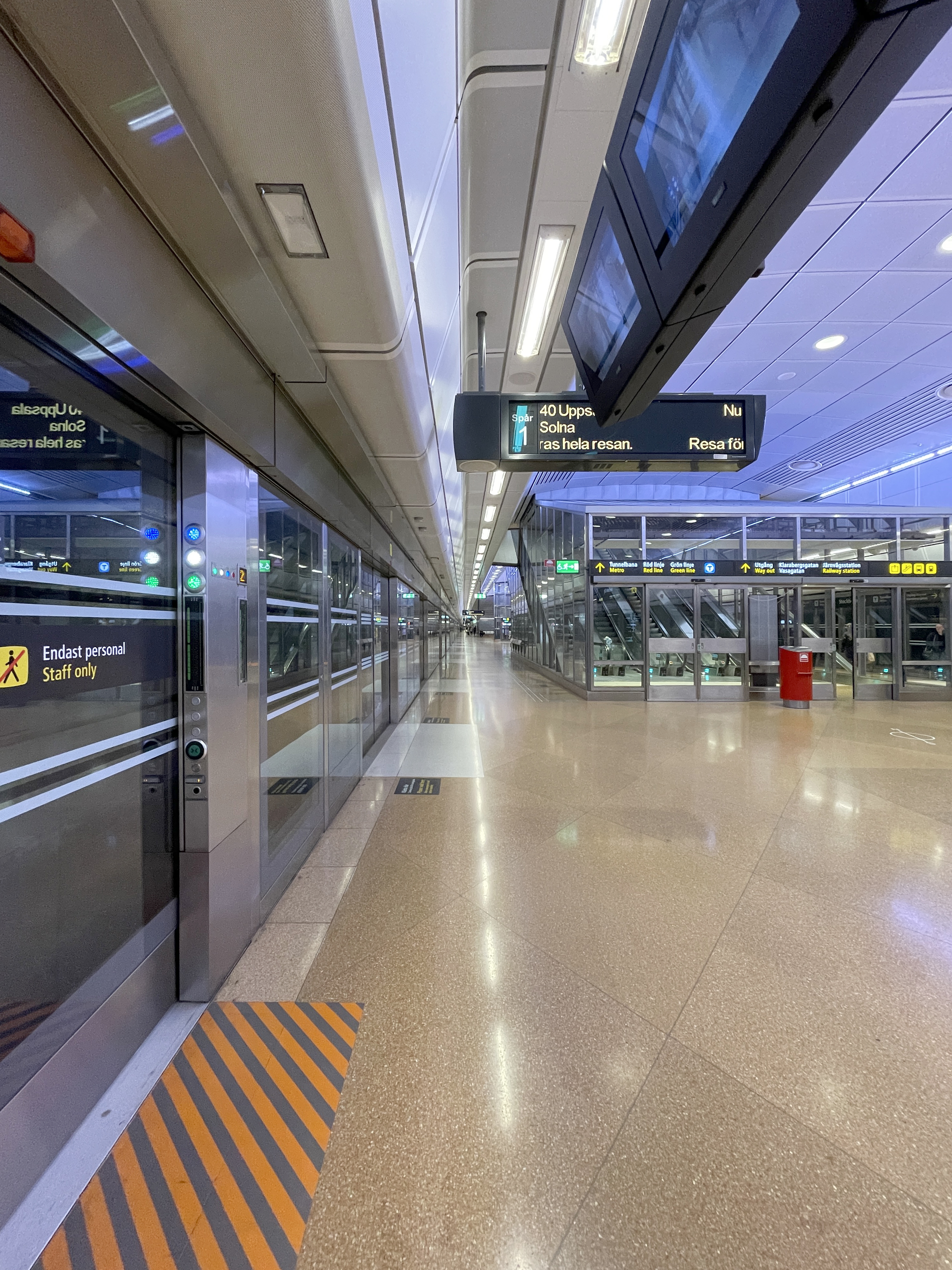

=== Construction ===
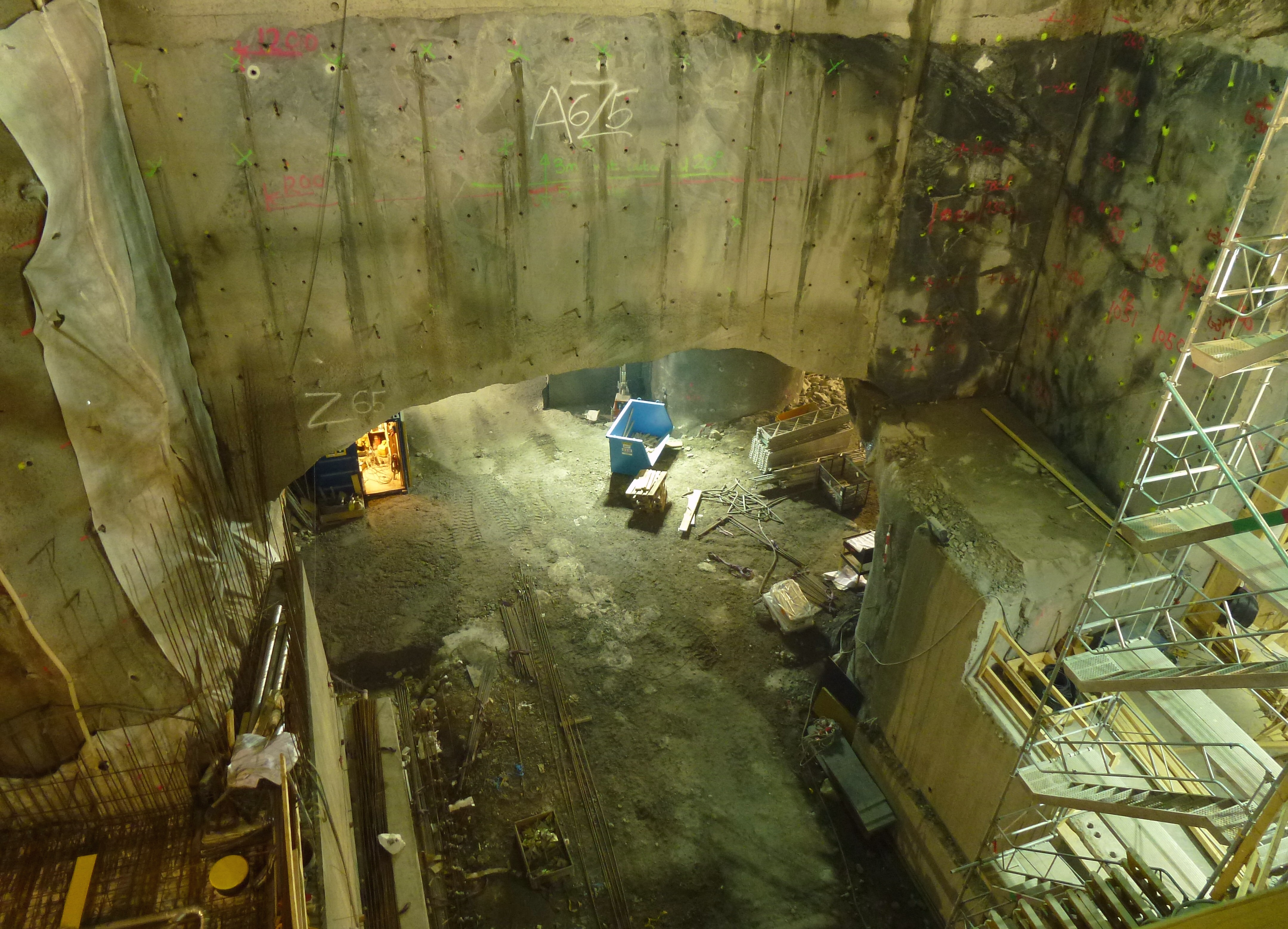

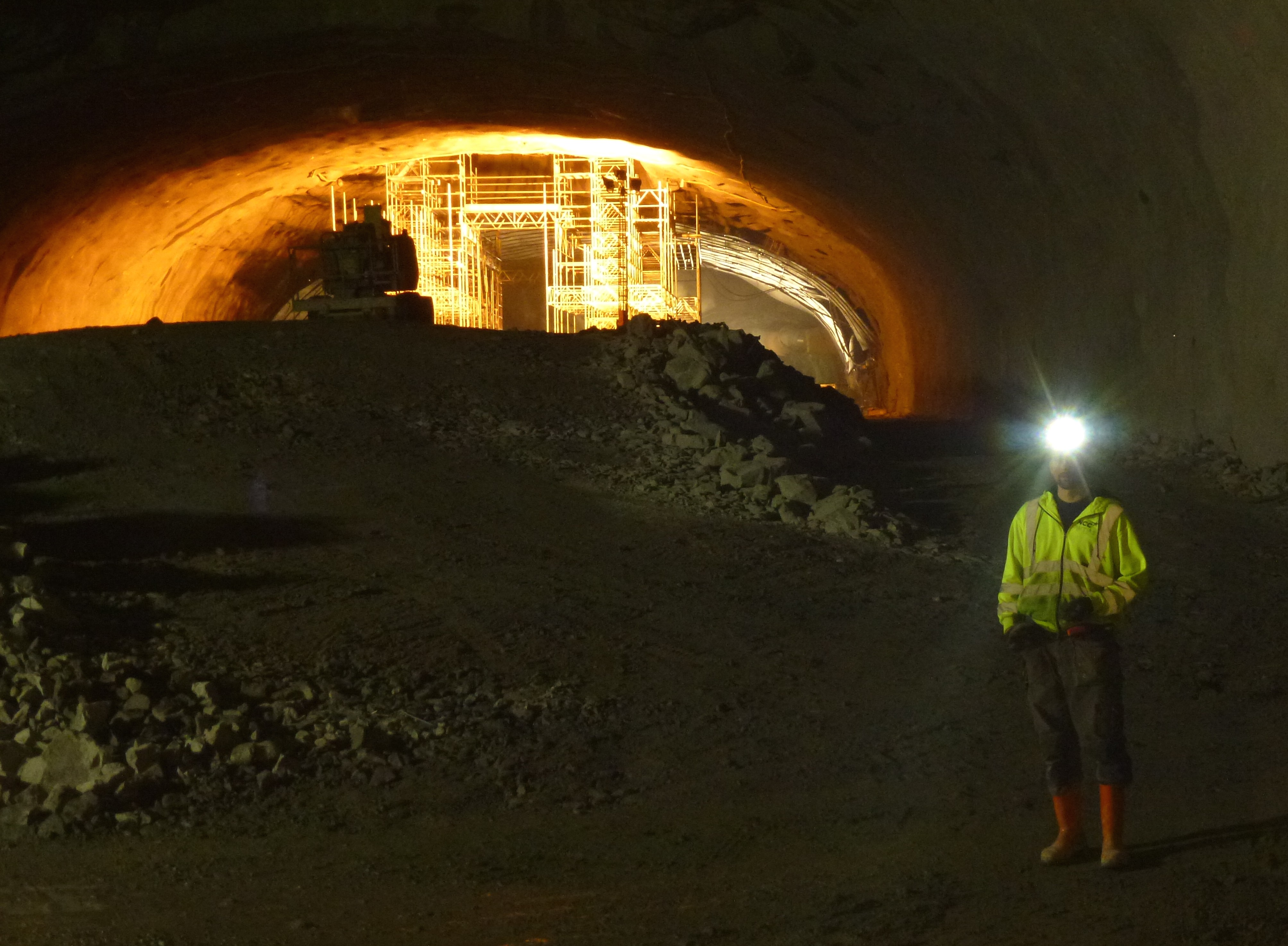

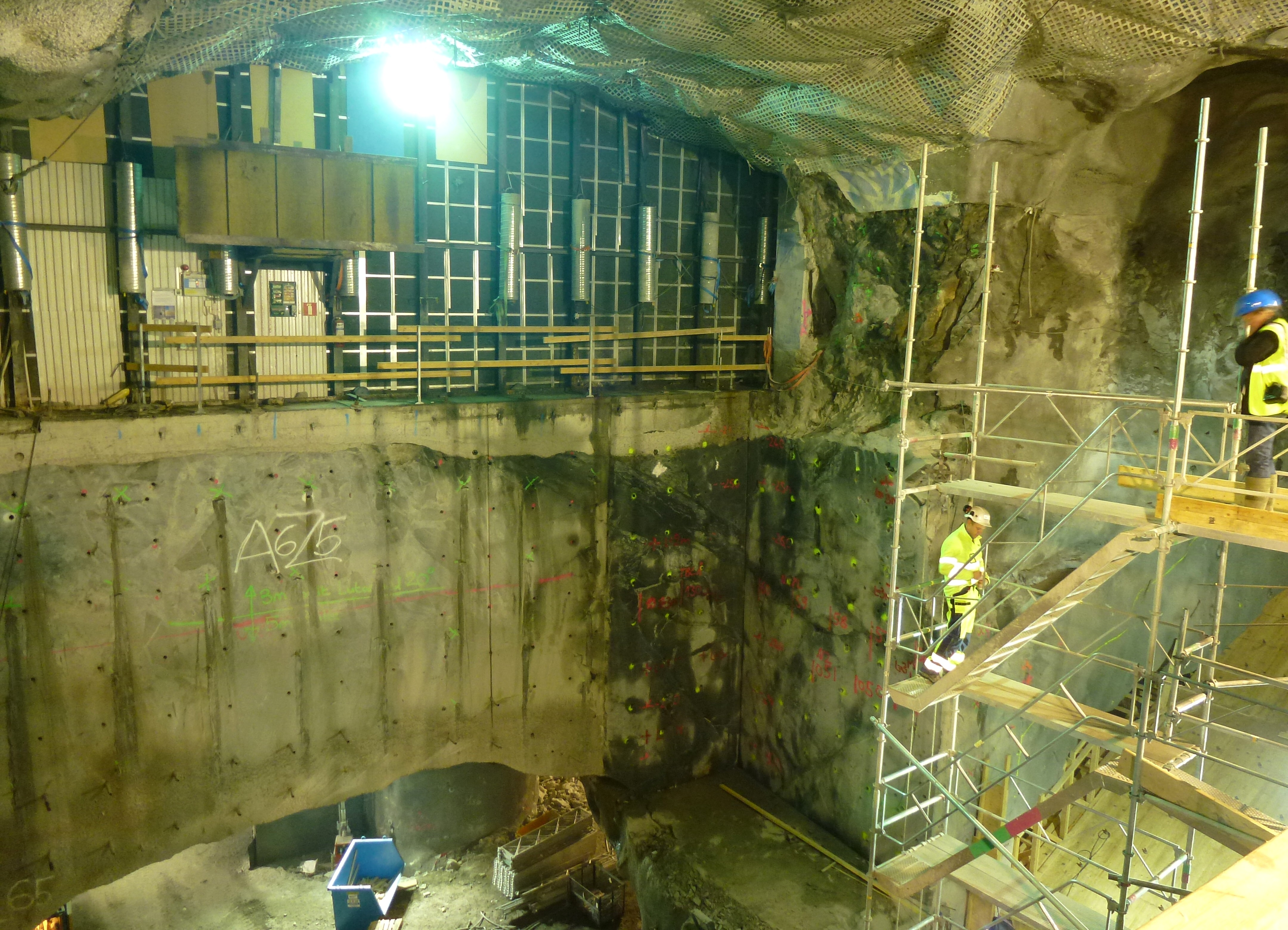

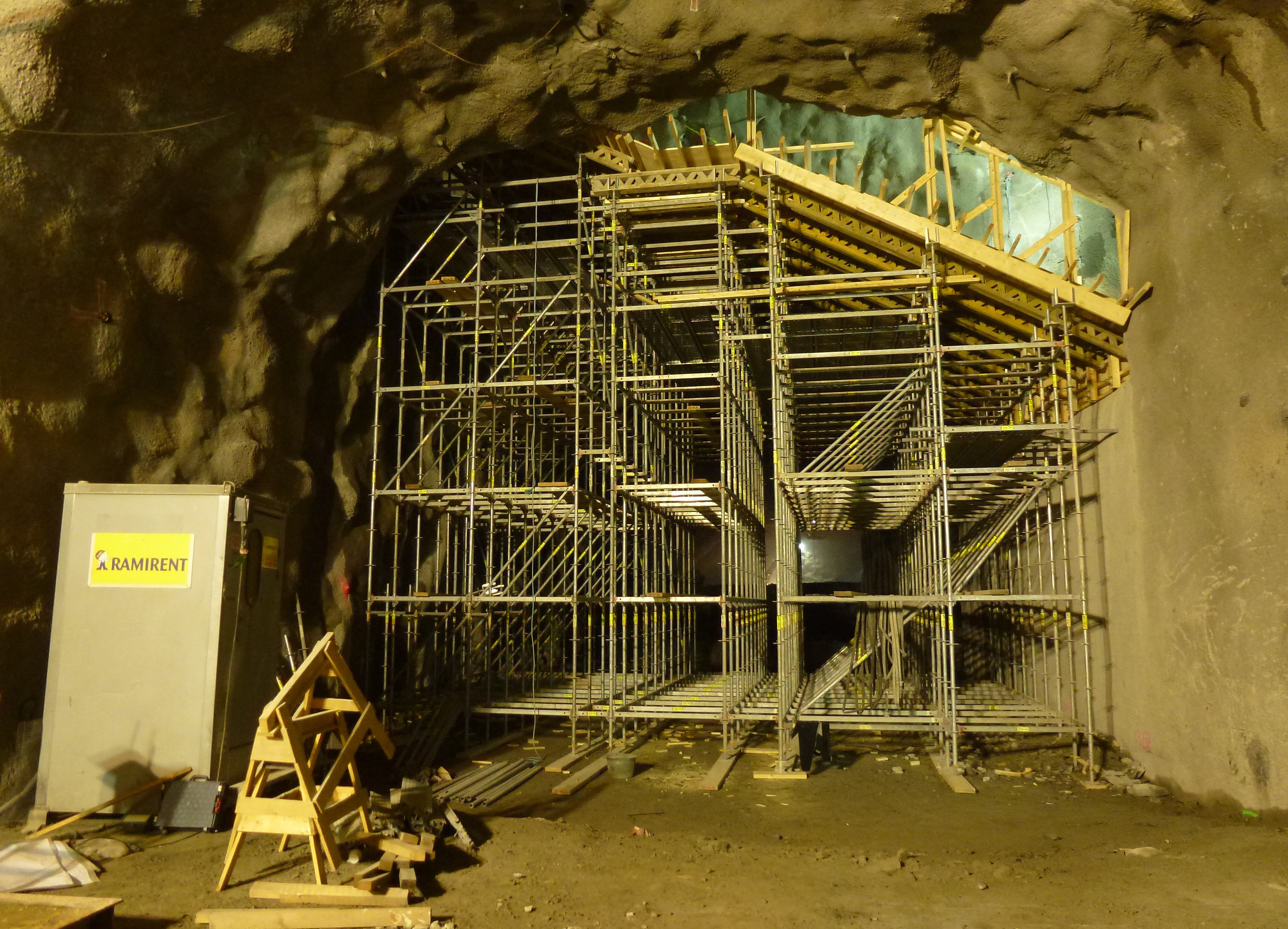
