= Odenplan station =

Railway stations at Odenplan in Stockholm, Sweden

Odenplan station may refer to either of two interconnected underground stations at Odenplan in Vasastan, Stockholm, Sweden:

- Odenplan metro station, a station on the Stockholm Metro's Green Line, opened in 1952
- Stockholm Odenplan station, a station on the Stockholm commuter rail network, located directly beneath the metro station and opened in 2017
