= Knivsta railway station =

Railway station in Knivsta Municipality, Sweden

Knivsta
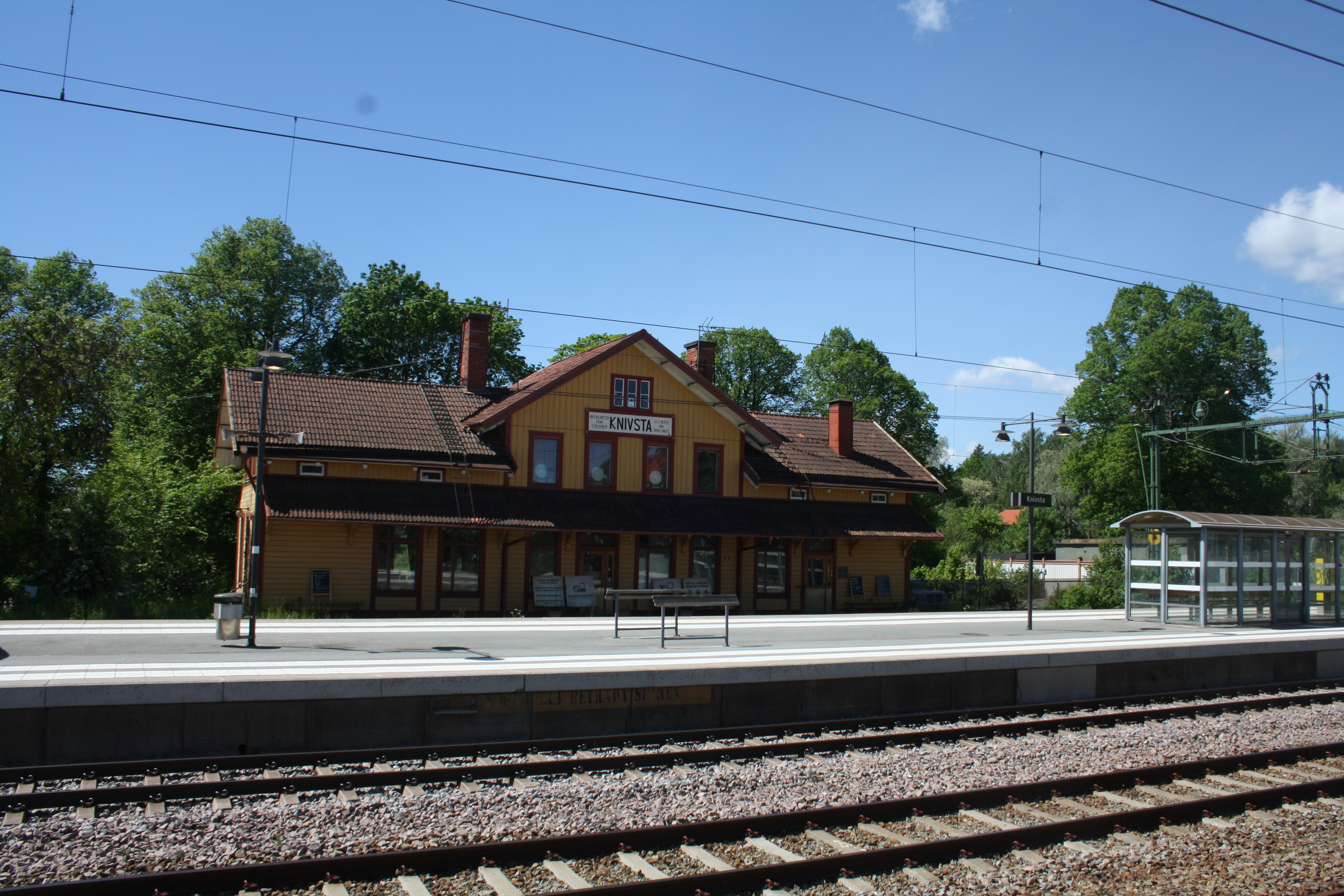
- Knivsta railway station, 2019

General information
- Location: Knivsta, Knivsta Municipality, Sweden; Sweden
- Coordinates: 59°43′48″N 17°47′48″E
- System: Pendeltåg, Mälartåg
- Owner: Trafikverket
- Operator: Storstockholms lokaltrafik
- Line: Ostkustbanan
- Platforms: 2
- Tracks: 3 (2 used for passenger traffic)

Construction
- Structure type: At-grade
- Accessible: yes

Other information
- Station code: Kn

History
- Opened: 1876
- Rebuilt: 1929

Services
Preceding station	Stockholm commuter rail	Following station
Uppsala C Terminus	40	Arlanda Central towards Södertälje Centrum
Location

Knivsta is a railway station in Knivsta Municipality, Uppsala County, Sweden. It is served by Mälartåg and the Stockholm commuter rail. Until December 2012, it was also served by Upptåget, but the extension of a Stockholm commuter rail line to Uppsala led to SL taking over local train services.

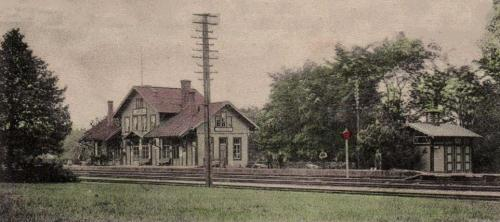
Knivsta railway station in 1901

In 1866, the Northern Main Line was built through Knivsta, and in 1876, the current station was established on land belonging to Särsta estate. The station building was designed in the then-popular Swiss chalet style by Adolf W. Edelsvärd. This architectural style was known as the Habomodellen, and similar station buildings were constructed in places such as Bodafors, Björneborg, Lammhult, and Tenhult. The station building was first modernized in 1929. Today, it is privately owned and no longer functions as a waiting area for passengers.

Knivsta is a major commuter town, and the station experiences high passenger demand. In discussions about upgrading the four-track railway connection between Myrbacken, just south of Knivsta, and northward toward Uppsala, various proposals have been put forward regarding the station building, including relocation or demolition. A small travel center was built adjacent to the railway station in 2013–2014.

== Gallery ==
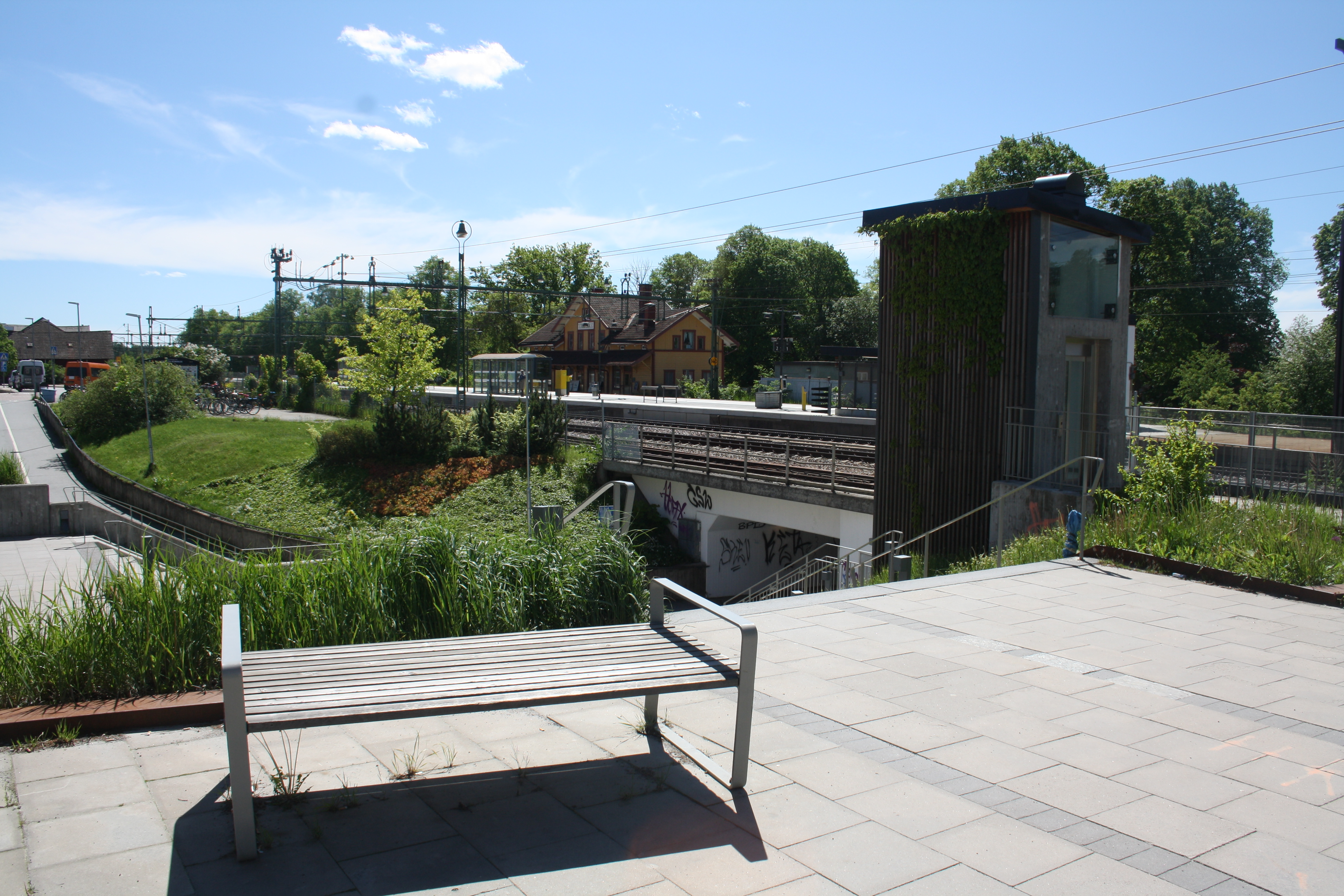
Station area

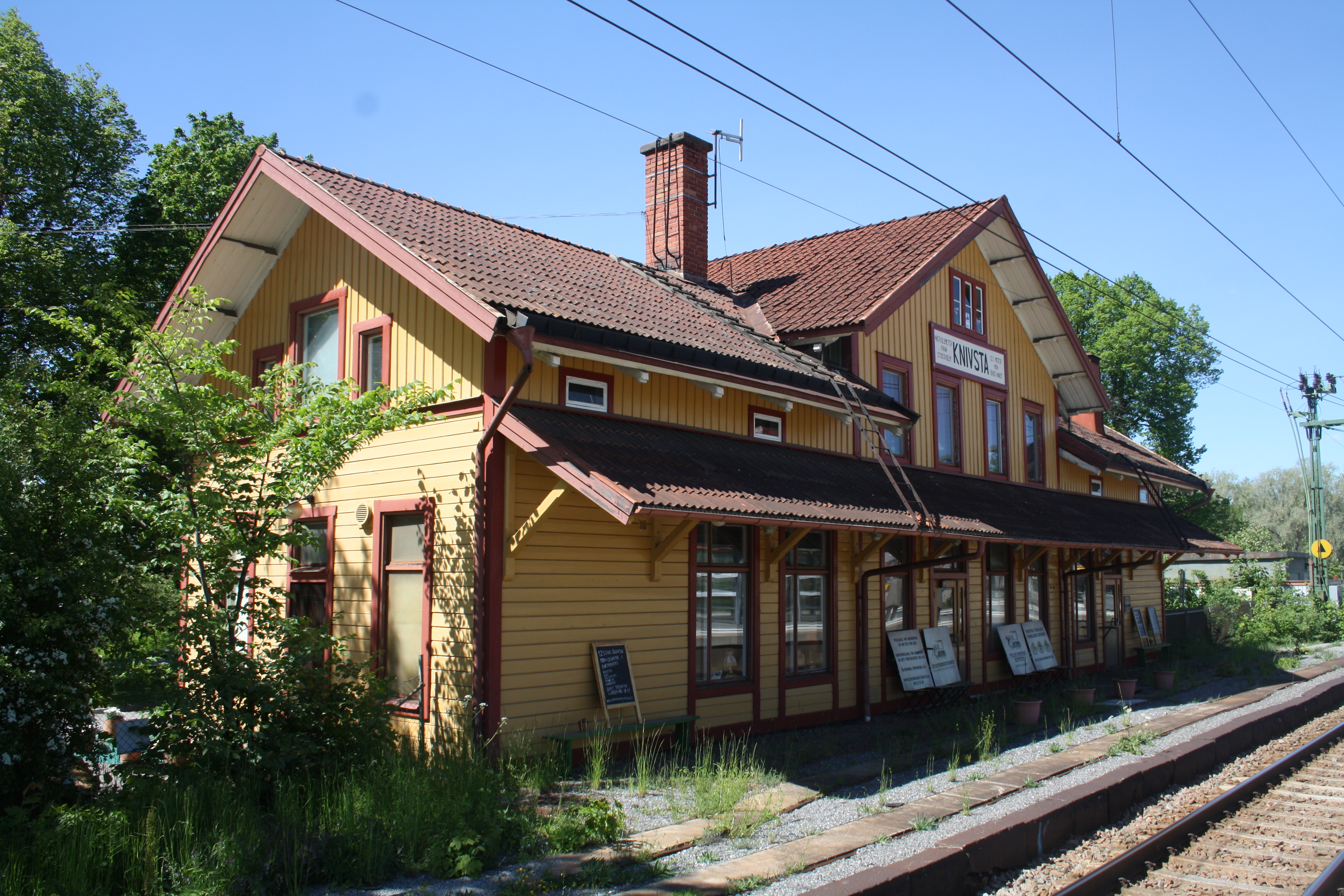
Station building

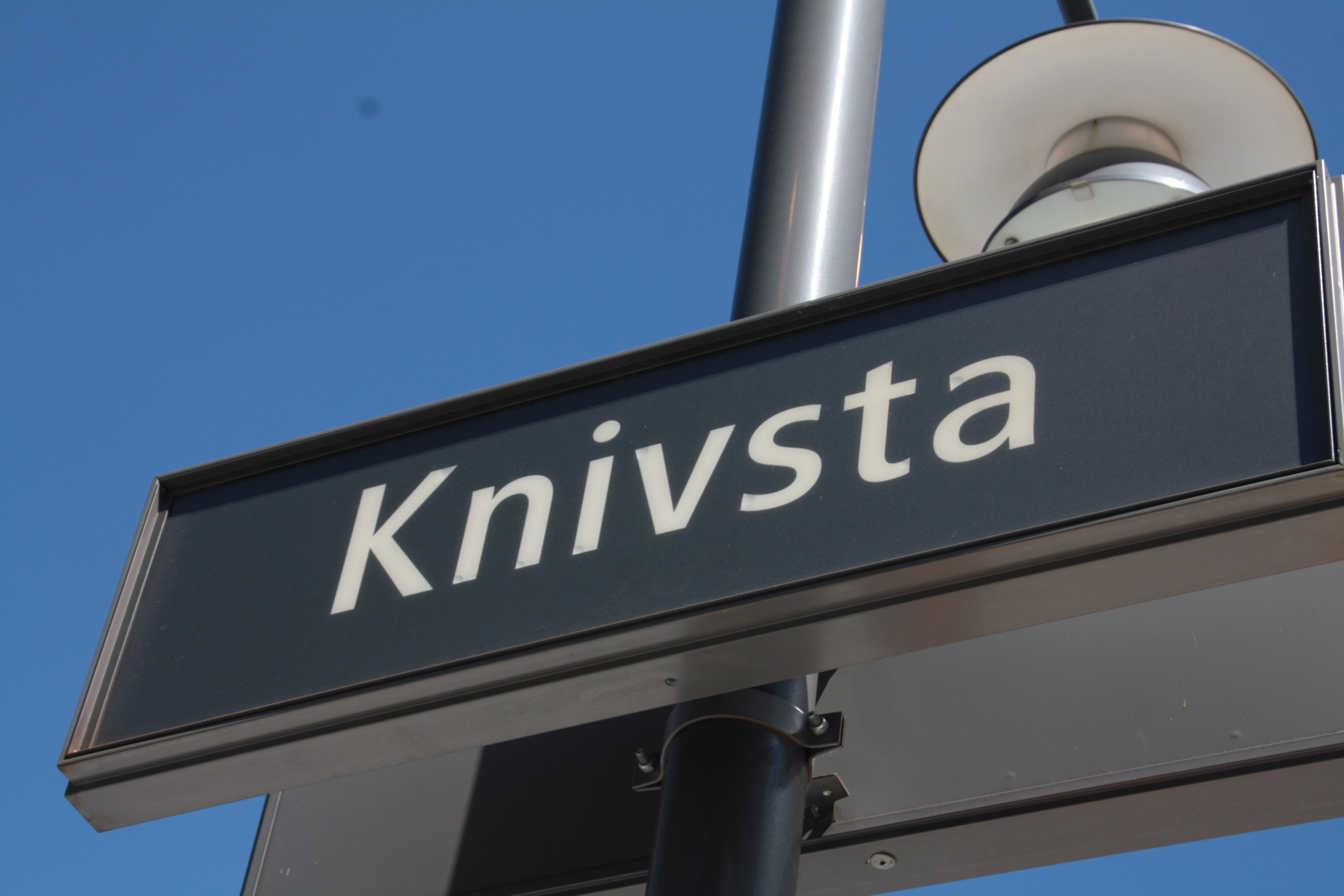
Station sign

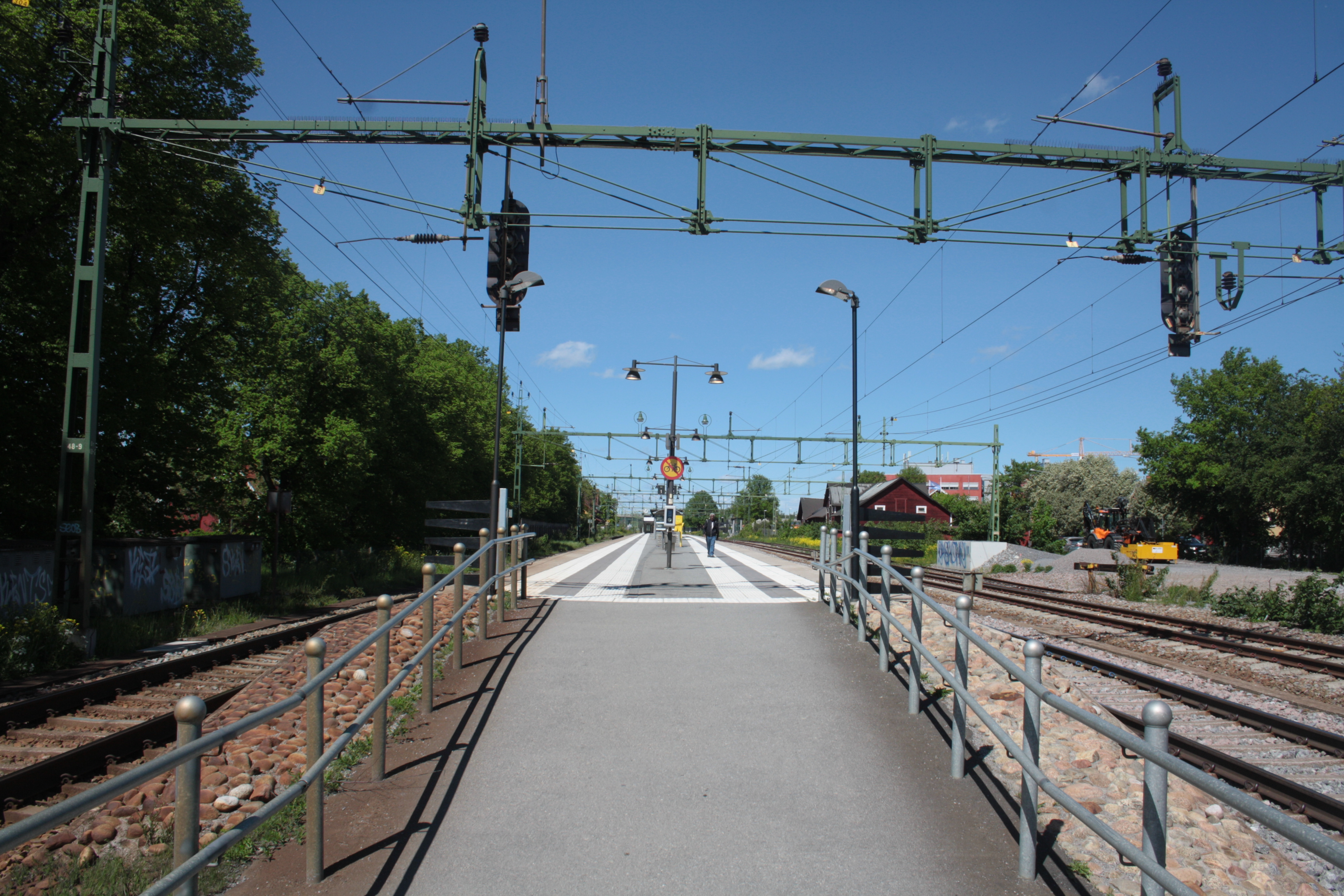
Platform

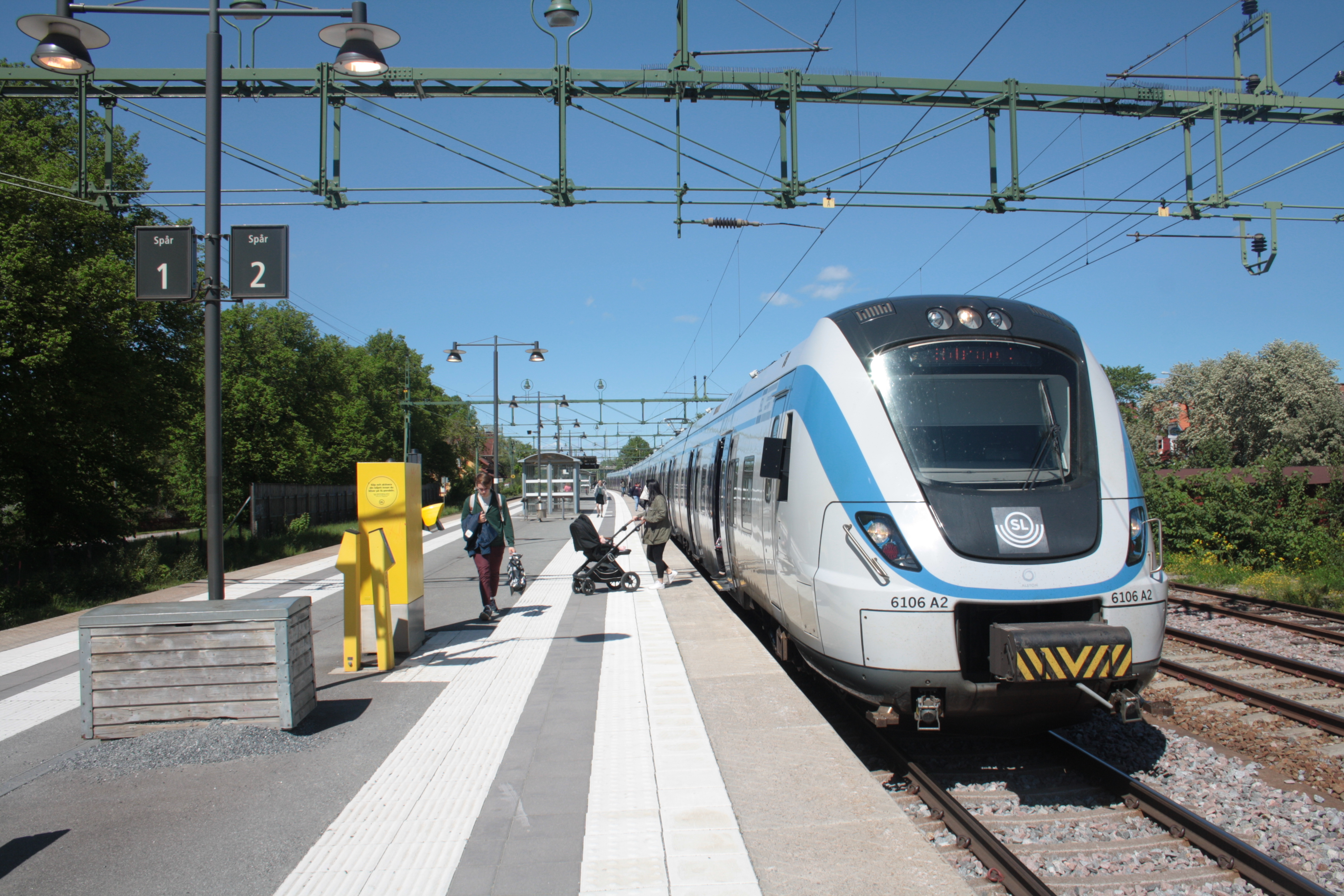
Platform
