= Arlanda Central Station =

Railway station in Sweden

Arlanda C
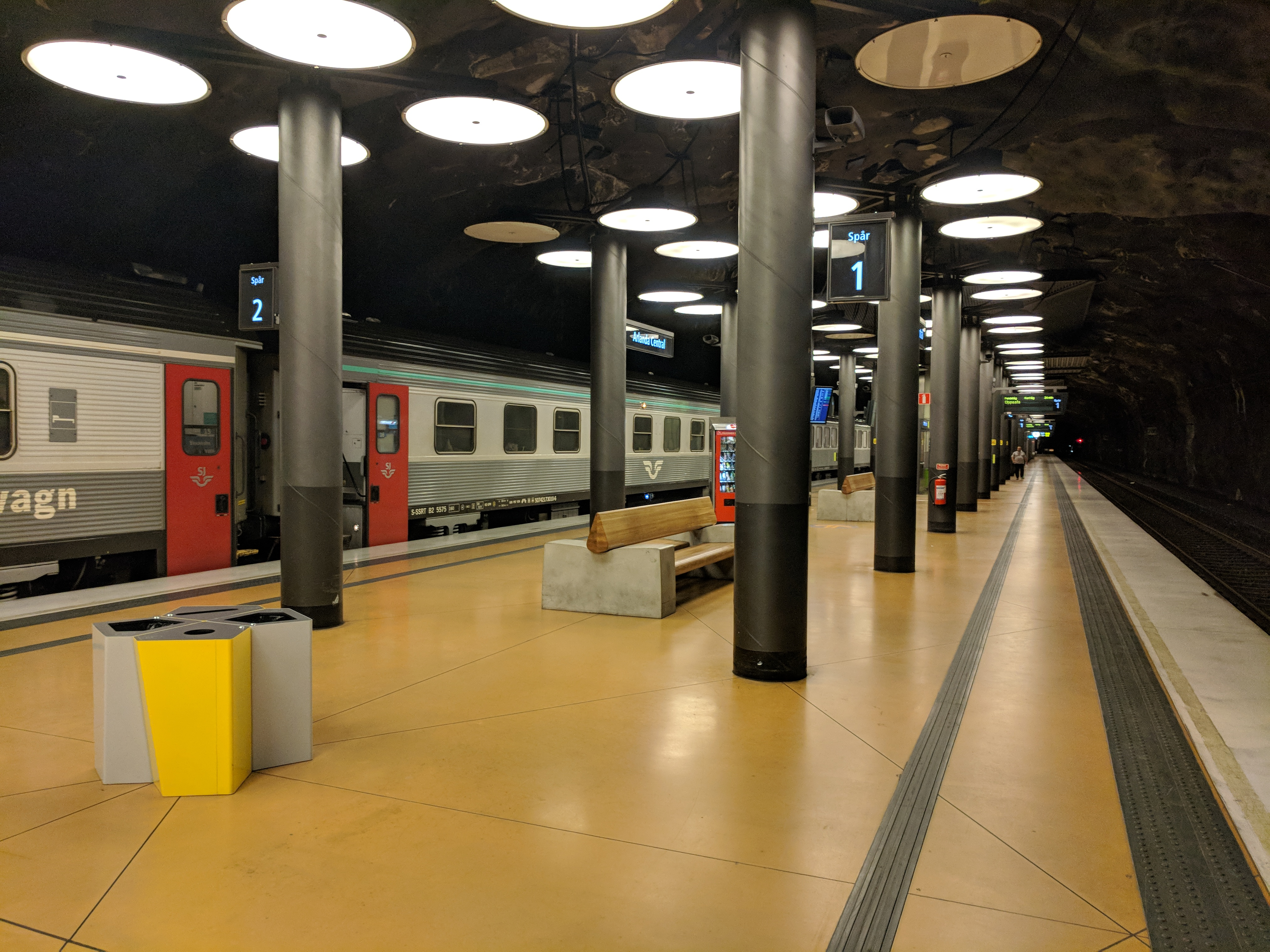
- Platform at Arlanda C

General information
- Coordinates: 59.64959°N 17.92912°E
- Owner: Arlandabanan Infrastructure AB (Swedish Government)
- Operator: A-Train AB
- Line: East Coast Line
- Platforms: 1
- Tracks: 2

Construction
- Structure type: Underground
- Accessible: Yes

History
- Opened: 2000

Passengers
- 2019: 2,500 boarding per weekday (Stockholm commuter rail)
Location

Arlanda Central Station (Swedish: Arlanda centralstation) or Arlanda C is a railway station on the Arlanda Line serving Stockholm Arlanda Airport in Sweden. It is served by various regional, intercity, and night trains operated by SJ, Mälartåg and Vy Tåg and since December 2012 also by Stockholm commuter rail.

== History ==
Plans for a railway line from the city center of Stockholm to the airport started in the early 1990s. Policy-makers wanted to allow the airport to grow without increasing the road traffic to the airport, and decided to build a railway. The project involved building a branch from the existing East Coast Line from Rosersberg and back at Odensala. Financing was secured by introducing Sweden's first public–private partnership, whereby a private consortium would be granted a 40-year permit to operate the line in exchange for all direct traffic and the right to collect usage fees from other train companies. The contract was won by A-Train in 1994, which started construction in 1995 and completed the line and station in 1999, with Arlanda C itself opening in 2000 on the East Coast Line shortly after the opening of Arlanda North and Arlanda South stations.

From 2006 to 2012, Upptåget operated a commuter train service every 30 minutes between Upplands Väsby and Uppsala via Arlanda C. At Upplands Väsby, passengers could transfer to Stockholm commuter rail. After Stockholm commuter rail started its service from Älvsjö (Tumba) to Uppsala C, Upptåget ended its commuter service,

== Facilities ==
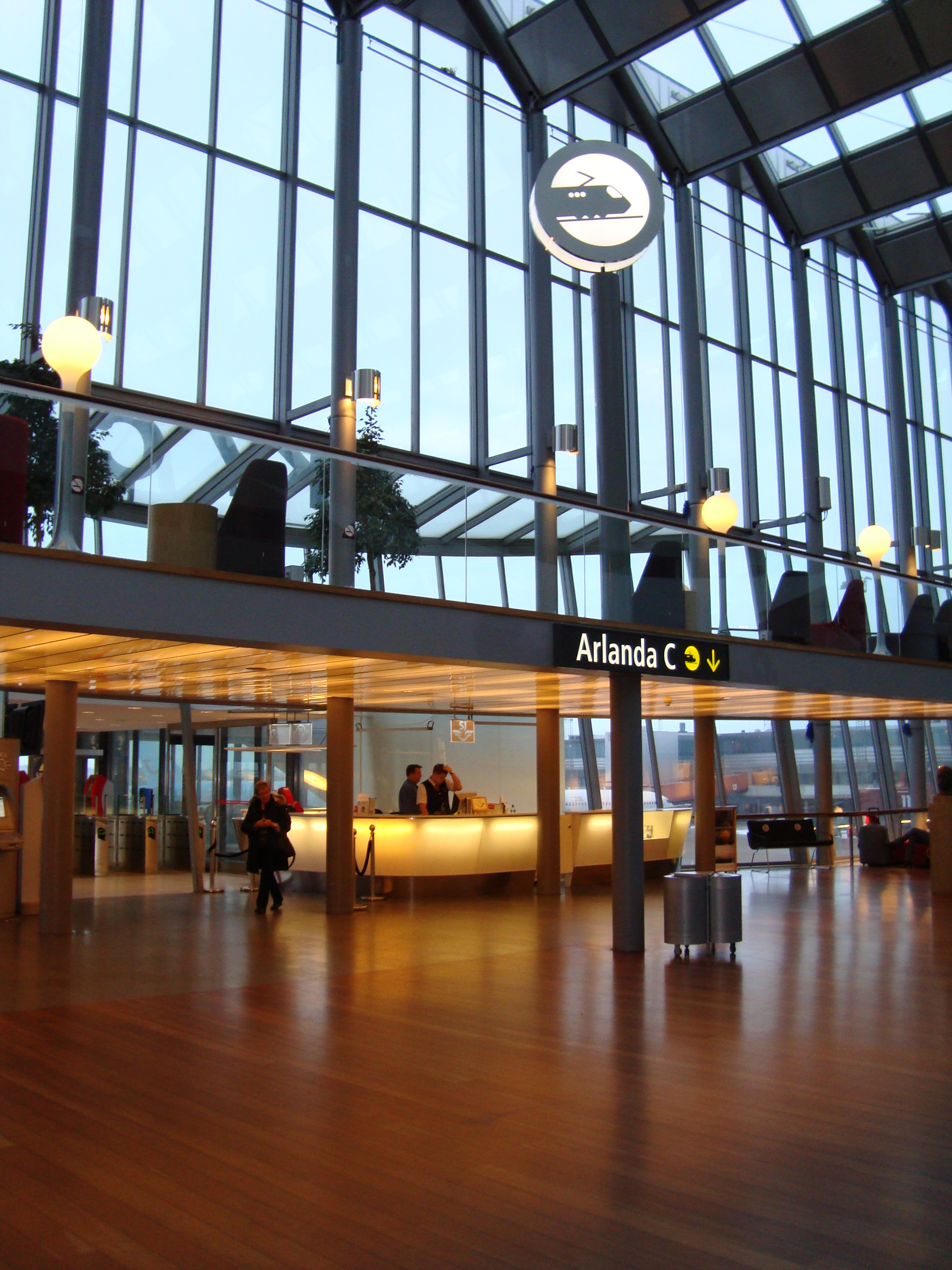
Arlanda C entrance from SkyCity

Arlanda C is one of three train stations at Arlanda, the other two being Arlanda North Station and Arlanda South Station, both which are exclusively served by the Arlanda Express. Arlanda C is located directly under SkyCity, which is between terminal 4 and 5, and is 39 kilometres (24 mi) from Stockholm Central Station. It is located in a 5-kilometre (3.1 mi) long tunnel, which is one of the longest railway tunnels in Sweden.

== Services ==
The station is served by regional and long-distance trains operated by SJ, Mälartåg and Vy Tåg

SJ operates northbound fast trains from Stockholm to Östersund, Sundsvall and Umeå.

Since 9 December 2012, Stockholm commuter rail trains stop at Arlanda C every 30 minutes (60 minutes on weekend mornings and nights). It takes 38 minutes from Arlanda C to Stockholm City station, and 18 minutes to Uppsala C.

Preceding station	Stockholm commuter rail	Following station
Knivsta towards Uppsala C	40	Upplands Väsby towards Södertälje Centrum
Preceding station	SJ	Following station
Uppsala C towards Duved	Northern Main Line	Stockholm C Terminus
Uppsala C towards Umeå C	East Coast Line	Stockholm C Terminus
Uppsala C towards Falun Central or Mora	Dala Line	Stockholm C Terminus
Uppsala C towards Luleå or Narvik	Night Trains to Upper Norrland	Stockholm C Terminus
