= Uppsala Central Station =

Railway station in Uppsala, Sweden

Uppsala C
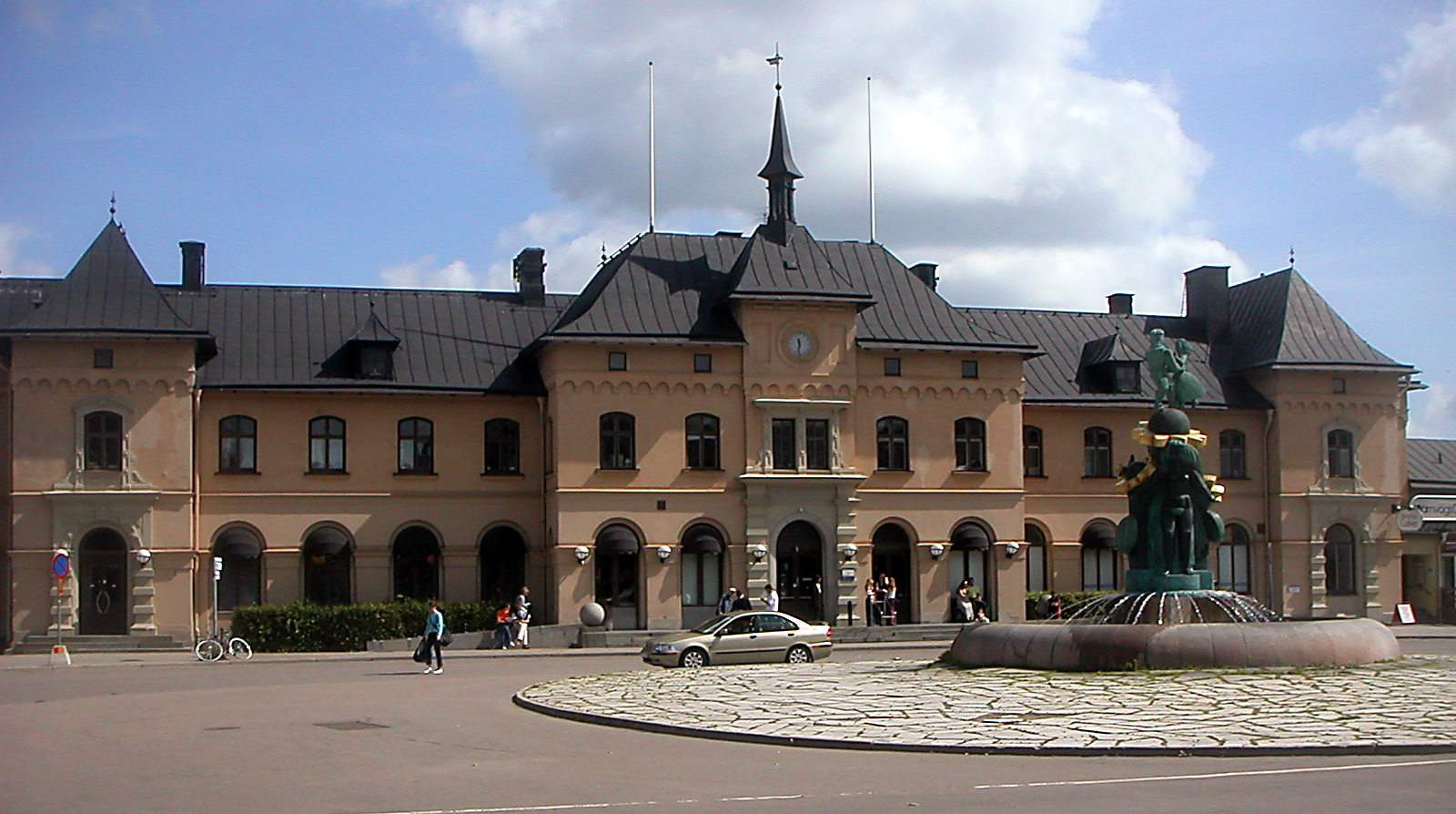
- The old station building, opened in 1866.

General information
- Location: Olof Palmes Plats 10; 753 21 Uppsala; Sweden
- Coordinates: 59°51′31″N 17°38′46″E
- Elevation: 7 m (23 ft)
- Owner: Jernhusen (station infrastructure); Trafikverket (rail infrastructure)
- Operator: SJ
- Lines: Uppsala-Borlänge; Stockholm-Uppsala
- Platforms: 5
- Tracks: 8

History
- Opened: 20 September 1866 (160 years ago)

Services
Preceding station	Stockholm commuter rail	Following station
Terminus	40	Knivsta towards Södertälje Centrum
Preceding station	SJ	Following station
Sala towards Falun Central or Mora	Dala Line	Arlanda C towards Stockholm C
Gävle C towards Umeå C	East Coast Line	Arlanda C towards Stockholm C
Gävle C towards Duved	Northern Main Line	Arlanda C towards Stockholm C
Gävle C towards Luleå or Narvik	Night Trains to Upper Norrland	Arlanda C towards Stockholm C
Preceding station	Long distance trains	Following station
Östersund C towards Storlien	Snälltåget	Arlanda C towards Malmö C
Preceding station	Regional trains	Following station
Storvreta towards Gävle C	Mälartåg	Terminus
Morgongåva towards Linköping C	Mälartåg	Terminus
Terminus	Mälartåg	Knivsta towards Örebro C
Location

Uppsala Central Station (Swedish: Uppsala centralstation) or Uppsala C is a railway station in Uppsala, Sweden. It lies on the East Coast Line, which runs south to Stockholm and north to Gävle and Sundsvall. It is also the southeastern terminus for the Dala Line which runs northwest ending in Mora. There are frequent commuter services to Stockholm. Long-distance trains, such as the SJ 3000, connect Uppsala to the northern parts of the country. Many trains, including the Stockholm commuter rail (Pendeltåg), also leave the main line to connect Uppsala with Stockholm-Arlanda Airport. Next to the station is a hub for the regional coach services operated by Upplands Lokaltrafik. Many local bus routes run through or near the station grounds as well, and there is a large area set aside for bicycle parking.

Located just beside Uppsala Central Station is Uppsala östra railway station (Uppsala east), the western terminus of the Upsala-Lenna Jernväg heritage railway, which was relocated closer to Uppsala C in 2012.

Uppsala Central Station will serve as the terminus of both lines of the Uppsala Tramway, which is planned to open in 2029.

== History ==
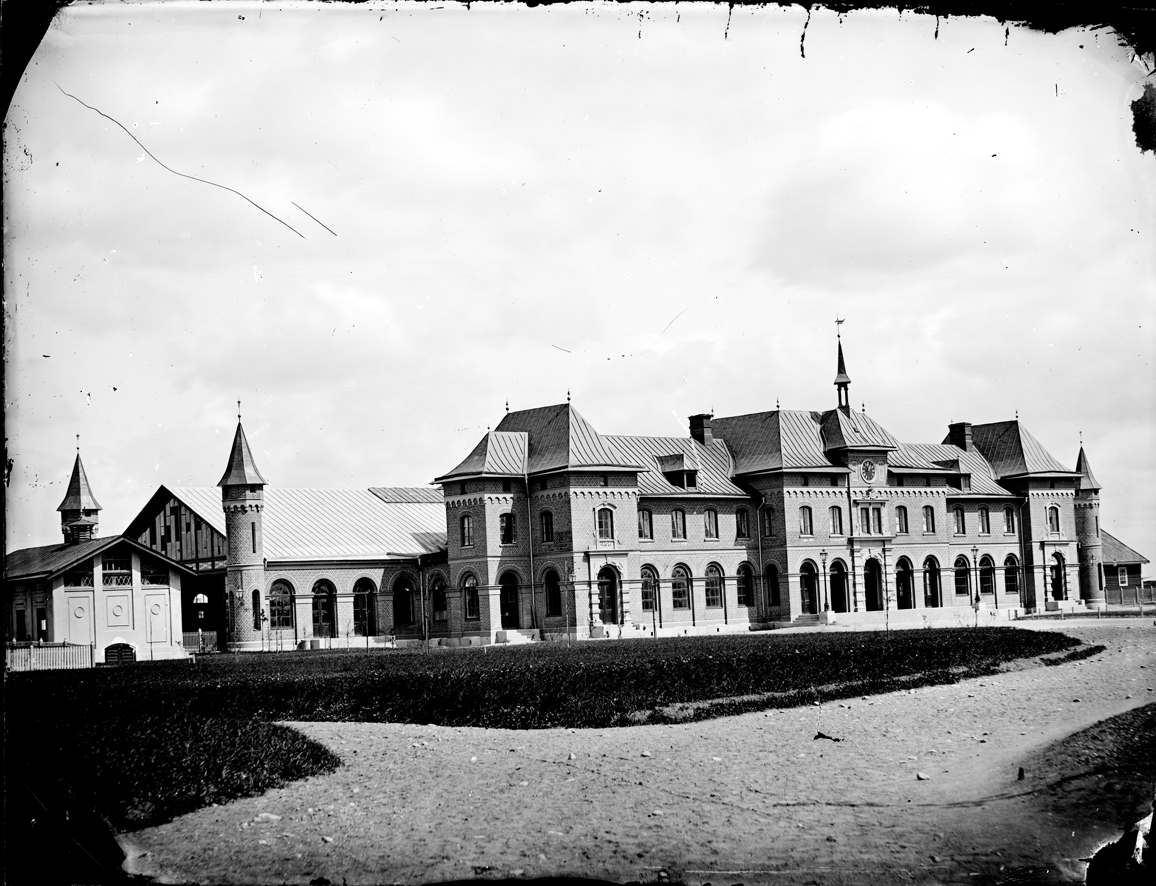
Original station building with depot c. 1870

=== Old station building (1866–2011) ===
The old station building was designed by Adolf W. Edelsvärd, who described its architecture as "Dutch Renaissance-style". Along with the accompanying railway, the station was opened in September 1866 by king Charles XV. Originally, the building had an adjoining rail depot with a tower in each corner, however this was demolished in 1918. The building has been expanded twice, once in 1889 and again in 1918. The ground floor was renovated completely 1934–35. In 1986, the building was listed (protected as a cultural heritage) by the Swedish Government. After the station building became defunct in 2011, a brasserie opened in the building.

=== Renovation (2005–2011) ===
From 2005 to 2011, the station site was renovated to build the Resecentrum (Travel Centre) which opened in December 2011. This project included: a new station building, just to the south of the existing one — constructed 2009–2010; an underpass under the tracks for pedestrians and bicycles; Stadshusgatan, a busway on the west side of the station, so that passengers no longer need to cross Kungsgatan to reach southbound buses (northbound buses remain on the near side of Kungsgatan); Stationsgatan, a new road extending Storgatan on the east side of the station; a new car park, and more bicycle parking; a new public square, and various beautification projects. The total cost of the project exceeded US$200 million.

According to an opinion poll, published in Uppsalatidningen on 14 January 2011, where 1,247 people had been asked whether they believed that the new centre was important for Uppsala as a cultural centre and university town, and for the commercial activity in the area, 47% of the respondents stated that they believed it to be "very important" and 34% answered "fairly important".

=== Underpass flooding (2018) ===
On 29 July 2018, the station's pedestrian underpass was flooded due to heavy rain after a long dry period. Several people decided to use the underpass as a swimming pool, bringing floats, snorkeling gear, and water pistols. This received international media coverage. (Note: The Straits Times, France 24, and NDTV.) The underpass was closed due to fears that the water posed a risk of electrocution. Later that night, the water was pumped out.

=== Future plans ===
In 2018, it was announced that the number of southbound tracks (towards Stockholm) would be doubled, from 2 to 4. At an estimated cost of 6.7 billion Swedish kronor (€660M as of July 2021), construction is set to begin in 2026. To accommodate the increased traffic, the station complex will be widened and new platforms built.

== Services ==
=== SJ ===
SJ operates northbound high-speed rail services to Sundsvall, Umeå, Östersund, and Duved using the SJ 3000. Inter-city rail services run west to Falun and Mora, north to Gävle and Ljusdal, and south to Stockholm and Linköping. Regional services run to Stockholm, with an approximate frequency of 2 trains per hour, and occasionally to Örebro as part of the Mälartåg network. SJ also runs night trains to Umeå and Duved.

=== Upplands Lokaltrafik ===
Upplands Lokaltrafik (UL) operates the Upptåget commuter rail service. It runs north on the East Coast Line with trains to Tierp and Gävle using the ER1 double-decker train. It also serves Sala on the Dala Line using the older X52. It primarily uses the northbound terminating platforms. Twice weekly, it also continues south to Stockholm Arlanda Airport. The company also operates the local and regional bus services at the station.

=== Storstockholms Lokaltrafik ===
Storstockholms Lokaltrafik (SL) operates frequent commuter rail services to Stockholm and Södertälje using the X60 as part of the Stockholm commuter rail network.

=== Vy Tåg ===
As of 13 December 2020, Vy Tåg operates night trains to Narvik and Luleå after taking over from SJ.

== Gallery ==
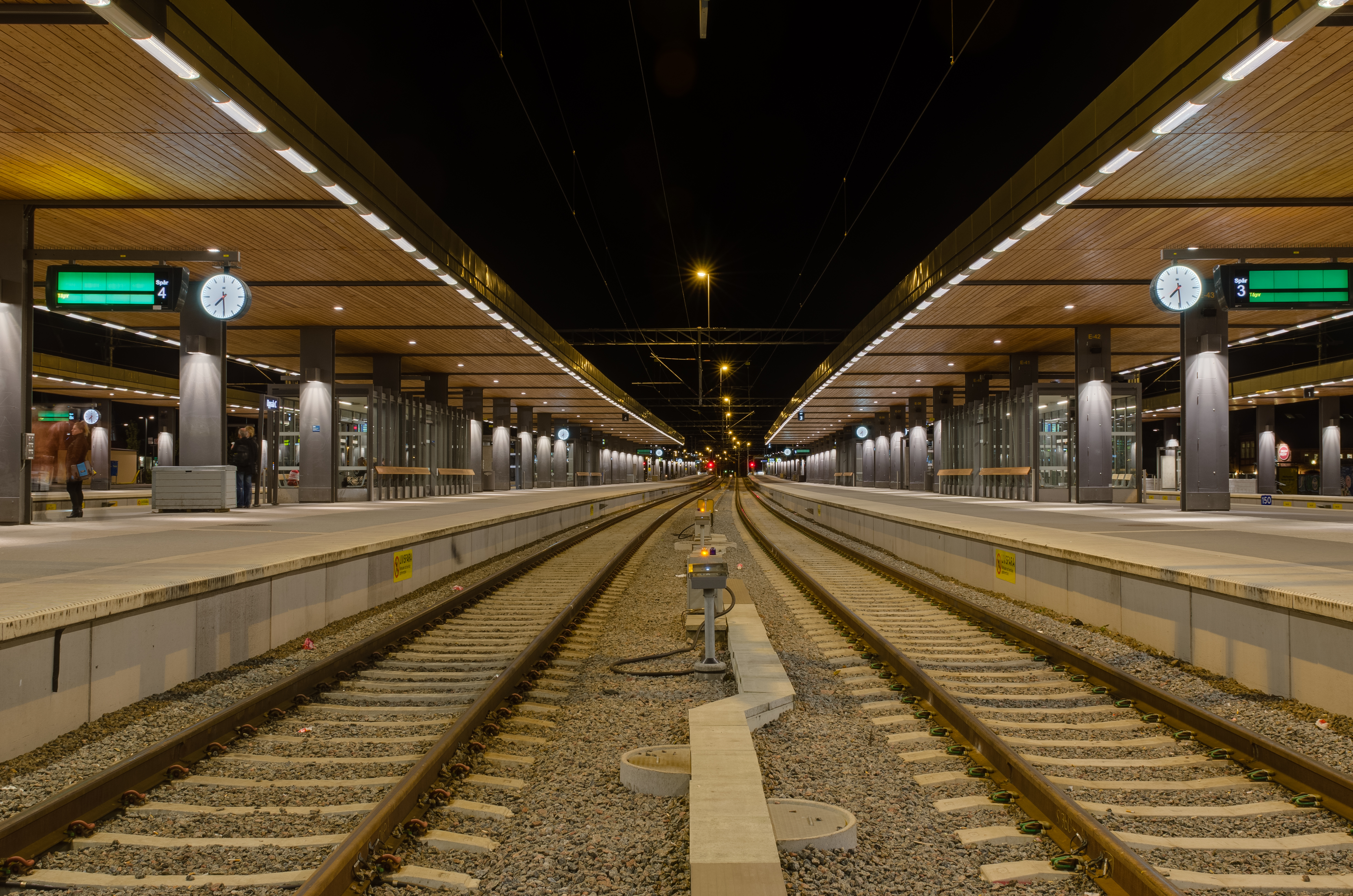
Tracks 3 and 4 after renovation

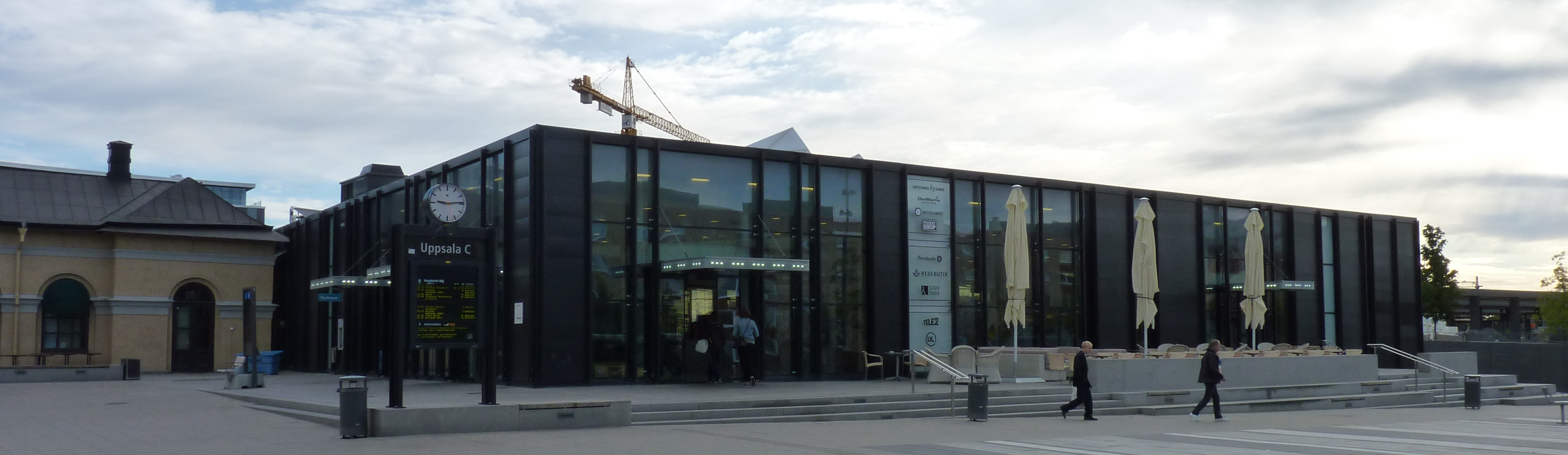
The new station building, located beside the old one

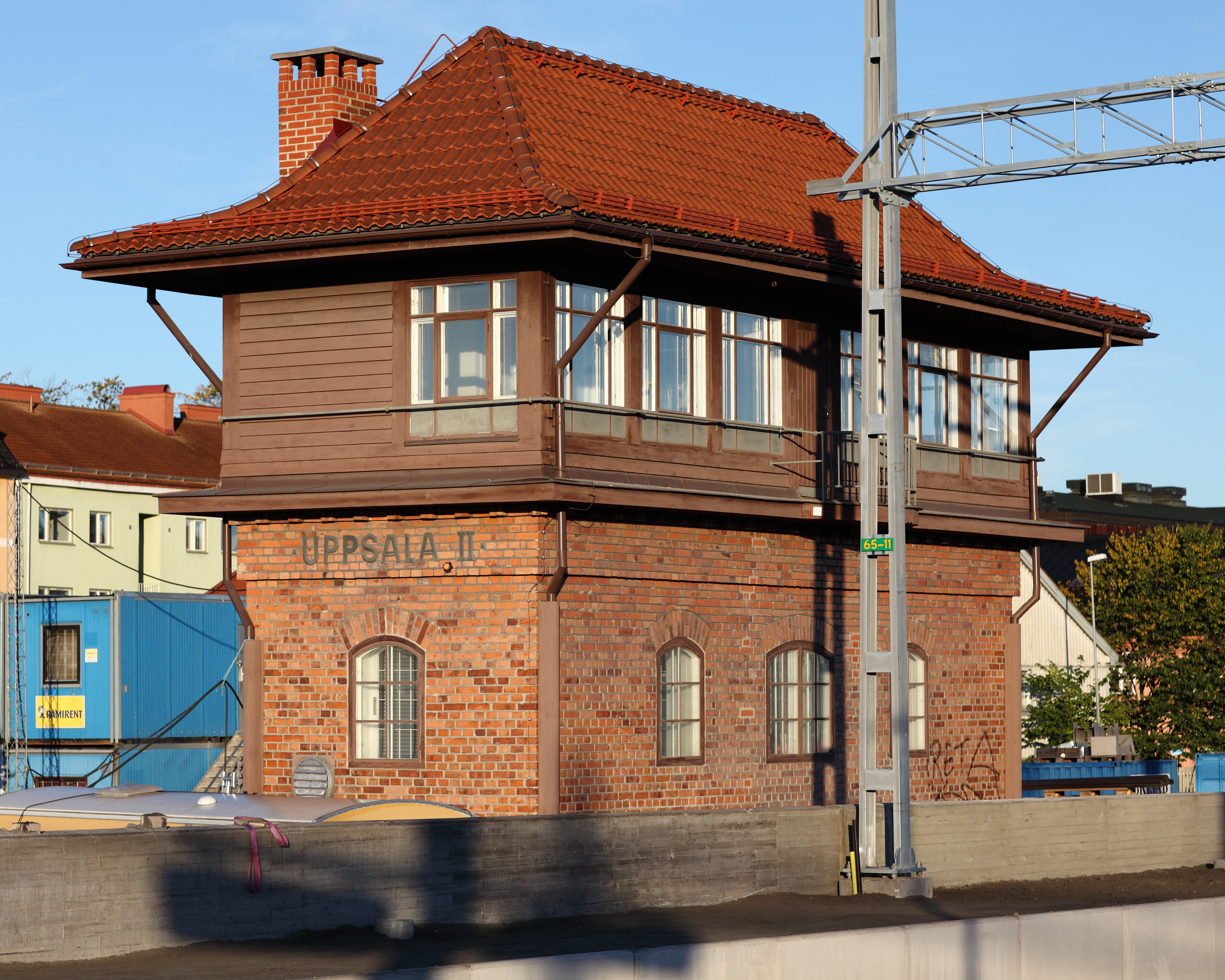
Defunct signal box

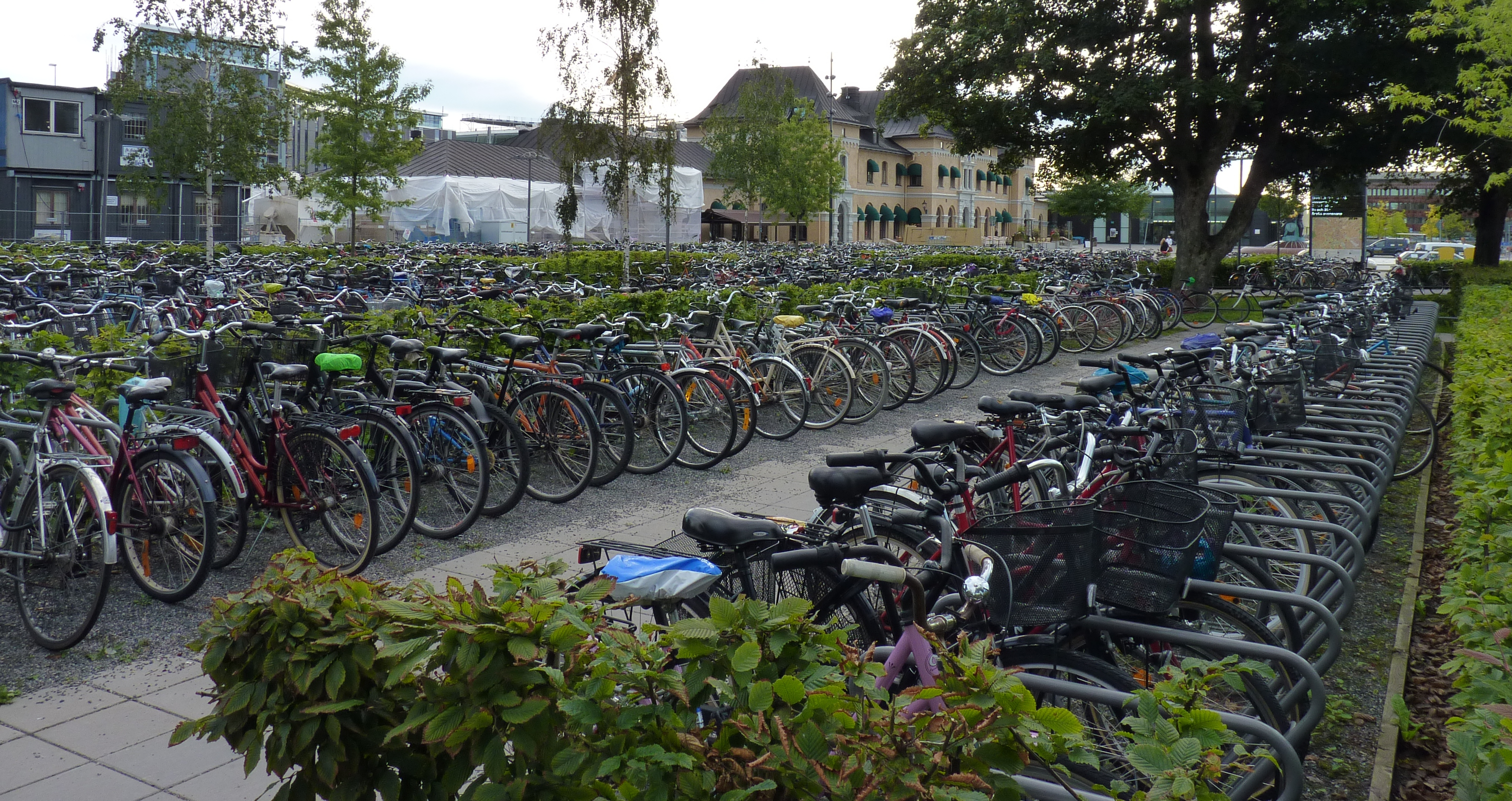
Bicycle racks

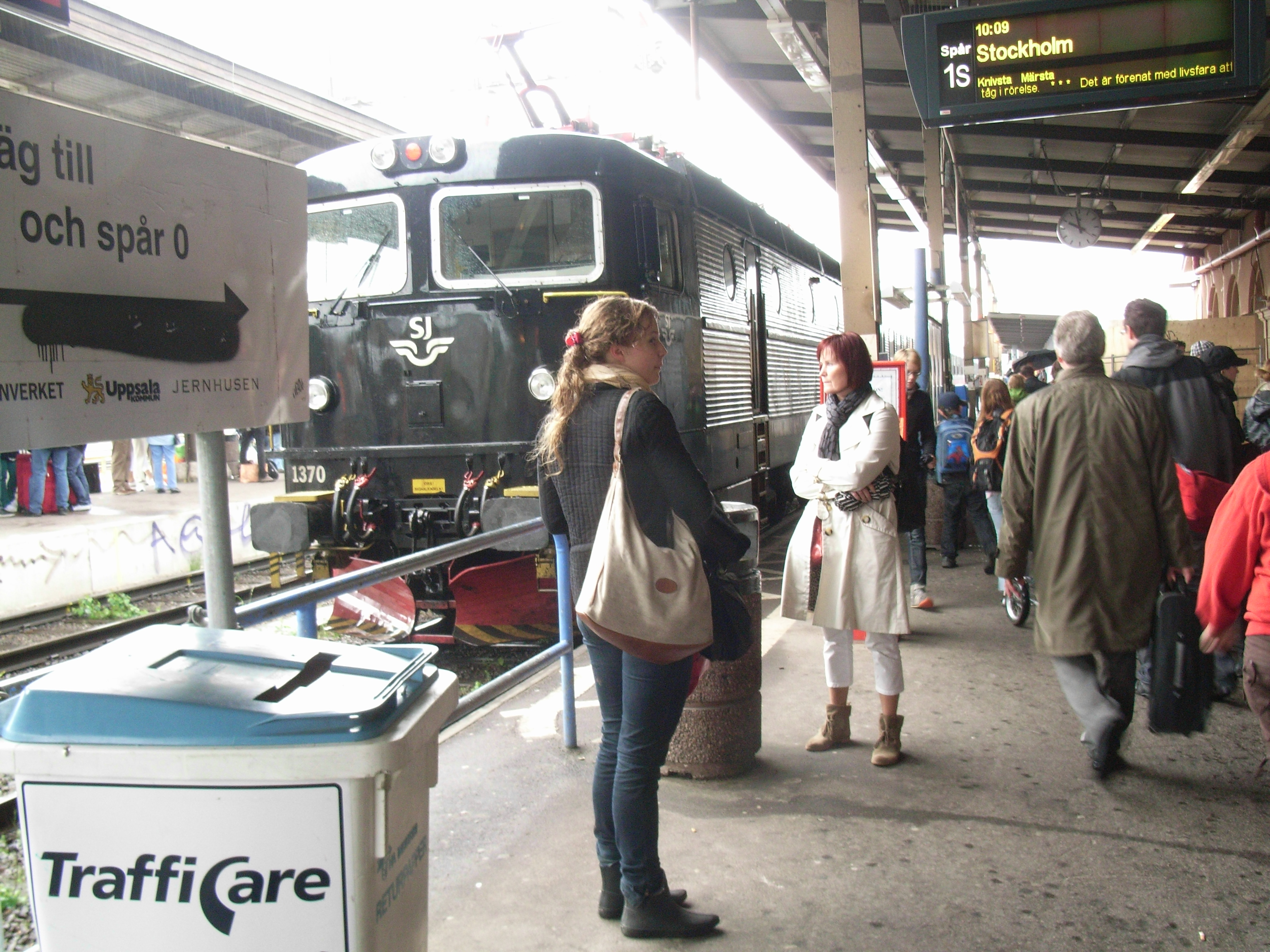
SJ's Uppsalapendeln in 2009

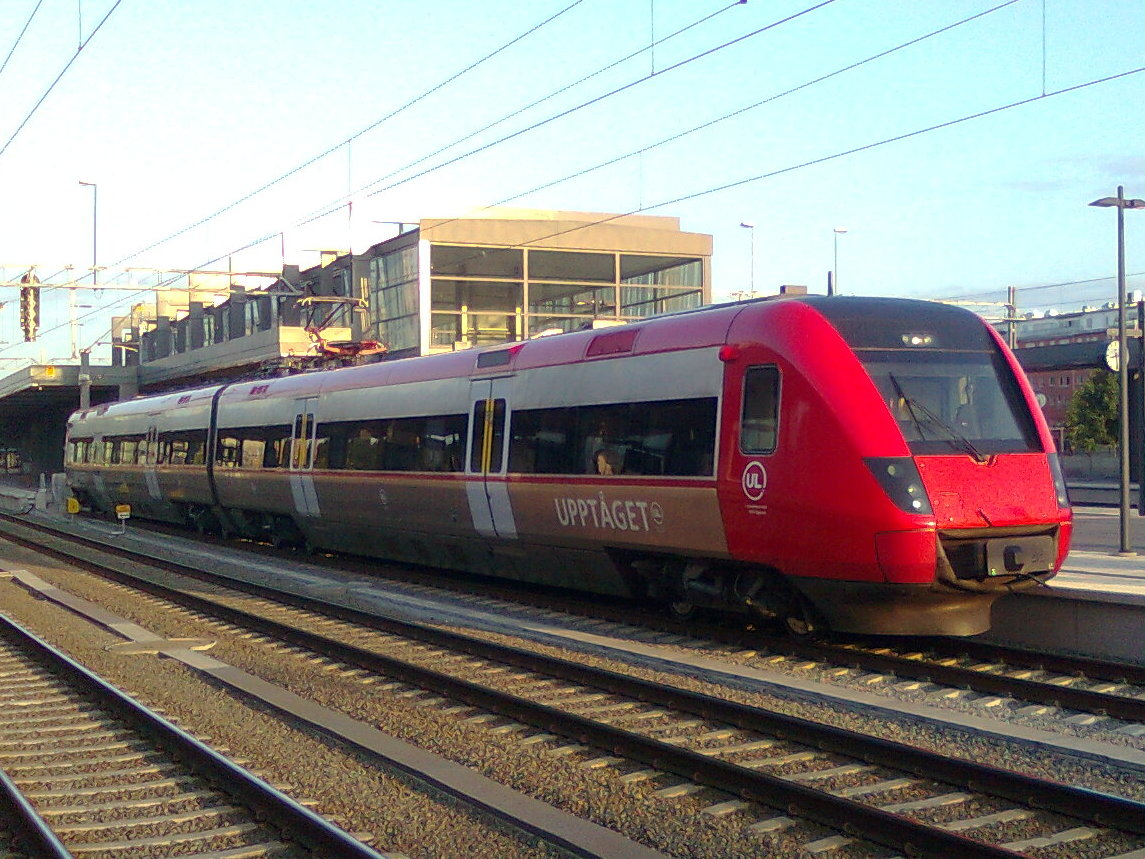
UL's Upptåget in 2016
