= Gävle Central Station =

Railway station in Gävle, Sweden

Gävle Central Station Gävle centralstation
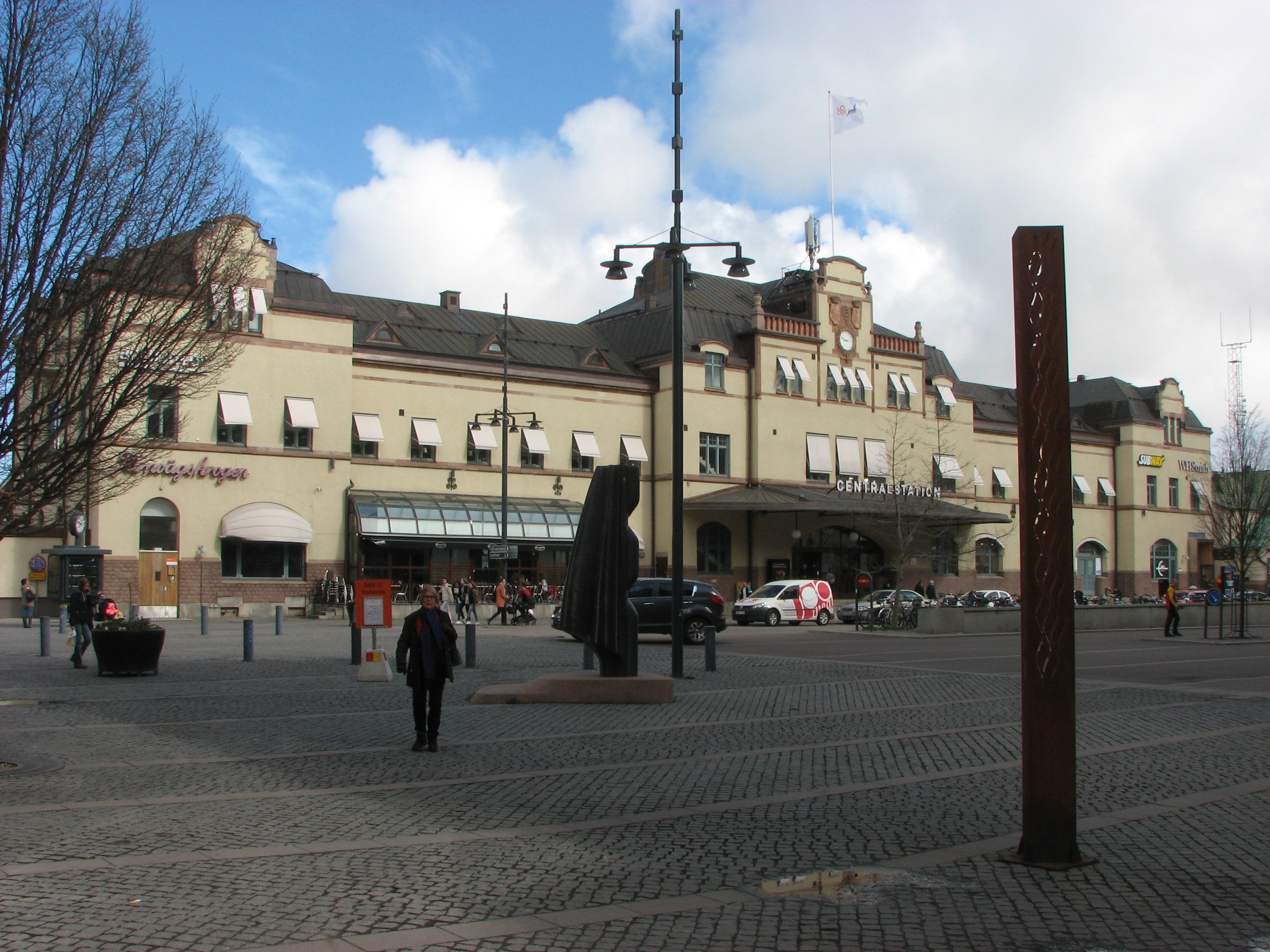
- Station building

General information
- Location: Gävleborg County; Sweden
- Coordinates: 60°40′34″N 17°9′4″E
- Elevation: 5 metres (16 ft)
- Owner: Jernhusen
- Lines: East Coast Line; Bergslagen Line; Northern Main Line
- Tracks: 5

Construction
- Accessible: yes
- Architect: Mårten A Spiering

Other information
- Station code: Gc

History
- Opened: 1877

Services
Preceding station	SJ	Following station
Söderhamn towards Umeå C	East Coast Line	Uppsala C towards Stockholm C
Bollnäs towards Duved	Northern Main Line	Uppsala C towards Stockholm C
Terminus	Gävle–Linköping	Tierp towards Linköping C
Söderhamn towards Luleå or Narvik	Night Trains to Upper Norrland	Uppsala C towards Stockholm C
Preceding station	Regional trains	Following station
Terminus	Mälartåg	Furuvik towards Uppsala Central
Terminus	Tåg i Bergslagen	Sandviken towards Mjölby
Preceding station	X-Tåget	Following station
Ljusne towards Sundsvall West	East Coast Line Sundsvall–Gävle	Terminus
Ockelbo towards Ljusdal	Northern Main Line Ljusdal–Gävle	Terminus

Other services
Bus
Location

Gävle Central Station is located in the city of Gävle, Sweden, at the East Coast Line and the endpoints of the Bergslagen Line and the Northern Main Line. Fast long-distance trains stop here, and also regional trains in multiple directions. The station is located around 300 metres (980 ft) from the traditional midpoint of the city. Regional and city buses stop nearby. The Swedish Railway Museum is located in the southern part of Gävle.

== History ==
Railway traffic started in Gävle in 1859 when the Gävle–Storvik–Falun Line was opened, called Gävle–Dala Line, now called Bergslagen Line. This railway was then isolated, but did connect Falun with the port of Gävle. The first part of the Northern Main Line Stockholm–Uppsala–Krylbo–Storvik created in 1875 a railway connection between Gävle and Stockholm with a detour. In 1874 the Uppsala - Gävle line was opened for traffic, a much shorter route Stockholm–Gävle.

Next railway to be built was the Gävle–Ockelbo line, opened 1884. The Northern Main Line was in 1876-1881 continued from Storvik fairly near Gävle 265 km further north past Ockelbo to Ånge. The Gävle–Ockelbo line has later been redefined as a branch of the Northern Main Line, and is the normal route for trains Stockholm–Ånge.

Much later the East Coast Line Gävle–Sundsvall was built. Traffic was started Gävle–Ljusne in 1926 and Gävle–Sundsvall 1927. The delay was because steamboats were preferred between the coastal cities.

Gävle is a city founded in the Middle Ages. Its port with direct access to the Bothnian Sea has been the base of its economy. When railways were built the city became an important industrial city and an even more important port city.

Gävle Central Station was opened in 1877. Before this, the two existing railways had other temporary wooden station buildings, for the line to Falun located at the port slightly northeast from the present station, and for the line to Uppsala south of the Gavleån river, called Gävle South. Both these station buildings have been removed. The Central station building was rebuilt in 1901.
