= Örebro Central Station =

Railway station in Örebro, Sweden

Örebro C
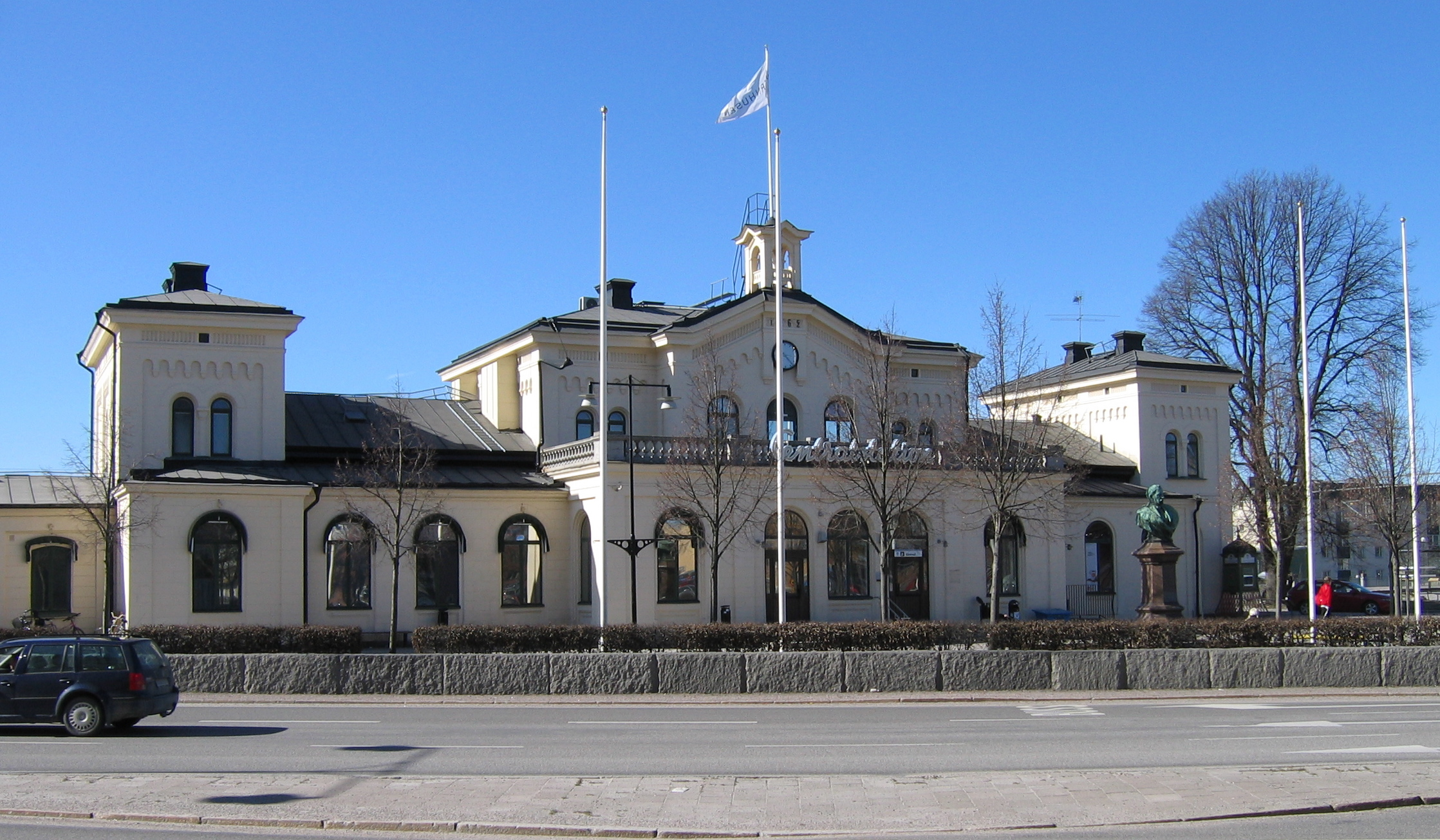

General information
- Location: Östra Bangatan 1; 703 61 Örebro; Sweden
- Coordinates: 59°16′43″N 15°12′42″E
- Owner: Jernhusen (station infrastructure); Trafikverket (rail infrastructure)
- Operator: SJ
- Line: Stockholm-Örebro/Frövi
- Platforms: 2
- Tracks: 3

History
- Opened: 1867; 159 years ago

Services
Preceding station	SJ	Following station
Arboga towards Stockholm C	Mälaren Line and Western Main Line	Örebro S towards Göteborg C
Preceding station	Regional trains	Following station
Arboga towards Uppsala C	Mälartåg	Örebro S Terminus
Frövi towards Gävle C	Tåg i Bergslagen	Örebro S towards Mjölby
Preceding station	Västtågen	Following station
Terminus	Gothenburg-Lidköping-Mariestad-Örebro Line	Örebro S towards Göteborg C
Location

Örebro Central Station (Swedish: Örebro centralstation) is a railway station in Örebro, Sweden, located north of city center. The station building was designed by architect Adolf W. Edelsvärd and was originally named Örebro Norra (Örebro North Station).

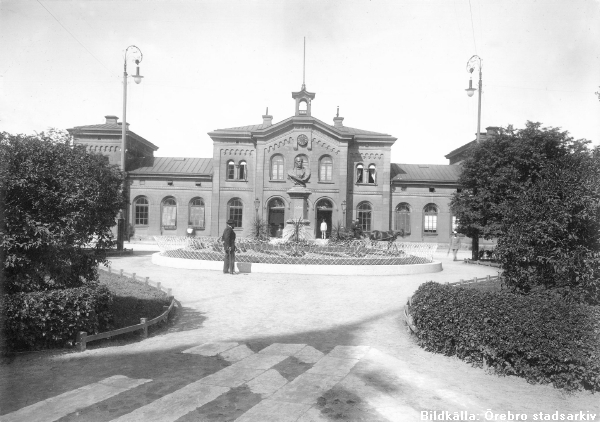
Örebro Central Station in 1903
