= Uppsala östra railway station =

Railway station in Uppsala, Sweden

Uppsala östra
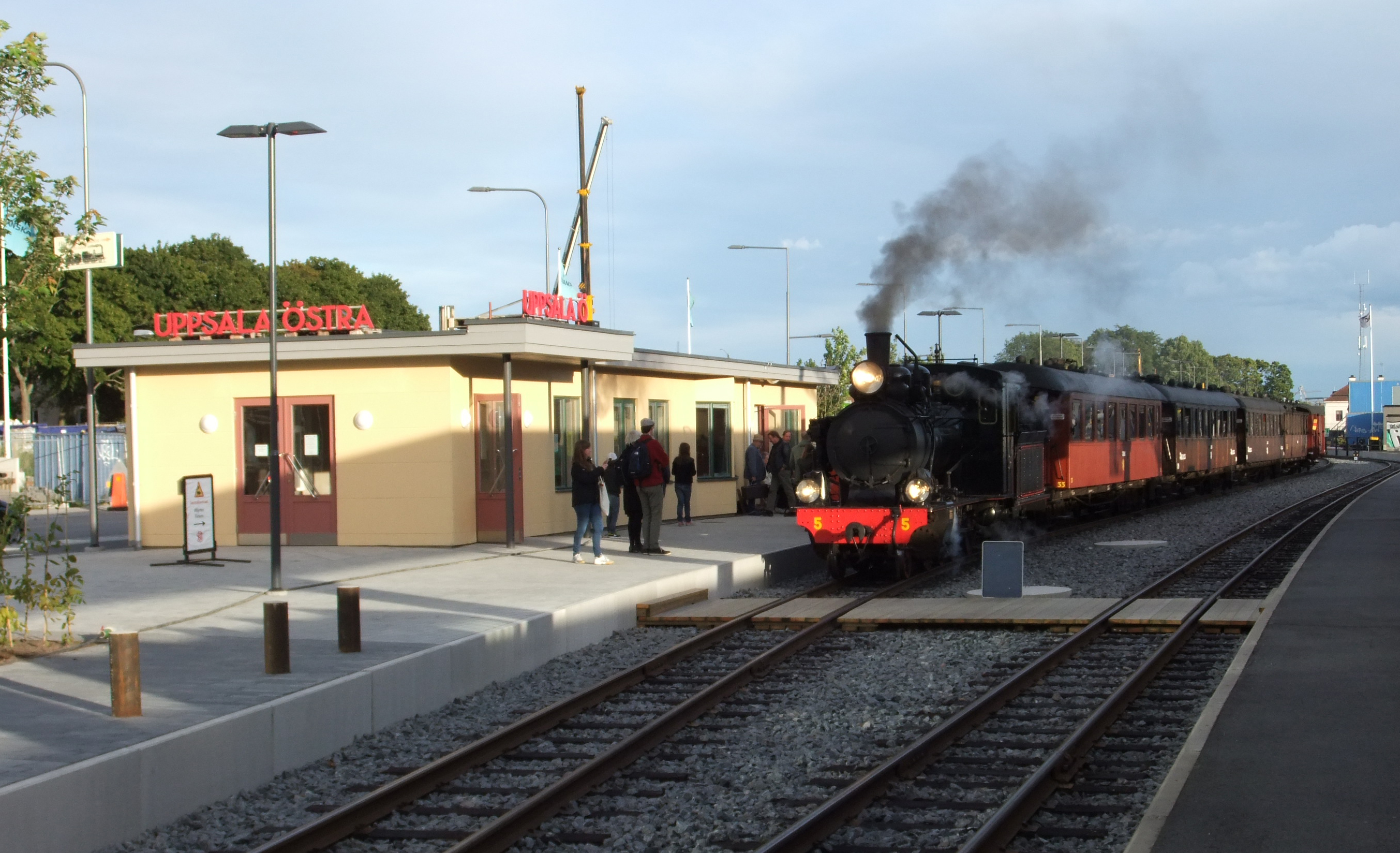
- The new Uppsala östra station from 2012

General information
- Location: Uppsala, Sweden; Sweden
- Coordinates: 59°51′30″N 17°38′55″E
- System: Railway station
- Line: Upsala-Lenna Jernväg
- Tracks: 2

Construction
- Structure type: At-grade

Other information
- Status: Operational (Heritage railway service)
- Station code: Uö

History
- Opened: 1876
- Rebuilt: 2011
- Original company: Uppsala-Lenna Railway
- Pre-grouping: Stockholm-Roslagen Railway

Key dates
- 2011: Rebuilt at Uppsala Travel Centre

Services
Heritage railway
Location

Uppsala östra railway station (abbreviated Uppsala Ö) is a heritage railway station in Uppsala, Sweden. It was originally located on Storgatan, about 100 meters from Uppsala Central Station. The station served as the western terminus of the Uppsala-Lenna Railway and later the Stockholm-Roslagen Railway, before becoming the main station for the heritage railway Upsala-Lenna Jernväg.

== History ==
Originally, Lennakatten's station in Uppsala was located at the intersection of Storgatan and Roslagsgatan. The first station building was completed in November 1876 and was entirely made of wood. It was replaced in 1935 by a larger station building constructed in the functionalist style, which was popular at the time. By then, the population of Uppsala had increased from 13,000 in 1876 to over 33,000. This station building remained in use until 1971.

Freight transport was an important source of income for ULJ and SRJ (the companies operating the railway until 1959). Since there was a connection to SJ's mainline trains in Uppsala, some cargo from ULJ/SRJ trains was transferred to SJ’s network. Due to the difference in track gauge, cargo had to be manually reloaded for many years between ULJ/SRJ narrow-gauge wagons and SJ’s standard-gauge wagons at a transfer platform. This requirement was eliminated in 1955 when a ramp was built, allowing standard-gauge wagons to be loaded onto narrow-gauge transporter wagons.

=== Relocation ===
In 2005, a major reconstruction of Uppsala Central Station began, requiring Uppsala östra to be relocated. Between 2006 and 2011, Uppsala östra was temporarily situated in Bergsbrunnaparken, where a temporary platform and station building were erected. In 2012, the new Uppsala östra was inaugurated at the new Uppsala Central Station. The new station building is architecturally inspired by the 1935 station building.

Uppsala östra has the Swedish railway station code Uö.

== Future ==
As part of ongoing railway expansion plans in Uppsala, discussions about relocating Uppsala östra began in 2020. One proposal involves moving the station further south, while another considers returning it to Bergsbrunnaparken, where it was temporarily located between 2006 and 2011. No final decision has been made.
