= Storvik, Sweden =

Storvik
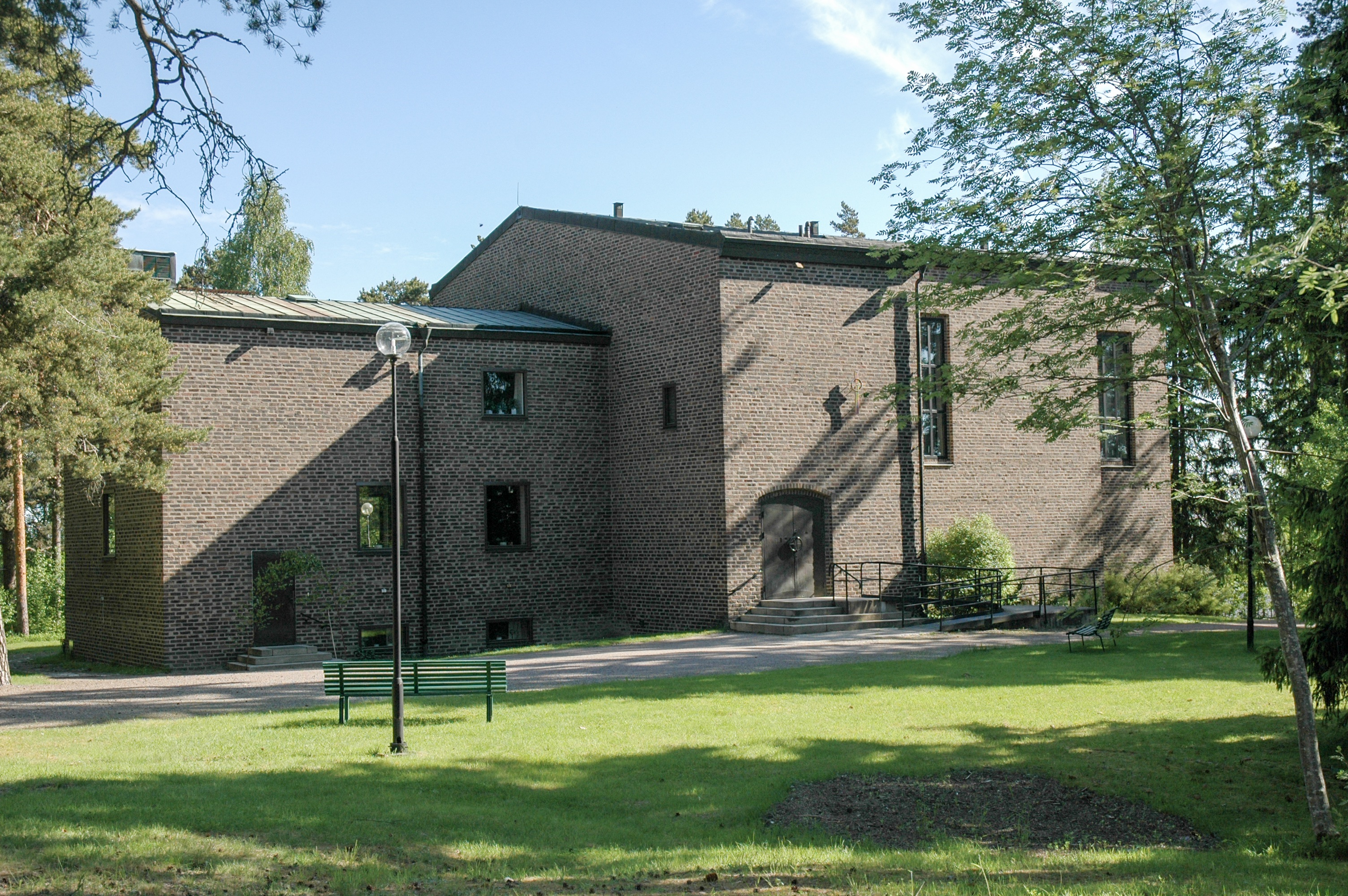
- Storvik Church in June 2010

- Location within Sweden Gävleborg Location within Sweden
- Coordinates: 60°36′N 16°31′E
- Country: Sweden
- Province: Gästrikland
- County: Gävleborg County
- Municipality: Sandviken Municipality

Area
  - Total: 2.62 km^{2} (1.01 sq mi)

Population (31 December 2010)
  - Total: 2,165
  - Density: 826/km^{2} (2,140/sq mi)
- Time zone: UTC+1 (CET)
  - Summer (DST): UTC+2 (CEST)

Storvik is a locality situated in Sandviken Municipality, Gävleborg County, Sweden with 2,165 inhabitants in 2010.

Storvik was and still is an important railway junction for freight trains. Here the Northern Main Line, the Bergslagen Line and the goods route through Bergslagen meet up.

Storvik once had the longest train platform in Europe.
