= UL (Sweden) =

Kollektivtrafikförvaltningen UL
- Founded: 1954 (as Upplands Lokaltrafik); 2012 (as Kollektivtrafikförvaltningen UL)
- Headquarters: Uppsala, Sweden
- Service area: Uppsala County, Gävleborg County, Västmanland, Stockholm.
- Service type: Public transport
- Alliance: Keolis
- Hubs: Uppsala Central Station

Kollektivtrafikförvaltningen UL (English: Public transport administration UL) (formerly Upplands Lokaltrafik until 1 January 2012) is the integrated transport authority (Swedish: Trafikhuvudman) responsible for public transport buses and trains at the county level (Swedish: länstrafik) in Uppsala County, Sweden. Their name is derived from the historical province of Uppland, which included the modern county along with part of what is now Stockholm County.

== Buses ==
The green city buses (Stadsbussarna) in Uppsala are operated by UL in co-operation with Gamla Uppsala Buss. Yellow regional buses (Regionbussarna) cover most of the county, with a major hub at Uppsala Central Station; some run on to major destinations in neighbouring counties. UL's long-distance services are operated by private contractors, including Keolis and others.

== Trains ==
UL's former commuter railway route, Upptåget, connected Uppsala and neighbouring small towns with Tierp and Gävle in the north, and Morgongåva, Heby and Sala in the west.

Until 2012 Upptåget also connected Uppsala with Arlanda, and Upplands-Väsby where SL had further connection, but after that year SL operates this route as part of Stockholm commuter rail network.

Operation of Upptåget trains was previously contracted out to the national railway SJ, who also operate services through the county on their own behalf, connecting it with destinations farther afield including Stockholm, Sundsvall, and Falun. DSB won a contract to operate Upptåget from June 2011 until September 2017, when Transdev took over the contract.

From December 2021, Upptåget was planned to disappear as its own traffic system and from 12 June 2022 it became a part of Mälartåg, which is a system for regional train traffic in the Mälar Valley, established in 2019.

There are 16 stations, of which 3 (Furuvik, Gävle and Sala) are outside Uppsala County.

=== Former ===
- X10 (from 1991 until 1998)
- X11 (3 units on loan from Krösatågen (sv) from April 2017 to December 2019)
- X12 (from 1997 until 2003)
- X52 (from 2002 until 2022)
- Stadler DOSTO (from 2019 until 2022)
