= Mälardalstrafik =

Regional rail transport company in Sweden

Mälardalstrafik MÄLAB AB

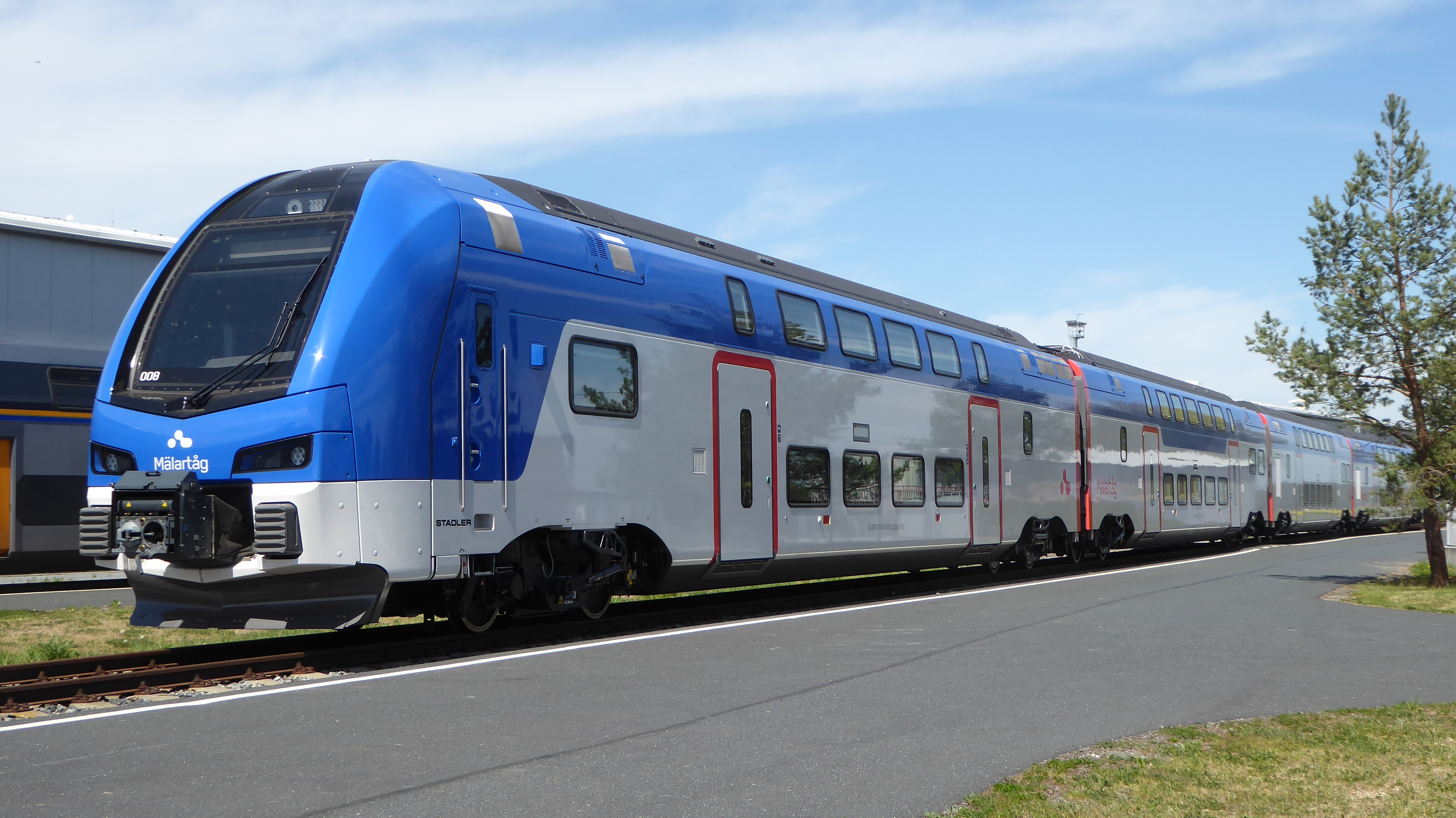
- A Mälartåg ER1 Train
- Trade name: Mälartåg (Train Services); Mälardalstrafik (Company)
- Type: Aktiebolag
- Industry: Transport
- Predecessor: Tåg i Mälardalen AB
- Founded: 1991
- Headquarters: Stockholm, Sweden
- Area served: Stockholm Mälaren Region
- Revenue: 1.3 billion SEK (2023)
- Total assets: 392 million SEK (2023)
- Owner: Region Stockholm (35%); Region Sörmland (13%); Region Uppsala (13%); Region Västmanland (13%); Region Örebro County (13%); Region Östergötland (13%)
- Number of employees: 28 (Direct employees); 700 (Via Operating Contractor)
- Website: https://malardalstrafik.se/en/ (Corporate) https://malartag.se/en/ (Train Services)

Mälartåg
- Logo of Mälartåg

Overview
- Number of lines: 5
- Number of stations: 44
- Annual ridership: 12.5 million (2023)

Operation
- Operator: Transdev
- Number of vehicles: 59

Technical
- System length: 102.3 km (63.6 mi)
- Track gauge: 1,435 mm (4 ft 8 1/2 in) standard gauge
- Electrification: 15 kV 16 2/3 Hz AC from overhead catenary
System map
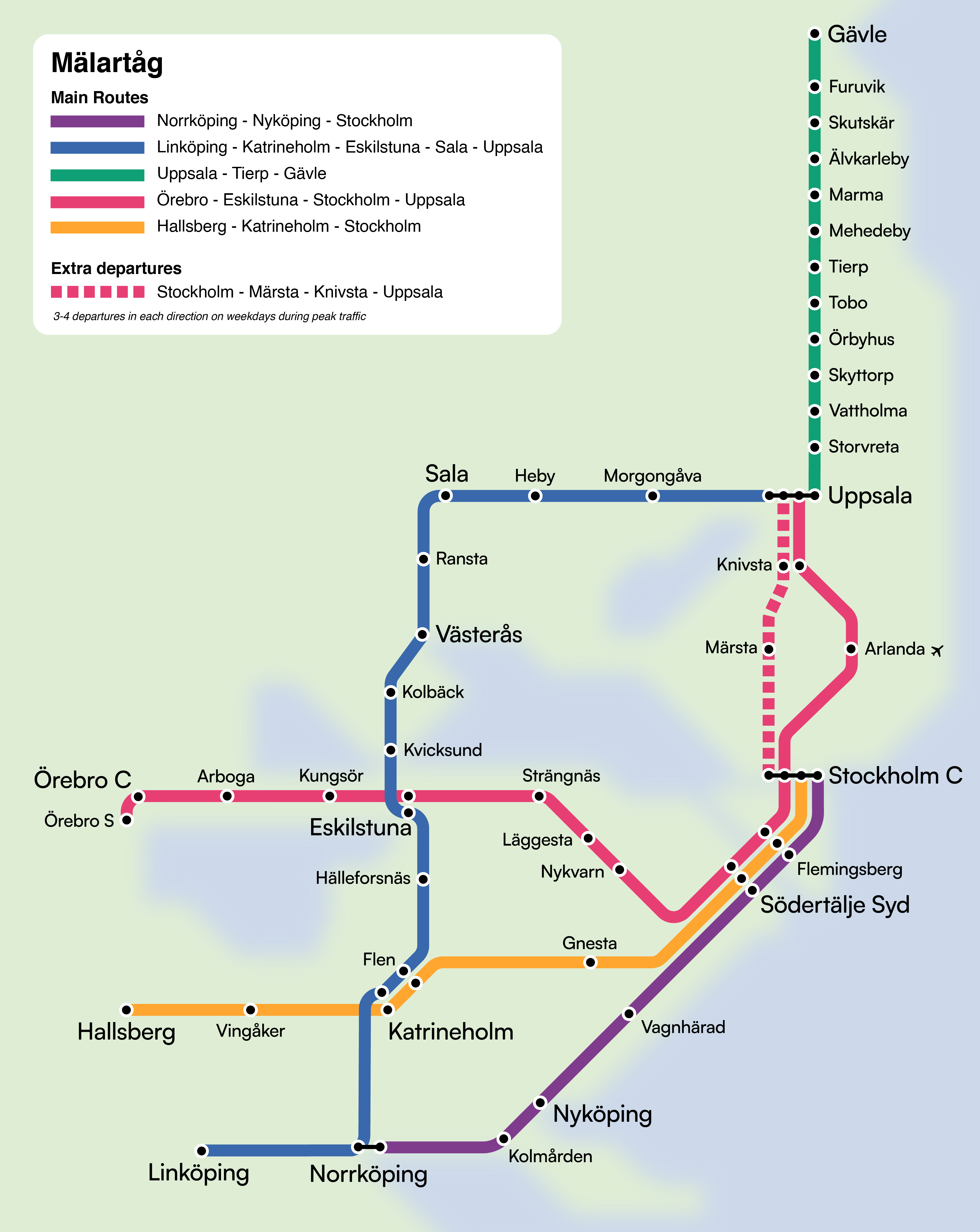
Mälartåg Route Map

Mälartåg is a Swedish regional train operator serving the Stockholm-Mälaren Region. It is managed by Mälardalstrafik, a company jointly owned by the regional public transport authorities in the Mälardalen area, including in Stockholm, Sörmland, Uppsala County, Västmanland, Örebro County, and Östergötland. The name Mälartåg means Mälaren-train in Swedish while Mälardalstrafik means Mälaren Valley transport.

Mälardalstrafik is responsible for managing and developing regional train services in these areas. Along with operating Mälartåg, the company offers Movingo, a period ticket option for commuters. Mälartåg primarily uses Stadler ER1 electric trainsets, with some routes also featuring Bombardier Regina X50 trains. Since June 2024 Mälartåg services have been run under contract by Transdev.

== Operations ==
Mälartåg operates a regional train network consisting of five lines, covering a total length of 1,060 km and serving 44 stations. The network connects Stockholm with major cities in the wider region, including Linköping, Uppsala, and Örebro, as well as serving Stockholm Arlanda Airport. Mälartåg carries approximately 12.5 million passengers annually.

The lines operated by Mälartåg are:

- Norrköping – Nyköping – Stockholm
- Linköping – Katrineholm – Eskilstuna – Sala – Uppsala
- Uppsala – Tierp – Gävle
- Örebro – Eskilstuna – Stockholm – Uppsala
- Hallsberg – Katrineholm – Stockholm
- Stockholm – Märsta – Knivsta – Uppsala* *3–4 departures in each direction on weekdays during peak times only

== History ==
=== Predecessor ===
Mälartåg originated from the establishment of Tåg i Mälardalen AB in 1991, which aimed to investigate the feasibility of a unified management system for train traffic in the Mälardalen region. In 1995, the company signed an agreement with SJ (Swedish State Railways) to operate regional train services in the area, leading to the formation of Trafik i Mälardalen AB. This partnership was jointly owned by SJ and Mälardalstrafik MÄLAB AB, each holding 50% of the company.

Trafik i Mälardalen facilitated ticketing and operational coordination, allowing tickets to be used on SJ's Regional and InterCity trains across various routes, including Linköping, Norrköping, Stockholm, and Uppsala. The Trafik i Mälardalen collaboration ended on 30 September 2017.

=== Establishment ===
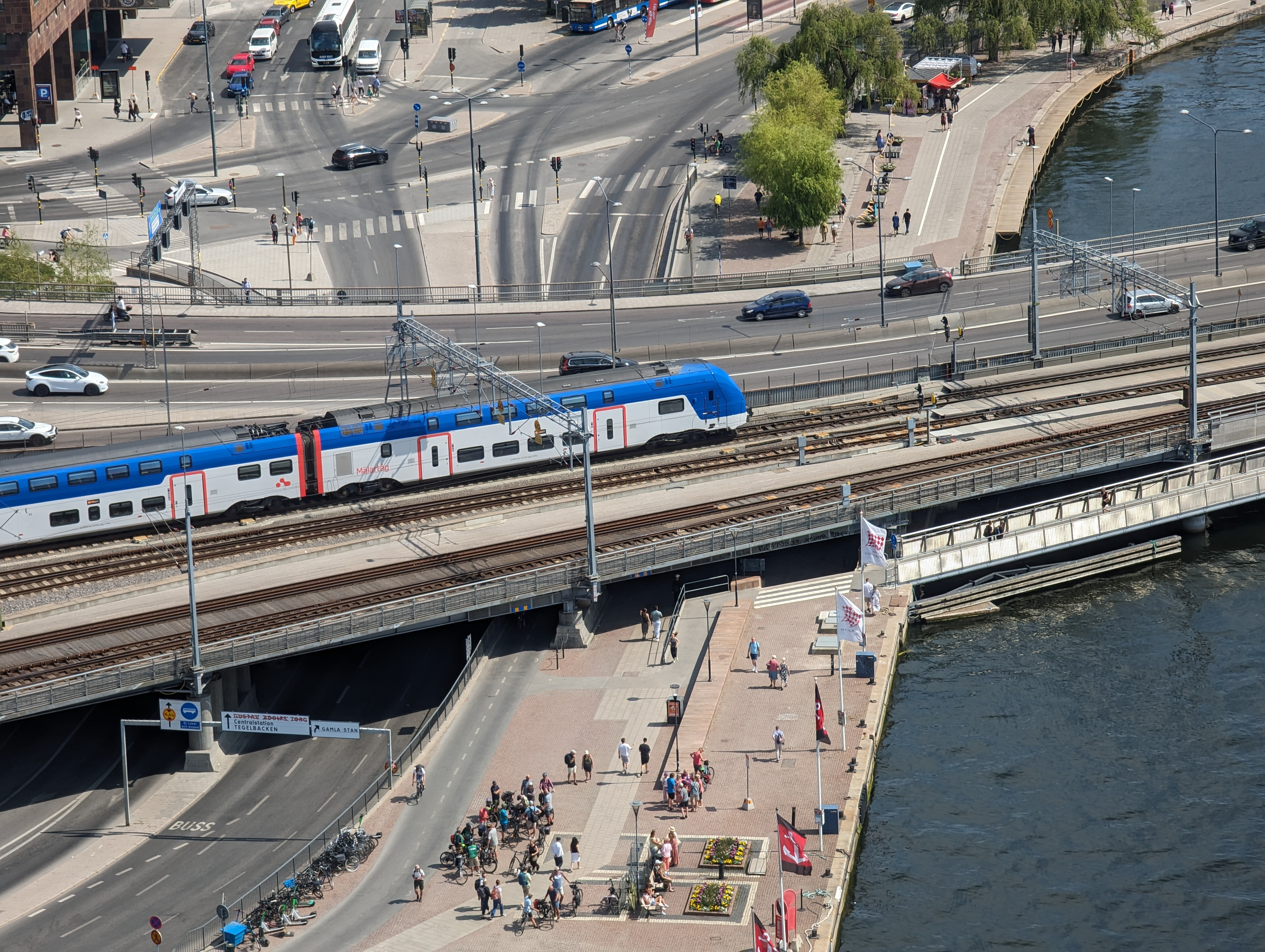
A Mälartåg train leaving Stockholm Central Station

In December 2013, six public transport authorities in Mälardalen had already reached an agreement to develop train services in eastern Sweden. However, the project faced challenges when SJ opposed it, leading to a temporary halt in progress. After resolving legal issues, the authorities moved forward with their plans.

In June 2014, a decision was made to increase train traffic in the Mälardalen region by approximately 30%. This expansion aimed to enhance connectivity between Stockholm and surrounding areas, and involved plans to acquire additional trains. The initiative was supported by regional authorities. As part of the expansion, it was announced in February 2017 that Mälardalstrafik had ordered 33 new double-decker trains from the Swiss manufacturer Stadler. These trains were designed for operation on key routes in the Mälardalen region and were delivered from 2018.

The decision to expand services led to the introduction of Mälartåg, which began operations in conjunction with the Movingo period ticket launched on 30 September 2017. The Movingo ticket facilitated unlimited travel on SJ's regional trains and local public transport within the counties of Stockholm, Sörmland, Västmanland, Uppsala, Örebro, and Östergötland.

== Contract operators ==
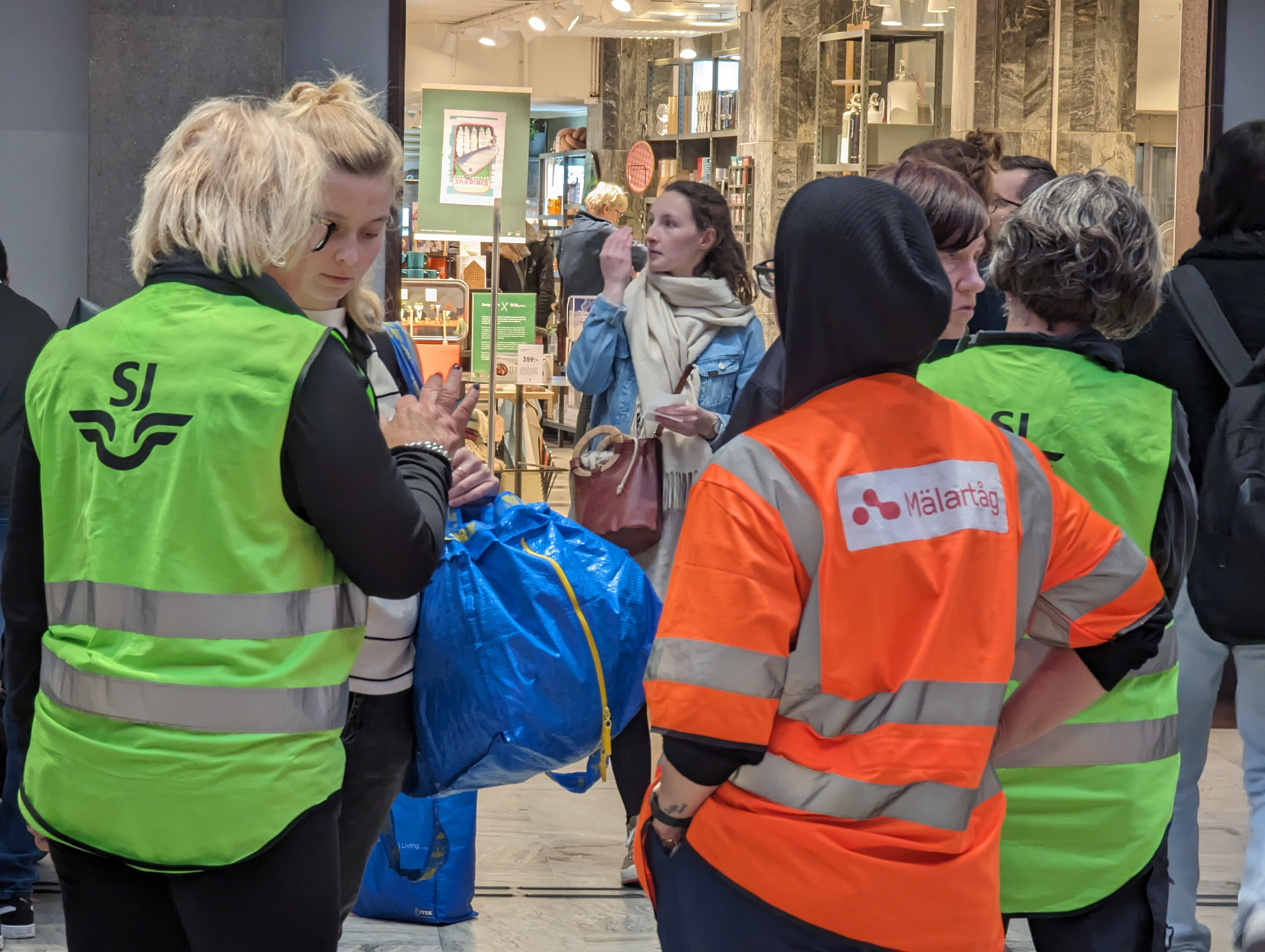
SJ and Mälartåg staff at Stockholm Central Station

Mälartåg is operated using a contract model, with Mälardalstrafik responsible for setting fares and service levels in collaboration with its six owner regions, as well as procuring rolling stock. Operations are tendered to a contracted operator, who delivers services based on these agreements. Mälardalstrafik itself employs 28 staff members, while the contracted operator is responsible for operational staff.

=== SJ (2017–2021) ===
Mälardalstrafik had a contract with SJ for regional train services from 2017 to 2021. During this period, SJ operated trains using its existing fleet, which included locomotive-hauled passenger coaches and electric multiple units. As the contract progressed, Mälardalstrafik transitioned to using its own new rolling stock.

=== MTR (2021-2024) ===
In December 2020, MTR Corporation was awarded the Mälartåg operating contract, which commenced on 12 December 2021. This contract was initially set to run until December 2029, with the option for a one-year extension. However, MTR faced significant challenges in establishing sustainable operations. On 22 February 2024, MTR announced the early termination of the Mälartåg contract.

=== Transdev (2024–2026) ===
In February 2024, it was announced that Transdev would take over responsibility for Mälartåg services starting on 16 June 2024. This new contract, structured as a temporary 'emergency agreement', will last for two years and cover all of Mälartåg's services. The contract handover also involved the 700 Mälartåg employees from MTR, who were moved to Transdev.

On 10 October 2025, it was announced that VR Group will start driving for Mälartåg from December 2026.

== Rolling stock ==
Mälartåg operates two types of trains, both trains are owned by Transitio AB, a company jointly owned by several Swedish regions, and leased to Mälardalstrafik.

=== ER1 ===
Mälartåg's fleet primarily consists of Stadler DOSTO four-car double-deck electric multiple units, designated as ER1. The trains are a variant of the Stadler KISS series, adapted for the Swedish climate and loading gauge. They are capable of operating at −40 °C with up to 800mm of snow on the tracks. Features include inter-vehicle gangways with insulated twin bellows, large snowploughs, and underframes are designed to minimise freezing. The first ER1 trains entered service on 15 December 2019, initially on the Arboga–Eskilstuna–Stockholm line. As of 2024, Mälardalstrafik operates a total of 53 ER1 double-decker trains.

ER1 Specifications
Manufacturer	Stadler Rail AG
Maximum speed	200 km/h
Total length	104.81 meters
Body width	292 cm
Maximum axle load	20.9 tonnes
Empty weight	232 tonnes
Seating capacity	333 fixed seats, 24 folding chairs

The acquisition of these trains occurred in several phases:

- In June 2016, a total of 33 ER1 units were ordered from Stadler for Mälardalstrafik.
- In June 2020, an additional order for 12 units was placed, utilising an option from the 2016 contract, which was valued at 133.3 million Swiss francs.
- Following the integration of Upptåget into Mälartåg on 12 June 2022, 8 more ER1 units were added to the fleet.
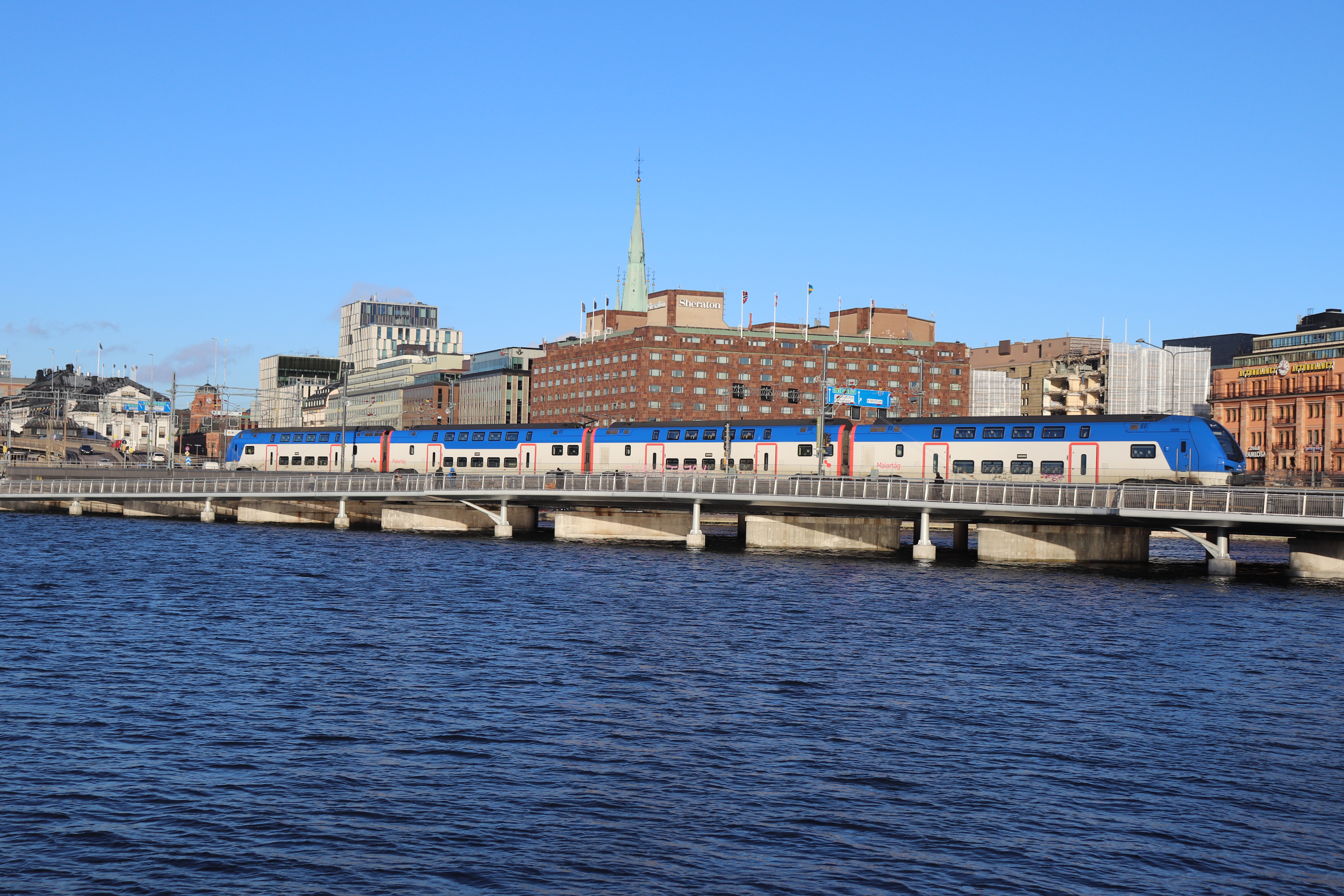
An ER1 Train in Stockholm

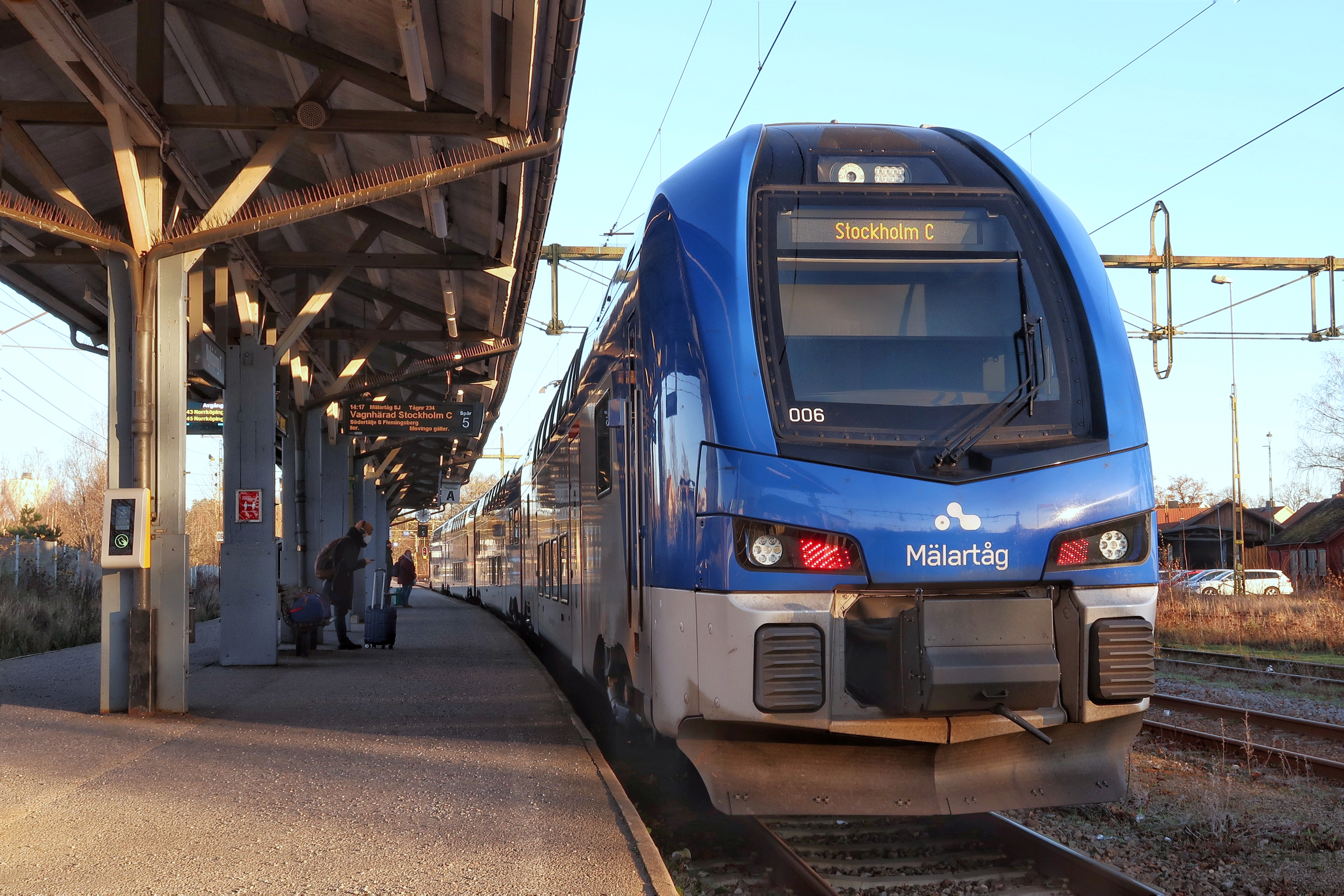
An ER1 Train at Nyköping Station

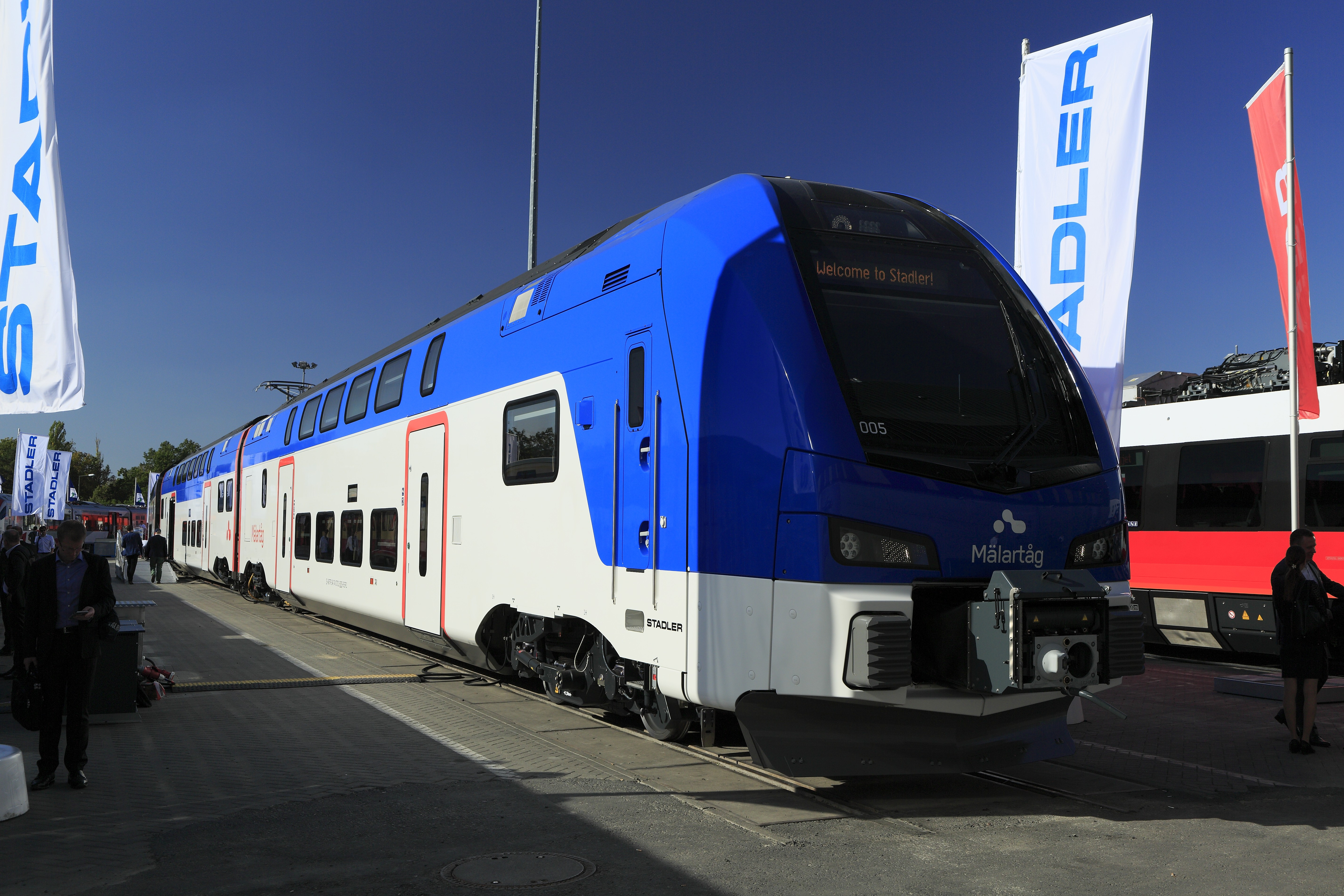
ER1 unit Displayed at InnoTrans Berlin in 2018

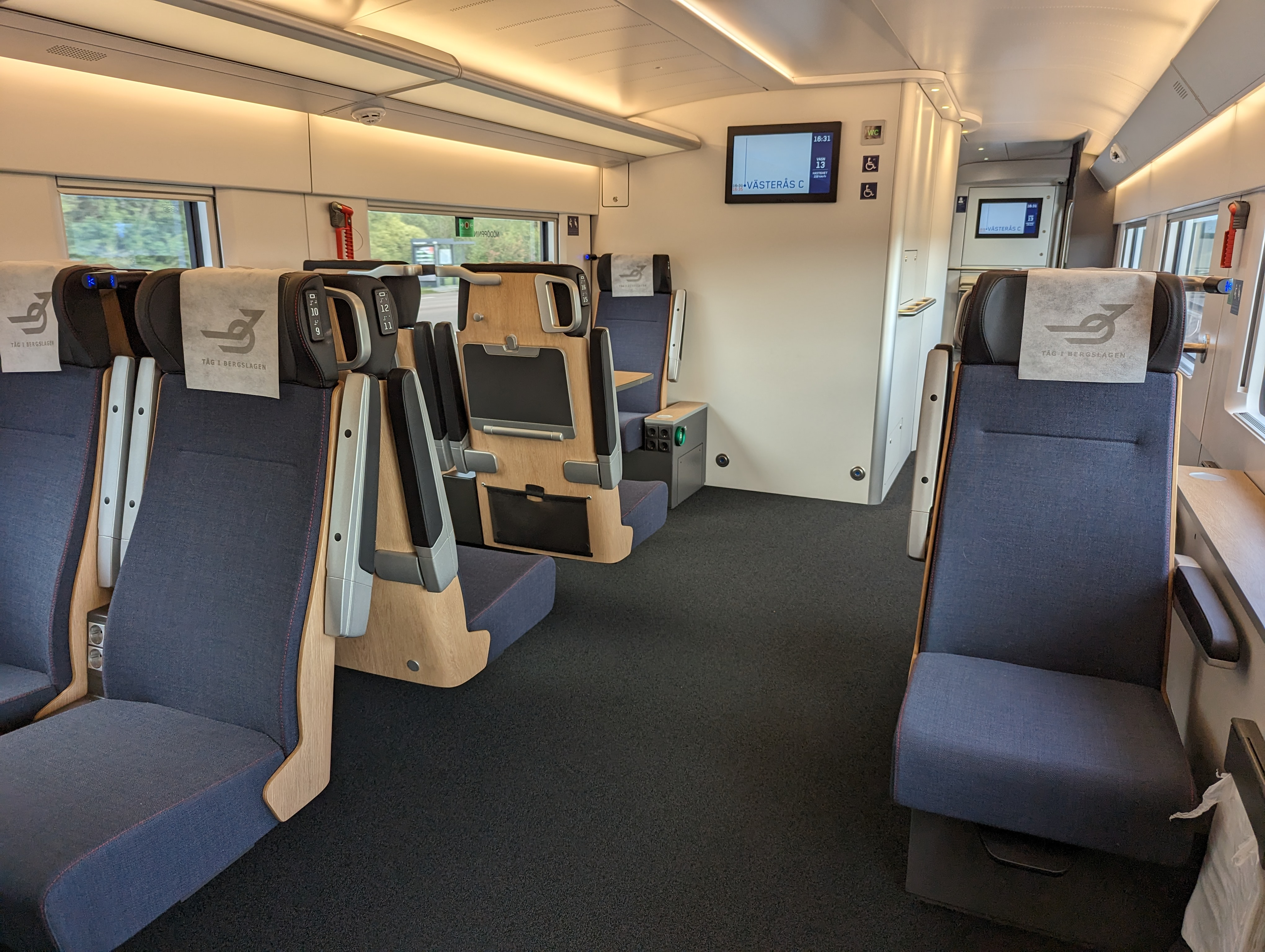
ER1 Interior

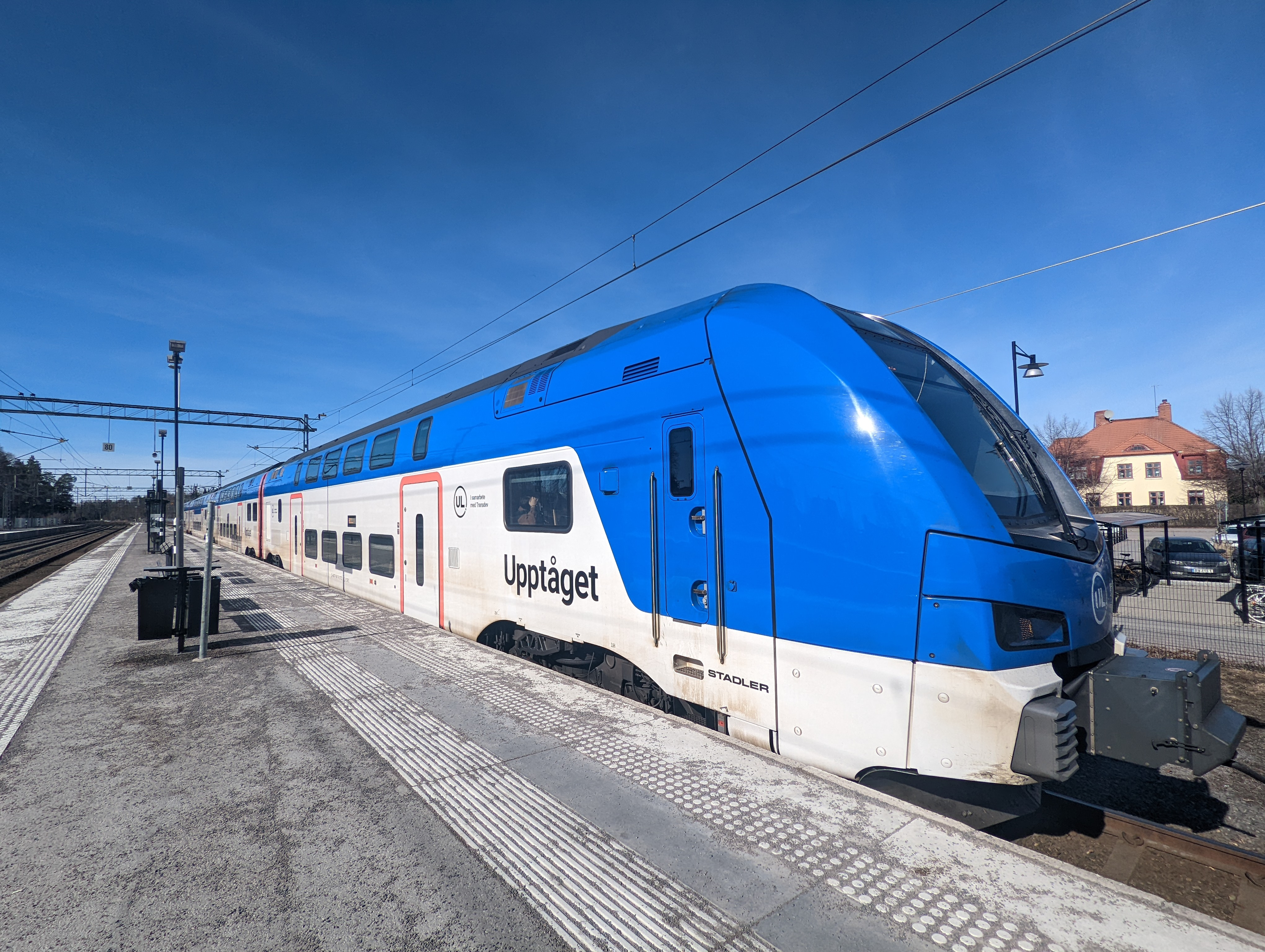
ER1 unit in former Upptåget branding

=== X50 & X52 ===
In addition to the primary ER1 units, Mälartåg's fleet includes nine Regina trains (classes X50 and X52) from the early 2000s, which are used mainly on the Eskilstuna – Västerås – Sala - Uppsala line. These were acquired from the Upptåget integration in June 2022, and repainted to Mälartåg livery.

X50 Specifications
Manufacturer	Bombardier Transportation
Maximum speed	200 km/h
Maximum axle load	18.5 tonnes
Seating capacity	170–195 fixed seats,19–29 folding chairs

A Regina train with the Mälartåg livery at Heby Station

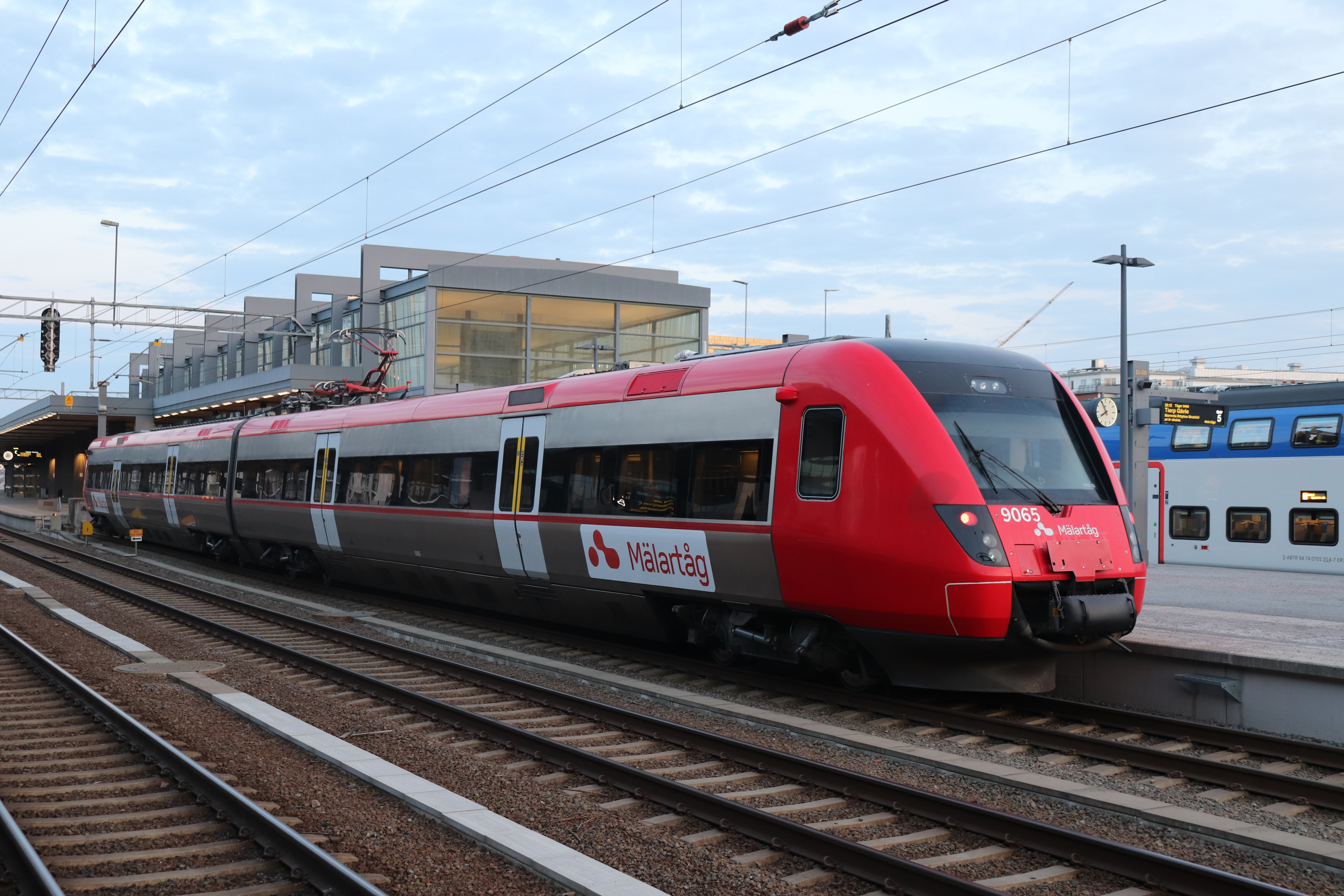
A Regina train before repainting to Mälartåg livery

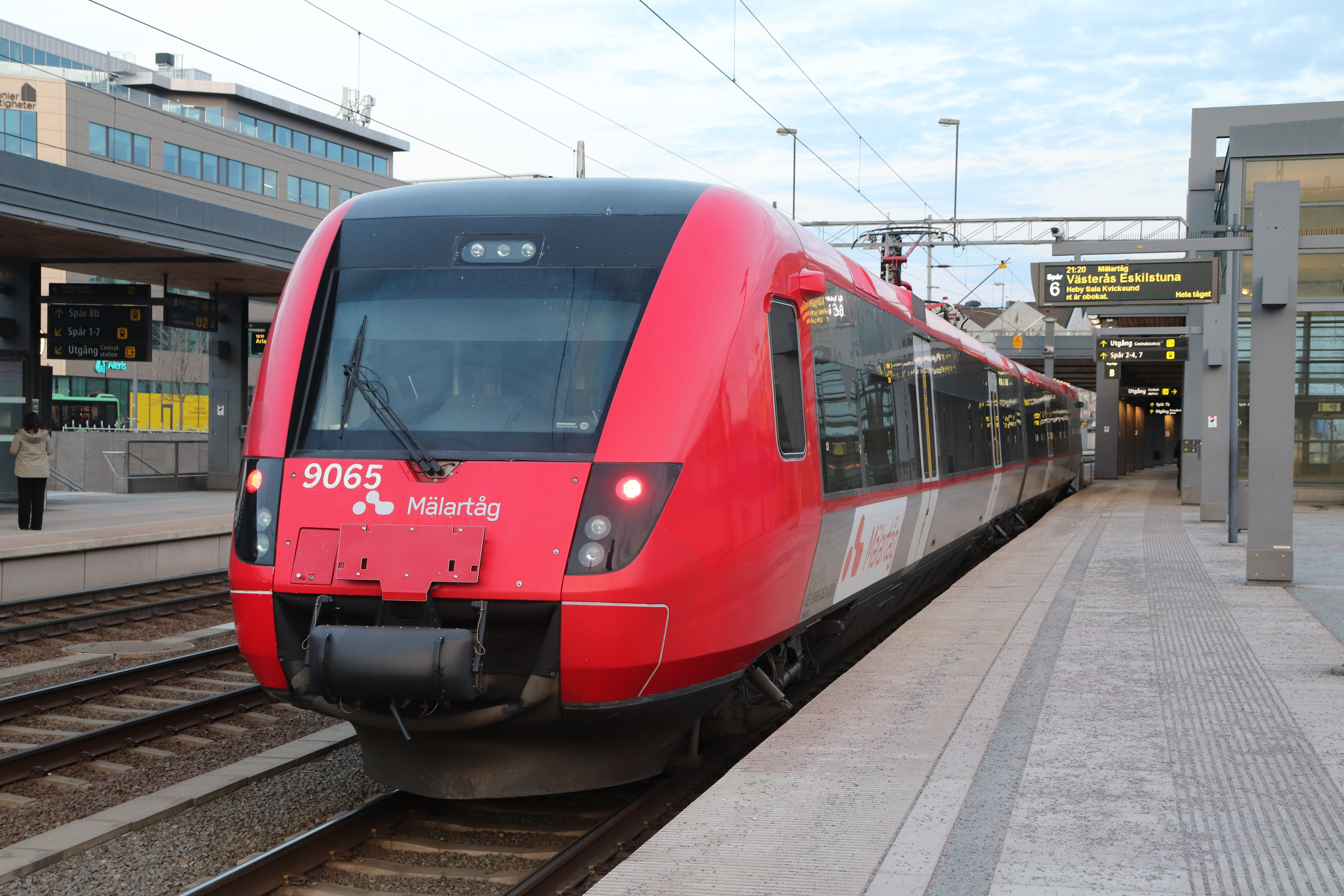
A Regina train before repainting to Mälartåg livery

== See also ==
- Rail transport in Sweden
- SL Stockholm
- Transitio
- SJ
