= Northern Main Line =

Railway line in Sweden

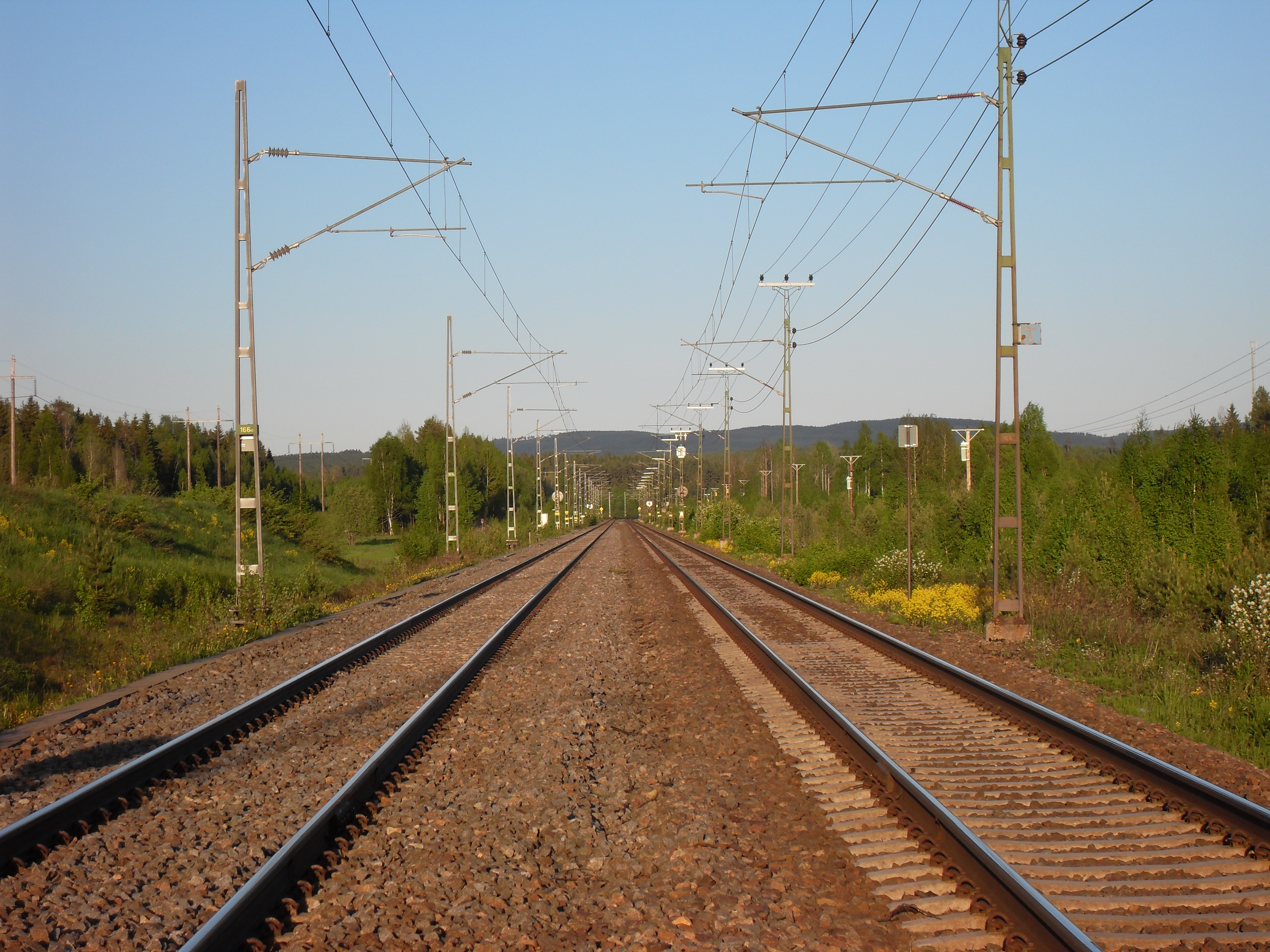
- Northern Main Line, railway line in Sweden

Overview
- Owner: Swedish state
- Termini: Gävle-Storvik; Ånge

History
- Opened: 1881

The Northern Main Line (Swedish: Norra stambanan) is a 268-kilometre (167 mi) long electrified railway in Sweden, between Gävle or Storvik and Ånge. The railway consists of single track except the parts between Mo grindar and Holmsveden, Kilafors and Bollnäs, and Ramsjö and Ovansjö, a total of 91 kilometres (57 mi) double track.

The railway passes Gävle or Storvik, Ockelbo, Ljusdal and Ånge.
