= Hallsberg railway station =

Railway station in Hallsberg, Sweden

Hallsberg
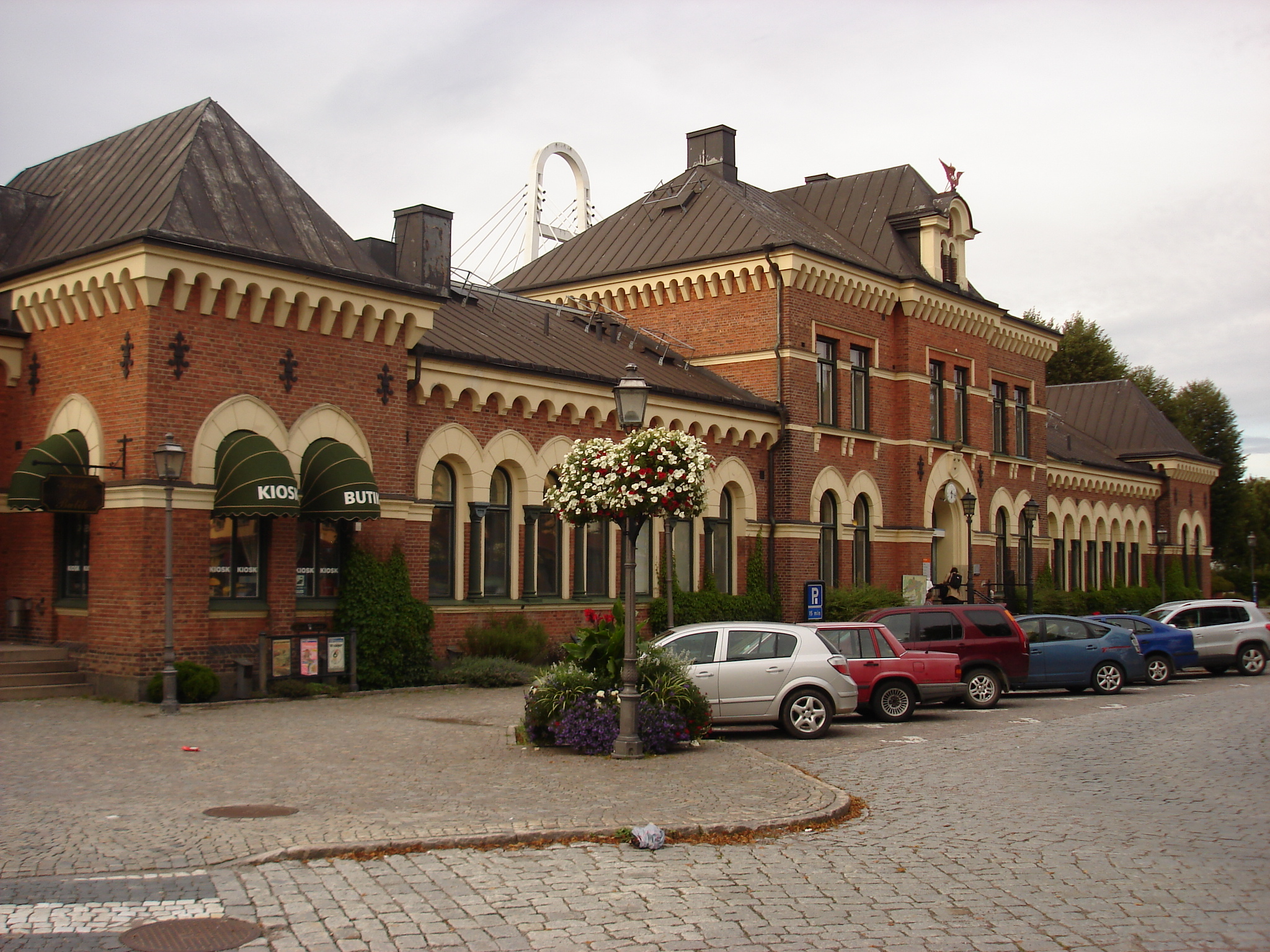
- Station building

General information
- Location: Hallsberg Municipality; Sweden
- Coordinates: 59°4′1″N 15°6′39″E
- Elevation: 53 m (174 ft)
- Owner: Jernhusen (station infrastructure); Trafikverket (rail infrastructure)
- Line: Göteborg-Stockholm
- Platforms: 2
- Tracks: 4
- Train operators: SJ

History
- Opened: 1862; 164 years ago

Services
Preceding station	SJ	Following station
Kumla towards Stockholm C via Örebro C	Mälaren Line and Western Main Line	Laxå towards Göteborg C
Katrineholm C towards Stockholm C	Värmland Line	Degerfors towards Oslo
Preceding station	Long distance trains	Following station
Katrineholm C towards Stockholm C	Tågab	Degerfors towards Karlstad C
Preceding station	Regional trains	Following station
Kumla towards Gävle C	Tåg i Bergslagen	Motala towards Mjölby
Vingåker towards Stockholm C	Mälartåg	Terminus
Preceding station	Västtågen	Following station
Kumla towards Örebro C	Gothenburg-Lidköping-Mariestad-Örebro Line	Laxå towards Göteborg C
Location

Hallsberg railway station is located in the small town of Hallsberg, Sweden, at the intersection of the Western Main Line and the Bergslagen Freight Corridor. Some fast long-distance trains stop here, and also regional trains in multiple directions. The station is located at the traditional midpoint of the town. Regional buses stop nearby (there are no city buses).

Hallsberg has Scandinavia's largest rail freight yard.

== History ==
Railway traffic started in 1862 when the Western Main Line between the two largest cities of Sweden opened for traffic reached the place, with traffic all the way same year. In same year the railway towards Örebro started traffic. The southbound railway towards Mjölby started traffic in 1873.

The station building is originally from 1862 but has been added to a few times, especially 1895.

Hallsberg is a railway town, created based on its location at a railway junction. The present town location was countryside before the railway construction.
