= Degerfors railway station =

Railway station in Sweden

Degerfors
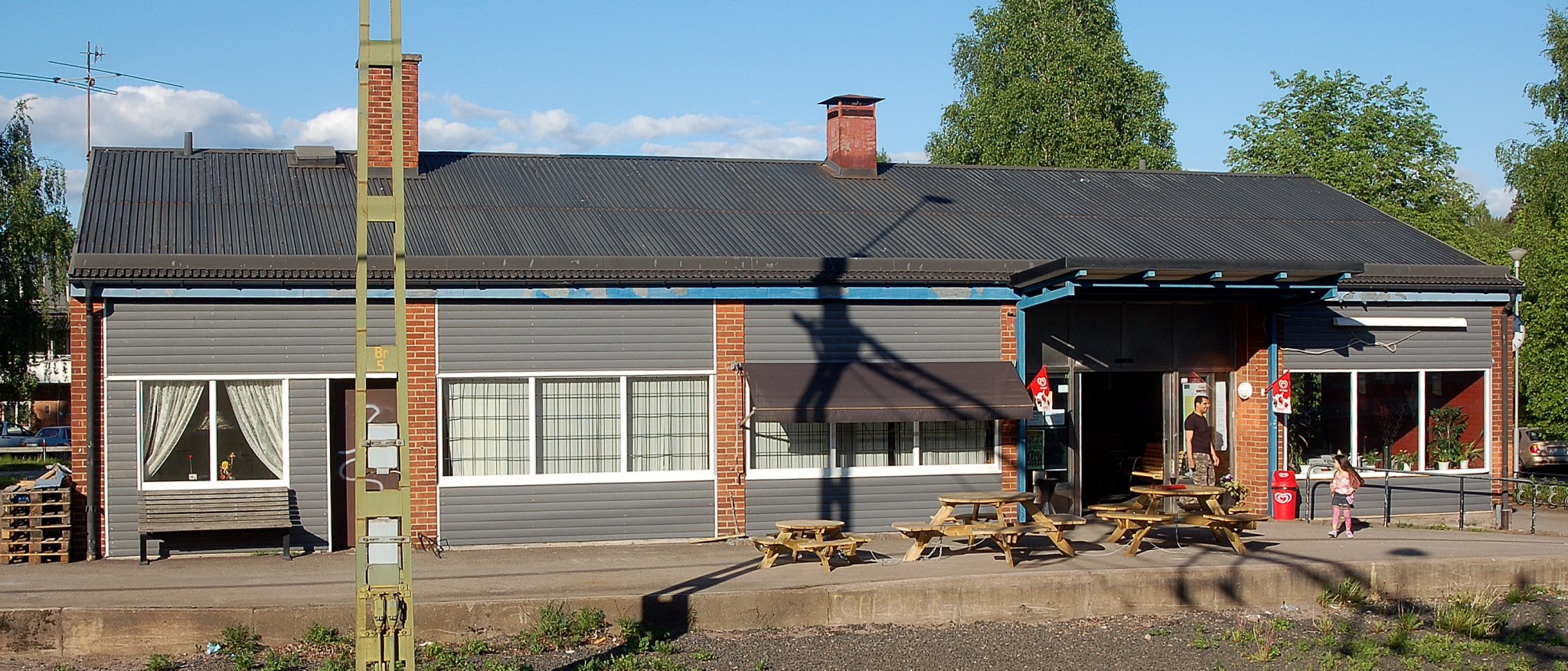
- Degerfors station building

General information
- Location: Degerfors, Degerfors Municipality; Sweden
- Coordinates: 59°13′45″N 14°26′26″E
- Operator: Trafikverket
- Line: Värmland Line
- Tracks: 2
- Train operators: SJ AB

Other information
- Station code: Dg

History
- Opened: 1866

Services
Preceding station	SJ	Following station
Kristinehamn towards Oslo	Värmland Line	Hallsberg towards Stockholm C
Preceding station	Regional trains	Following station
Kristinehamn towards Charlottenberg	Värmlandstrafik	Terminus
Preceding station	Long distance trains	Following station
Kristinehamn towards Karlstad Central	Tågab	Hallsberg towards Stockholm Central
Location

Degerfors railway station (Swedish: Degerfors järnvägsstation) is a railway station in Degerfors, Sweden.

The station opened in 1866.

== See also ==
- Rail transport in Sweden
