= Kristinehamn railway station =

Railway station in Sweden

Kristinehamn
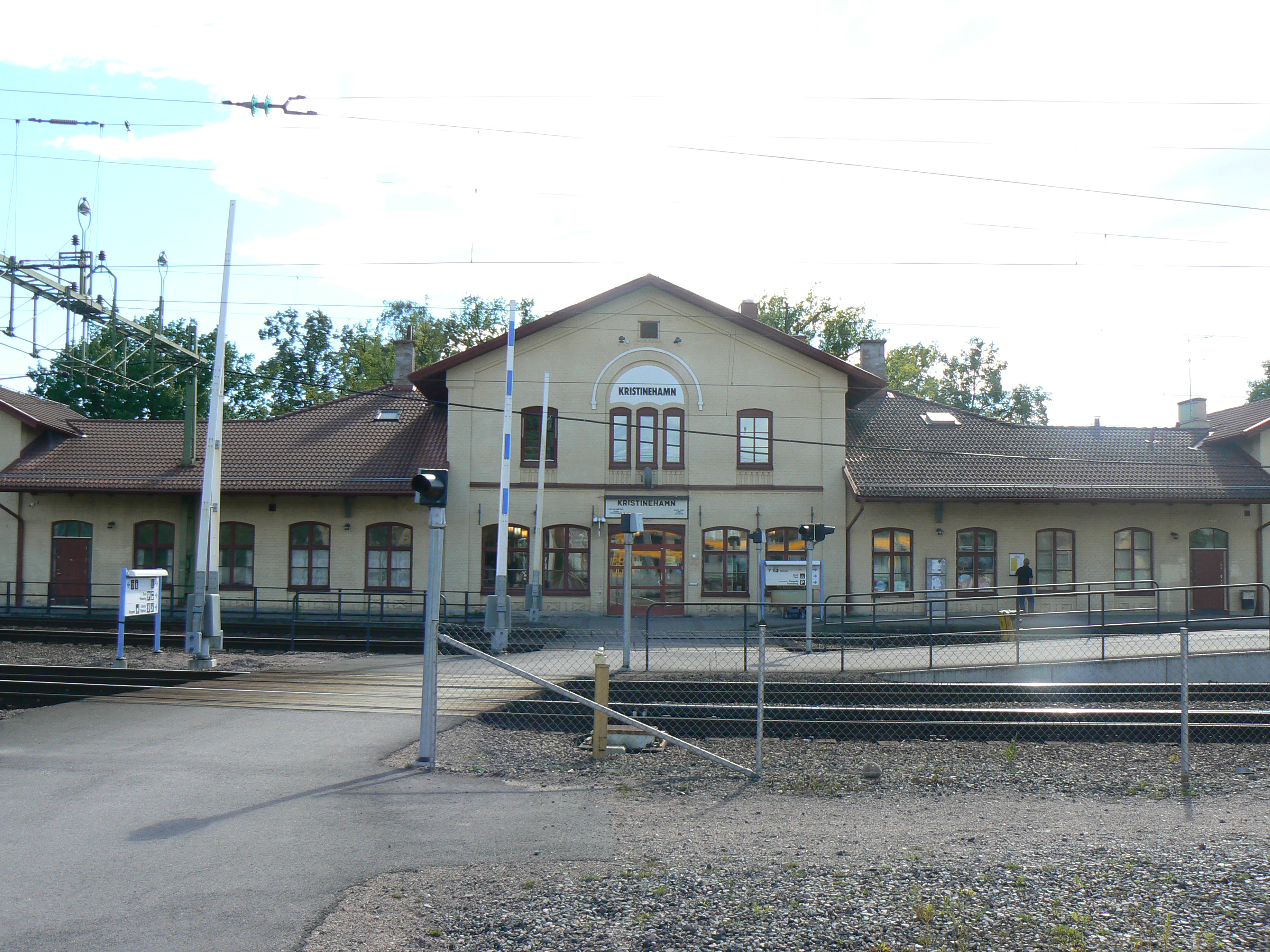
- Kristinehamn station building

General information
- Location: Kristinehamn, Kristinehamn Municipality; Sweden
- Coordinates: 59.3165°N 14.1084°E
- Lines: Värmland Line; Inland Line
- Tracks: 5
- Train operators: SJ AB

Other information
- Station code: Khn

History
- Opened: 1866

Services
Preceding station	SJ	Following station
Karlstad C towards Oslo	Värmland Line	Degerfors towards Stockholm C
Preceding station	Regional trains	Following station
Väse towards Charlottenberg	Värmlandstrafik	Degerfors Terminus
Preceding station	Long distance trains	Following station
Karlstad Central Terminus	Tågab	Degerfors towards Stockholm Central
Location

Kristinehamn railway station (Swedish: Kristinehamn station) is a railway station in Kristinehamn, Sweden.

The station opened in 1866.

== See also ==
- Rail transport in Sweden
