= Karlstad Central Station =

Railway station in Karlstad, Sweden

Karlstad C
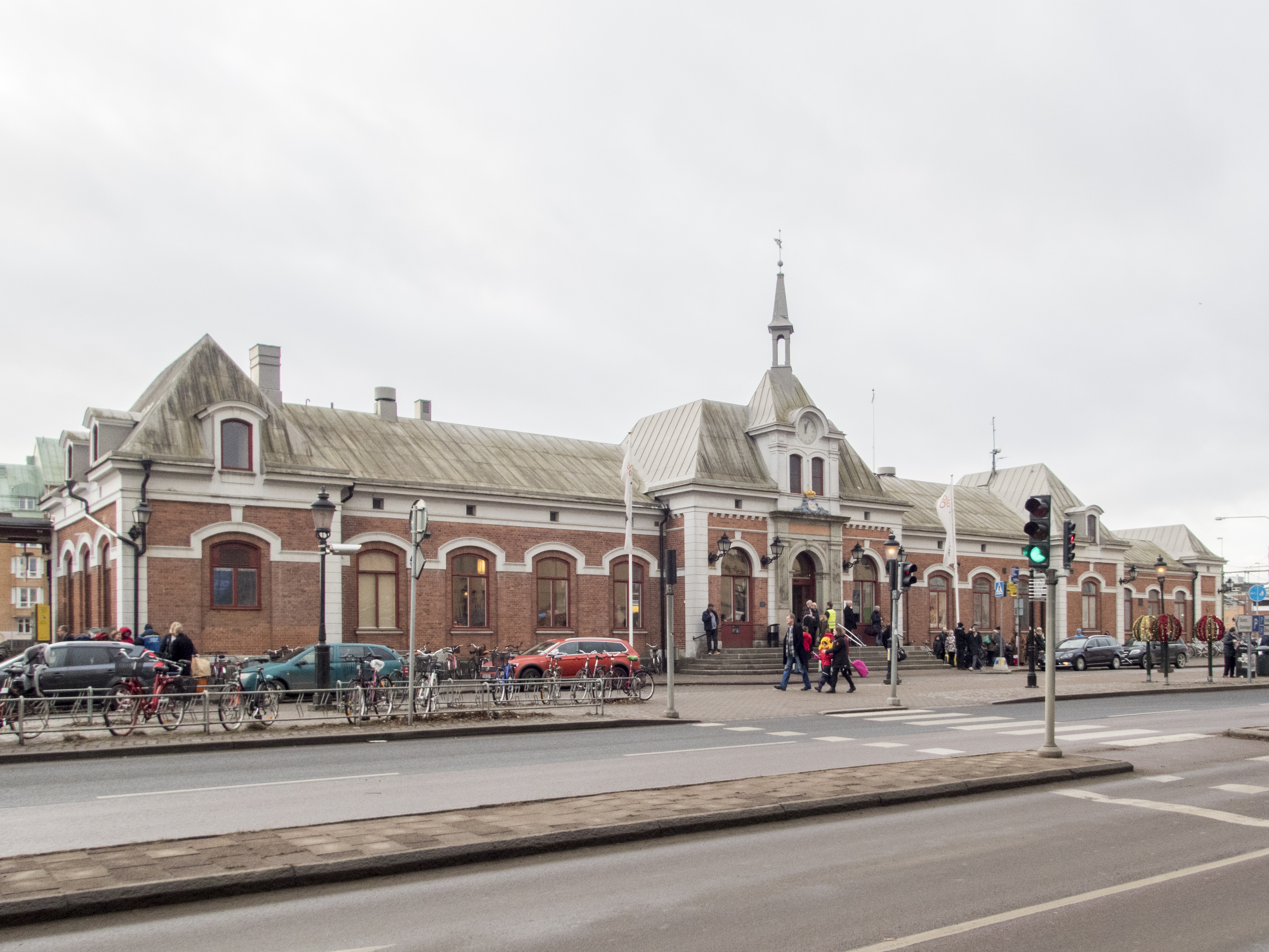
- Station building

General information
- Location: Karlstad Municipality; Sweden
- Coordinates: 59°22′40″N 13°29′57″E
- Elevation: 48 m (157 ft)
- Owner: Jernhusen (station infrastructure); Trafikverket (rail infrastructure)
- Line: Laxå-Charlottenberg (-Oslo)
- Platforms: 2
- Tracks: 4
- Train operators: SJ

History
- Opened: 1869; 157 years ago

Services
Preceding station	SJ	Following station
Arvika towards Oslo	Värmland Line	Kristinehamn towards Stockholm C
Kil towards Göteborg C	Vänern Line	Terminus
Preceding station	Long distance trains	Following station
Terminus	Tågab	Kristinehamn towards Stockholm C
Preceding station	Regional trains	Following station
Kil towards Charlottenberg	Värmlandstrafik	Välsviken towards Degerfors
Kil towards Torsby	Värmlandstrafik	Terminus
Location

Karlstad Central Station (Swedish: Karlstads centralstation) is located in Karlstad, Sweden, along the Värmland Line. The station is located around 300 metres (980 ft) from traditional midpoint of the city. City buses and some regional buses stop at the station, while the regional bus station is around 400 metres (1,300 ft) away from the railway station.

== Trains ==
Intercity trains operated by SJ and Tågab and regional trains belonging to Värmlandstrafik stop here.

== History ==
Railway traffic started in Karlstad in 1869 with railway access from Stockholm, and in 1871 the main line between Oslo and Stockholm started traffic all the way.

Another line existed between 1904 and 1979, the narrow gauge Nordmark-Klarälvens Järnvägar between Karlstad and Hagfors over Deje, with extension in 1915 to Skoghall, a line which still exists for freight traffic, now with standard gauge.

The station building is from year 1869.

In 2024-2025 a new middle platform is being built which gives two more tracks for stopping passenger trains, including a new pedestrian tunnel between the both sides of the railway.
