= SJ B1 =

Class of Swedish rail passenger car

B1
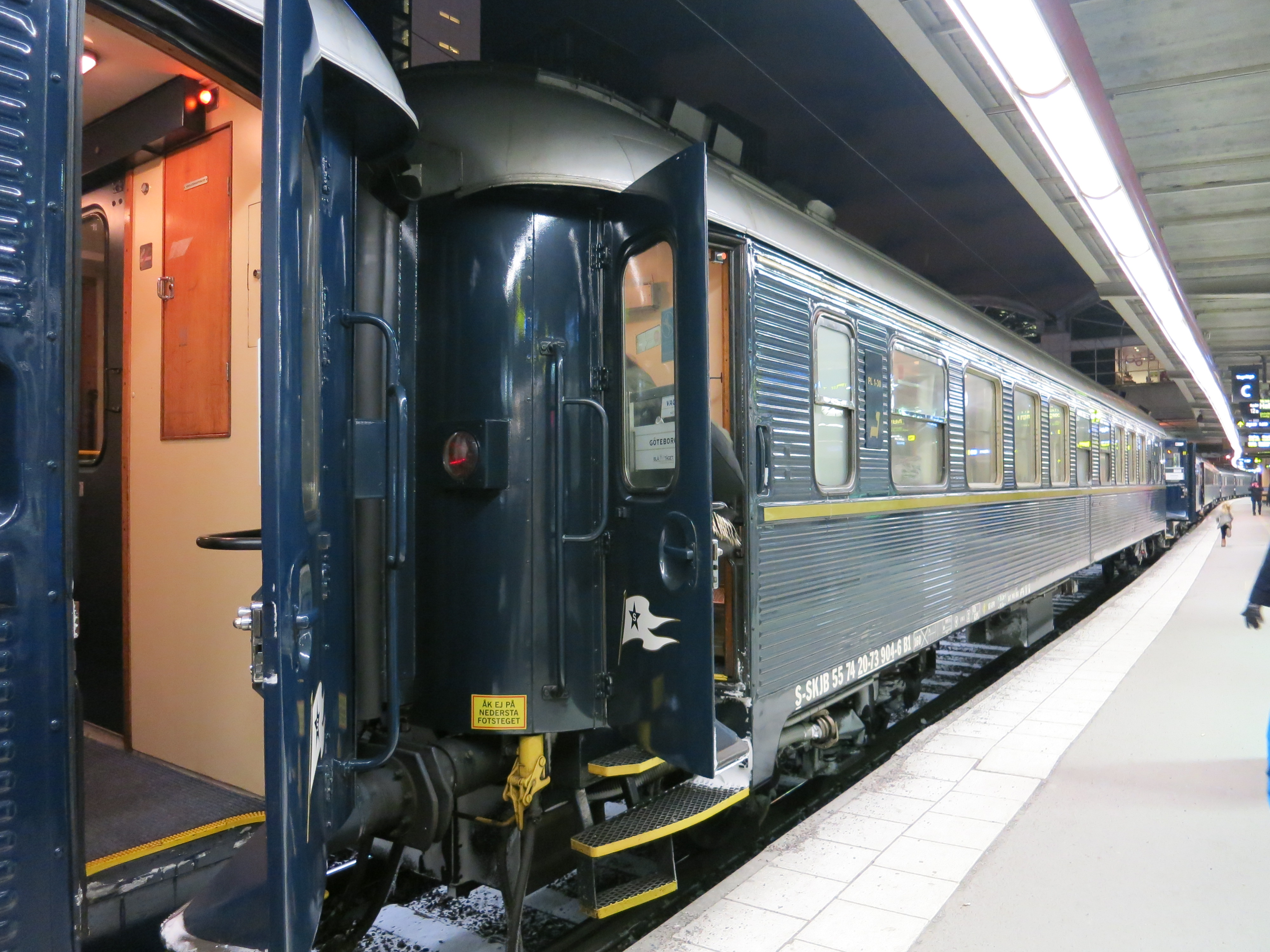
- In service: 1960–present
- Manufacturer: Kalmar Verkstad
- Family name: 1960s-cars
- Constructed: 1960–1968
- Entered service: 1960
- Refurbished: 1985–1989
- Number built: 100
- Number in service: 8
- Number scrapped: ~90
- Capacity: 62
- Operators: TÅGAB, Transdev, SkJB SJ(former)

Specifications
- Car length: 24,10 m
- Width: 3,14 m
- Height: 4,07 m
- Maximum speed: 160 km/h (99 mph)
- Weight: 40–45 tons depending on version
- Track gauge: 1,435 mm (4 ft 8 1/2 in) standard gauge

B1, formerly Bo1 is a Swedish second class passenger car built by Kalmar Verkstad. The carriage belongs to the 1960s-cars family and was primarily used by the Swedish state railways, SJ between 1960 and 2006. The type remains in service in Sweden with private operators, including TÅGAB and Snälltåget. A total of 8 carriages remain in service in Sweden. Some carriages were sold to the Croatian state railways after their retirement from the SJ fleet.

== Versions ==
| Class | Description | Number | Status |
|---|---|---|---|
| B1N | Modified to be used in Norway | 7 | Retired |
| B1K | Modified to be used in Denmark | 7 | Retired |
| B1KN | Modified to be used in Norway and Denmark | 11 | Retired |
| B1KT | Modified to be used in Denmark | 17 | Retired |
| B21KT | Modified to be used in Denmark and in local traffic | 1 | Reverted to B1 |
| B21U | Modified to be used in Denmark and in local traffic, with lavatories being disabled | 1 | Reverted to B1 |
