= Stockholm Central Station =

Railway station in Stockholm, Sweden

Stockholm C
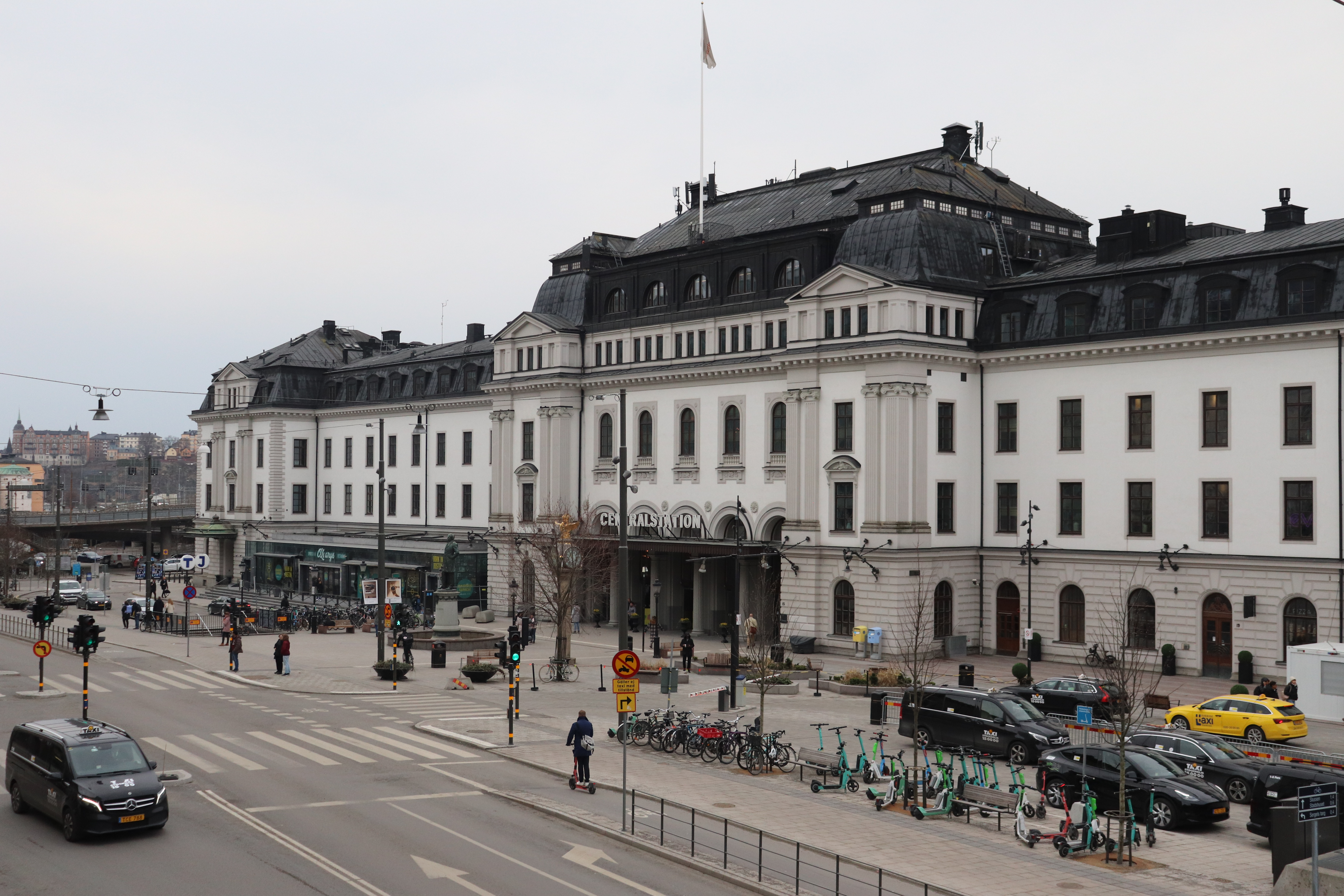
- Main building

General information
- Location: Centralplan 15; 111 20 Stockholm; Sweden
- Coordinates: 59°19′48″N 18°03′22″E
- Elevation: 3 m (9.8 ft)
- Owner: Jernhusen (station infrastructure); Trafikverket (rail infrastructure)
- Operator: SJ
- Lines: Stockholm-Uppsala; Järna-Stockholm
- Platforms: 10
- Tracks: 17

History
- Opened: 18 July 1871; 155 years ago

Services
Preceding station	SJ	Following station
Arlanda C towards Falun Central or Mora	Dala Line	Terminus
Arlanda C towards Umeå C	East Coast Line	Terminus
Arlanda C towards Duved	Northern Main Line	Terminus
Terminus	Mälaren Line and Western Main Line	Sundbyberg towards Göteborg C via Örebro C
Terminus	Southern Main Line	Södertälje syd towards Köpenhamn H
Terminus	Värmland Line	Södertälje syd towards Oslo
Terminus	Western Main Line	Södertälje syd towards Göteborg C
Terminus	Western Main Line and Älvsborg Line	Södertälje syd towards Uddevalla
Terminus	EuroNight	Norrköping C towards Hamburg Hbf or Berlin Hbf
Arlanda C towards Luleå or Narvik	Night Trains to Upper Norrland	Terminus
Preceding station	Regional trains	Following station
Terminus	Arlanda Express	Arlanda S towards Arlanda N
Arlanda C towards Uppsala C	Mälartåg	Flemingsberg towards Örebro C
Terminus	Mälartåg	Flemingsberg towards Hallsberg
Terminus	Mälartåg	Flemingsberg towards Norrköping C
Preceding station	Long distance trains	Following station
Terminus	VR	Södertälje syd towards Göteborg C
Terminus	Snälltåget	Södertälje syd towards Malmö C
Terminus	Snälltåget seasonal	Södertälje syd towards Berlin Hbf
Terminus	Tågab	Katrineholm C towards Karlstad C
Location

Stockholm Central Station (Swedish: Stockholms centralstation) or Stockholm C is the main railway station in Stockholm, and largest railway station in Sweden in terms of passenger numbers and train traffic. It is located in the Norrmalm district of central Stockholm on Vasagatan, extending from Vattugatan in the south to Kungsbron in the north. The station opened on July 18, 1871. Since 2001, the station building has been owned and managed by Jernhusen, while the platforms and tracks are overseen by the Swedish Transport Administration. The station code for Stockholm Central is Cst.

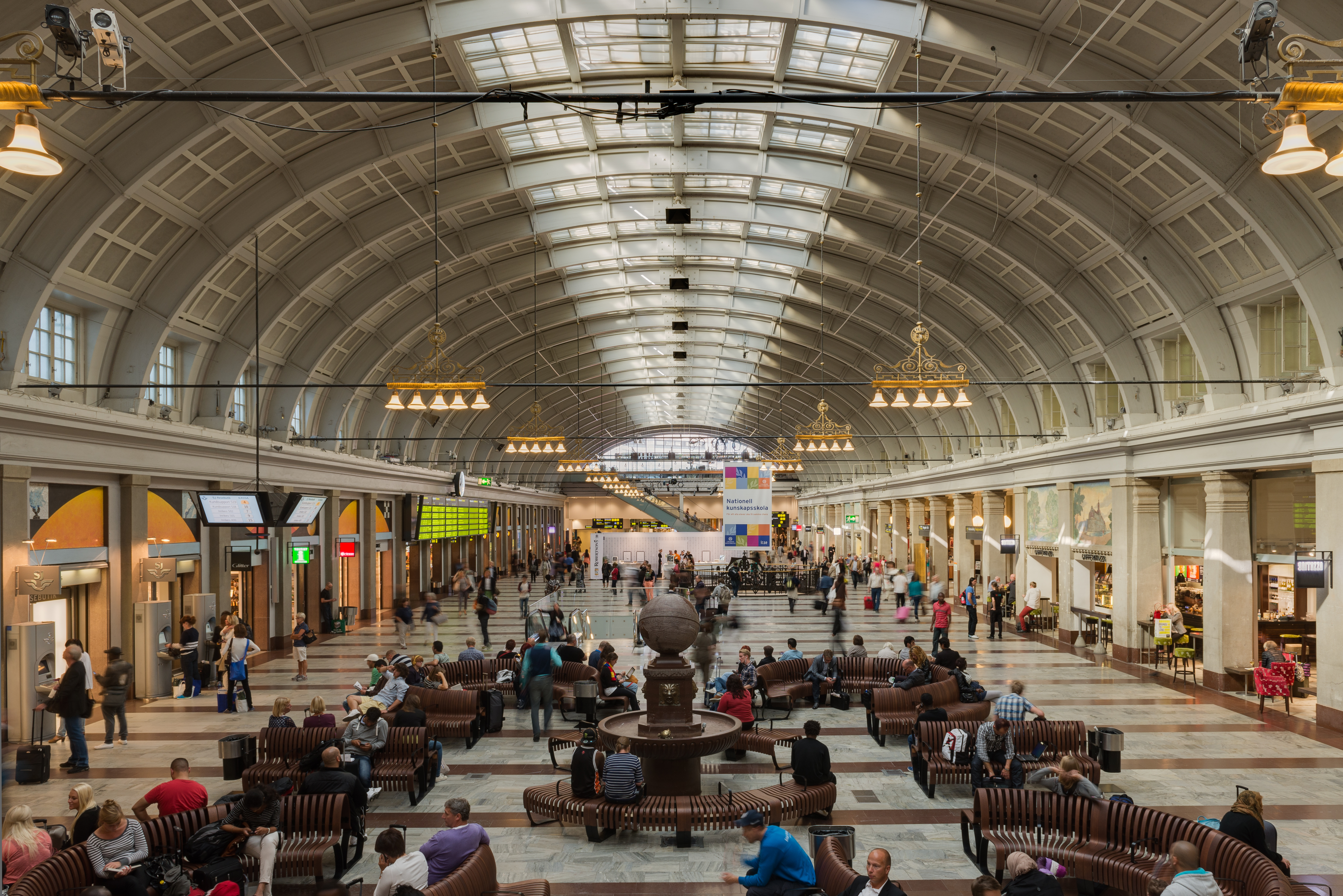
Main hall in the station house, 2013

Over the years, the station has undergone numerous renovations and expansions. The most significant changes took place between 1925 and 1928 when the large central hall, designed by architect Folke Zettervall, was added. In the mid-1950s, the station was integrated with the Stockholm Metro through a new underground passageway and concourse to T-Centralen metro station. The building has been designated as a heritage site since 1986. In 1989, Cityterminalen coach station was opened adjacent to the station.

In July 2017, the adjoining Stockholm City railway station opened, located beneath T-Centralen metro station. It took over all commuter rail operations from Stockholm Central, allowing for increased regional and long-distance train services at Central Station.

The station complex has over 200,000 visitors daily, of which about 25,000 are with Arlanda Express and 40,000 with other trains.

== History ==
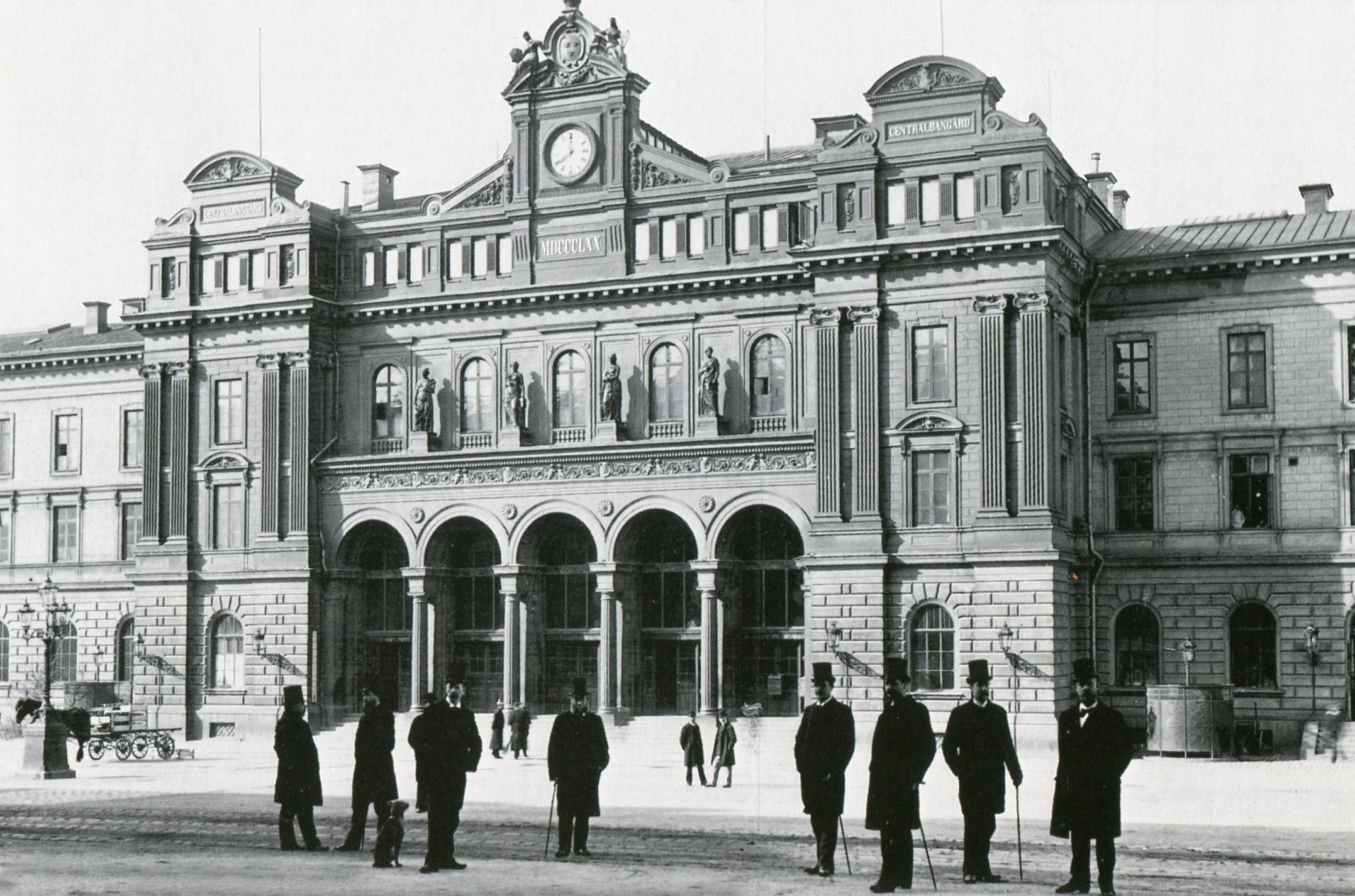
The station in 1890

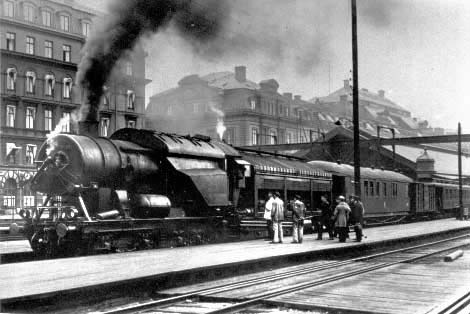
Ljungström locomotive at Stockholm Central Station (1922).

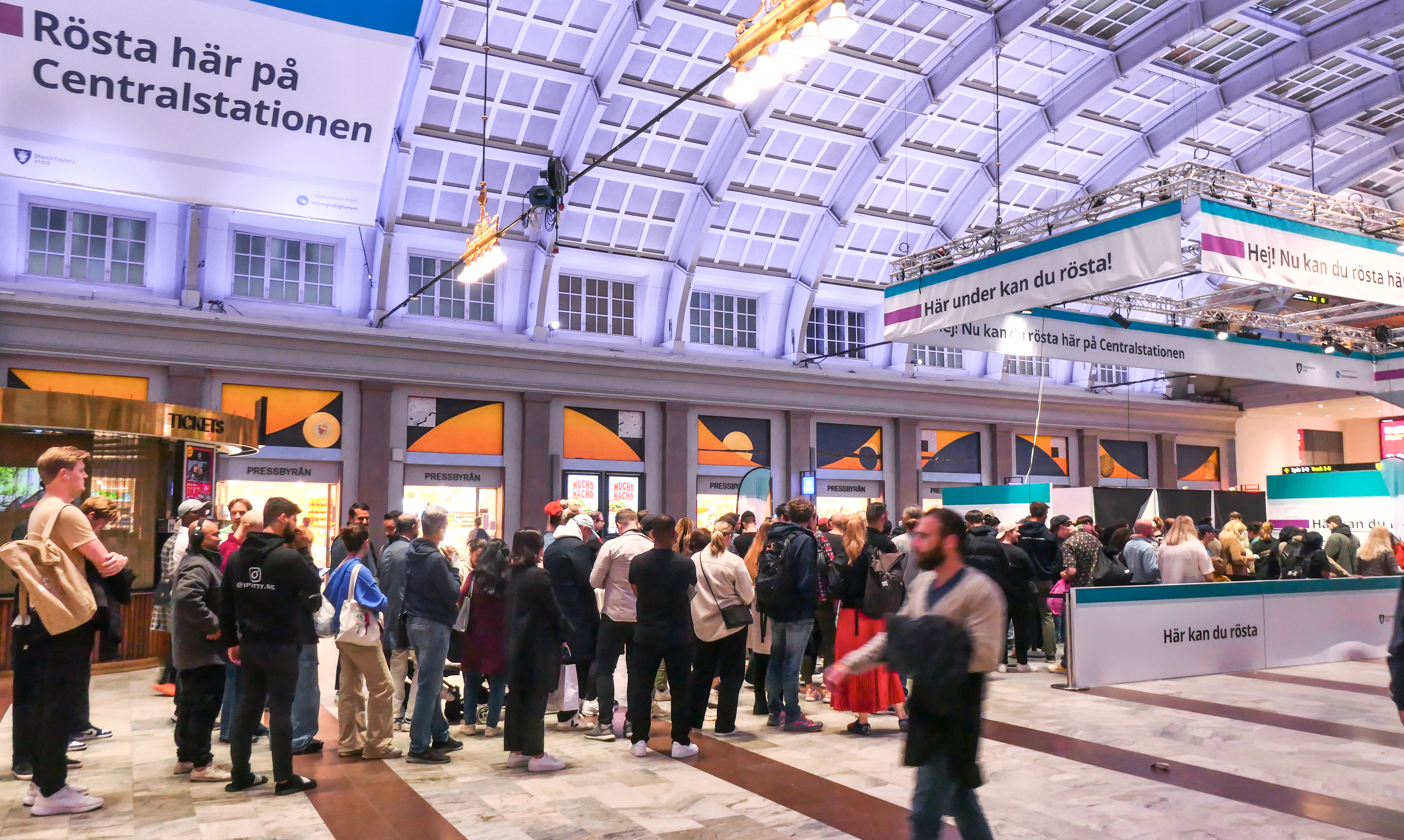
People at the station queue to vote in the 2022 Swedish general election.

The station was built between 1867 and 1871 with Adolf W. Edelsvärd as the architect. Until 1925 the tracks led into the station but during a renovation 1925–1927 the tracks were moved to the west and the former track hall was converted into a 119-meter (390 ft) long, 28-meter (92 ft) wide, and 13-meter (43 ft) high waiting hall. During the renovation the station was extended to the south through the construction of the southern pavilion. This part of the station currently houses a conference facility. Next to the conference facility is the royal waiting hall where the royal family waits when travelling by train.

In 1951 the facade towards Vasagatan was changed and given a more simplified look. In 1958 an underground passage to T-Centralen metro station was opened. In 2017, the commuter trains moved to a separate station, Stockholm City railway station, one kilometre (0.62 mi) away.

In 2011 Jernhusen, a real estate company in Stockholm, found a way to channel the body heat from the hordes of commuters passing through Stockholm's Central Station to warm another building that is just across the road.

== Traffic ==
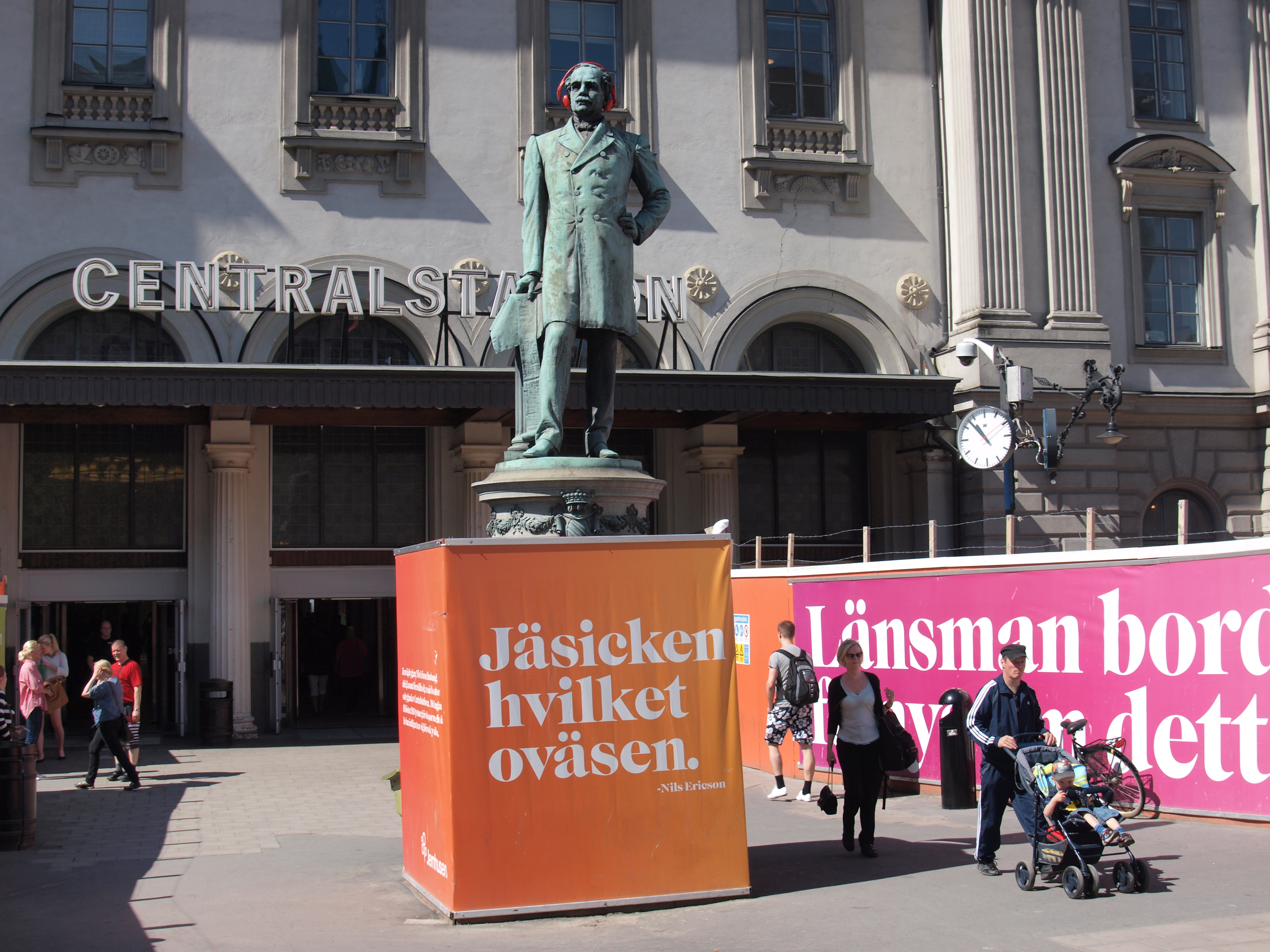
The front of the station being renovated during summer 2012. Reflecting this, the statue of Nils Ericson in front of the main entrance is wearing ear mufflers and accompanied with a text saying Jäsicken hvilket oväsen ("Oh my gosh what a noise").

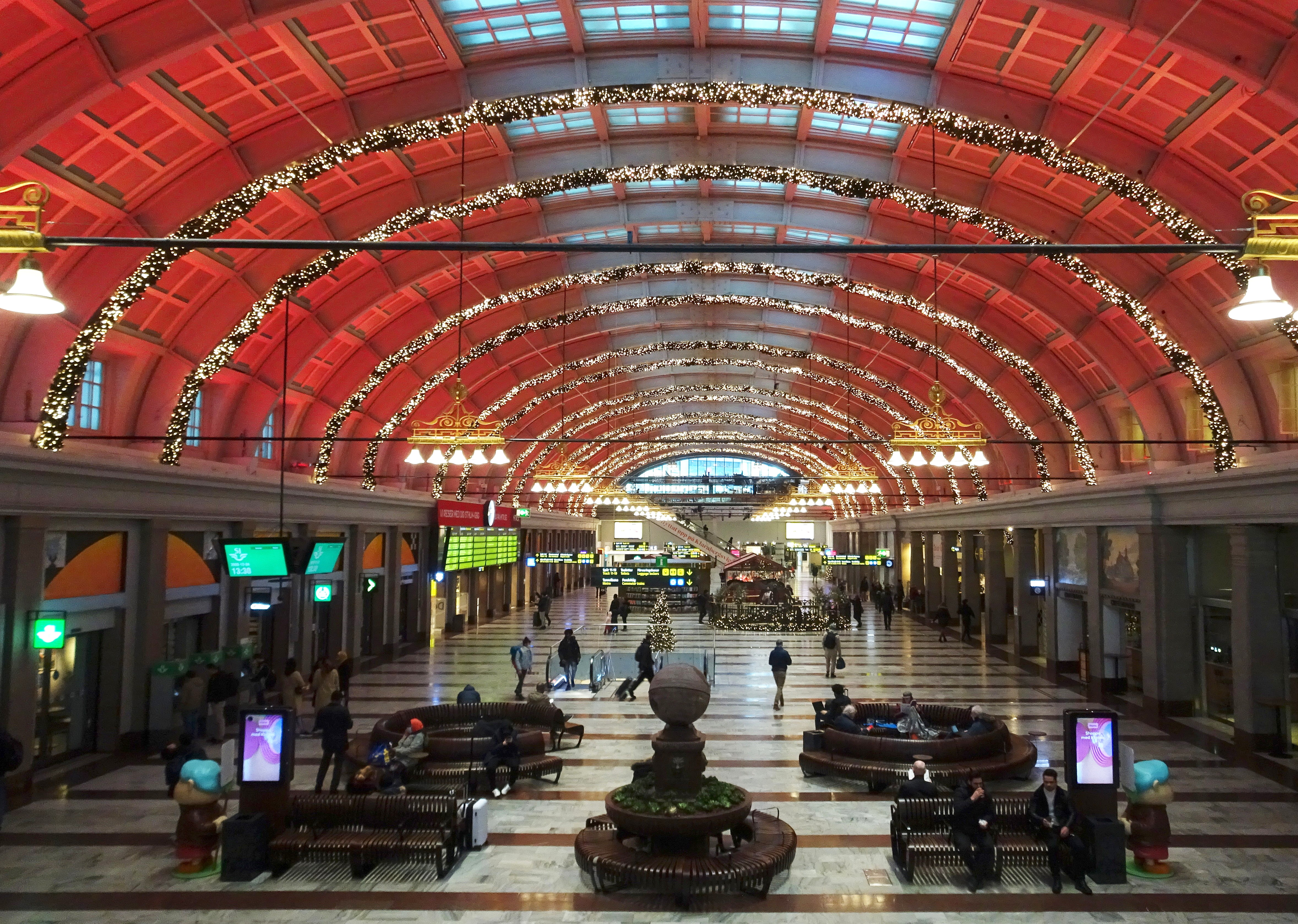
The main station hall decorated for Christmas 2020.

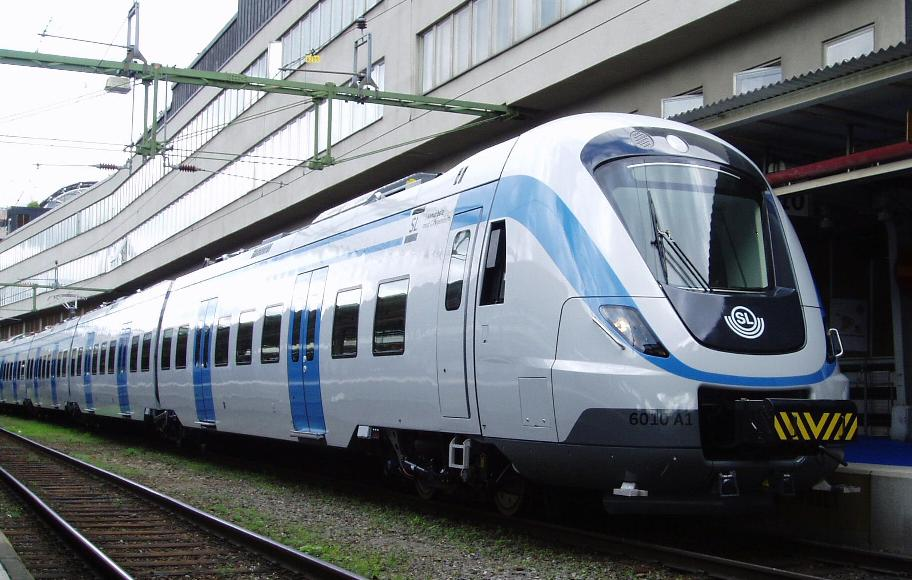
A SL X60 commuter train on platform 10

The station consists of two parts:

- The northern part, with tracks 1 to 7 facing north, forms a terminal station for the Ostkustbanan, Mälarbanan and Arlandabanan railways. Tracks 1 and 2 are reserved for the Arlanda Express, which have platforms level with the train floor allowing step free access. Track 3 is mostly used by Uppsalapendeln and tracks 4 to 7 are used for long-distance and regional traffic and overnight traffic to the north.
- Tracks 10 to 19 in the western part constitute a passing station for Västra stambanan and local commuter trains. Tracks 10 to 12 are mostly used for long-distance and regional trains to the south, but can also be used for traffic to the north, while tracks 17 to 19 are mostly used for long-distance and regional trains to the north, but can also be used for traffic to the south. Most of the trains turn back after the Stockholm Central Station, but some trains continue towards the north. The tracks 13-16 were high-floor tracks used for SL commuter trains until July 2017, now used for regional and long-distance trains.

On level with the Northern Railway Square are service depots for long-distance and regional trains. Terminating trains from the south arrive on tracks 17 to 19 where passengers alight, and then continue to the service depots to the north where they are cleaned and have their supplies refilled. Then they return south via tracks 10 to 12. Long-distance trains from tracks 4 to 8 are services in the same way near the Northern Railway Square.

== Commuter train station ==
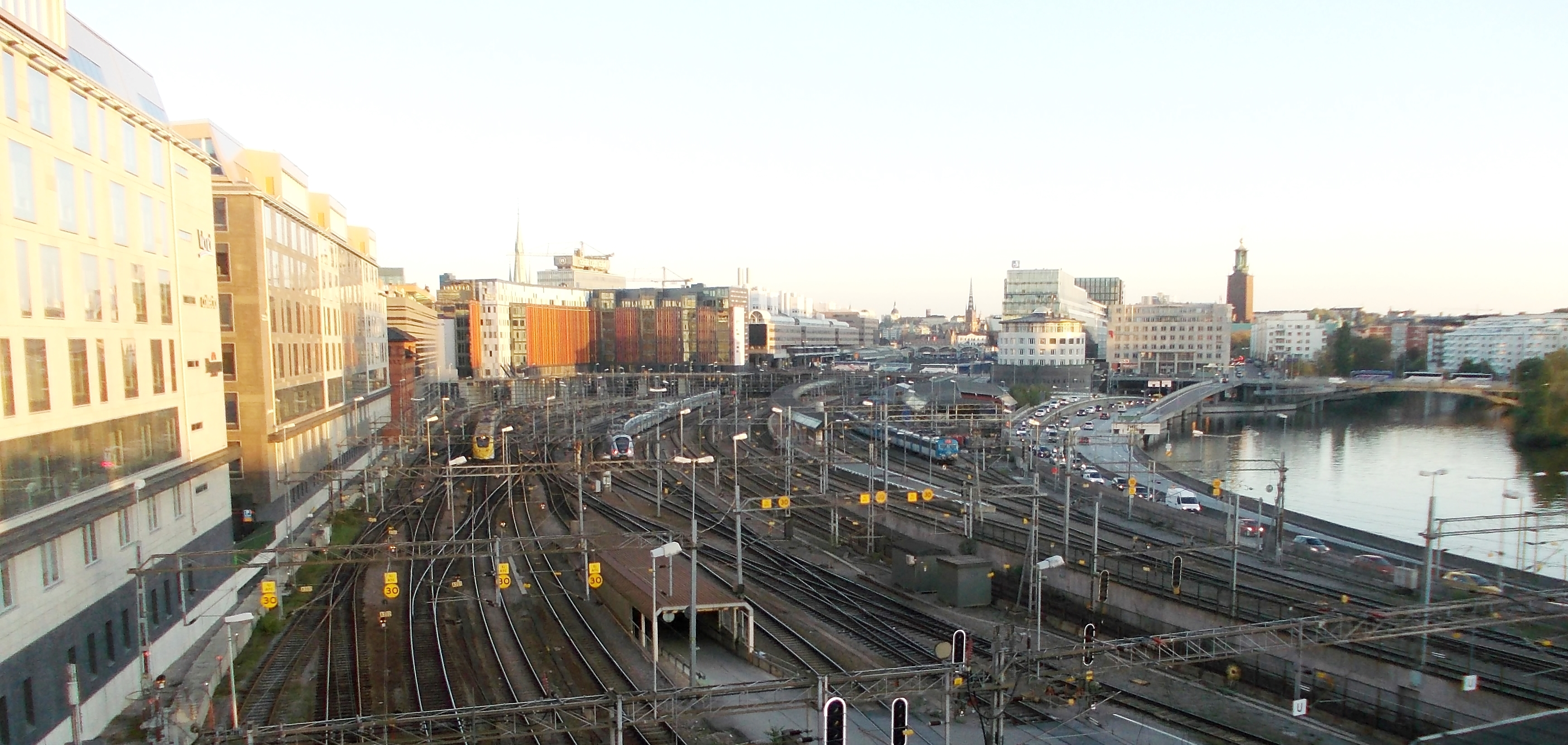
Stockholm Railway Station, view from the bridge

The Stockholm Central station was the busiest station on the Stockholm commuter rail, with about 53,000 boarding the trains and about as many disembarking every weekday (as of 2005). The commuter rail used two island platforms, one for tracks 13 and 14 (southbound trains) and one for tracks 15 and 16 (northbound trains). Each platform has entries with entry gates from the lower level and a ticket sales office on the upper level with an entry from Klarabergsviadukten. From 2017 the commuter trains moved to a separate underground station, known as Stockholm City railway station.

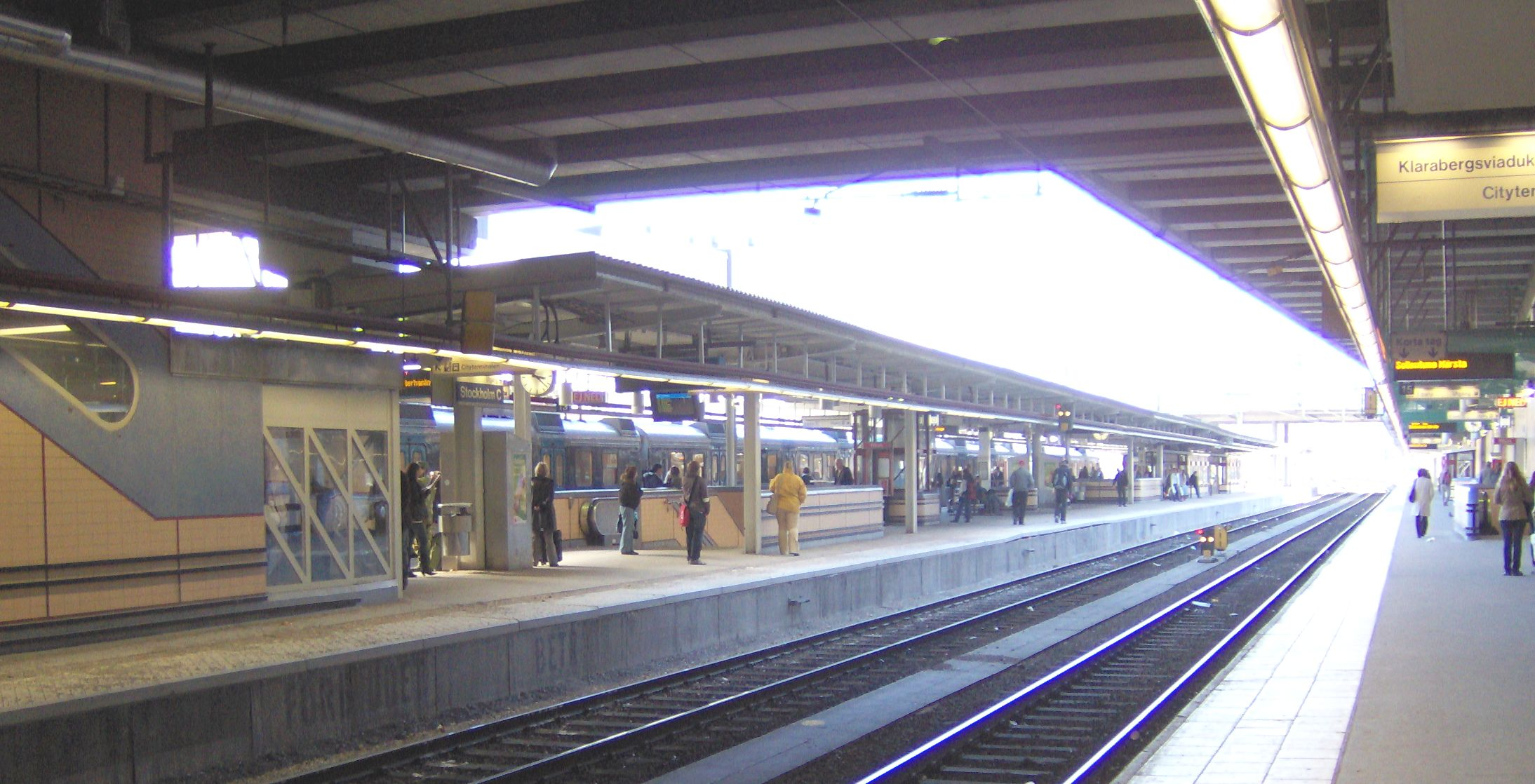
Platforms at the Stockholm Central Station

The commuter trains go on their own tracks along Ostkustbanan via Tomteboda, and after Karlberg railway station they go underneath the other tracks to avoid conflict with long-distance and regional trains. After the centre, they join the Stockholm connection railway to the south, which has had two tracks since 1871. In 2006, a decision was finally made to construct Citybanan, a new track in a tunnel, and Stockholm City railway station, a new station for commuter trains below T-Centralen metro station. The construction was started in January 2009 and was completed in 2017.

== Bus ==
A bus terminal called Cityterminalen is located adjacent to the main station, directly connected by a short pedestrian tunnel.

Local services offered by SL stop at various bus stops close to the main station's exits.

== Metro station ==
Services on all lines of the Stockholm Metro network are provided on a separate station named T-Centralen metro station. An underground pedestrian passage connects it to Stockholm Central Station.

== Services ==
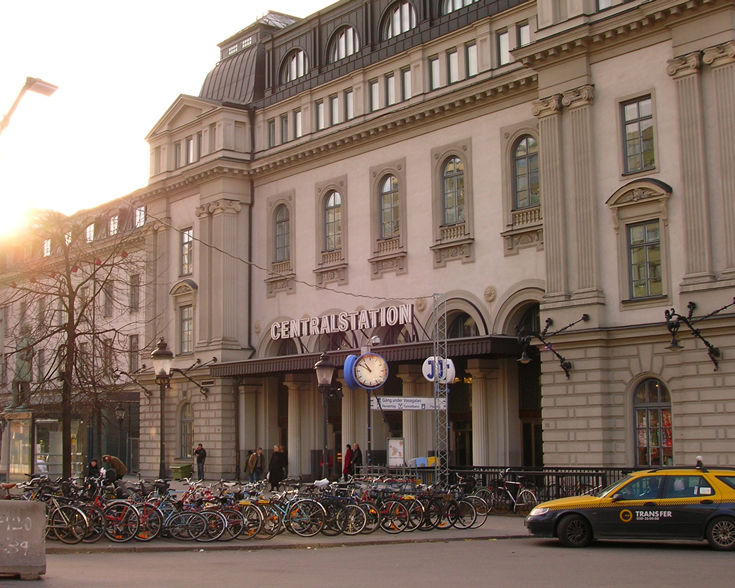
Bicycles outside the station

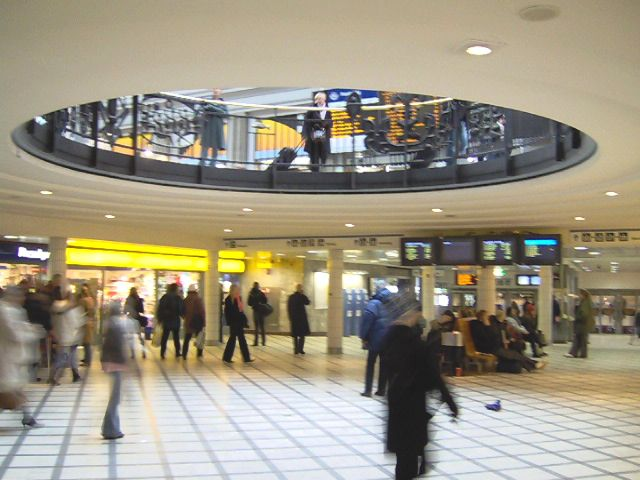
Ringen ("the ring"), in the centre of the ground floor, is one of Stockholm Central station's most distinctive interior features. Citizens of Stockholm like to refer to it as Spottkoppen ("the spittoon").

- Arlanda Express
  - Stockholm-Arlanda Airport
- SJ
  - Intercity services
    - Falun via Uppsala, Avesta Krylbo, Borlänge
    - Karlstad via Katrineholm, Hallsberg
    - Gothenburg via Södertälje syd, Katrineholm, Hallsberg, Skövde, Herrljunga
    - Mora via Uppsala, Avesta Krylbo, Borlänge
    - Östersund via Uppsala, Gävle, Bräcke
    - Sundsvall via Uppsala, Gävle
    - Malmö via Norrköping, Nässjö, Lund
  - Night train
    - Luleå via Uppsala, Gävle, Sundsvall, Umeå
    - Narvik (Norway) via Umeå, Boden, Gällivare, Kiruna
    - Storlien via Uppsala, Gävle, Sundsvall, Östersund, Åre
    - Malmö via Norrköping, Nässjö, Alvesta
    - Berlin (Germany) via Norrköping, Linköping, Nässjö, Alvesta, Lund, Malmö
  - SJ regional rail services
    - Gävle via Uppsala, some service continues to Ljusdal
    - Gothenburg via Västerås, Örebro, Hallsberg, Skövde, Herrljunga, Alingsås
    - Uppsala
    - Västerås via Enköping,
    - Hallsberg via Enköping, Västerås, Arboga, Örebro
  - X 2000, also called "SJ Snabbtåg" since 11 December 2011, Express Intercity services
    - Åre via Uppsala, Sundsvall, Östersund (seasonal during ski season in Åre)
    - Arvika via Hallsberg, Karlstad
    - Borås via Skövde, Herrljunga
    - Malmö via Norrköping, Nässjö, Lund
    - Copenhagen (Denmark) via Norrköping, Nässjö, Lund, Malmö
    - Gothenburg via Katrineholm, Skövde
    - Oslo (Norway) via Karlstad, Arvika
    - Nässjö via Norrköping
    - Sundsvall via Uppsala, Gävle
    - Uddevalla via Skövde, Herrljunga
    - Strömstad via Skövde, Herrljunga, Uddevalla (during summer holidays)
- Mälartåg
  - Regional rail
    - Örebro via Södertälje syd, Strängnäs, Eskilstuna, Arboga
    - Hallsberg via Södertälje, Katrineholm
    - Norrköping via Södertälje, Nyköping, Kolmården
- Snälltåget
  - Intercity
    - Malmö via Norrköping, Linköping, Nässjö, Lund
  - Night train
    - Åre (Seasonal)
    - Berlin (Germany) via Copenhagen (Denmark), Hamburg (Germany) (Seasonal)
- VR Snabbtåg Sverige
  - Intercity
    - Gothenburg via Katrineholm, Skövde, Alingsås
- Tågab
  - Intercity
    - Karlstad
- Flygbussarna (bus departing from Cityterminalen)
    - Arlanda Airport (ARN)
    - Bromma Airport (BMA)
    - Skavsta Airport (NYO)
    - Västerås Airport (VST)

== Mural art ==
The landscape paintings in the central hall were painted by two Swedish artists.

Natan Johansson was born on 31 august in Kalmar 1893, and died November 1951. He was a Swedish painter who studied at the Art Academy in Stockholm from 1916 to 1920. For a long time he was responsible for the decoration art at the royal dramatic theater. He also painted a series of religious posters for school use.

John Ericsson was born on 12 June 1877 in Norrsunda, and died 12 november 1951. He was a Swedish scenographer and a decoration painter, who worked at the royal dramatic theater at the same time as Natan Johansson. They are nowadays mostly known for their landscape motifs on the east side of the central departures hall in the main train station in Stockholm; their paintings were completed in 1927 while the station was being built.

The paintings

Saltoloukta. In this painting we see a lake in the color blue mixed with light green, sunlight cutting through the clouds over the mountains surrounded by bushes and trees. The emotion is harmonic and calm.

Vedasjön, Nordingrå. In this painting we see trees in autumn surrounding a river, the colors are drab. the emotion that occur are sadness and yearning

Åreskutan. A winter land painting, there are multiple pine trees with heavy snow weighing down on the branches. Snow covers the mountains we can see in the background. the colors are dark and showing that is night.

Leksands kyrka. In this painting we can see the church in the middle surrounded by multiple trees with heavy snow on them, in the center in front of the church there are a few people forming a line away from the church. is light and frosty

Uddeholms Herrgård. In the center is a large white building framed by two large oak trees, in front of the white building there is a roundabout, to the left of the roundabout we get a glimpse of water. The colors are real and natural

Vadstena slott. Is a painting of a castle surrounded by water, the painting is painted in ¾ angle, on the far left there is a sailboat. The colors are natural and real

Varbergs fästning. This is a painting of the ocean hitting the shore and in the background there is a level and a house on top of it, the colors of the rocks are earth colors, the water is aquaphor.

Dybäcks herrgård. In this painting we can see the entree of a chateau framed by a lot of green nature, The path to the entre is a bridge over water, in the background we can see a yard.
