= Charlottenberg Station =

Railway station in Eda, Sweden

Charlottenberg
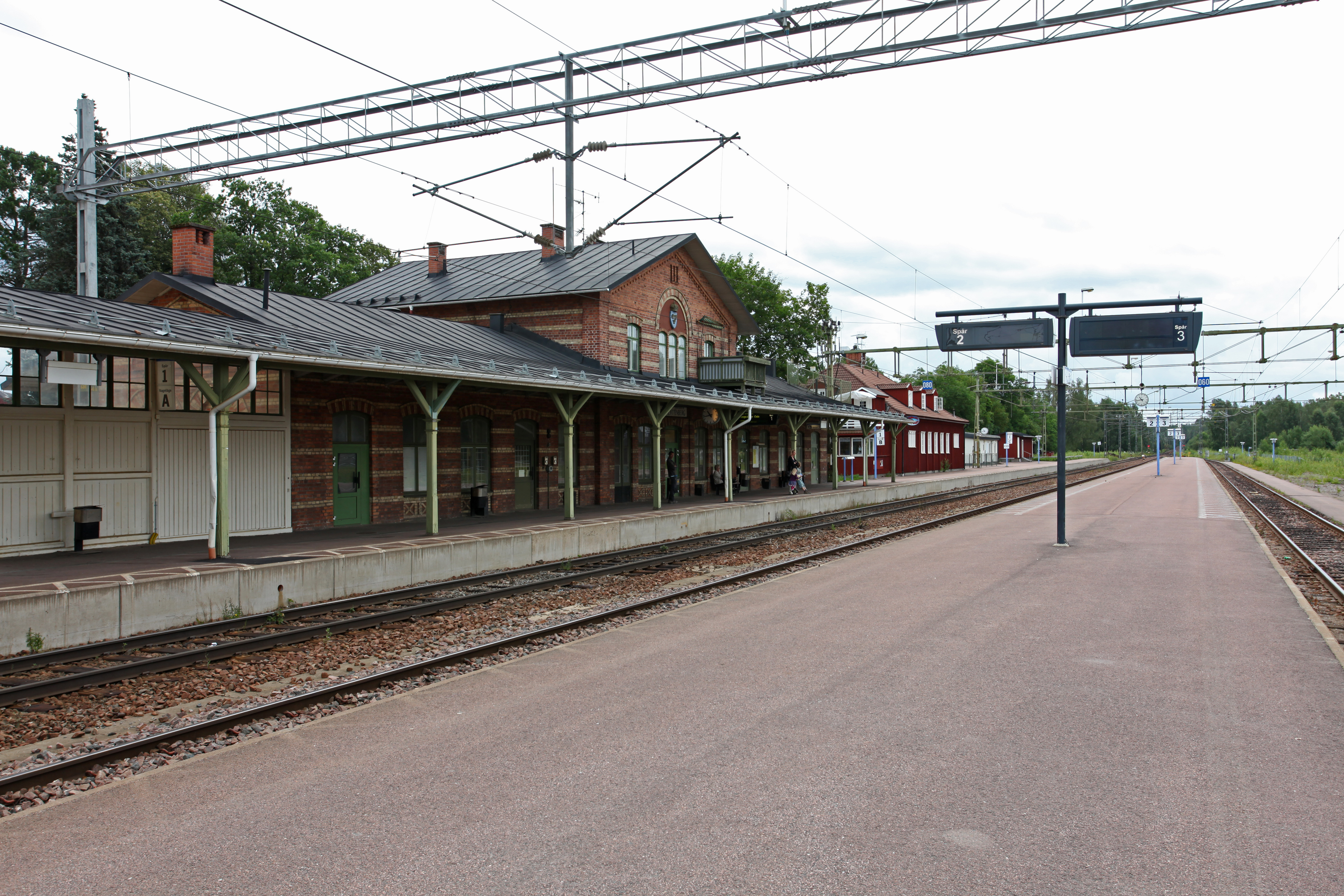

General information
- Location: Charlottenberg, Eda; Sweden
- Coordinates: 59°53′03″N 12°17′51″E
- Elevation: 125.5 metres (412 ft)
- Owner: Jernhusen
- Operator: Trafikverket
- Line: Värmland Line
- Distance: 432.2 km (268.6 mi) (Stockholm C); 142.86 km (88.77 mi) (Oslo S)
- Tracks: 2

Construction
- Structure type: At-grade

History
- Opened: 11 November 1865; 160 years ago
Location

Charlottenberg Station (Swedish: Charlottenberg station) is a railway station located on the Kongsvinger Line and the Värmland Line at Charlottenberg in Eda, Sweden. The station is located 5 kilometers (3.1 mi) from the Norway–Sweden border and was opened in 1865 for changing crew on international trains between Sweden and Norway.

Preceding station	Regional trains	Following station
Terminus	Värmlandstrafik	Åmotfors towards Kristinehamn
Preceding station	Vy Tåg	Following station
Kongsvinger Terminus	Vy regional	Terminus
Kongsvinger towards Oslo	Vy regional	Terminus
