= Värmlandstrafik =

Swedish public transport authority

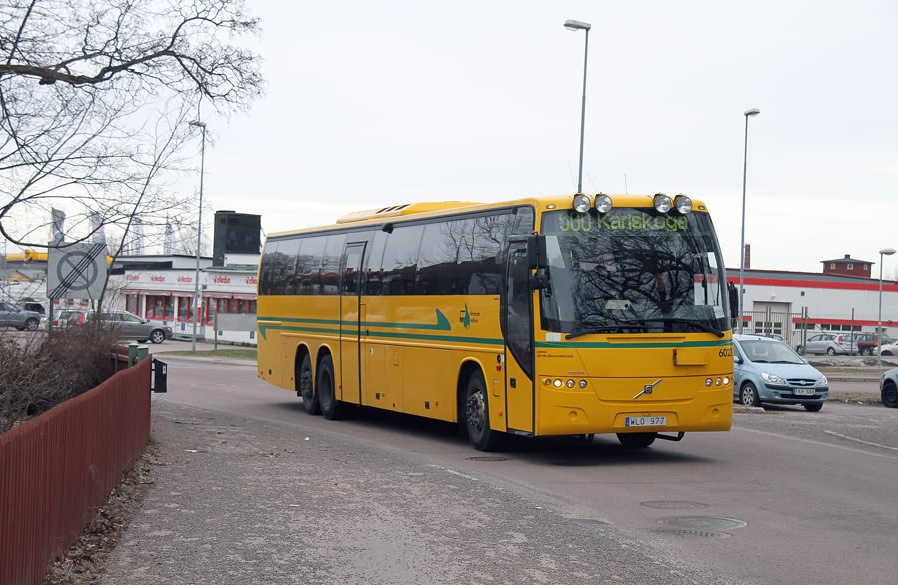
Värmlandstrafik bus

Värmlandstrafik is the public transport authority for Värmland, Sweden.

Värmlandstrafik has two train lines: Charlottenberg – Karlstad – Degerfors and Karlstad – Torsby, and also validity for its ticket on the SJ line between Karlstad – Åmål. There are city bus lines in Arvika, Hammarö, Karlstad, Kristinehamn and Torsby. Värmlandstrafik has also many regional bus lines.
