= Värmland Line =

Railway line in Sweden

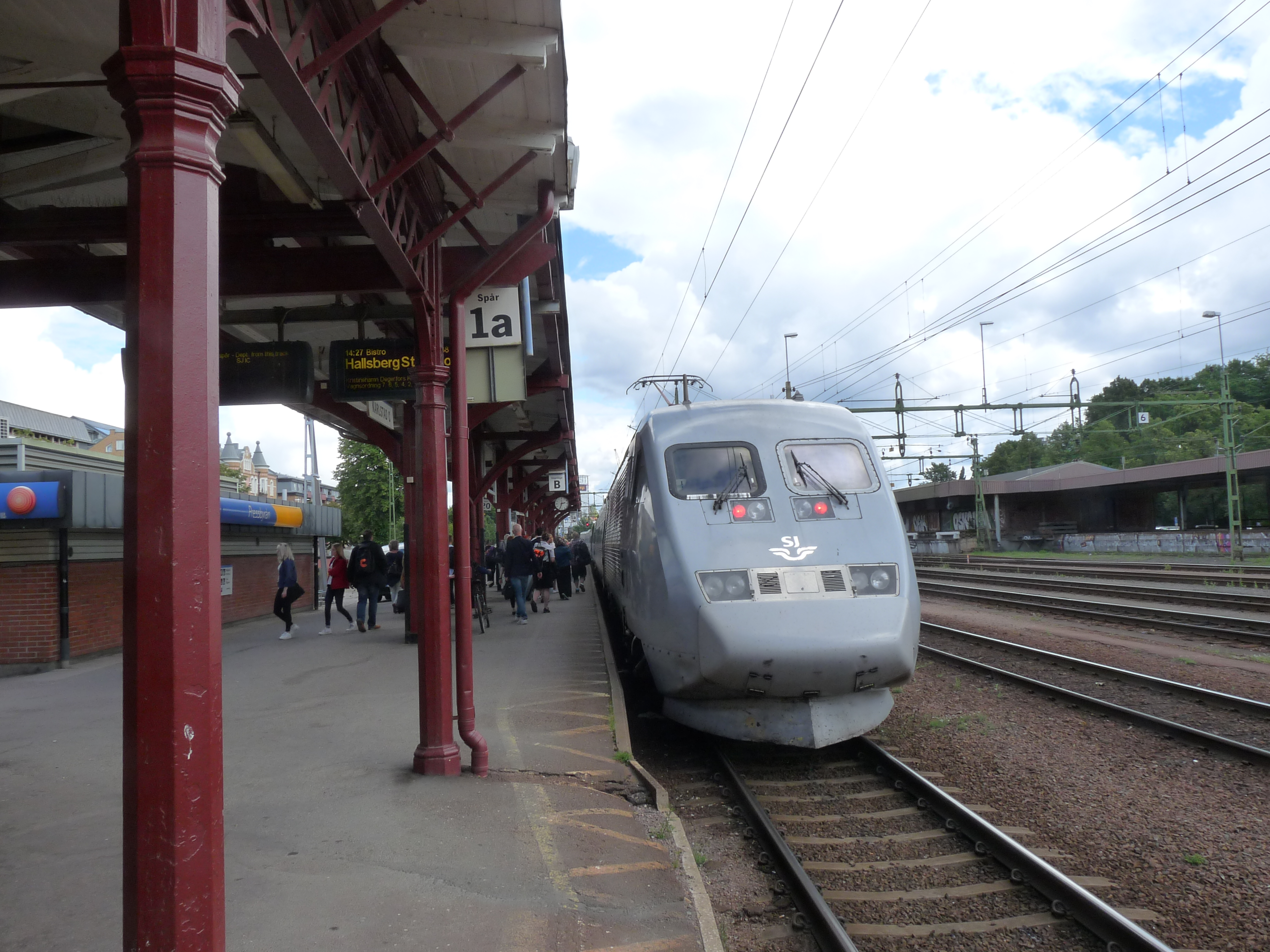
- X2000 at Karlstad C

Overview
- Native name: Värmlandsbanan
- Status: Open
- Locale: Sweden
- Termini: Laxå (connects Västra Stambanan); Norwegian border

Service
- System: Swedish railway
- Operator(s): Swedish Transport Administration

Technical
- Line length: 208 km
- Number of tracks: 1
- Character: Passenger and freight
- Track gauge: 1,435 mm (4 ft 8 1/2 in)
- Electrification: 15 kV 16.7 Hz AC

The Värmland Line (Swedish: Värmlandsbanan), previously known as the Northwestern Main Line (Swedish: Nordvästra stambanan) is a 208-kilometer (129 mi) long railway line between Laxå and the Norway–Sweden border at Charlottenberg Station. In Norway, the line continues as the Kongsvinger Line.

Passenger train stops are:

- Charlottenberg
- Åmotfors
- Arvika
- Edane
- Högboda
- Lene
- Fagerås
- Kil
- Karlstad C
- Välsviken
- Kristinehamn
- Degerfors
- Laxå
