= Hallsberg =

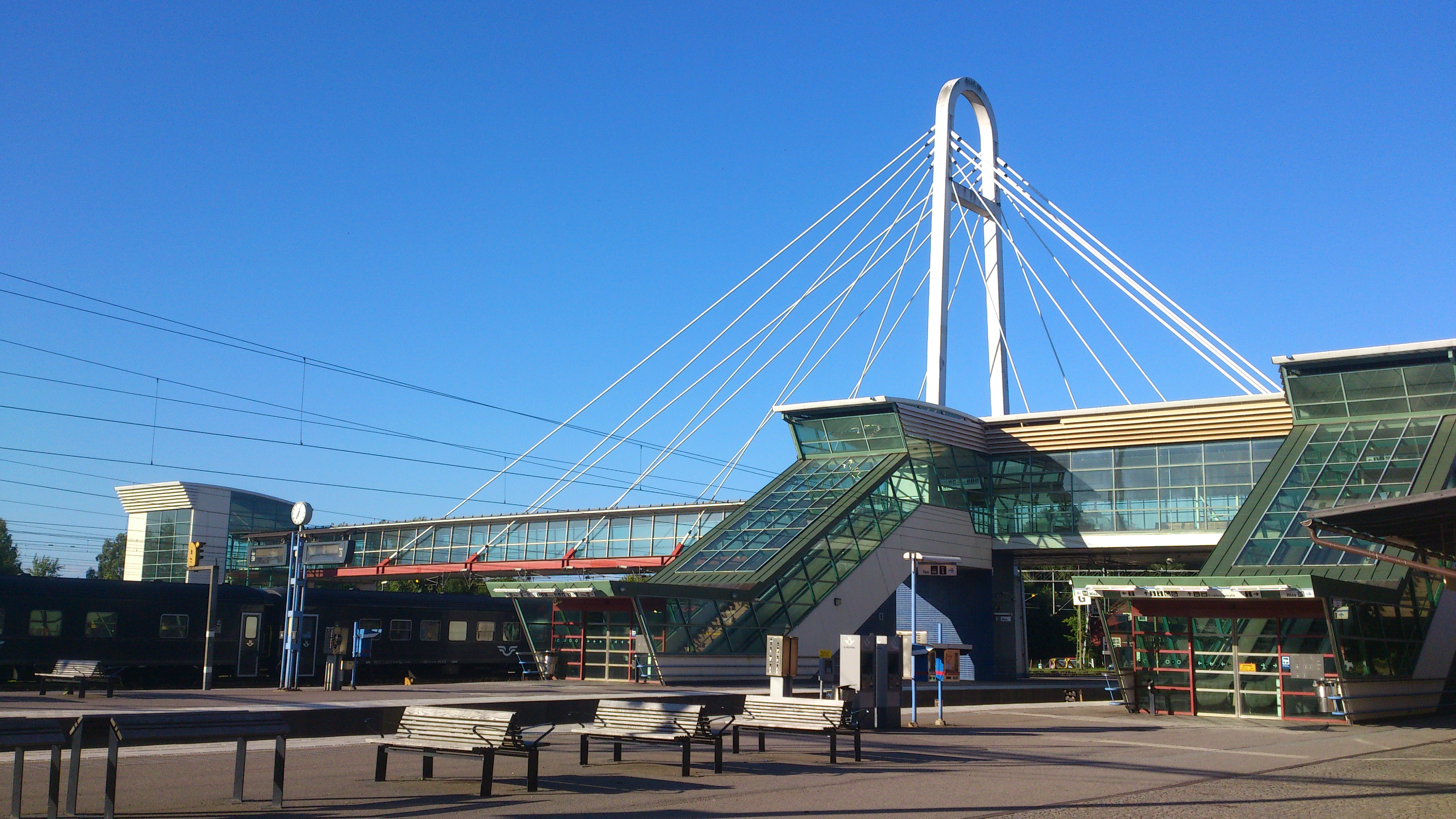
- Hallsberg railway station

- Location within Örebro Location within Sweden
- Coordinates: 59°04′N 15°07′E
- Country: Sweden
- Province: Närke
- County: Örebro County
- Municipality: Hallsberg Municipality and Kumla Municipality

Area
  - Total: 8.19 km^{2} (3.16 sq mi)

Population (31 December 2010)
  - Total: 7,122
  - Density: 870/km^{2} (2,300/sq mi)
- Time zone: UTC+1 (CET)
  - Summer (DST): UTC+2 (CEST)

Hallsberg is a bimunicipal locality and the seat of Hallsberg Municipality, Örebro County, Sweden with 7,122 inhabitants in 2010. It is also partly located in Kumla Municipality.

== Overview ==
This settlement grew up around a railway junction, and is these days primarily known as a place where you have to change trains. The railway station is oversized for the town's own needs. Hallsberg was declared a municipalsamhälle (a type of borough within its municipality) in 1883 and got the title of a market town (köping) in 1908. Since 1971 it is instead the seat of the enlarged Hallsberg Municipality.

Hallsberg is famous for its huge classification yard and for the large Hallsberg railway station. The reason for this is that railways (from practically all cardinal directions) to and from Stockholm, Gothenburg, Mjölby, Örebro and Karlstad join here. Among the more important is the Västra stambanan ("western main line"). As the railways were built, Hallsberg grew up around it.

A sight in the Hallsberg is the Bergööska House, built in the 1880s. It was designed by the architect Ferdinand Boberg, and contains wall-paintings by Carl Larsson, depicting the Bergöö family and other well-known people of Hallsberg.

The main industries are Volvo, Ahlsell, and enterprises related to the railway industry, like the freight operator Hector Rail. Sports equipment manufacturer Kosa is also situated here.

Hallsberg has three twin towns.

Sven Wingquist, co-founder of SKF in 1907, was born in Hallsberg on December 10, 1876.
