= Rail transport in Sweden =

Sweden
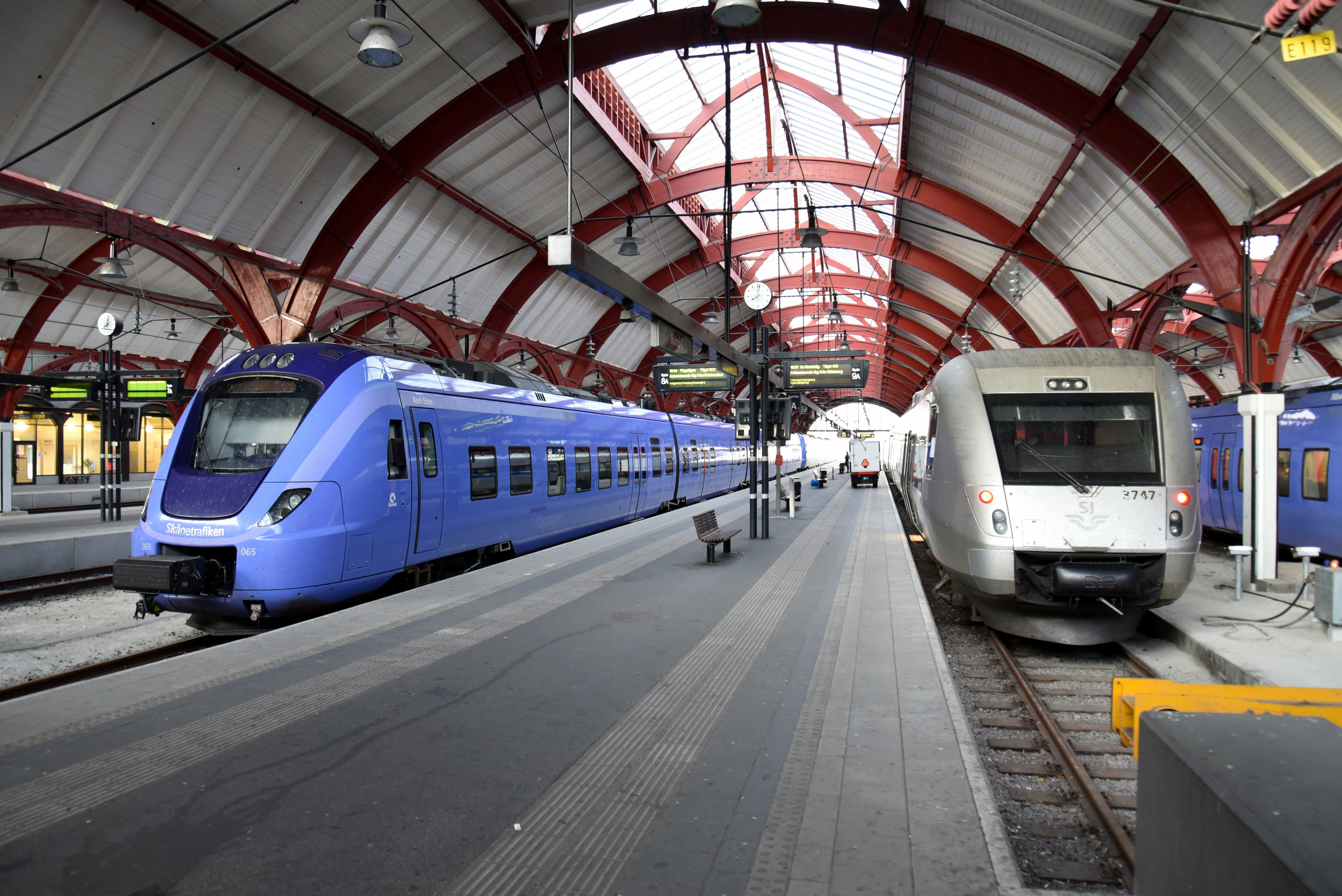
- Malmö Central Station

Operation
- National railway: SJ
- Infrastructure company: Swedish Transport Administration
- Major operators: Arlanda Express, Inlandsbanan, Krösatågen, VR Snabbtåg Sverige, Mälartåg, Norrtåg, Storstockholms lokaltrafik (SL), SJ, Snälltåget, Tågab, Vy Tåg, Pågatågen, Värmlandstrafik, Vy, Västtrafik, X-trafik, Øresundståg, Östgötapendeln

Statistics
- Ridership: 264.6 million

System length
- Total: 10,912 kilometres (6,780 mi)
- Double track: 2,058 kilometres (1,279 mi)
- Electrified: 8,186 kilometres (5,087 mi)

Track gauge
- Main: 1,435 mm (4 ft 8 1/2 in) standard gauge
- 1,435 mm (4 ft 8 1/2 in): 10,846 kilometres (6,739 mi)
- 891 mm (2 ft 11 3/32 in): 66 kilometres (41 mi)

Electrification
- Main: 15 kV 16.7 Hz AC

Features
- Longest tunnel: Hallandsås Tunnel (8.7 km)
- Longest bridge: Öresundsbron (7.8 km)
- Max elevation: 601 m a.s.l. at Storlien
- Min elevation: 30 m b.s.l. at Stockholm City railway station
Map
- System map

Rail transport in Sweden uses a network of 10,912 kilometres (6,780 miles), the 23rd-largest in the world. Construction of the first railway line in Sweden began in 1855. The major operator of passenger trains has traditionally been the state-owned SJ, though today around 70% of all rail traffic consists of subsidised local and regional trains for which the regional public transport authorities bear responsibility. Passenger traffic has increased significantly since the turn of the millennium, and in 2019 Sweden ranked eleventh in the world (as measured in passenger kilometres per capita) and third in the European Union, as well as sixth in the world when measured by passenger share.

In 1988, driven by significant deficits at Swedish State Railways, the Swedish parliament pursued a separation strategy that involved partitioning the ownership of rail infrastructure from train operations. This move, which made Sweden the first European country to undertake such a separation, also involved opening the railway system to private train operators, including open-access operators, and introducing competitive bidding for regional service contracts.

Sweden is a member of the International Union of Railways (UIC). The UIC Country Code for Sweden is 74.

== Operators ==
Passenger traffic on Swedish railways consists of commercial long-distance lines as well as regional and local trains, which are always subsidised by the regional public transport authorities. As measured by train kilometres, the commercial lines correspond to 28% of the traffic (in 2016), the rest being subsidised local and regional rail traffic.

The major national commercial passenger train operator is state-owned SJ, which has a comprehensive network of commercially operated routes. High speed routes are operated between the major cities with few stops in smaller towns, and InterCity and Regional routes are available throughout the country, serving smaller towns and stations. Between the major cities in southern Sweden, SJ operates the high-speed train X 2000 (200 km/h) on an hourly basis. VR Snabbtåg Sverige operates high-speed trains (200 km/h) between Stockholm and Gothenburg. Snälltåget operates the route Stockholm-Malmö-Copenhagen-Hamburg-Berlin. Tågab operates services Gothenburg-Skövde-Karlstad, Gothenburg-Trollhättan-Karlstad-Stockholm, Gothenburg-Falun and Karlstad-Alvesta. Fares in the commercial traffic can be complex and usually vary depending on demand.

The subsidised traffic covering most Swedish railway routes are handled and marketed by the different regional transport authorities, such as Skånetrafiken, Västtrafik and Storstockholms lokaltrafik. Usually, tickets to these trains are sold by the regional public transport authority also holding full responsibility for the trains despite contracting SJ or a private operator, sometimes from another country, to actually run the trains. Many regional train systems, such as Øresundståg, Krösatågen, Västtågen, Norrtåg and Mälartåg are joint ventures where different regional public authorities are involved. Tram systems are used in Gothenburg, Norrköping, Stockholm and, since 2020, Lund. There is a metro system in Stockholm, the Stockholm Metro.

While most current railway lines of Sweden were determined and built by the state, and receive their technical upkeep from the public as well, SJ no longer holds a monopoly on operating and owning passenger trains where such can be run profitably on a commercial basis. Large parts of the rail network serve parts of the country which do not generate enough passenger or cargo traffic to make a profit, and on some of these stretches SJ has held a de facto monopoly until recently (2010, see below in this section). Average speed is an important factor regarding profitability (more distance per hour means more income per hour). All subsidised and commercial traffic is operated on state-owned tracks, except Inlandsbanan, Roslagsbanan and Saltsjöbanan which are locally or regionally owned and Arlandabanan which is owned by private interests.

A decision was made in March 2009 to cancel the monopoly for SJ. By autumn 2009, free competition was allowed on Saturdays and Sundays when there is more room on the tracks, and competition was allowed to a full extent by autumn of 2010. In 2019, the Swedish railways were called 'the most deregulated railways in the world'.

Rail traffic is supervised by the Swedish Transport Administration (Trafikverket), a government agency.

== History ==
The first Swedish railroad for public transport using horse-drawn carriages, the Frykstads railroad in Värmland opened in 1849.

In 1853 the Riksdag of the Estates (a parliament chamber) decided that the State would build main line railways, but that other lines would be built by private enterprises (often with cities as main owners), and in 1856 the first stretch, between Örebro and Nora (a private railroad), was opened for traffic.

The main line railways were of major importance for the development of the Swedish industry. The first two main line railways were the Southern, stretching from Stockholm to Malmö in the south, and the Western, to Gothenburg in the west. These line railways were finished between 1860 and 1864. The Northern railway runs parallel to the Baltic coast (but not along it) up to Boden in northern Sweden, and was finished in 1894. The Inland Railway runs from Gällivare in the north to Kristinehamn in the center of the country, through the central parts of northern Sweden, and was built between 1908 and 1937. It was a part of the 1853 decision that the railways should avoid coasts, and not make detours to pass medium-size cities along the route. The reason for avoiding coasts (most evident for the railway to northern Sweden) was to protect it from military attacks, and because steam boats were already established along the coasts as a much faster transport method than before. Railways built by private companies, e.g. Västkustbanan (1888), were however sometimes built very close to the coast.

The construction of the early main lines provided a fast and safe connection from the mines in the north to the rest of Sweden. It also facilitated business (and private) travel, which had earlier required horse-drawn carriages. Roslagsbanan is the oldest electrified railway line for personnel transportation in northern Europe. Malmbanan, the railway line between Luleå, Sweden and Narvik, Norway was inaugurated on 14 July 1903. The stretch between Kiruna and Riksgränsen was the first major railway line in Sweden to be electrified in 1915.

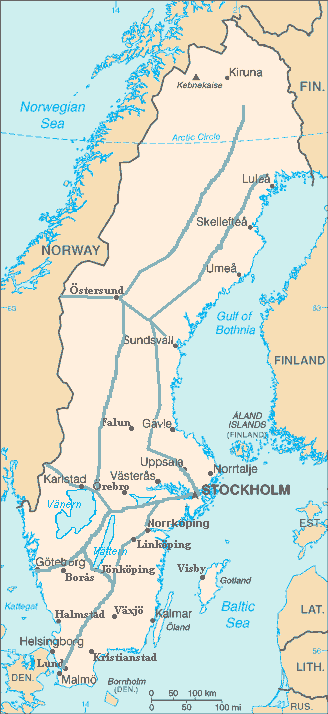
Main Line railways built in Sweden between 1860 and 1930.

== Network ==
- Total: 15,006.25 km (includes 3,600 km of privately owned railways)
- Standard gauge: 15,006.25 km of 1,435 mm (4 ft 8 1/2 in) gauge (8,100 km electrified and 4,925.75 km double track (2008)
- Narrow gauge: 221 km of 891 mm (2 ft 11 3/32 in) (Swedish three foot) gauge (2001), but narrow-gauge is now dismantled and converted to standard-gauge, except for Roslagsbanan and a few heritage railways. (2019).

Unlike the roads, railways in Sweden use left-handed traffic for trains (the same as the metro) because Sweden drove on the left until 1967. Railways did not switch because of its extreme cost as well as the engines of the time had the driver's seat on the left side and the signals are normally located to the left and hence are easier to see. Only railways in Malmö and further south have planned right-hand traffic due to their connection with Denmark. However, as signals are placed in both directions on all tracks, it is possible to drive both left- and right-sided at the traffic controller's discretion.

== Lines ==
=== Main lines ===
There used to be six main lines (stambanor), all nationally owned:

- Västra stambanan (Western main line), 453 km, Stockholm–Gothenburg through Katrineholm–Hallsberg–Laxå–Falköping
- Södra stambanan (Southern main line), 381 km, Malmö–Falköping through Nässjö–Jönköping
- Östra stambanan (Eastern main line), 216 km, Nässjö–Katrineholm through Mjölby–Linköping–Norrköping)
- Norra stambanan (Northern main line), 484 km, Stockholm-Ånge through Uppsala-Avesta Krylbo
- Stambanan genom övre Norrland (Main line through upper Norrland), 629 km, Bräcke–Boden through Långsele–Vännäs
- Nordvästra stambanan (Northwestern main line), 209 km, Laxå – Norwegian border through Karlstad–Kil–Charlottenberg

Some lines were upgraded to main lines but have since been downgraded:

- Mittbanan (Norrland cross line), about 500 km, Sundsvall – Norwegian border through Ånge–Östersund
- Inlandsbanan, about 1300 km, Kristinehamn–Gällivare through Mora–Östersund

The naming rationale was that lines built by the state were main lines, but others, such as by private companies, were not. Mainly 1940–1952, most lines were purchased by the state, making the term main line less well-defined.

Today, changes have been made in the terminology reducing the number of main lines to four. The northwestern main line is not considered a main line anymore and has been renamed Värmlandsbanan. The southern main line between Nässjö and Falköping has also been downgraded since what was once part of the Eastern main line (Nässjö–Katrineholm) is now considered a part of the southern one. The Norrland cross line is not a main line anymore, but a regional railway. The northern main line south of Ockelbo refers to a shorter way than the line through Avesta. The East Coast Line (Ostkustbanan) Stockholm-Sundsvall is now considered a main line, since it has the majority of the passenger traffic into Norrland. The Inlandsbanan was considered a main line for a few decades, but is now a tourist railway only. The main lines are still owned by the state, except Inlandsbanan, which is owned by the counties it runs through.

=== Other lines ===
- Ådalsbanan
- Älmhult–Olofström railway
- Älvsborgsbanan
- Bastuträsk–Skelleftehamn railway
- Bergslagsbanan
- Bergslagspendeln
- Blekinge kustbana
- Bofors–Strömtorp railway
- Bohusbanan
- Bollnäs–Furudal
- Botniabanan
- Dalabanan
- Forsmo–Hoting railway
- Fryksdalsbanan
- Godsstråket genom Bergslagen
- Godsstråket genom Skåne
- Göteborgs hamnbana
- Halmstad–Nässjö railway
- Haparandabanan
- Jönköpingsbanan
- Kinnekullebanan
- Kontinentalbanan
- Kristinehamn–Persberg railway
- Kust till kust-banan
- Lilla Edet – Alvhem railway
- Lysekilsbanan
- Malmbanan
- Markarydsbanan
- Mellansel–Örnsköldsvik railway
- Mora–Märbäck railway
- Morjärv–Karlborgsbruk railway
- Mälarbanan
- Nässjö–Åseda railway
- Nässjö–Oskarshamn railway
- Norbergsbanan
- Norge/Vänerbanan
- Nynäsbanan
- Örbyhus–Hallstavik railway
- Öresundsbanan
- Österlenbanan
- Ostkustbanan
- Piteåbanan
- Roslagsbanan
- Rååbanan
- Sala–Oxelösund railway
- Skånebanan
- Storuman–Hällnäs railway
- Stångådalsbanan
- Svealandsbanan
- Söderhamn–Kilafors railway
- Södra stambanan
- Tjustbanan
- Viskadalsbanan
- Vännäs–Holmsund railway
- Västerdalsbanan
- Västkustbanan
- Ystadbanan

== Railway links with adjacent countries ==
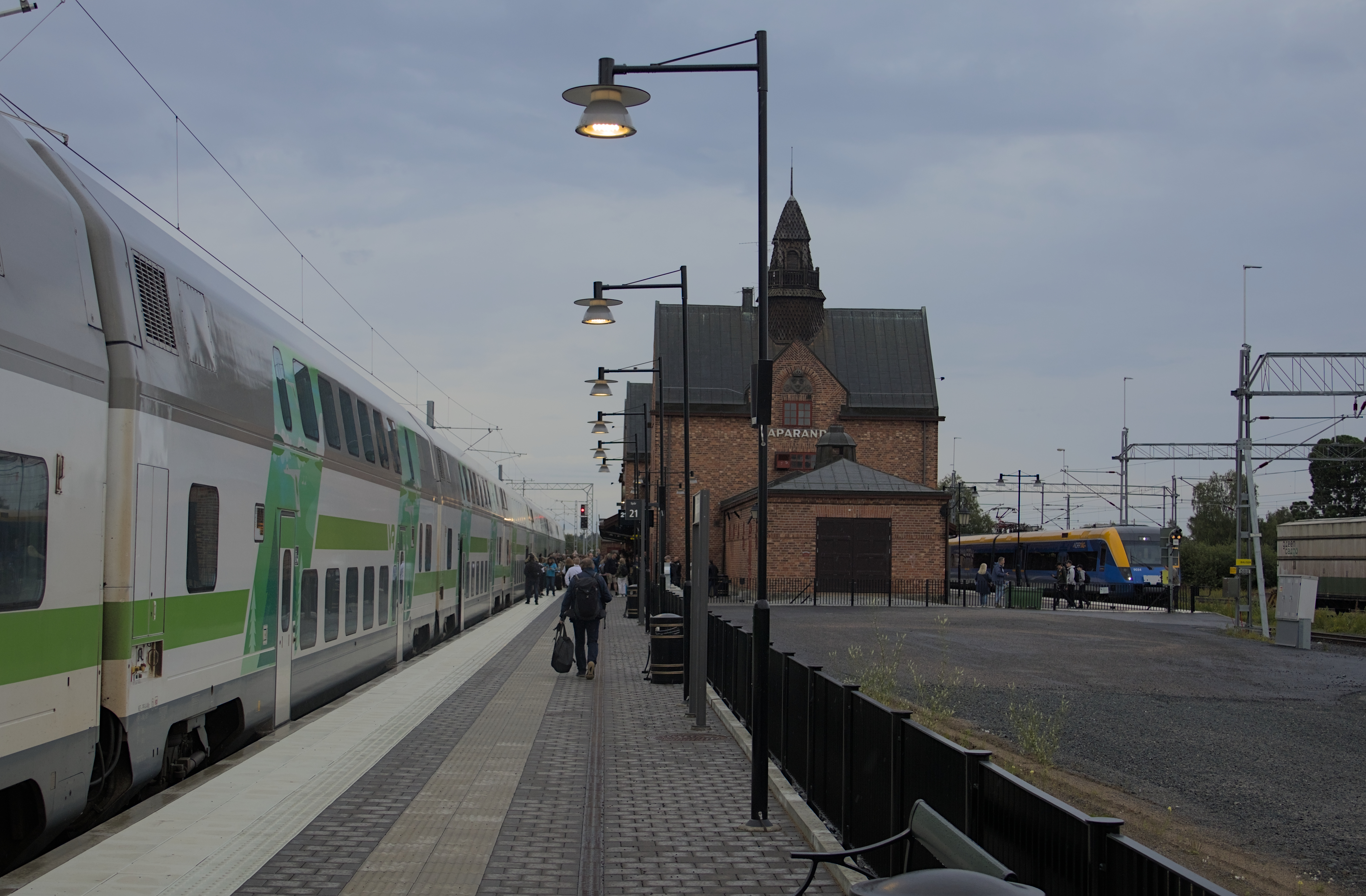
Finnish and Swedish trains at the Haparanda border station

=== Bordering countries ===
- Denmark: same gauge, voltage change 15 kV AC / 25 kV AC – Øresund Bridge
- Finland: break-of-gauge 1,435 mm (4 ft 8 1/2 in)/1,524 mm (5 ft), voltage change 15 kV AC / 25 kV AC – Tornio–Haparanda railway
- Norway: same gauge, same voltage

Sweden and Norway have the same Automatic Train Control (ATC) system and the same voltage, meaning that trains can generally cross the border without being specially modified. Sweden and Denmark have different ATC systems and different voltage, so only specially modified trains can cross the border. The X31K Öresund trains and some of the SJ X2 (branded X2000) trains and some freight and night train locomotives can do so. Such vehicles are needed for border crossing traffic because the Øresund Bridge is not adopted for change between purely Swedish and purely Danish locomotive, or passengers changing between two such trains.

=== Ferry links ===
- Germany: train ferry, same gauge, no electric propulsion on board. Train ferry Malmö–Travemünde, Trelleborg–Sassnitz (Mukran) and Trelleborg–Rostock.
- Poland: same gauge, train ferry Ystad–Świnoujście, no electric propulsion on board.

These train ferries never have electric overhead lines on board, so diesel must be used to get trains onboard/offboard. Generally locomotives are not transported on these ferries, only train cars. Passenger trains are not allowed on the train ferries.

As of August 2026, international passenger trains operate on these lines:

- Norway
  - From Oslo to Gothenburg and to Stockholm
  - From Narvik to Stockholm via Kiruna
  - From Trondheim to Storlien
- Finland
  - From Haparanda to Oulu
- Denmark
  - From Copenhagen via Øresund bridge to Malmö, Stockholm, Gothenburg, Kalmar, and Karlskrona
- Germany
  - From Berlin and Hamburg via Denmark to Malmö and Stockholm

== Major expansion projects ==
Line	Speed	Length	Construction began	Expected start of revenue services
The North Bothnia Line; Norrbotniabanan	250 km/h (155 mph)	270 km	2018 (Umeå–Dåva); 2026 (Dåva–Skellefteå); 2032–2033 Planned (Skellefteå–Luleå)	2026; 2032 or 2036–2038 (Dåva–Skellefteå); TBD (Skellefteå–Luleå)
The West Link; Västlänken	100 km/h (62 mph)	6 km	May 2018	Late 2026 (Central station); 2030 (Full)
The East Link; Ostlänken	250 km/h (155 mph)	160 km	November 2024	2035
Stockholm–Uppsala Quad Tracks	250 km/h (155 mph)?	23 km	2026 (Phase 1); 2028 (Phase 2)	2034
The Southeast Link; Sydostlänken	160 km/h (100 mph)	58 km	2027–2029	?
Gothenburg–Borås Double Tracks	250 km/h (155 mph)?	60 km	2029–2031	2039–2041
Hässleholm–Lund Quad Tracks	250 km/h (155 mph)	60 km	No earlier than 2034; (Klostergården–Stångby)	≈2040

Platform heights

- 300 mm (11.8 in) for long-distance trains
- 730 mm (28.7 in) for commuter trains
- 500 mm (19.7 in) for shared platform
- For 1,520 mm (4 ft 11 27/32 in) or 1,524 mm (5 ft) broad-gauge lines, passenger platforms shall be as low to 127 mm (5.0 in) above rail should be allowed.

== Gallery ==
Selected passenger train operators

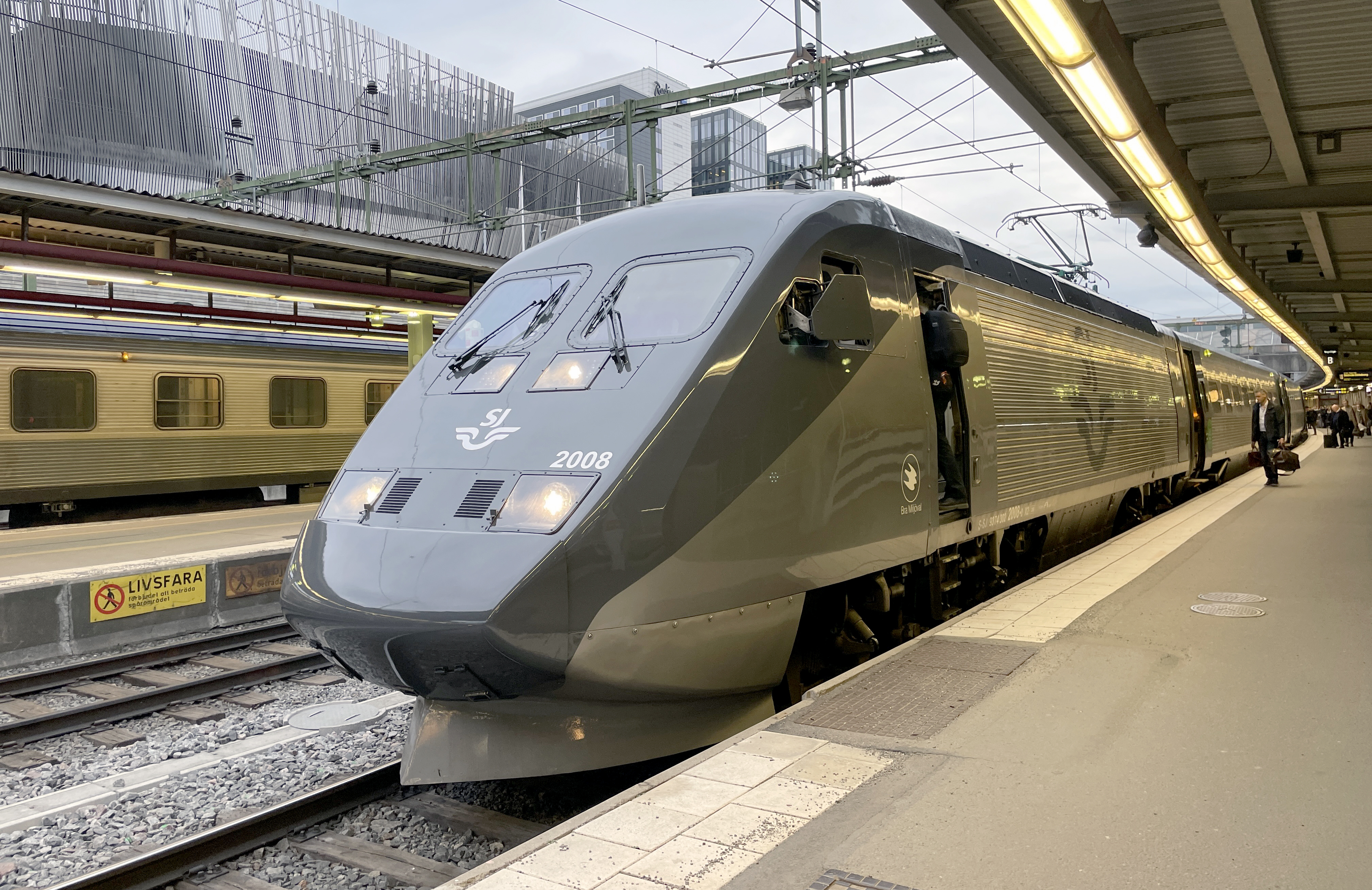
Refurbished SJ X2000 at Stockholm Central Station

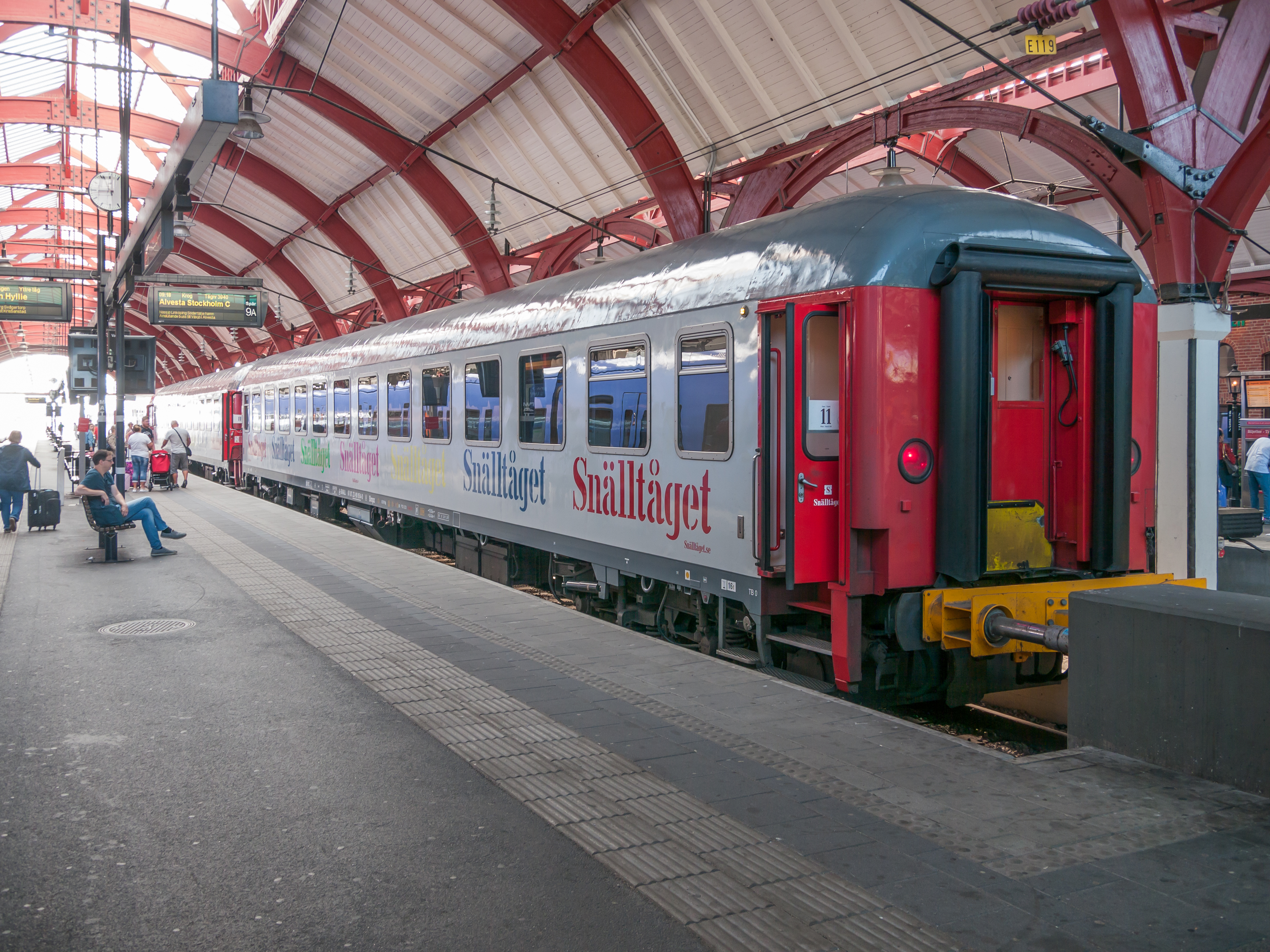
Snälltåget Passenger cars at Malmö Central Station

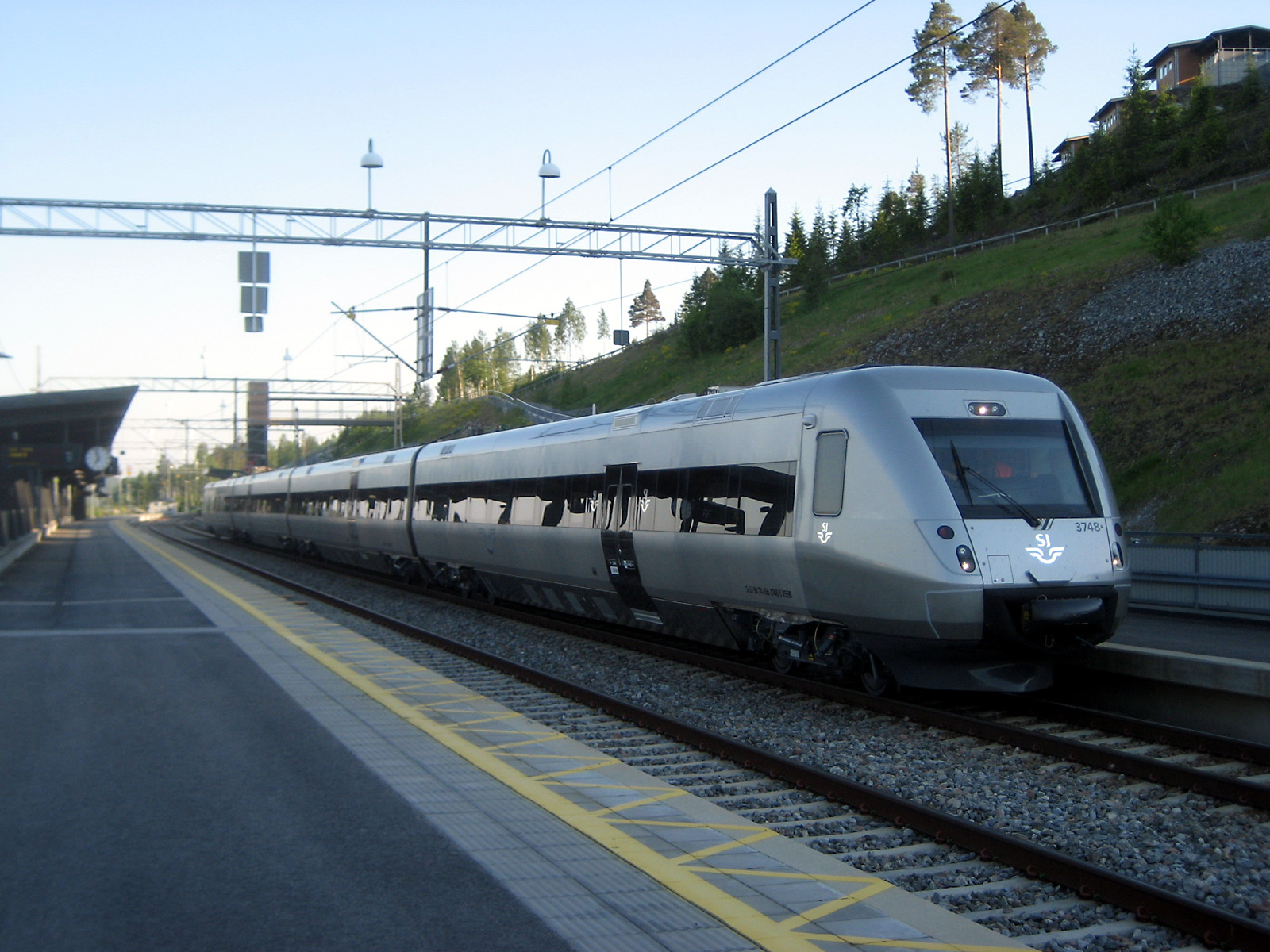
SJ 3000 at Örnsköldsvik Central Station

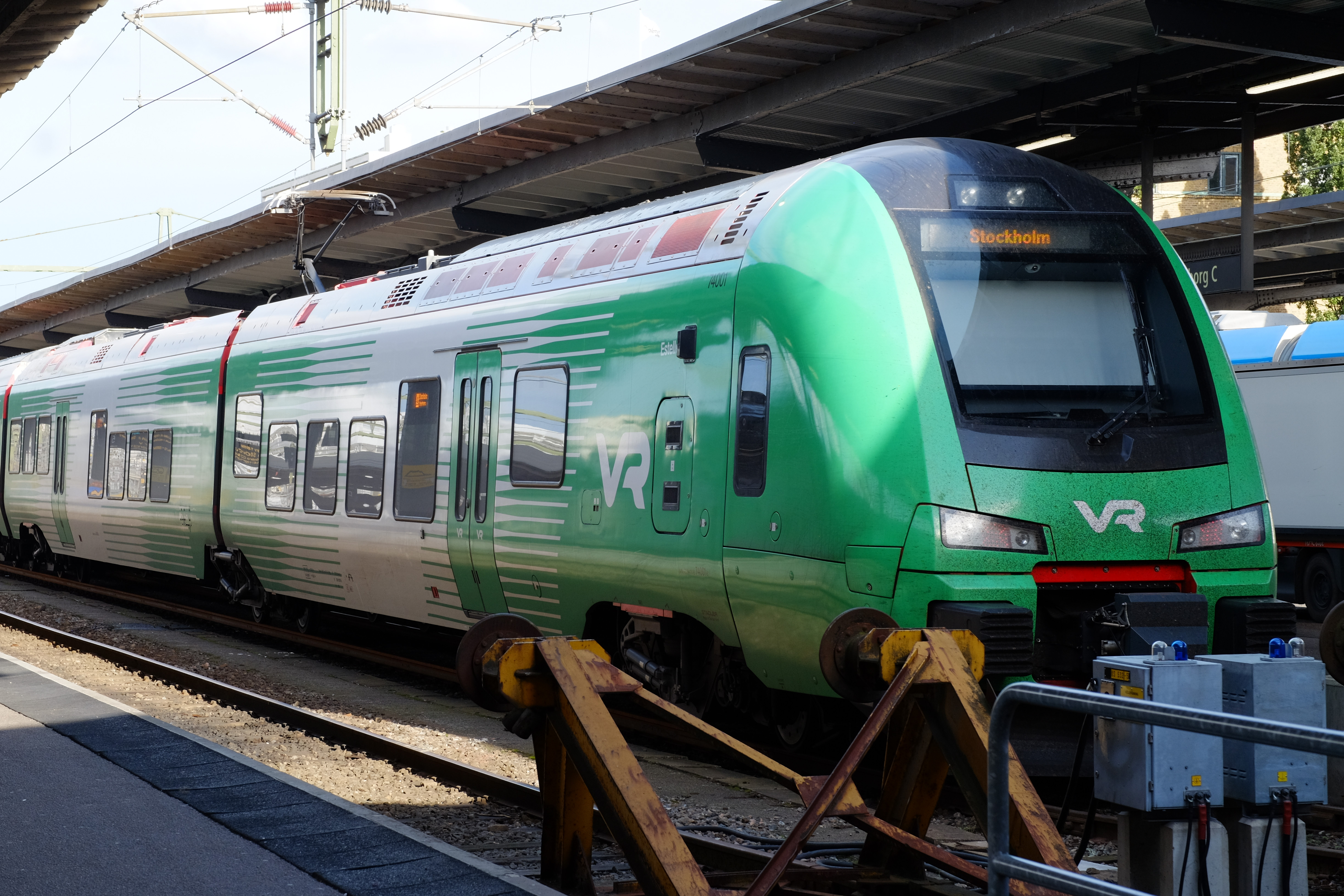
VR Snabbtåg Sverige's X74 at Gothenburg Central Station

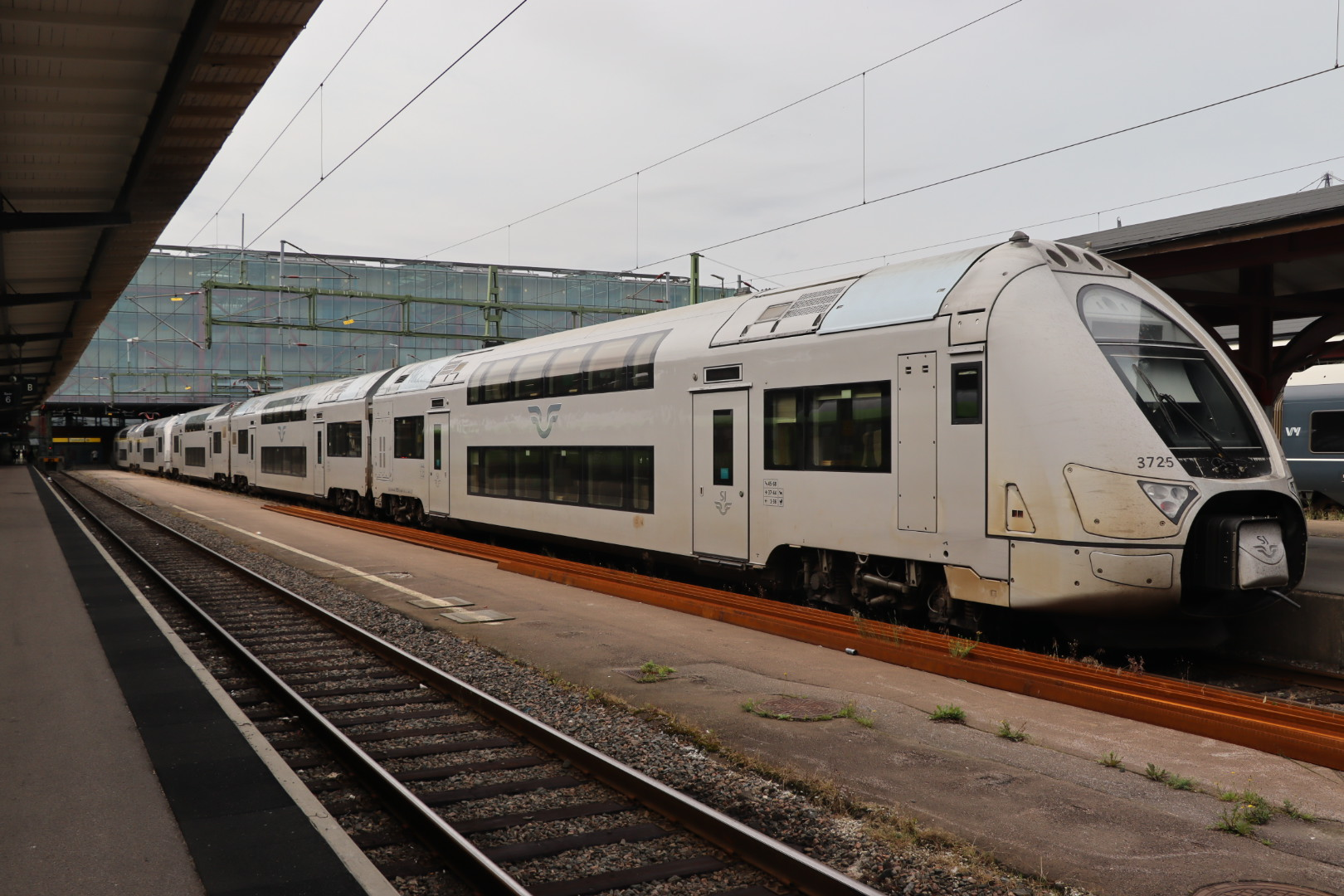
SJ X40 at Gothenburg Central Station

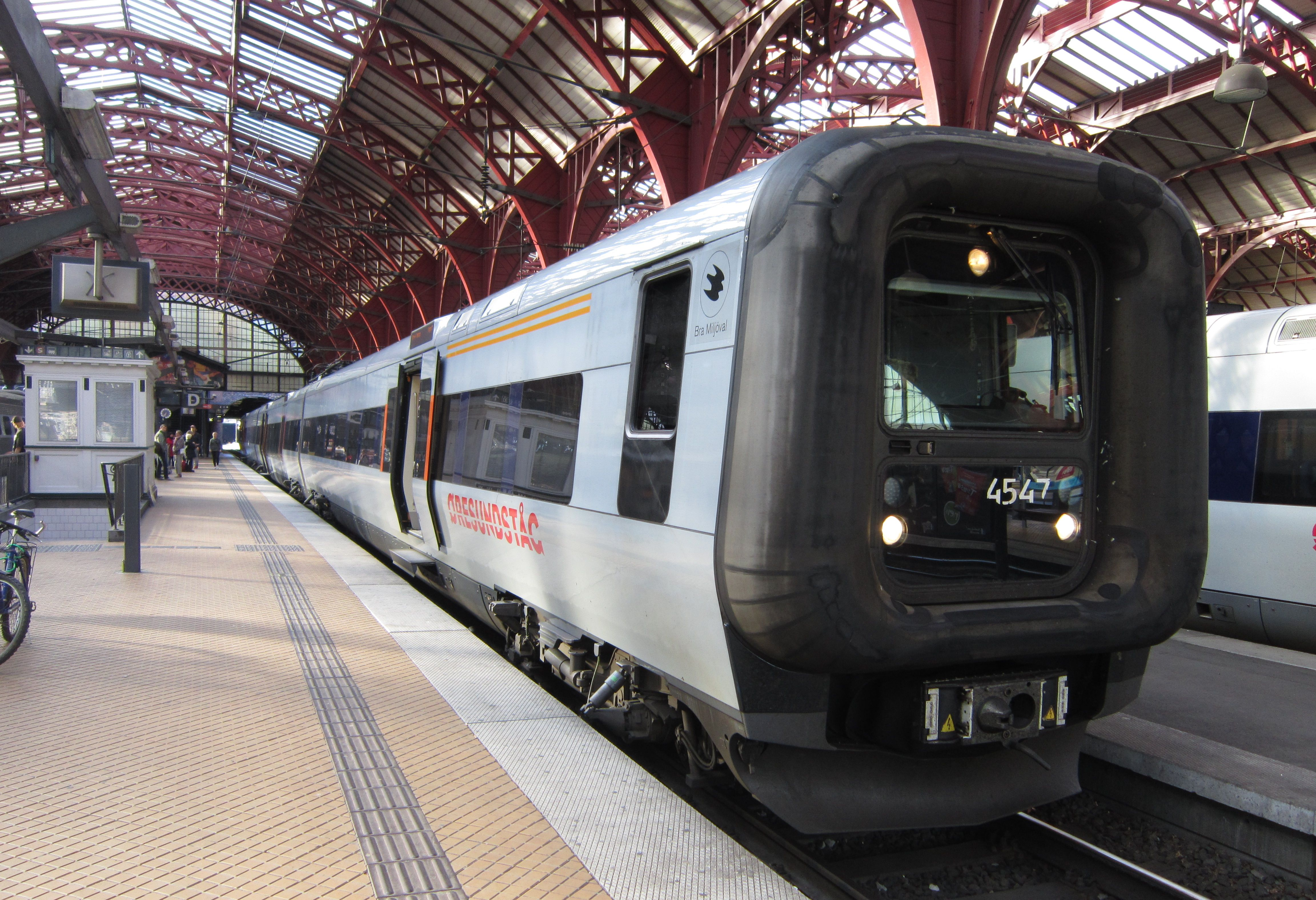
Unrefurbished Øresundståg at Copenhagen Central Station

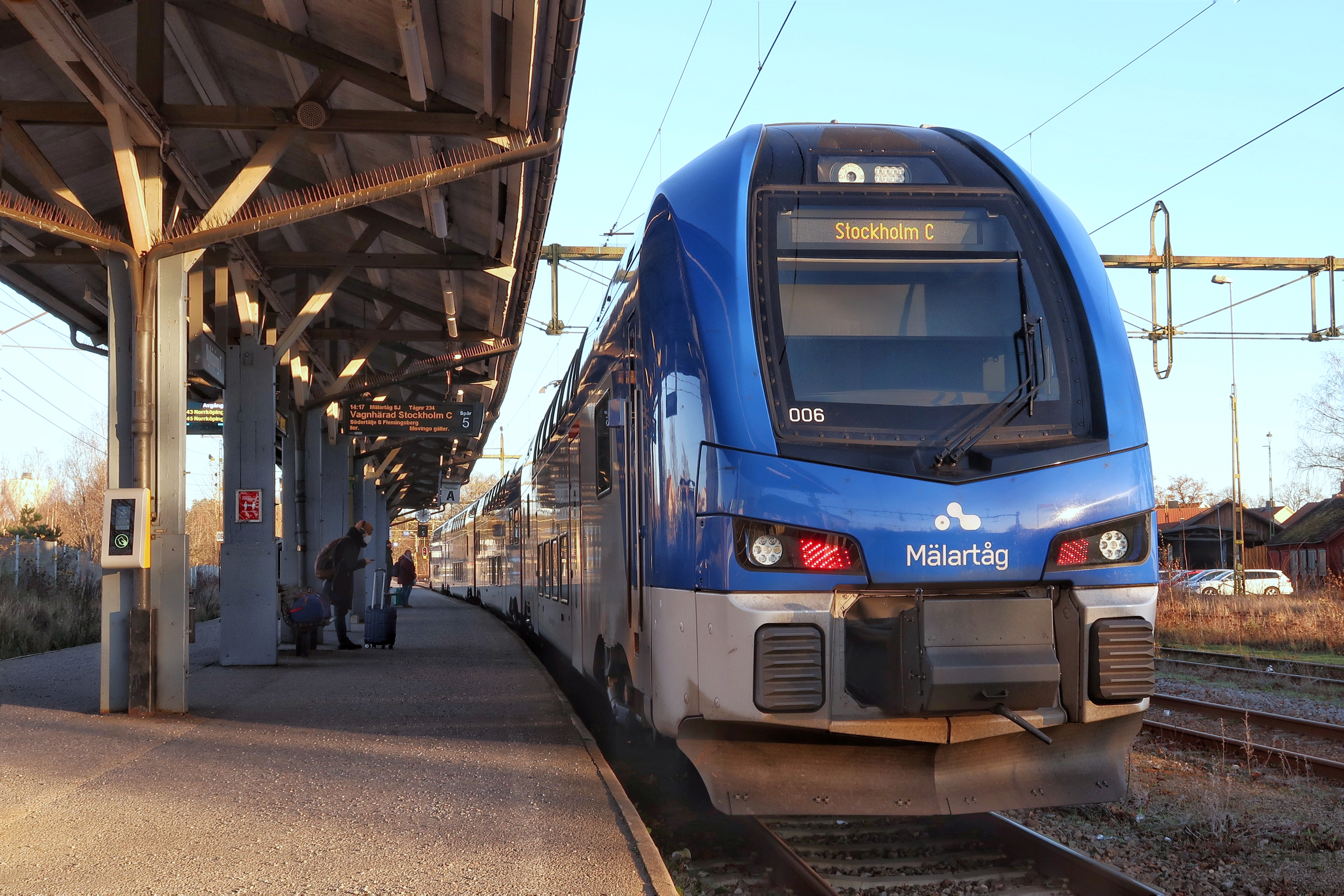
Mälartåg's ER1 train at Nyköping Station

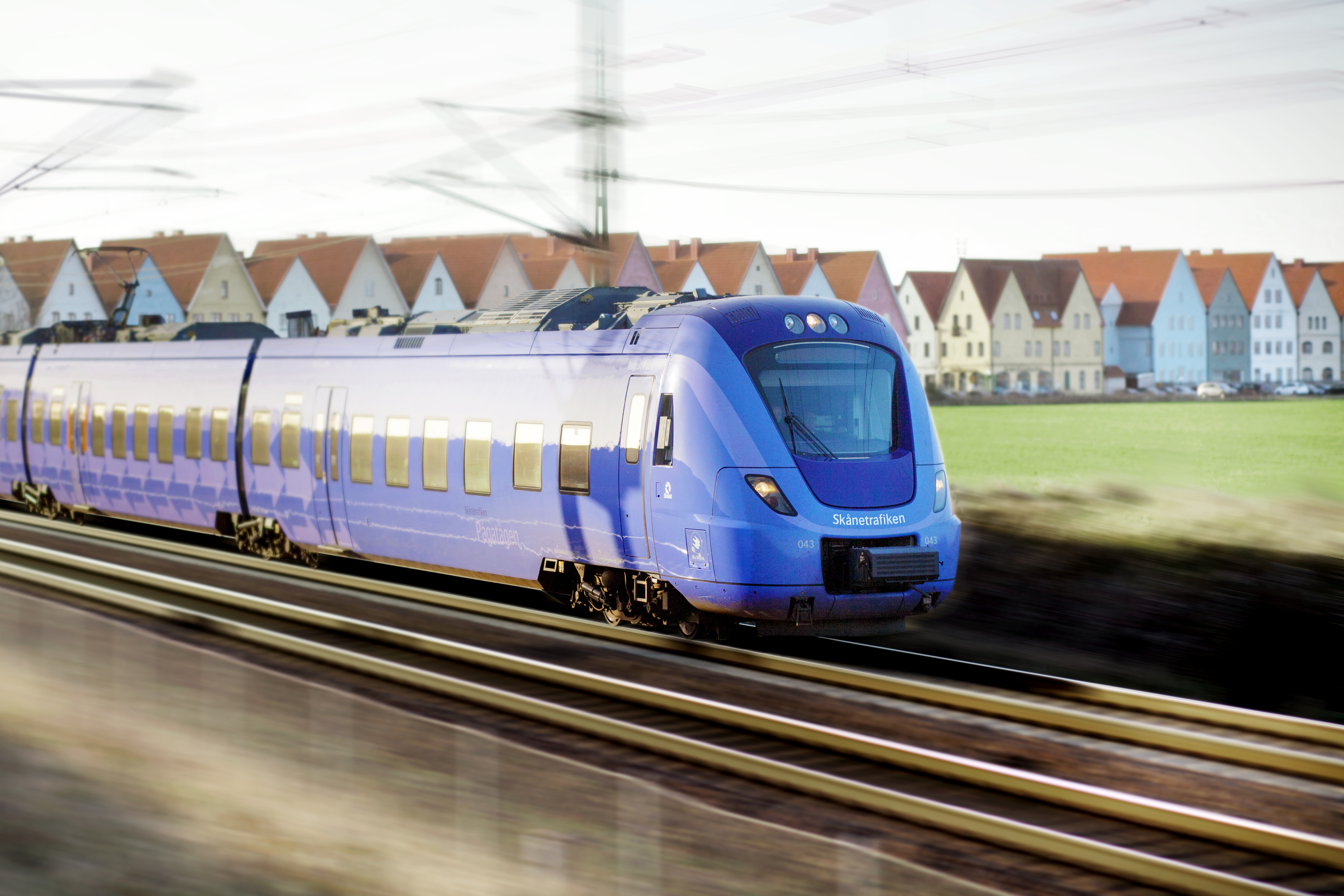
Skånetrafiken's commuter train Pågatåg outside Lund

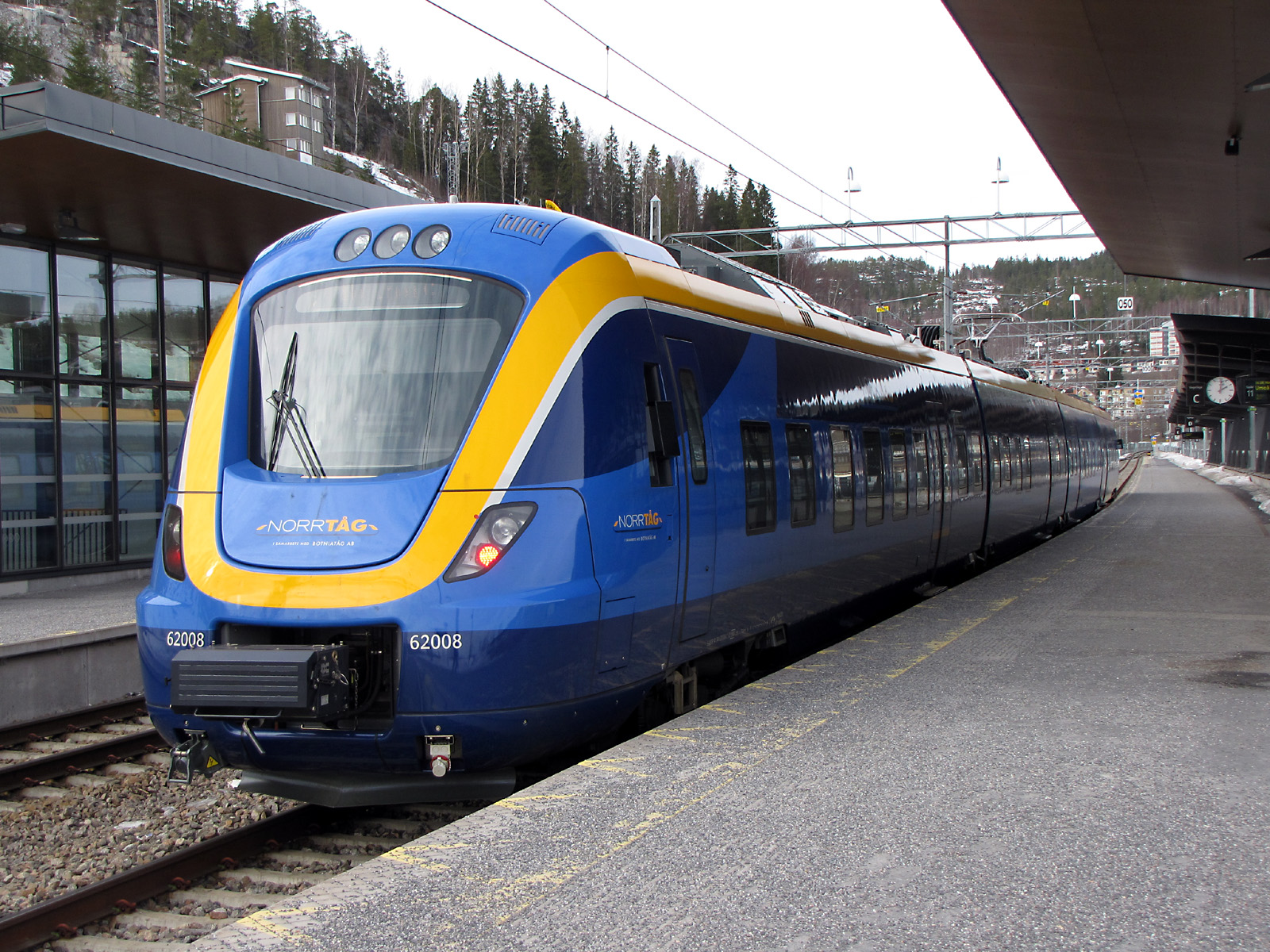
Norrtåg's X62 at Örnsköldsvik Central Station

== See also ==
- Rail transport by country
- High-speed rail in Sweden
- Transportation in Sweden
- Rail transport in Europe
