= TÅGAB =

Swedish railway company

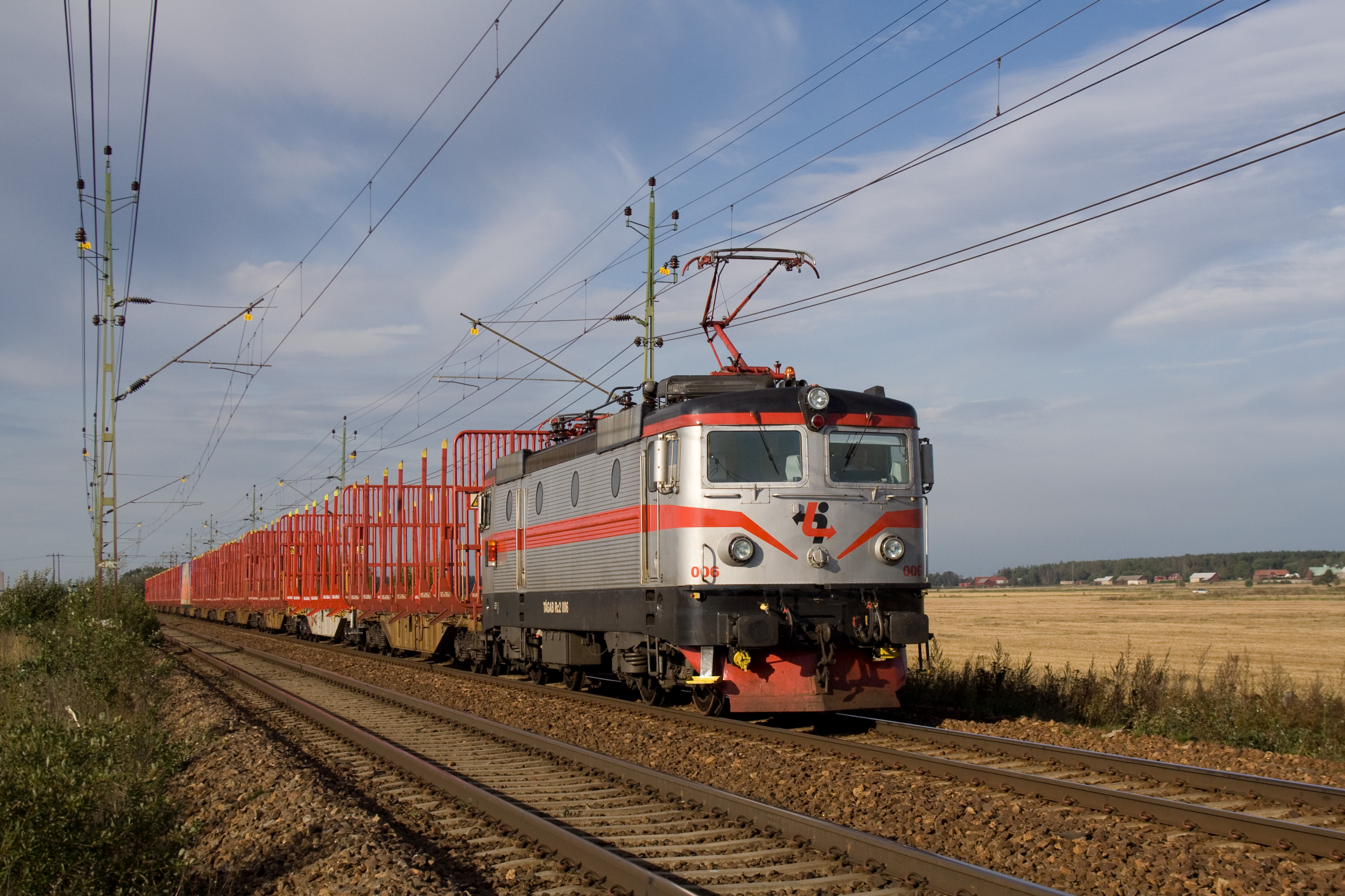
An Rc2 locomotive run by TÅGAB approaching Hallsberg from Örebro with an empty wood train. Photo: David Gubler (2006)

TÅGAB (Tågåkeriet i Bergslagen AB) is a Swedish railway company with headquarters in Kristinehamn. It was started in 1994 and runs trains in both Sweden and Norway.

In 1999, two locomotives (of type SJ T43 and TMY) from the company were painted in the colors of the U.S. Great Northern Railway to participate in Lars von Trier's film Dancer in the Dark, which was set in the United States but filmed in Sweden.
