= SJ B =

Class of Swedish two-cylinder 4-6-0 locomotives

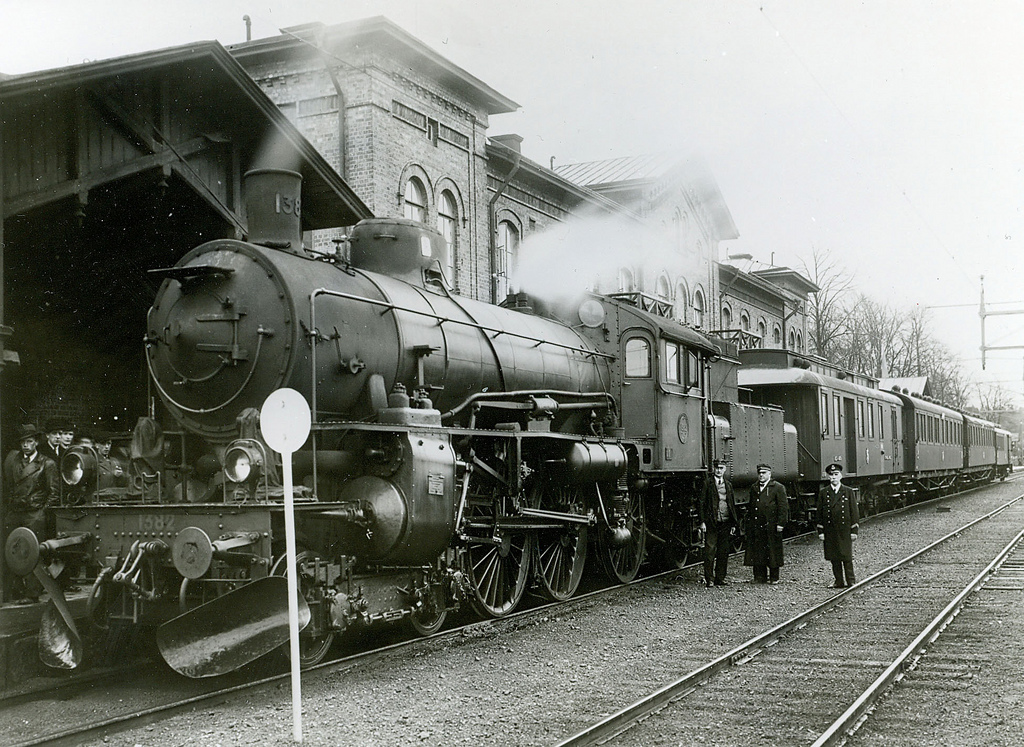
- B 1382 in Arvika in 1937.
Type and origin
- Power type: Steam
- Builder: Motala Verkstad; NOHAB; Svenska Järnvägsverkstäderna
- Build date: 1909–1919, 1943–1944
- Total produced: 99
Specifications
- Configuration
  - Whyte: 4-6-0
  - UIC: 2'C h2
- Gauge: 1,435 mm (4 ft 8 1/2 in) standard gauge
- Leading dia.: 970 mm (3 ft 2 in)
- Driver dia.: 1,750 mm (5 ft 9 in)
- Length: 19,490 mm (63 ft 11 in)
- Loco weight: 70.2 tonnes (69.1 long tons; 77.4 short tons)
- Total weight: 116.8 tonnes (115.0 long tons; 128.7 short tons)
- Fuel type: Coal; Fuel oil
- Fuel capacity: 6.0 tonnes (5.9 long tons; 6.6 short tons)
- Water cap.: 20.0 m^{3} (4,400 imp gal; 5,300 US gal)
- Cylinders: Two
- Cylinder size: 590 mm × 620 mm (23.2 in × 24.4 in)
Performance figures
- Maximum speed: 90 km/h (56 mph)
- Tractive effort: 9.6 Mp (94 kN; 21,000 lbf)
Career
- Operators: Statens Järnvägar; Bergslagernas Järnvägar; Helsingborg–Hässleholms Järnväg; Inlandsbanan AB; Södra Dalarnes Järnväg; Stockholm–Nynäs Järnväg; Stockholm–Västerås–Bergslagens Järnväg
- Number in class: 99
- Numbers: 1026–1697 (with gaps)
- Disposition: Thirty-eight preserved, remainder scrapped
- Data is with A class tender. References

The B class of the Swedish State Railways (SJ) was a type of steam locomotive for mixed traffic, introduced in 1909. 96 locomotives were built for SJ by between 1909 and 1919. The 4-6-0 B class was part of the development of modern superheated locomotives that had begun with the A class in 1906. Intended for fast freight trains and heavy stopping passenger trains, they proved to be versatile, and remained in use for all types of traffic until the end of steam operations in Sweden.

Eleven B class locomotives were sold to private railways during the 1930s, but all but one returned to SJ after the railway companies had been nationalized in the 1940s. One of the private operators, Stockholm–Västerås–Bergslagens Järnväg, had three more locomotives of the same type built, the last one in 1944. Most B class locomotives were eventually rebuilt with fully enclosed cabs, and some were equipped for oil-firing after the Second World War.

When the locomotives became unnecessary in day-to-day operations they were placed in the strategic reserve. Some locomotives from the reserve were reactivated during the winter of 1965–1966 due to a temporary shortage of electric locomotives. Most survived into the 1990s, and several have been preserved by the Swedish Railway Museum and preservation societies in Sweden, while sales to heritage railways abroad failed to reach the expected numbers.

== Design ==
The B class mixed-traffic locomotives were part of the development of modern superheated locomotives that had begun with the A class in 1906 and the E class in 1907. The B class had bar frames, like the A class, and the leading bogie was based on that of the A class. Intended for fast freight trains and heavy passenger trains, the locomotives had six 1,750-millimetre (5 ft 9 in) driving wheels and large outside cylinders, giving a 50% larger starting tractive effort than for the A class. They were capable of doing 90 kilometres per hour (56 mph) on flat ground and 50 km/h (31 mph) on long 1 in 100 gradients.

The B class shared some characteristics with another 4-6-0 mixed-traffic locomotive, the Prussian P 8 class, and several sources state that they were based on the P 8, but another author describes them as "Swedish throughout".

A new type of boiler was designed for the B class; it was also used for the Gb class, and became known as the BGb type. Some other kinds of locomotives were later rebuilt with this type of boiler, creating the A2, Ga2, Ga4 and Mc classes. The boiler was given a high position.

== History ==
96 locomotives were built for SJ by Motala Verkstad, NOHAB and Vagn och Maskinfabriken Falun between 1909 and 1919; three more were built later for a private railway company. A very successful design, the B class turned out to be highly useful for all types of traffic. They were frequently used in heavy express trains, in addition to the intended passenger and freight train services.

Nevertheless, mainline electrification meant that the need for steam locomotives declined in the 1930s, making it possible to sell some B class locomotives to private railways, while some others were placed in reserve. This changed with rising international tensions: the B class locomotives were deemed to be "valuable in wartime conditions", and as such included in a 1938 refurbishment program. The locomotives that had been in reserve were quickly returned to service.

At least four locomotives were leased to the Norwegian State Railways during the German occupation of Norway.

Some modifications were made on the B class locomotives. Most were eventually given fully enclosed cabs, but a few were sold before being rebuilt. All locomotives built for SJ were delivered with A class tenders, but some were later given six-wheeled tenders of the C, C2 and L types and a type inherited from private Helsingborg–Hässleholms Järnväg. The shorter six-wheeled tenders made it possible to turn the locomotives on smaller turntables. Some B class locomotives were equipped for oil-firing after the Second World War. The fireboxes were not optimal for this purpose, having been designed for coal-firing, but the results were mostly satisfactory. Today, preserved oil-fired locomotives are popular for use in summer railtours, as they are less likely than coal-fired locomotives to cause wildfires.

The class remained in service with SJ until the end of revenue service by steam locomotives in Sweden. The need for steam locomotives declined again in the post-war era, but a large number of surplus locomotives were preserved in the strategic reserve, kept in usable condition to replace diesel-powered vehicles if the import of oil was interrupted or electric vehicles if the power supply was destroyed. The use of the reserve locomotives was mostly limited to a few trial runs, but harsh weather in the winter of 1965–1966 meant that an unusually large number of electric locomotives were out of service, and B, E and E2 class locomotives in the reserve were reactivated to haul trains on the electrified lines from Alvesta to Kalmar and Karlskrona.

The B class, together with the E, E2 and E10 classes, remained in the strategic reserve after most other types had been scrapped in the 1970s. Most of the locomotives were placed in sealed plastic bags with dehumidifiers to reduce the need of maintenance. A large number of B class locomotives were preserved in that manner until all steam locomotives were removed from the strategic reserve in 1990.

=== Private operators ===
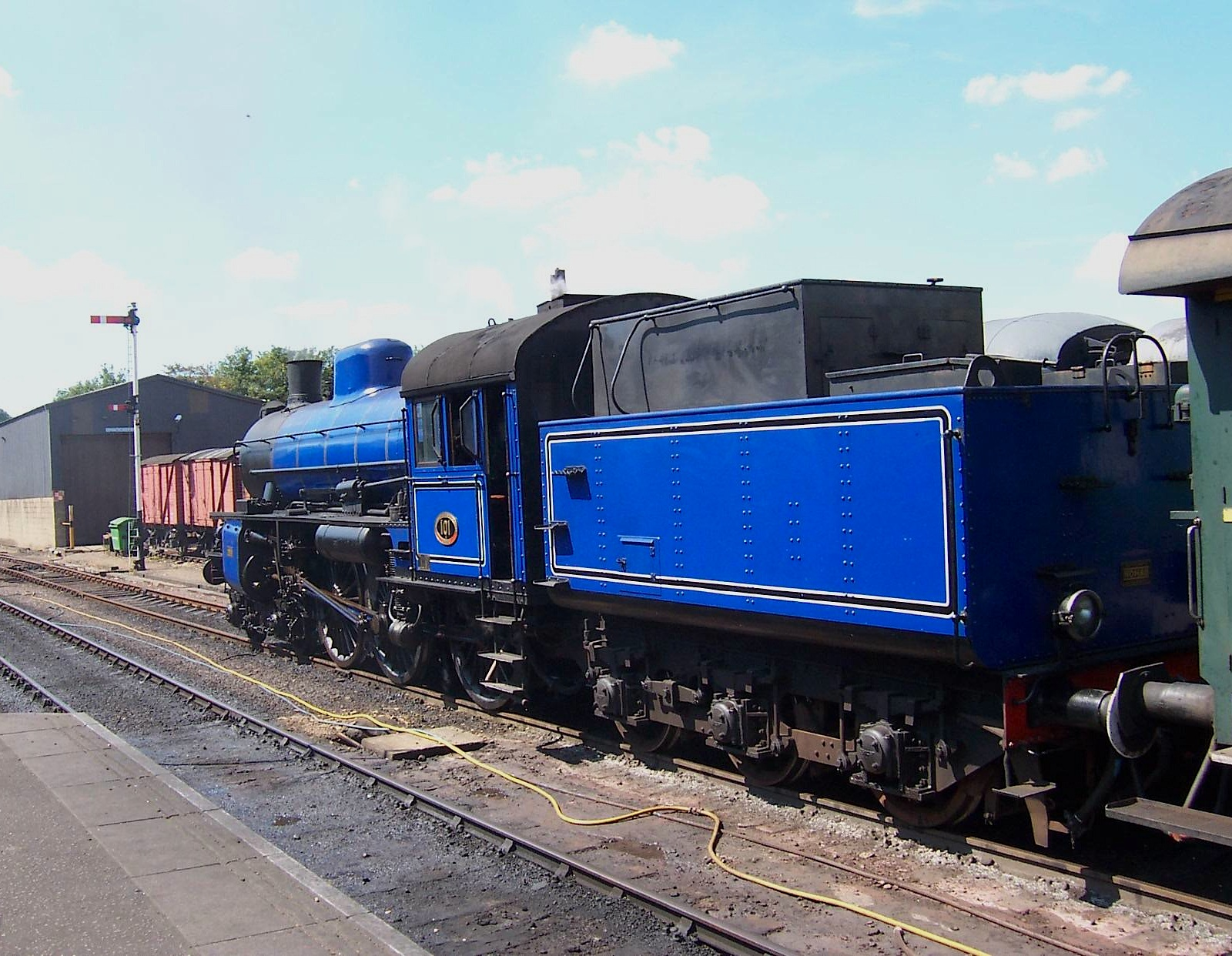
SWB A2 101 has been preserved at the Nene Valley Railway in a non-authentic livery. The locomotives built for SWB were delivered with six-wheeled tenders of this type.

Six B class locomotives were sold to Bergslagernas Järnvägar (BJ) in 1935–1937, and four to Stockholm–Västerås–Bergslagens Järnväg (SWB) in 1936–1937. Three locomotives were soon transferred from BJ to close cooperator Södra Dalarnes Järnväg (SDJ), but it is unclear if they were ever formally registered with that company. All these locomotives returned to SJ when the railways were nationalized in the 1940s, but the former SWB locomotives remained on the network of that company until electrification. The type was known as the B3 class at BJ and as the A class (A1 from 1943) at SWB. The cost to purchase one locomotive in used condition was 85,000 Swedish crowns; a similar amount was then needed to refurbish the locomotives before they could be used.

Another B class locomotive was sold to Helsingborg–Hässleholms Järnväg (HHJ) in 1936, but was not intended to be used. Having been overhauled by HHJ, it was traded to BJ the year after for a H3 class locomotive. BJ sold it in 1947 to Stockholm–Nynäs Järnväg (SNJ), where it was given number 12, later changed to 2. SNJ had it modified for oil firing, as SJ demanded this to allow the steam locomotives of SNJ on the electrified tracks into Stockholm Central Station. The locomotive was scrapped in 1960 without having been reintegrated into the SJ fleet.

The B3 class differed from other locomotives of BJ, as the driver's position never was moved from the left to the right side. They were in fact hardly modified at all during their time on BJ, meaning that two former BJ locomotives are the only ones preserved in nearly original condition. SWB did make some modifications on their locomotives: the sandboxes were moved, and the blastpipes were modified, increasing the production of steam. SWB bought used C class tenders from SJ to their locomotives, and the original A class tenders were rebuilt to tank wagons.

Despite the purchase of the A1 class, SWB had too few 4-6-0 locomotives for their passenger trains. Three new A2 class locomotives were built by NOHAB in 1943–1944, based on the SJ B class. Some minor improvements were made, including fully enclosed cabs and the use of roller bearings. They were delivered with the modified sandbox position, but with unmodified blastpipes; the latter were quickly changed. The tender was of a new design, slightly larger than the C class tender, known as the B class after nationalization before being grouped with other six-wheeled tender types under the C3 designation. The former A2 class locomotives, known post nationalization a B class number 1695–1697, were last used in the 1960s in freight trains in the Dalarna region, where they were described by one driver as "the best steam locomotives ever built".

== Preservation ==
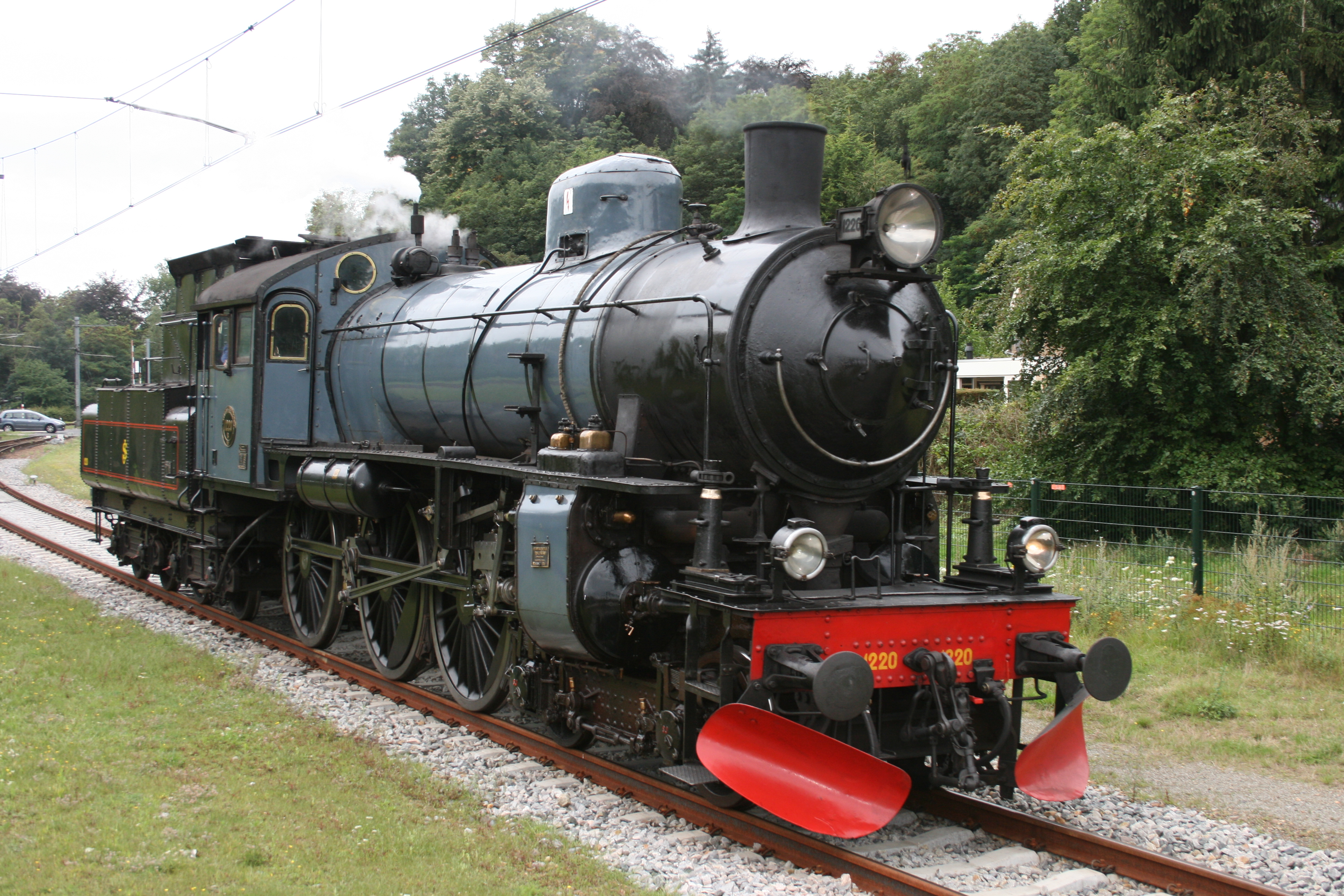
B 1220 in operation at the ZLSM in the Netherlands.

The long use of the B class in the strategic reserve meant that a large number of the locomotives survived into the 1990s, and nearly half of them have been preserved. Many locomotives remained in storage long after they had officially been removed from the strategic reserve, and interested buyers could inspect the locomotives to find the ones that were in the best condition; 38 locomotives were allocated to the Swedish Railway Museum and various heritage railways and preservation societies, although a few have been scrapped later.

There were hopes that the remaining locomotives could be sold to foreign heritage railways, but the fall of communism meant that many attractive steam locomotives were available at even lower prices in Eastern Europe. A few were sold nevertheless: B 1220 and 1289 are at the Zuid-Limburgse Stoomtrein Maatschappij (ZLSM) in the Netherlands, and SWB A2 101 at Nene Valley Railway in the United Kingdom. SJ B 1149, also known as SWB A1 96, was sold to the Belfast and Moosehead Lake Railroad in Maine, United States, which became the Belfast and Moosehead Lake Railroad (2009), which sold it in 2010 to the Great Smoky Mountains Railroad which in turn sold it in 2013 to the Discovery Park of America in Tennessee.

Some locomotives that had been in storage along the Inland Line were taken over by Inlandsbanan AB (IBAB), the commercial operator on that line, and B 1384 has been refurbished for use in tourist trains together with an E2 class locomotive.

== Locomotive List ==
Number	Manufacturer	Built	(Last known) Location / Owner	Current status	Image	Notes
B 1026	Motala	1909	Motala municipality	On static display		
B 1027	Motala	1910	Unknown	Unknown		
B 1028	Motala	1910	Karlskoga	Scrapped (1978)		
B 1034	Motala	1910	Unknown	Unknown		
B 1035	Motala	1910	Unknown	Unknown		
B 1036	Motala	1910	Gävle	Unknown		Strategic steam reserve locomotive
B 1037	Motala	1910	Gothenburg	Stored out of use		Strategic steam reserve locomotive
B 1038	Motala	1910	Nässjö Järnvägsmuseum	Operational		
B 1081	Motala	1911	Norrköping	Unknown		
B 1082	Motala	1911	Gävle	Unknown		Strategic steam reserve locomotive
B 1083	Motala	1911	Bergslagernas Järnvägssällskap	Unknown		BJ B3 130, SDJ B3 130
B 1084	Motala	1911	Grängesbergsbanornas Järnvägsmuseum, Grängesberg	Scrapped, smokebox preserved		Strategic steam reserve locomotive
B 1085	Motala	1911	Malmbanans Vänner	Operational		Strategic steam reserve locomotive
B 1106	Motala	1911	Gävle	Unknown		
B 1107	Motala	1911	Gothenburg	Unknown		
B 1108	Motala	1911	Herrljunga	Unknown		Strategic steam reserve locomotive
B 1135	Motala	1912	Swedish Railway Museum, Gävle	On static display		Strategic steam reserve locomotive
B 1136	Motala	1912	Nynäshamns Järnvägsmuseum	Not currently operational		
B 1137	Motala	1912	Norrköping	Unknown		
B 1138	Nohab	1912	Bergslagernas Järnvägssällskap	Scrapped (1999)		
B 1139	Nohab	1912	Alvesta	Scrapped (2010)		
B 1140	Nohab	1912	Växjö	Unknown		Strategic steam reserve locomotive
B 1141	Nohab	1913	Malmö	Unknown		
B 1142	Motala	1913	Unknown	Unknown		
B 1143	Motala	1913	Värmlandståg, Fryksta	Unknown		SWB A 95
B 1144	Motala	1913	Grängesberg	Scrapped (1994)		Strategic steam reserve locomotive
B 1145	Motala	1913	Gävle	Unknown		
B 1146	Nohab	1913	Gothenburg	Unknown		BJ B3 127
B 1147	Nohab	1913	Alcatraz entertainment hall, Luleå	Unknown		BJ B3 128
B 1148	Nohab	1913	High Chaparral, Kulltorp	Unknown		
B 1149	Nohab	1913	Discovery Park of America	On static display		SWB A 96
B 1150	Nohab	1913	Gävle	Scrapped (2013)		BJ B3 131, SDJ B3 131
B 1219	Nohab	1914	Vännäs	Unknown		
B 1220	Nohab	1914	Zuid-Limburgse Stoomtrein Maatschappij (ZLSM)	On static display (awaiting overhaul)		
B 1221	Nohab	1914	Bollnäs	Unknown		
B 1222	Motala	1914	Norrbotten Railway Museum	Operational		Strategic steam reserve locomotive
B 1223	Motala	1914	Gävle	Scrapped (2011)		
B 1266	Motala	1915	Schultz Recycling GmbH, Kropp	On static display		
B 1267	Motala	1915	Nora	Operational		SWB A 97, Strategic steam reserve locomotive
B 1268	Motala	1915	Kusfors	On static display		BJ B3 133
B 1269	Motala	1916	Kiruna	Unknown		Strategic steam reserve locomotive
B 1270	Motala	1916	Gävle	Unknown		Strategic steam reserve locomotive
B 1281	Motala	1916	Grängesbergsbanornas Järnvägsmuseum, Grängesberg	Operational		BJ B3 132, SDJ B3 132
B 1282	Motala	1916	Mora municipality	On static display		
B 1283	Motala	1916	Swedish Railway Museum, Gävle	On static display		
B 1284	Motala	1916	Boden	Scrapped		Strategic steam reserve locomotive
B 1285	Motala	1916	Växjö	Scrapped		Strategic steam reserve locomotive
B 1286	Nohab	1916	Unknown	Unknown		
B 1287	Nohab	1916	Härnösand Bilmuseum	On static display		Named Astrid
B 1288	Nohab	1916	Växjö	Scrapped		
B 1289	Nohab	1916	Zuid-Limburgse Stoomtrein Maatschappij (ZLSM)	undergoing restoration		
B 1290	Nohab	1916	Grängesbergsbanornas Järnvägsmuseum, Grängesberg	On static display		
B 1311	Motala	1916	Gävle	Unknown		
B 1312	Motala	1916	Landeryds Järnvägsmuseum, Landeryd	Operational (?)		
B 1313	Motala	1917	Lincolnshire Wolds Railway	On static display (awaiting overhaul)		
B 1314	Motala	1917	Gävle	Operational (?)		
B 1315	Motala	1917	Hedsjön	Unknown		
B 1316	Motala	1917	Ängelholm	Undergoing boiler overhaul		
B 1317	Motala	1917	Växjö	Scrapped		Strategic steam reserve locomotive
B 1318	Nohab	1917	Malmö	Unknown		
B 1319	Nohab	1917	Växjö	Scrapped		Strategic steam reserve locomotive
B 1320	Nohab	1917	Trollhättan	On static display		
B 1321	Nohab	1917	Kalmar	Scrapped (1973)		Strategic steam reserve locomotive
B 1322	Nohab	1917	Västerås	Unknown		
B 1323	Nohab	1917	Stockholms Kultursällskap för Ånga och Järnväg, Krylbo	Operational		
B 1324	Nohab	1917	Museiföreningen Gefle-Dala Jernväg, Falun	Operational		
B 1325	Nohab	1917	Unknown	Scrapped		
B 1364	Nohab	1918	Stockholms Ånlokssällskap	On static display		
B 1365	Nohab	1918	Unknown	Unknown		
B 1366	Nohab	1918	Norrköping	On static display (?)		
B 1367	Nohab	1918	Norrköping	On static display (?)		
B 1368	Nohab	1918	Örebro	Scrapped		
B 1369	Nohab	1918	Grådö	On static display		Privately owned
B 1370	Nohab	1918	Malmö	Unknown		
B 1371	Nohab	1918	Museiföreningen Gefle-Dala Jernväg, Falun	On static display		
B 1372	Nohab	1918	Unknown	Unknown		
B 1373	Nohab	1918	Unknown	Unknown		
B 1374	Nohab	1918	Jörn	Unknown		
B 1375	Nohab	1918	Unknown	Unknown		
B 1376	Nohab	1918	Gävle	Scrapped		Strategic steam reserve locomotive
B 1377	ASJ-F	1919	Västerås	Scrapped		Strategic steam reserve locomotive
B 1378	ASJ-F	1919	Luleå	Scrapped (1979)		Strategic steam reserve locomotive
B 1379	ASJ-F	1919	Museiföreningen Gefle-Dala Jernväg, Falun	Out of service		Strategic steam reserve locomotive
B 1380	ASJ-F	1919	Boden	Unknown		SWB A 98, Strategic steam reserve locomotive
B 1381	ASJ-F	1919	Duvetorp	Scrapped		Strategic steam reserve locomotive
B 1382	ASJ-F	1919	Boden	On static display		
B 1383	ASJ-F	1919	Falun	Unknown		
B 1384	Motala	1918	Swedish Railway Museum, Gävle	Unknown		
B 1385	Motala	1918	Vislanda	Scrapped		
B 1386	Motala	1918	Vännäs	Scrapped		Strategic steam reserve locomotive
B 1387	Motala	1918	Boden	Unknown		Strategic steam reserve locomotive
B 1428	Motala	1919	Swedish Railway Museum, Gävle	Operational		Strategic steam reserve locomotive
B 1429	Motala	1919	Ängelholm	On static display		
B 1430	Motala	1919	Grängesbergsbanornas Järnvägsmuseum, Grängesberg	Scrapped, boiler stored for TGOJ Gb 95		
B 1431	Motala	1919	Växjö	Unknown		
B 1432	Motala	1919	Narvik	Unknown		
B 1695 (SWB A2 99)	Nohab	1943	Nora	Unknown		
B 1696 (SWB A2 100)	Nohab	1943	Stockholms Kultursällskap för Ånga och Järnväg	Unknown		
B 1697 (SWB A2 101)	Nohab	1944	Nene Valley Railway	On static display		
