= SJ E =

Class of Swedish steam locomotives

SJ E, E5
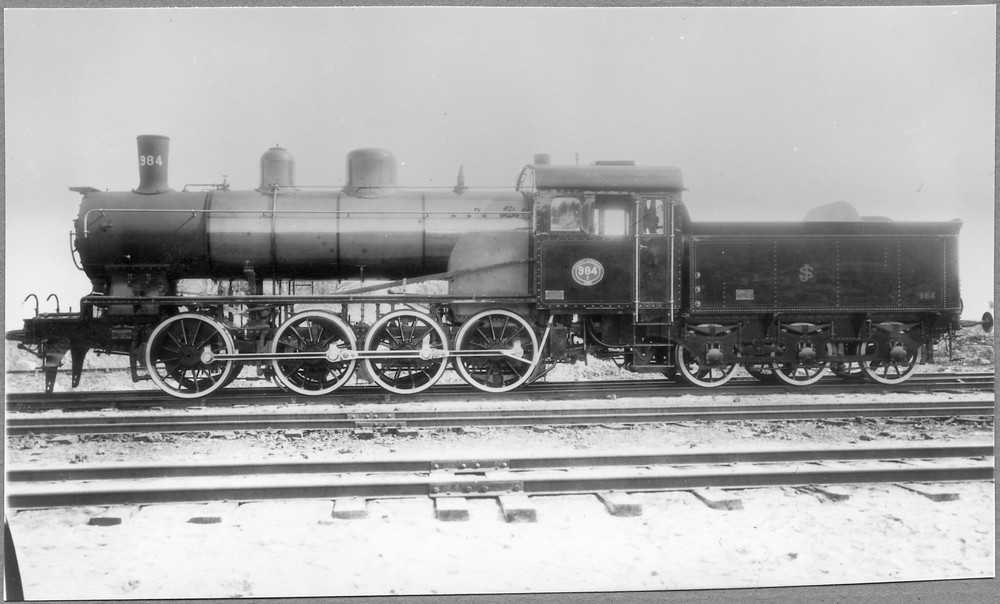
- E 984 as built.
Type and origin
- Power type: Steam
- Build date: 1907–1920
Specifications
- Configuration
  - Whyte: 0-8-0
  - UIC: D h2
- Gauge: 1,435 mm (4 ft 8 1/2 in) standard gauge
- Driver dia.: 1,388 mm (4 ft 6.6 in)
- Length: 16,650 mm (54 ft 8 in)
- Loco weight: E: 50.0 tonnes (49.2 long tons; 55.1 short tons); E5: 51.6–52.1 t (50.8–51.3 long tons; 56.9–57.4 short tons)
- Total weight: E: 83.6 tonnes (82.3 long tons; 92.2 short tons); E5: 84.3–84.8 t (83.0–83.5 long tons; 92.9–93.5 short tons)
- Fuel type: Coal
- Fuel capacity: 5.2 tonnes (5.1 long tons; 5.7 short tons)
- Water cap.: 14.0 m^{3} (3,100 imp gal; 3,700 US gal)
- Cylinders: Two
- Cylinder size: 500 mm × 640 mm (19.69 in × 25.20 in)
Performance figures
- Maximum speed: 65 km/h (40 mph)
- Tractive effort: 9.0 Mp (88 kN; 20,000 lbf)
Career
- Operators: Statens Järnvägar; Kalmar Järnväg; Ostkustbanan; Sävsjöström–Nässjö Järnväg; Skåne–Smålands Järnväg; Uddevalla–Vänersborg–Herrljunga Järnväg
- Number in class: 133
- Numbers: 900–1537 (with gaps)
- Data is with original tenders. References

SJ E2
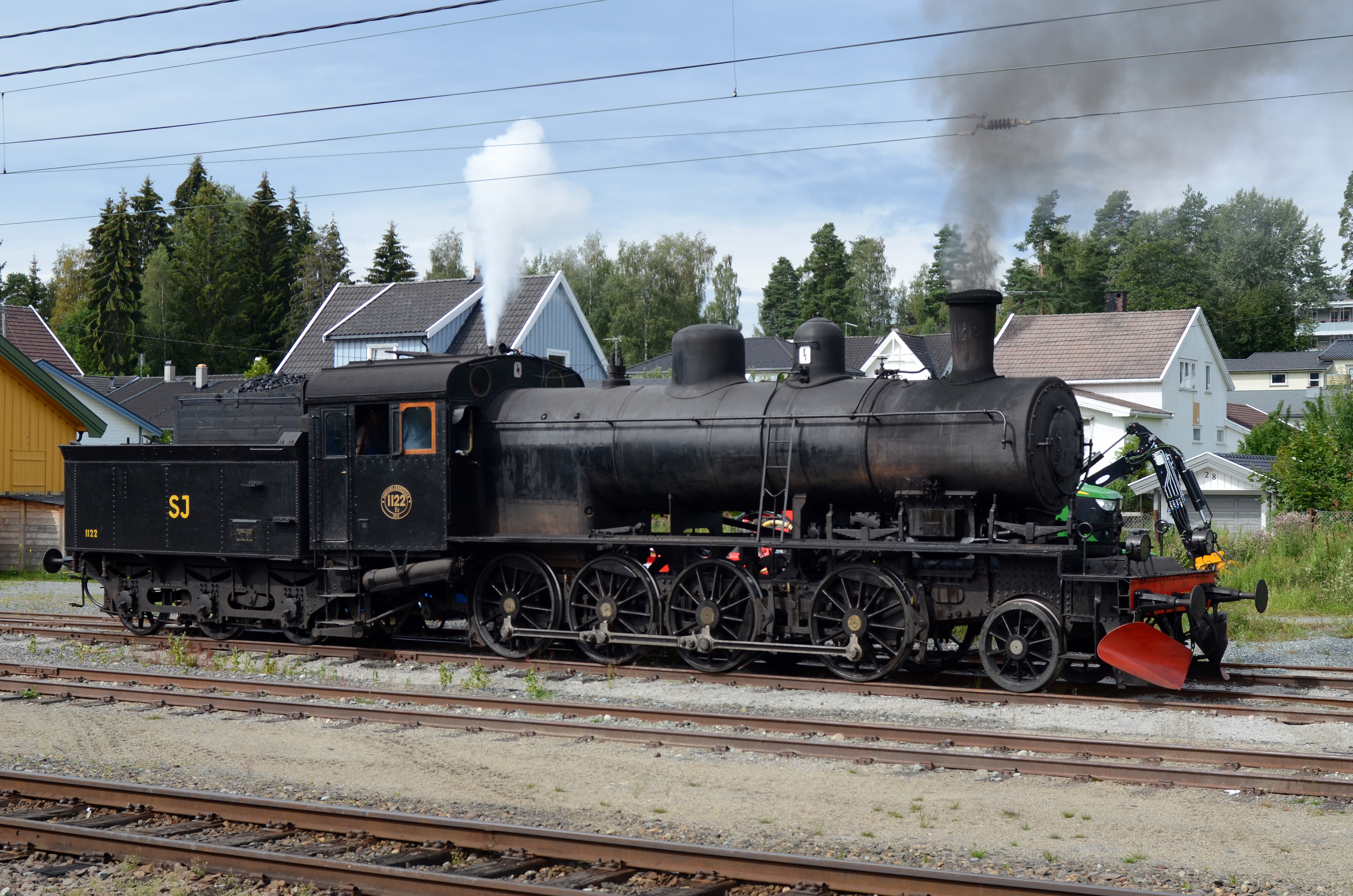
- E2 1122 on the Krøderen Line in 2015.
Type and origin
- Power type: Steam
- Rebuild date: 1935–1951
Specifications
- Configuration
  - Whyte: 2-8-0
  - UIC: 1'D h2
- Leading dia.: 970 mm (3 ft 2 in)
- Driver dia.: 1,388 mm (4 ft 6.6 in)
- Length: 17,650 mm (57 ft 11 in)
- Loco weight: 57.5 tonnes (56.6 long tons; 63.4 short tons)
- Total weight: 91.1 tonnes (89.7 long tons; 100.4 short tons)
Performance figures
- Maximum speed: 70 km/h (43 mph)
Career
- Operators: Statens Järnvägar; Inlandsbanan AB
- Number in class: 90
- Numbers: 903–1463 (with gaps)
- Other data unchanged. References

The E, E2 and E5 classes of the Swedish State Railways (SJ) were three closely related types of steam locomotives. The E class 0-8-0 locomotives were part of the development of modern superheated types that had begun with the A class in 1906, and were intended for both mixed traffic in Norrland and heavy freight trains in southern Sweden. Many of them were rebuilt to the 2-8-0 E2 class between 1935 and 1951, enabling a speed increase from 65 kilometres per hour (40 mph) to 70 km/h (43 mph). Three E class locomotives built for private railways became known as the E5 class following nationalization, as they were slightly heavier than the ones built for SJ.

The E class was ill-suited for hauling express trains, due to their low speed, but they were otherwise used for all types of traffic and in all parts of Sweden. The light axle load meant that they could be used on minor lines and industrial railways, extending their use after mainline steam operations had been reduced. Both E and E2 class locomotives remained in daily service until 31 March 1972, the last day of regular steam operations on SJ. Most were then placed in the strategic reserve, where they remained until 1990, and many have been preserved.

== Design ==
The E class 0-8-0 locomotives were part of the development of modern superheated locomotives that had begun with the A class in 1906. 130 were built between 1907 and 1920. Relatively strong, but with an axle load of only 12.5 tonnes (12.3 long tons; 13.8 short tons), they were intended for mixed traffic in Norrland and heavy freight trains in southern Sweden. The class had bar frames and inside cylinders, and all were delivered with fully enclosed cabs. They were given six-wheeled L class tenders, but some had larger A class tenders in the last years of use, increasing the operation radius.

The boiler designed for the E class was also used for the Sb class tank engines, as SJ wanted to use standard parts for that class. For this reason the boiler was sometimes referred to as the ESb type. The G8 class locomotives were also rebuilt with E type boilers in 1950–1951. One E class locomotive was equipped for burning peat-based fuel for a short time.

The class was very successful, but the low maximum speed (only 65 kilometres per hour (40 mph)) was problematic. 90 locomotives were rebuilt between 1935 and 1951 with two leading wheels, enabling a modest increase to 70 km/h (43 mph). The rebuilt locomotives became one metre (3 ft 3 3/8 in) longer and 7.5 tonnes (7.4 long tons; 8.3 short tons) heavier. The boiler was also moved a bit forward, making even more room in the large cab.

== History ==
The E class was ill-suited for hauling express trains, due to the speed, but they were otherwise used for all types of traffic and in all parts of Sweden. The light axle load meant that they could be used on minor lines and industrial railways, extending their use after mainline steam operations had been reduced. E class locomotives sometimes appeared in Norway, both in cross-border traffic and leased to the Norwegian State Railways. At least one locomotive was in Norway during the German occupation.

Both E and E2 class locomotives remained in daily service until 31 March 1972, the last day of regular steam operations on SJ. The very last train was hauled by E2 1194.

Most of the locomotives were preserved in the strategic reserve when no longer needed in regular traffic, kept in usable condition to replace diesel-powered vehicles if the import of oil was interrupted or electric vehicles if the power supply was destroyed. The use of the reserve locomotives was mostly limited to a few trial runs, but harsh weather in the winter of 1965–1966 meant that an unusually large number of electric locomotives were out of service, and B, E and E2 class locomotives in the reserve were reactivated to haul trains on the electrified lines from Alvesta to Kalmar and Karlskrona.

The E and E2 classes, together with the B and E10 classes, remained in the strategic reserve after most other types had been scrapped in the 1970s. Most of the locomotives were placed in sealed plastic bags with dehumidifiers to reduce the need of maintenance. A large number of E and E2 class locomotives were preserved in that manner until all steam locomotives were removed from the strategic reserve in 1990.

=== Private operators ===
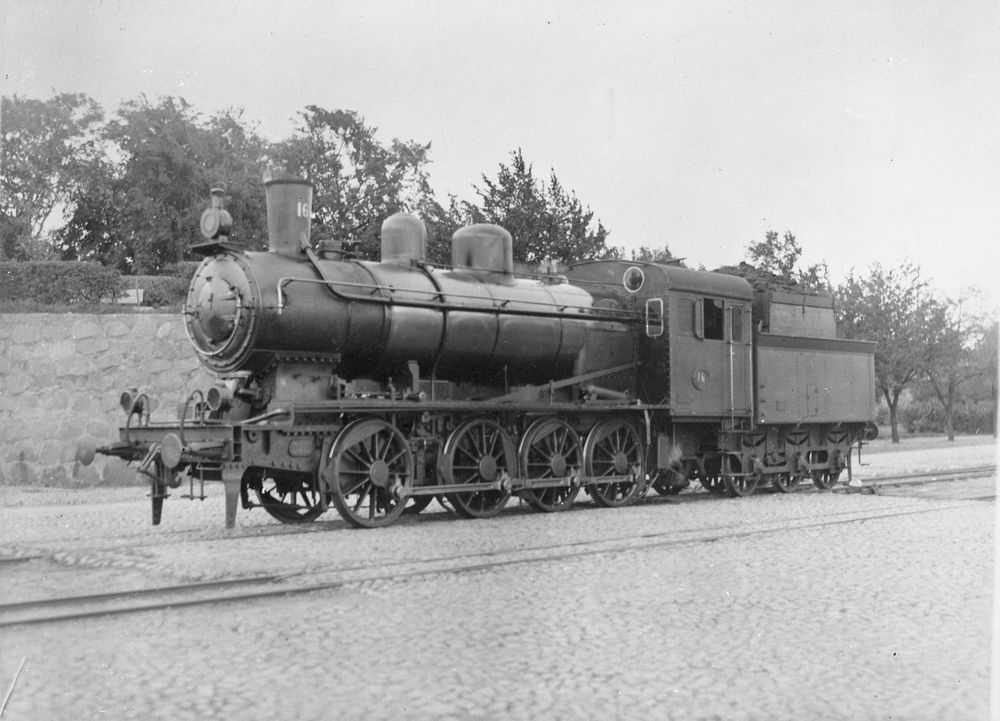
KJ E 16 before nationalization.

Two E class locomotives were delivered to private railway company Kalmar Järnväg (KJ) in 1917. They differed from the SJ locomotives in details and were slightly heavier, with a higher axle load. They also had a different type of tender. Neighboring railway Sävsjöström–Nässjö Järnväg (SäNJ) bought an identical locomotive, but with a larger tender, in 1919. They were registered as SJ E class locomotives following nationalization, but were given their own designation, E5, in 1942. The former SäNJ locomotive was scrapped in 1967 and the KJ ones in the early 1970s after having been in reserve since the 1950s.

The railway between Gävle and Härnösand was built by the private company Ostkustbanan (OKB), the first section opening in 1923. The company was troubled financially from the beginning, and depended on loans from the state; it was controlled by the Swedish government from 1924. As part of the state aid, five A class and twelve E class locomotives were transferred from SJ to OKB before the start of large-scale traffic in 1927, retaining their class designations. They returned when OKB was nationalized in 1933, regaining their old numbers, and some were later rebuilt to the E2 class.

One locomotive was sold to Uddevalla–Vänersborg–Herrljunga Järnväg (UVHJ) in 1936, another to Skåne–Smålands Järnväg (SSJ) in 1937. Both returned to SJ in 1940 following nationalization.

== Preservation ==
11 E and 26 E2 have been preserved in Sweden. These include three that have belonged to OKB and both locomotives formerly owned by SSJ and UVHJ. The first of the locomotives, number 900, was de facto transferred to the Swedish Railway Museum already in 1972, although formally included in the strategic reserve; others were sold to the museum or to heritage railways after being removed from the reserve.

E 1090 was sold in 1994 to the Zuid-Limburgse Stoomtrein Maatschappij (ZLSM) in the Netherlands. In 1998 ZLSM also bought E2 1040. E2 909 was initially sold to a Swedish preservation society, but came to Hull–Chelsea–Wakefield Railway in 1992, while the Swedish owner was compensated with another locomotive from the strategic reserve. The purpose of this arrangement was to give the Hull–Chelsea–Wakefield Railway a locomotive that was ready for immediate use, not one that would need to be overhauled after its time in the reserve. E2 1122 is also abroad since 2015, leased to the Krøderen Line. In October 2018 E2 1122 was hauled back to JÅÅJ in Sweden because the leasing contract ran out. As of 2024, E2 909 is in storage following the HCW's closure in 2011.

Some locomotives that had been in storage along the Inland Line were taken over by Inlandsbanan AB (IBAB), the operator on that line, for use in tourist trains. E2 905 and a B class locomotive also owned by IBAB are the only usable steam locomotives owned by a commercial railway operator in Sweden.
