= SJ A =

Class of Swedish steam locomotives

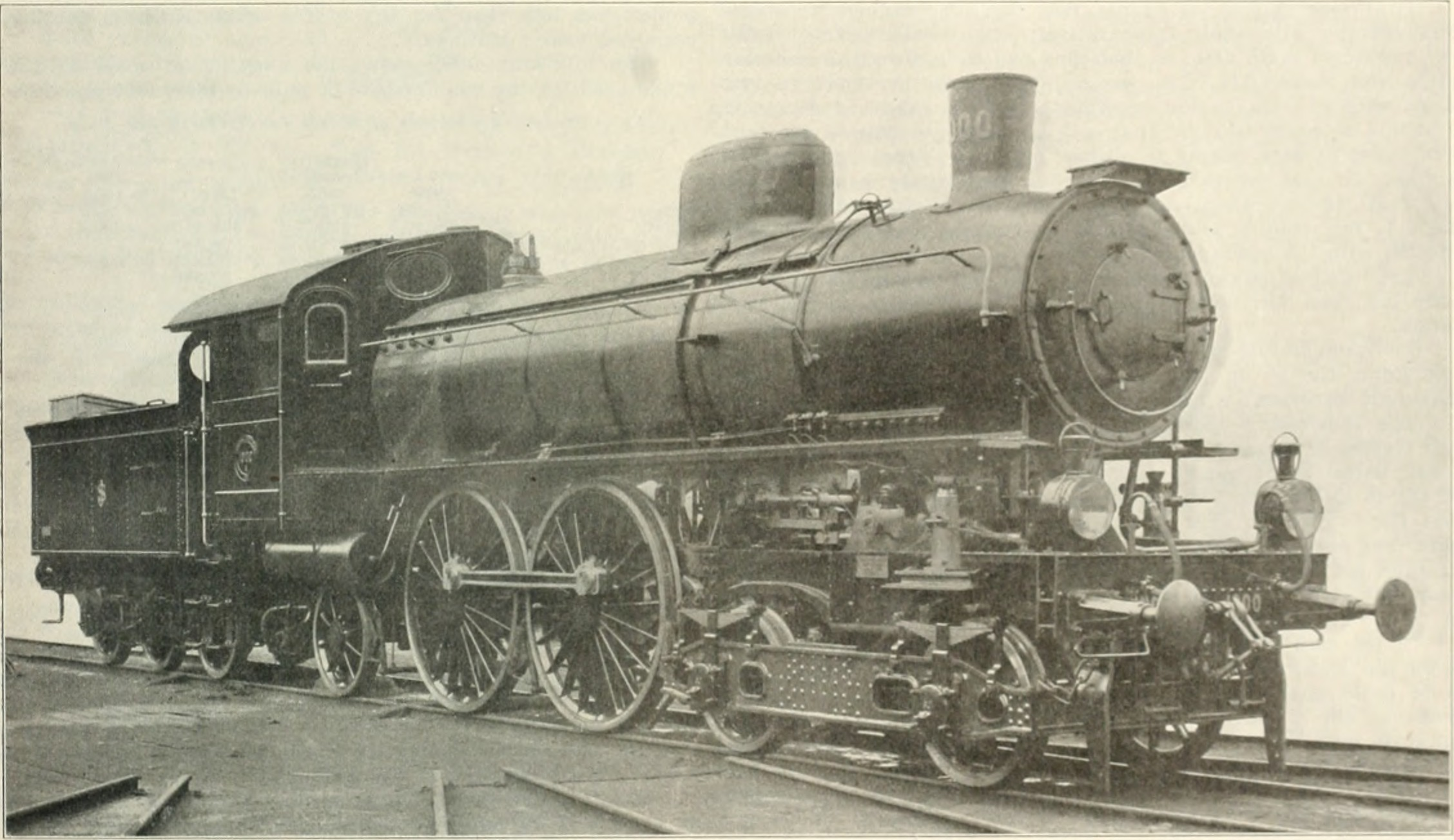
- A 1000 with the original C class tender
Type and origin
- Power type: Steam
- Builder: NOHAB (11); Motala Verkstad (15)
- Build date: 1906–1909
Specifications
- Configuration
  - Whyte: 4-4-2 (Atlantic)
  - UIC: 2'B1' h2
- Gauge: 1,435 mm (4 ft 8 1/2 in) standard gauge
- Leading dia.: 970 mm (3 ft 2 in)
- Driver dia.: 1,880 mm (6 ft 2 in)
- Trailing dia.: 1,098 mm (3 ft 7.2 in)
- Length: 19,525 mm (64 ft 0.7 in)
- Loco weight: 60.2 tonnes (59.2 long tons; 66.4 short tons)
- Total weight: 106.8 tonnes (105.1 long tons; 117.7 short tons)
- Fuel type: Coal
- Fuel capacity: 6.0 tonnes (5.9 long tons; 6.6 short tons)
- Water cap.: 20.0 m^{3} (4,400 imp gal; 5,300 US gal)
- Cylinders: Two
- Cylinder size: 500 mm × 600 mm (20 in × 24 in)
Performance figures
- Maximum speed: 90 km/h (56 mph)
- Tractive effort: 6.2 Mp (61 kN; 14,000 lbf)
Career
- Operators: Statens Järnvägar; Ostkustbanan
- Number in class: 26
- Numbers: 1000–1025
- Disposition: 1 preserved, 25 scrapped
- Data is with A class tender. Reference

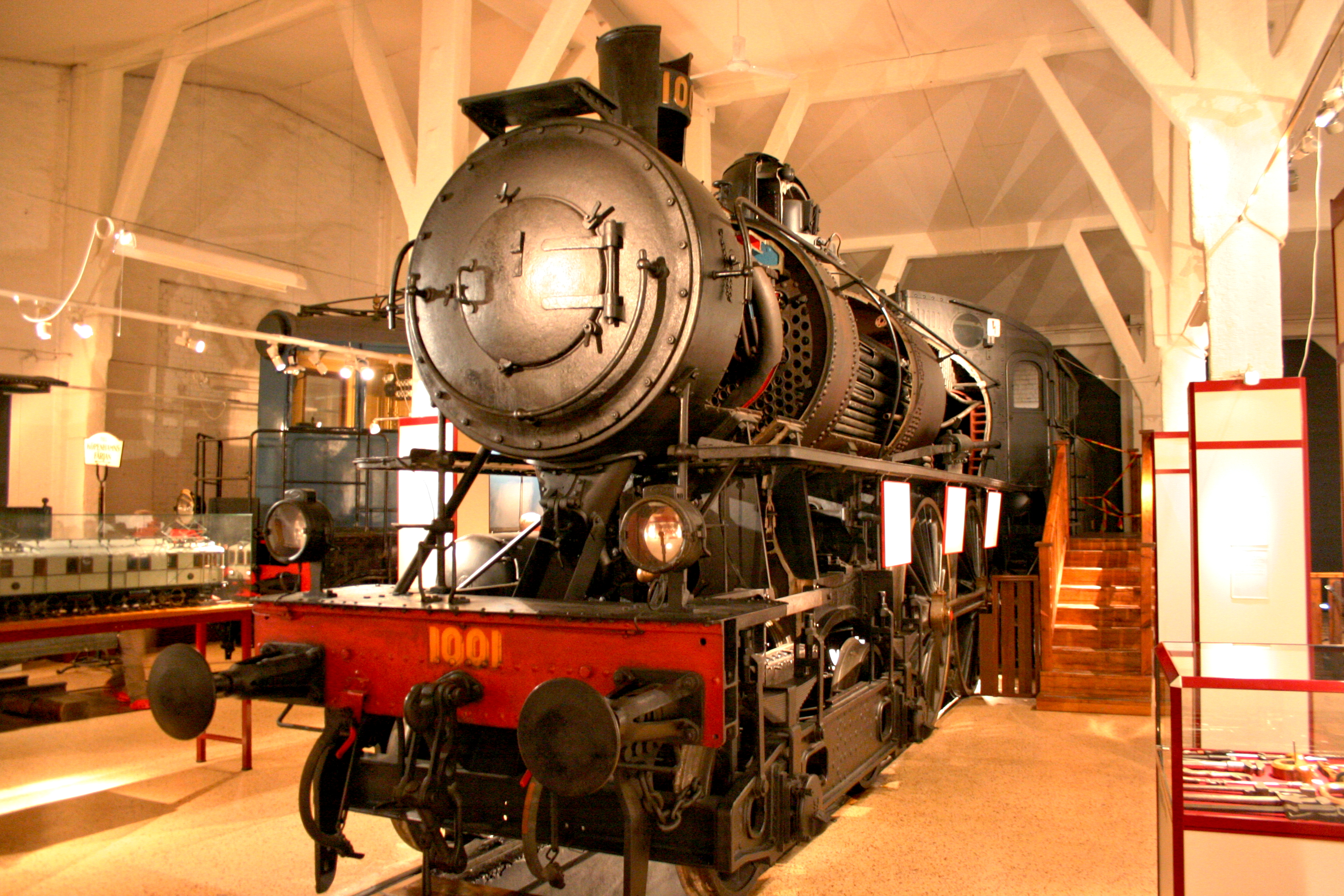
The boiler and some other parts of the preserved locomotive have been cut open to show how a steam locomotive works.

The A class of the Swedish State Railways (SJ) was a type of steam locomotive built between 1906 and 1909 for hauling mainline express trains. The 26 locomotives were built to replace older types that could not cope with the increasingly heavy express trains, but soon became insufficient themselves. They were relegated to less important passenger trains, and five were transferred to then-independent Ostkustbanan (OKB) in the 1920s, but returned when that company was nationalized in 1933.

OKB and SJ had a total of eight locomotives rebuilt, replacing the trailing wheels with an extra pair of driving wheels. The locomotives that had not been rebuilt were scrapped in the late 1930s, except for number 1001 which is preserved at the Swedish Railway Museum, but the rebuilt ones survived until the early 1970s. OKB also built two locomotives of a related design, but with a smaller driving wheel diameter. These were also taken over by SJ and were in regular use until 1961; one has been preserved.

The A class locomotives were the first of SJ with superheaters, and have been described as the first modern steam locomotives in Sweden. Some parts introduced with the A class were to become SJ standard, fitted to several types of locomotives. The tender designed for the A class was also used for the much more numerous B class.

== History ==
The first express train locomotives of SJ were the 2-2-2 A class of 1863, designed by Beyer, Peacock & Company, and the 2-4-0 C (later Ca) class of 1875, designed by Borsig in Berlin. These locomotives were too small when trains became heavier, particularly after bogie carriages were introduced by SJ in 1891, and double heading was often needed. The Ca class was developed into the 4-4-0 Cb and Cc classes, which also quickly became insufficient. SJ started working on a new fast locomotive that was to be capable of hauling seven carriages with an average weight of 30 tonnes (30 long tons; 33 short tons) in 90 kilometres per hour (56 mph) on flat ground and in 50 km/h (31 mph) on long 1 in 100 gradients. The new type was designed from scratch by SJ and built by Swedish companies; 11 locomotives were built by NOHAB and 15 by Motala Verkstad between 1906 and 1909.

The new type became the A class, as there no longer remained any Beyer, Peacock locomotives with that designation. The use of the first letter of the alphabet was probably symbolical, as was the numbering: the first member of the class became number 1000, despite other contemporary locomotives having numbers in the 800s. Most of the gap was filled in later, but number 999 remains vacant.

The A class was a 4-4-2 or Atlantic wheel arrangement with 1,880-millimetre (6 ft 2 in) driving wheels. They differed in many ways from previous types, and have been described as the first modern steam locomotives in Sweden. They were the first superheated locomotives of SJ, being equipped with Schmidt type superheaters. The boiler and running boards were given a rather high placement, above the driving wheels. The class had a bar frame and inside cylinders. They were delivered with six-wheeled C class tenders, but these were replaced with new A class tenders in 1909–1911. Some parts introduced with the A class were to become SJ standard, fitted to several types of locomotives.

At this time, the Swedish railways had a general speed limit of only 90 km/h, but the A class was considerably faster. Number 1000 is said to have reached 137 km/h (85 mph) during trials in 1906, but it was not officially recorded (the official Swedish record for steam locomotives, held by an H3 class locomotive of private company Bergslagernas Järnvägar, is a mere 125.5 km/h (78 mph)). The performance of the A class met the specifications, but once again the newest type of locomotive soon became insufficient. Direct services to Germany began in 1909, and the new carriages built for this traffic weighted 45 tonnes (44 long tons; 50 short tons), as opposed to the 30 tonnes calculated when designing the A class. Wheelslip was a common problem. It was also impossible to lower the journey times further using the A class.

The 4-6-0 B class, introduced in 1909, was also capable of running in 90 km/h on flat ground and 50 km/h on gradients, and was stronger than the A class. Intended for fast freight trains and heavy stopping passenger trains, it was also frequently used in express trains. It was followed in 1914 by the large F class, a 4-6-2 compound locomotive, designed for hauling trains of 360 tonnes (350 long tons; 400 short tons) and used in express trains on the Southern Main Line until electrification. The A class was relegated to less important passenger trains until electrification made them unnecessary in that role too.

Two of the A class locomotives were used for experiments with peat-based fuel between 1926 and 1932, and were once again given C class tenders during this period. Five others were transferred to Ostkustbanan in 1926–1927, and three were rebuilt by SJ to a 4-6-0 wheel arrangement in 1930. Number 1001 was allocated to the Swedish Railway Museum in 1937, and has been on display since 1942 with some parts cut open to show how a steam locomotive works. The remaining 4-4-2 locomotives were scrapped in 1937–1939, most of them in Vislanda.

== Rebuilding ==
=== OKB A ===
OKB A, SJ A2
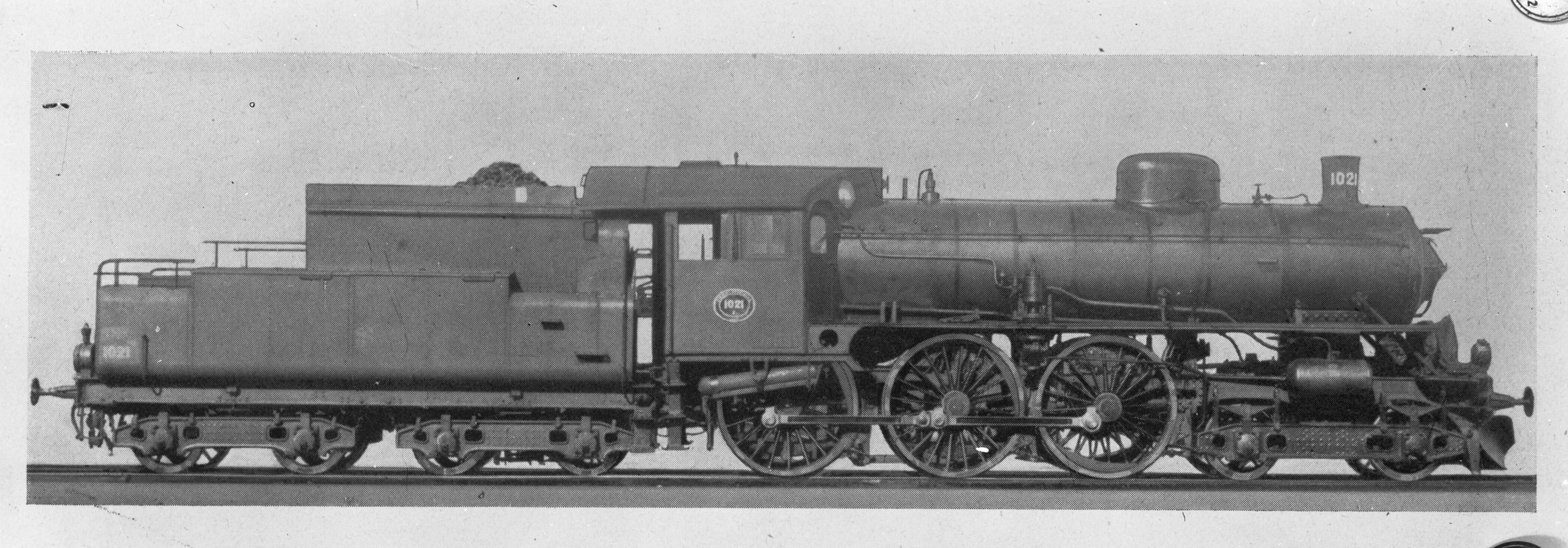
Type and origin
- Power type: Steam
- Rebuild date: 1929, 1930
Specifications
- Configuration
  - Whyte: 4-6-0
  - UIC: 2'C h2
- Loco weight: A: 63.8 tonnes (62.8 long tons; 70.3 short tons); A2: 67.7 tonnes (66.6 long tons; 74.6 short tons)
- Total weight: A: 110.4 tonnes (108.7 long tons; 121.7 short tons); A2: 114.3 tonnes (112.5 long tons; 126.0 short tons)
Career
- Operators: Statens Järnvägar; Ostkustbanan
- Number in class: 8 (both types combined)
- Numbers: 1000, 1004, 1007, 1008, 1012, 1017, 1021, 1022
- Disposition: Scrapped
- Other data remained unchanged. Data is with A class tender. Reference

The railway between Gävle and Härnösand was built by the private company Ostkustbanan (OKB), the first section opening in 1923. The company was troubled financially from its inception, and depended on loans from the state; it was controlled by the Swedish government from 1924. As part of the state aid, five A class and twelve E class locomotives were transferred from SJ to OKB before the start of large-scale traffic in 1927, retaining their old class designations.

OKB also found the performance of the A class unsatisfactory, and had them rebuilt at Motala Verkstand in 1929 to a 4-6-0 wheel arrangement. OKB was nationalized in 1933, and the locomotives were returned to SJ where they regained their old numbers but were given the new A3 class designation. Two A2 class locomotives were rebuilt to the A3 class in 1939 and 1940. Most of the locomotives were again given C class tenders for some time, and several were modified for wood-firing during World War II and equipped with smoke deflectors of the Wagner type. They became the A class once again when many locomotive types were given new designations in 1942, and remained on the East Coast Line until electrification, when they were placed in the strategic reserve.

The strategic reserve was made up of surplus steam locomotives, preserved in usable condition to replace diesel-powered vehicles if the import of oil was interrupted. In the 1960s, some trial runs were done with locomotives from the strategic reserve, including the A class, and the outcome of these trials was that SJ decided to remove all steam locomotives except the B, E, E2 and E10 classes from the reserve. Number 1008 was the last member of the A class in use when it did a trial run in 1968. All the rebuilt A class locomotives were scrapped between 1969 and 1972.

=== SJ A2 ===
SJ also wanted to improve the performance of their A class locomotives, and three were rebuilt in 1930, creating the 4-6-0 A2 class. Unlike the OKB locomotives, the A2 class also received new boilers of the standard BGb type, first introduced with the B class. Two of the A2 class locomotives were rebuilt to the A3 class in 1939 and 1940, with boilers of the original A class type, as the BGb type boilers were needed elsewhere. The sole remaining A2 locomotive was used together with the A3 class until scrapped in 1970.

== Related development ==
=== OKB H ===
OKB H
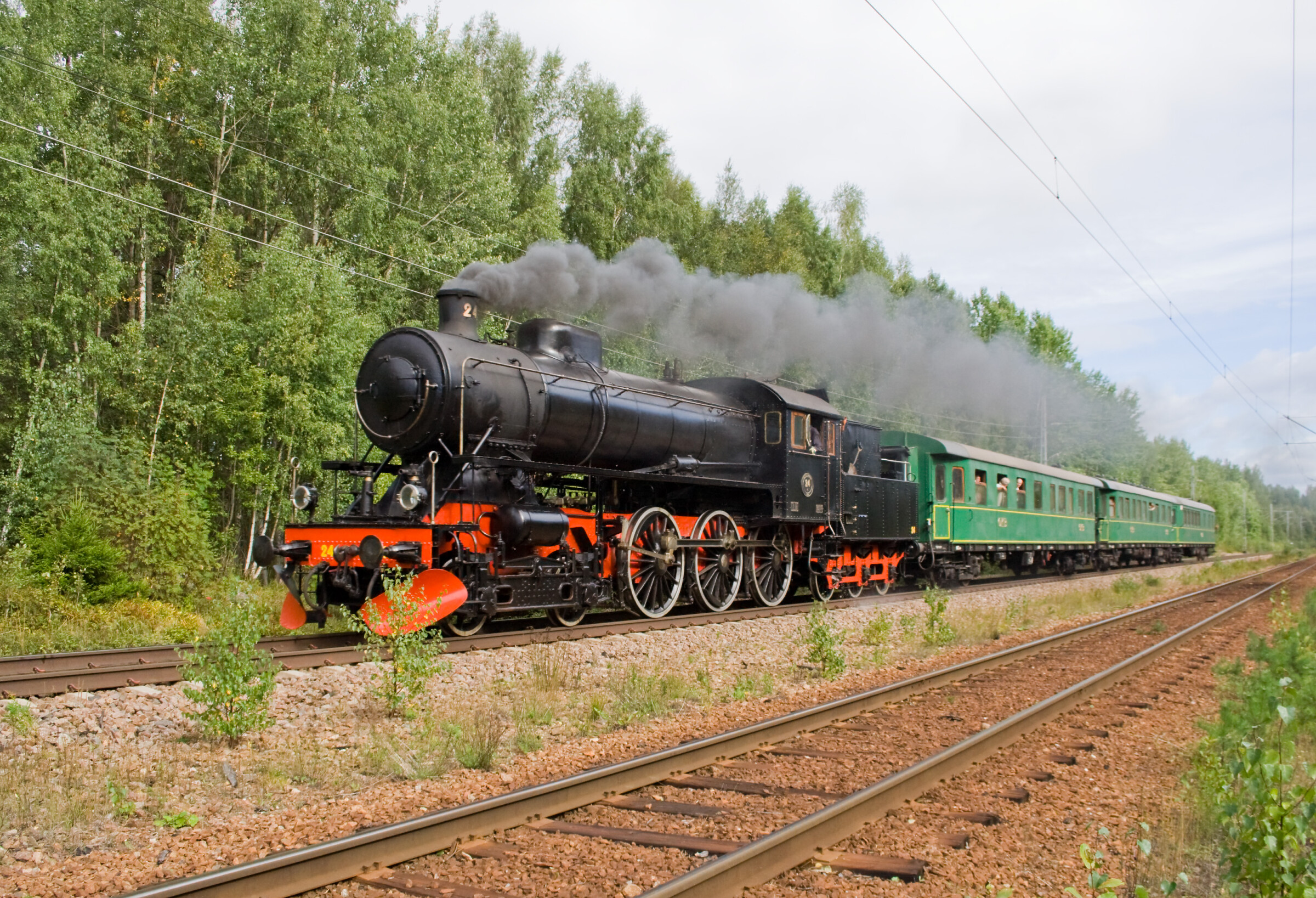
Type and origin
- Power type: Steam
- Builder: Motala Verkstad
- Build date: 1928
Specifications
- Configuration
  - Whyte: 4-6-0
  - UIC: 2'C h2
- Gauge: 1,435 mm (4 ft 8 1/2 in) standard gauge
- Leading dia.: 970 mm (3 ft 2 in)
- Driver dia.: 1,720 mm (5 ft 8 in)
- Length: 17,700 mm (58 ft 1 in)
- Loco weight: 63.5 tonnes (62.5 long tons; 70.0 short tons)
- Total weight: 97.5 tonnes (96.0 long tons; 107.5 short tons)
- Fuel type: Coal
- Fuel capacity: 6.0 tonnes (5.9 long tons; 6.6 short tons)
- Water cap.: 14.0 m^{3} (3,100 imp gal; 3,700 US gal)
- Cylinders: Two
- Cylinder size: 520 mm × 610 mm (20 in × 24 in)
Performance figures
- Maximum speed: 90 km/h (56 mph)
Career
- Operators: Statens Järnvägar; Ostkustbanan
- Number in class: 2
- Numbers: OKB: 24, 25; SJ: 1509, 1510
- Disposition: 1 preserved, 1 scrapped
- Data is with original tender. Reference

The A class locomotives acquired by OKB were not only unsatisfactory, but also too few, and passenger trains sometimes had to be hauled by the slower E class. In 1928 the railway bought two H class locomotives from Motala Verkstad. They were a compromise between the H3 class, popular with Swedish private railways, and the A class, having the six 1,720 mm (5 ft 8 in) driving wheels of the H3 class, but many other components that were identical to the A class, including the boiler and leading bogie. The boiler was placed unusually high on the frame, to the extent that the locomotives were too high to be used on some railway lines. After nationalization they became the OKa class of SJ. The first two letters indicated that the type had been inherited from OKB, but this unpractical system was abandoned in 1942. The OKa class then became the A3 class, the previous A3 class having been renamed A.

The original tenders of the H class were six-wheeled; they were similar to the SJ L class tender, but after nationalization they were designated first OKa and later A3 like the locomotives they belonged to. Most SJ tenders were given new designations in 1947, and the A3 class tender became the C2 class, together with various other tenders inherited from private railways. The A3 locomotives had standard A class tenders during two periods in the 1940s, but the original tenders were returned to them both times.

After nationalization the locomotives initially remained on the East Coast Line, but they were also used between Gävle and Ånge. They were later used on a number of lines: the Bohus Line in the early 1940s, in Bergslagen from 1945, between Nässjö and Kalmar in the early 1950s, and finally in Dalarna between 1956 and 1961. At some point they were given smoke deflectors of the Witte type. They were eventually placed in the strategic reserve, and one has been preserved by a society in Sundsvall, while the other was scrapped in 1975.

=== A class tender ===
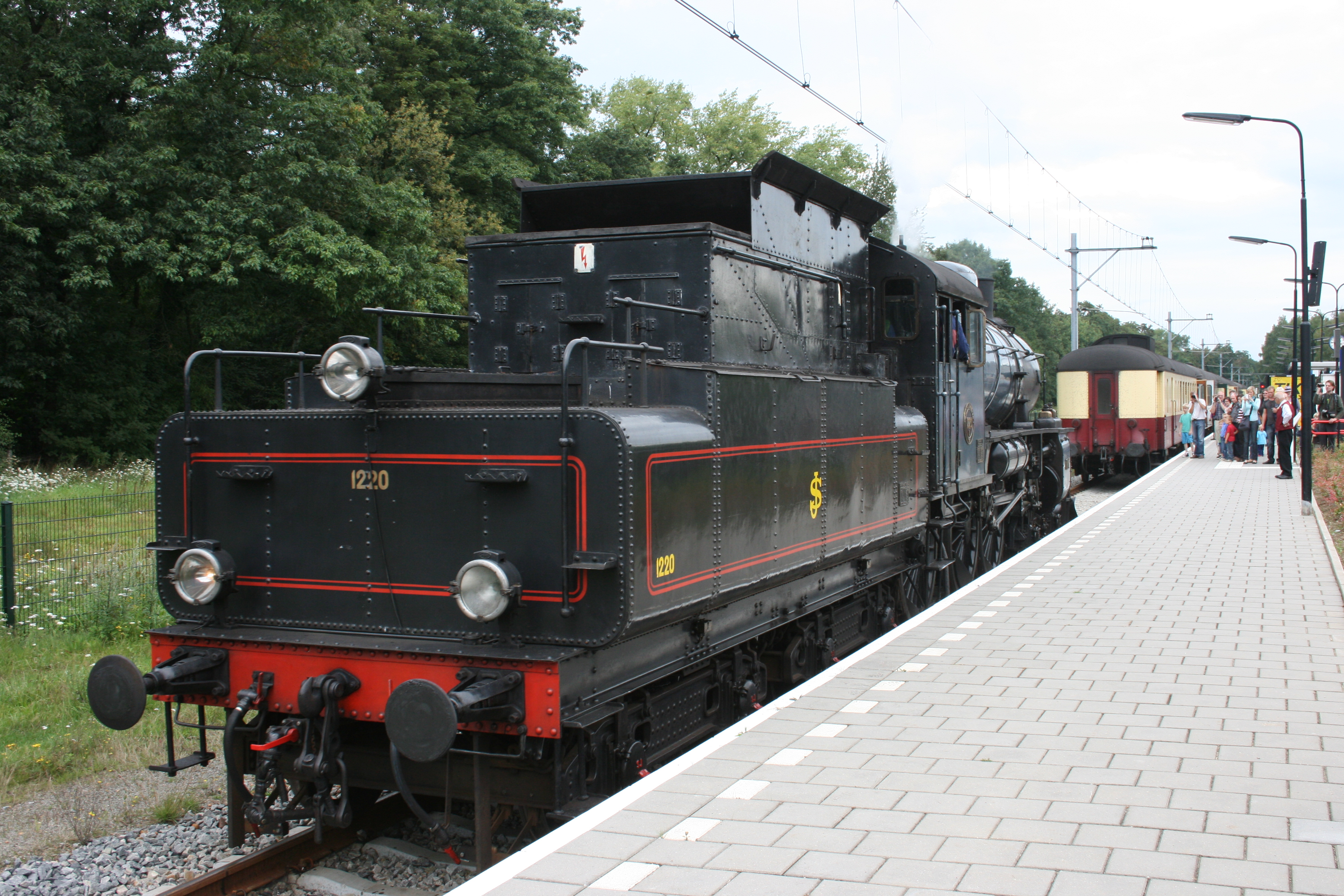
The A class tender was also used with B class locomotives. This image of preserved B 1220 shows the shape of the Gölsdorf type tender.

The A class locomotives were delivered with six-wheeled C class tenders, but new A class tenders were delivered between 1909 and 1911. It was a bogie tender of the Gölsdorf model, derived from the R class tender, which was based on a tender type of the Austrian railways. The tender had an empty weight of 20.6 metric tons (20.3 long tons; 22.7 short tons), and could carry 6.0 tonnes (5.9 long tons; 6.6 short tons) of coal and 20.0 cubic metres (4,400 imp gal; 5,300 US gal) of water. It became something of a standard type: all the 96 B class locomotives built for SJ were given A class tenders, and later also some locomotives of the C, E, E2, G6 and L classes.
