= HNJ Mb =

Class of Swedish steam locomotives

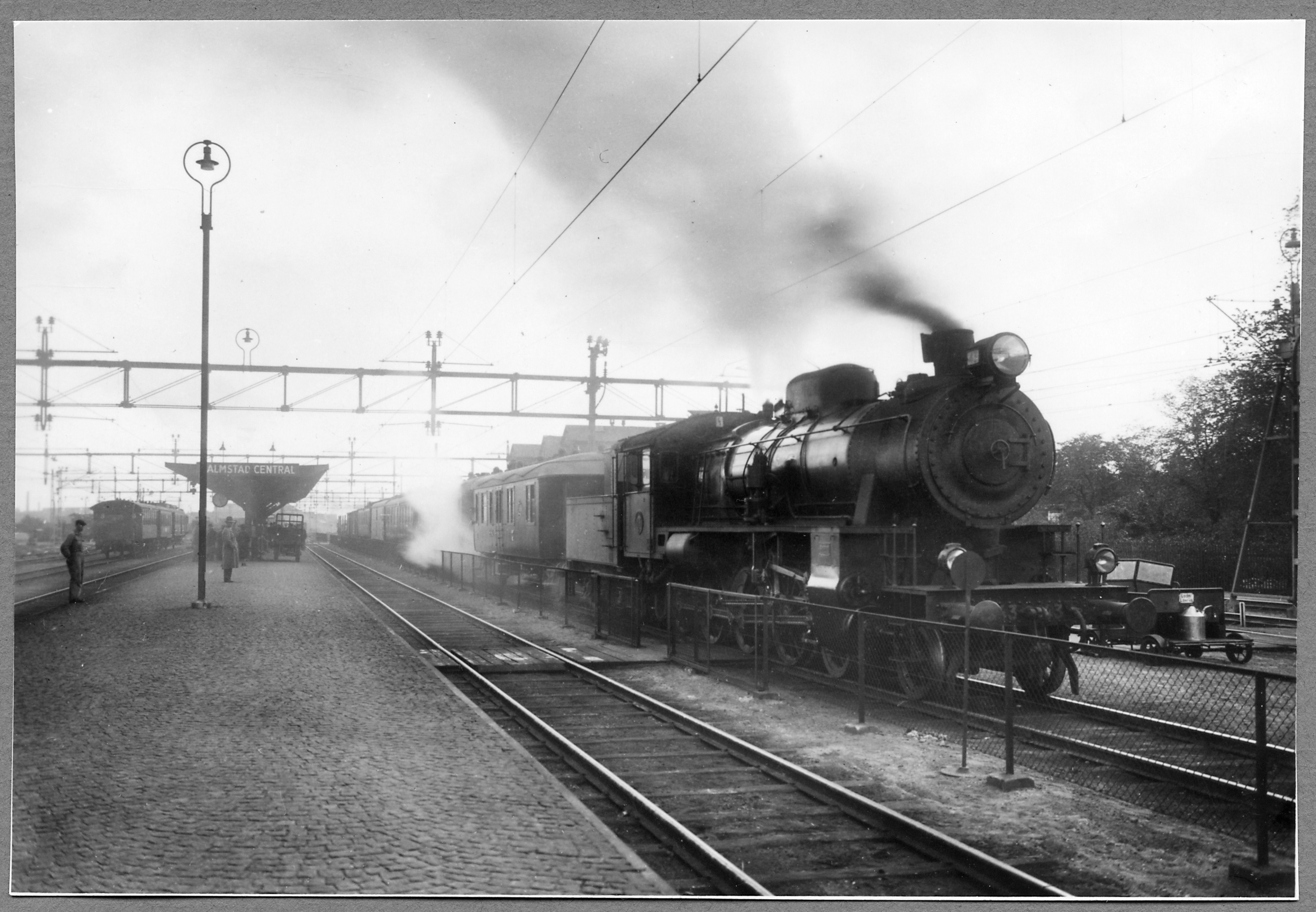
- G12 no:43 leaving Halmstad Station in 1931
Type and origin
- Power type: Steam
- Builder: NOHAB
- Build date: 1931–1936
Specifications
- Configuration
  - Whyte: 4-8-0
  - UIC: 2′D h3
- Gauge: 1,435 mm (4 ft 8 1/2 in) standard gauge
- Leading dia.: 900 mm (2 ft 11 in)
- Driver dia.: 1,400 mm (4 ft 7 in)
- Length: 18,000 mm (59 ft 1 in)
- Loco weight: 73.5 tonnes (72.3 long tons; 81.0 short tons)
- Total weight: 111.5 tonnes (109.7 long tons; 122.9 short tons)
- Fuel type: Coal
- Fuel capacity: 5.0 tonnes (4.9 long tons; 5.5 short tons)
- Water cap.: 15.0 m^{3} (3,300 imp gal; 4,000 US gal)
- Cylinders: Three
Performance figures
- Maximum speed: 70 km/h (43 mph)
- Tractive effort: 12.1 Mp (119 kN; 27,000 lbf)
Career
- Operators: Halmstad–Nässjö Järnväg; Statens Järnvägar
- Number in class: 6
- Disposition: Scrapped

The Mb, later G12 class of Halmstad–Nässjö Järnväg (HNJ), known after nationalization in 1945 as the E9 class of the Swedish State Railways (SJ), was a type of steam locomotive built primarily for freight traffic. They were the basis for the nearly identical SJ E10 class.

== History ==
Three Mb class three-cylinder 4-8-0 locomotives were built by NOHAB for HNJ in 1931, based on an older type, the 2-8-0 M class built in Germany in 1922. HNJ changed their type designations the year after, and the Mb class became the G12 class, where G meant that they were intended for freight trains (Swedish: godståg). Three more G12 class locomotives were built in 1936.

Despite their designation the locomotives were also used in passenger trains. They remained on the HNJ network after nationalization in 1945, but were also used on the line between Alvesta and Borås. SJ referred to the type as the E9 class. They were in service until 1959, and were then placed in reserve. They were scrapped between 1974 and 1976, and none have been preserved.

In the 1940s the Swedish State Railways (SJ) saw a need for modern steam locomotives for freight traffic on the Inland Line and in southern Norrland. NOHAB built ten E10 class locomotives in 1947 from the same blueprints, but with some modifications. The E10 class locomotives were in use until the 1960s.
