= SJ R =

Class of 5 Swedish 0-10-0 locomotives

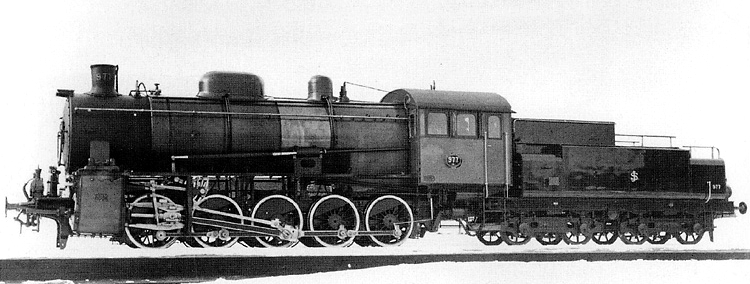
- R 977 on the day of delivery in 1909
Type and origin
- Power type: Steam
- Build date: 1908–1909
Specifications
- Configuration
  - Whyte: 0-10-0
- Gauge: 1,435 mm (4 ft 8 1/2 in) standard gauge
- Driver dia.: 1,300 mm (4 ft 3 in)
- Length: 19,850 mm (65 ft 1 in)
- Loco weight: 84.8 tonnes (83.5 long tons; 93.5 short tons)
- Total weight: 130.0 tonnes (127.9 long tons; 143.3 short tons)
- Fuel type: Coal
Performance figures
- Maximum speed: 50 km/h (31 mph)
Career
- Operators: Statens Järnvägar; Gävle–Dala Järnväg
- Number in class: 5
- Numbers: 974–978

The R class of the Swedish State Railways (SJ) was a type of steam locomotive built between 1908 and 1909. The class was built primarily to pull heavy iron ore trains on the Iron Ore Line in northern Sweden.

== History ==
As the iron ore trains became heavier in the early 1900s, it became obvious to the Swedish State Railways that their M class of locomotives could not pull the heavier trains without the help of a pusher engine. SJ then placed an order of five locomotives with a 0-10-0 configuration. The class was at its introduction in 1908 the most powerful steam locomotive built in Sweden, a record which lasted until 1930 when the M3t class was introduced.

In 1914 the electrification of the Iron Ore Line had begun, thus making the R class unnecessary at the Iron Ore line, and the locomotives were transferred south to be used in regular freight trains. In 1935 two locomotives were sold to the private railway Gävle-Dala Järnväg. In 1963 one locomotive (R 975) was sent to Denmark as a part of a deal to bring the F1200 locomotive of the F class. R975 was subsequently scrapped in Denmark in 1963. Of the remaining four locomotives in Sweden, three were scrapped in 1973. The last locomotive was preserved and is kept in running order by the Swedish Railway Museum, which uses the locomotive in heritage trains on special occasions.

== Sources ==
- Karlsson, Lars Olov (2008). SJ:s Ånglok. Franks Stenvalls förlag. ISBN 978-91-7266-171-4.
- Mer om R-loken på Svenska-lok.se
