= Zuid-Limburgse Stoomtrein Maatschappij =

Coordinates: 50°49′54″N 5°58′41″E

Valkenburg–Kerkrade Miljoenenlijn
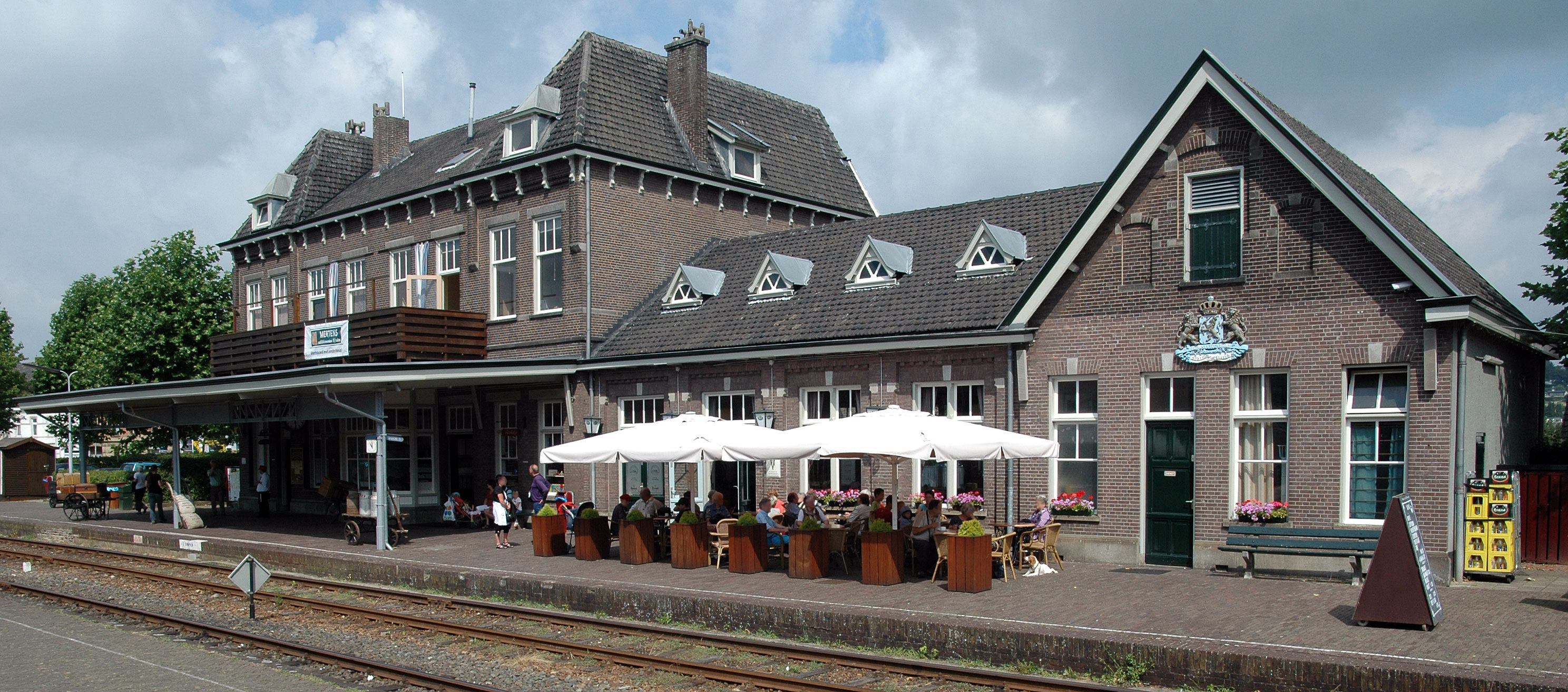
- Main railway station at Simpelveld

Technical
- Track length: 29 km (18 mi)
- Track gauge: 1,435 mm (4 ft 8 1/2 in) standard gauge
South Limburg Steam Train Company
Map of the railway
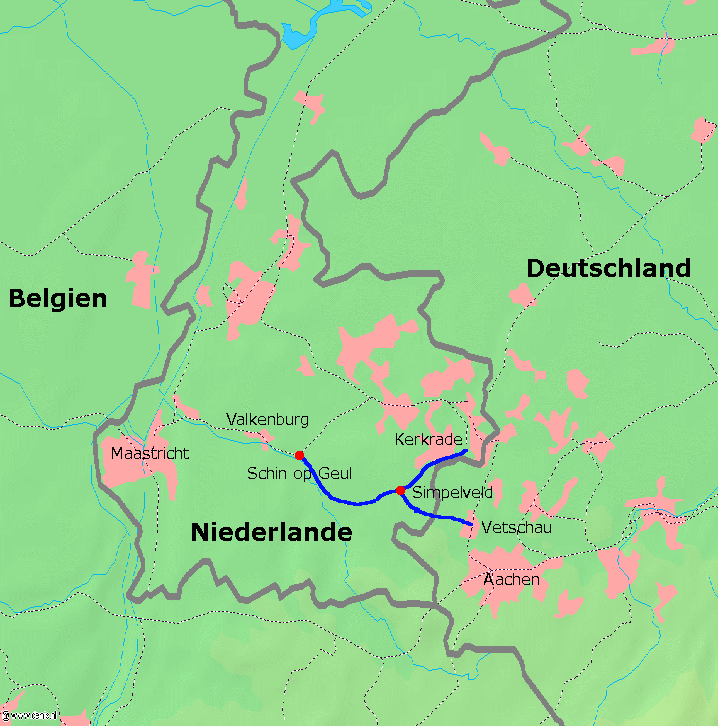

The Zuid-Limburgse Stoomtrein Maatschappij (South Limburg Steam Train Company) or ZLSM is a heritage railway operating from its main station of Simpelveld to Schin op Geul and Kerkrade in the south of the Netherlands. It also runs across the border from Simpelveld to Aachen-Vetschau and has an extensive collection of stock. The ZLSM is currently partnered with the Great Central Railway in England, as they have both double-track railways, although one is disused.

== Rolling stock ==
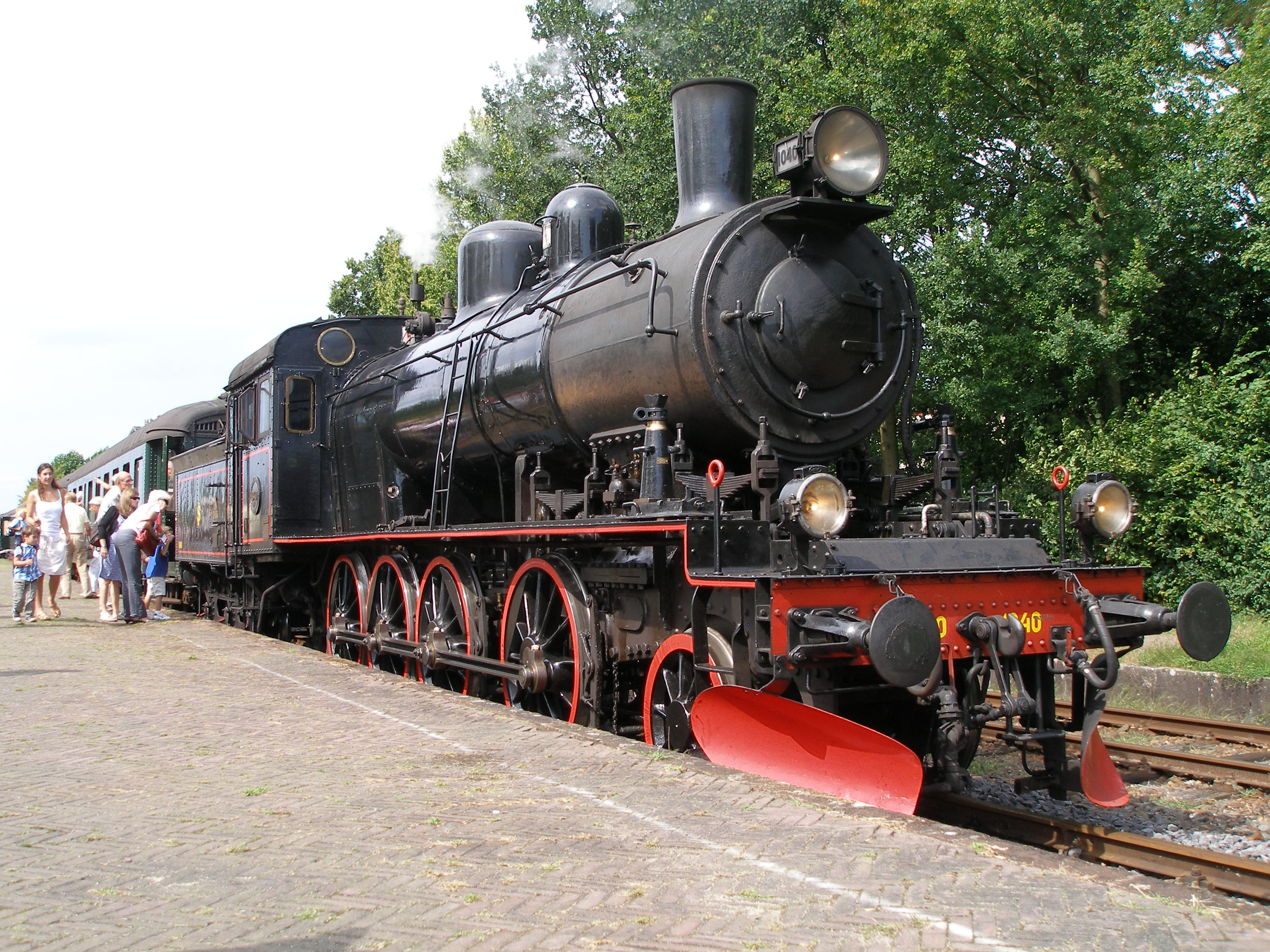
Steam locomotive SJ E2 1040 (1910) of the ZLSM

=== Steam Locos ===
- SJ E2 1040 (1910)
- SJ E 1090 (1911)
- SJ B 1220 (1914)
- SJ B 1289 (1916). Lease-lend from Spoorwegmuseum
- NS 8826 (1944)
- DRB 52 532 (1943). Lease-lend from private owner
- Krauss "RWTH IFS 3 (Anna)" (1921).

=== Diesel Locos ===
- NS 248 "Sik" (1935)
- Köf II "Lommaert" (1954)
- KS 55 B "Laura" (1954). Lease-lent to a mining museum in Kerkrade
- NS 639 "Hippel" (1957)
- NS 677 "Hippel" (1955)
- Esslingen Neuhof Q "EH 244" (1961)
- DB Class Köf III "Spaniol" (1964)
- DB Class Köf III "Conrad" (1964)
- Deutz V6M536r "SM 130" (1958). Lease-lend from private trust
- LKM N4b (1956). Lease-lend from private owner

=== Train units ===
- DMU NS 179 "Blauwe Engel" (1952)
- DMU Railbus VT 798-04 (1956)
- DMU Railbus VT 798-09 (1959)

=== Trams ===
- LTM 610 (1931).

=== Passenger cars ===
- CIWL Pullman 2nd class 4129 (1927)
- CIWL WR 4268 (1955)
- NMBS/SNCB K1A 21010 (1934)
- NMBS/SNCB K1A 21016 (1934)
- NMBS/SNCB K1A 21020 (1934)
- NMBS/SNCB K1A 21024 (1934)
- NMBS/SNCB K1A 21028 (1934)
- NMBS/SNCB K1A 21031 (1934)
- NMBS/SNCB K1A 21035 (1934)
- NMBS/SNCB K1A 21040 (1934)
- NMBS/SNCB K1AD 28106 (1934)
- NMBS/SNCB K1BD 29127 (1934)
- NMBS/SNCB PWD 77015 (1934)
- NMBS/SNCB K3B 22418 (1955)
- NMBS/SNCB K3B 22438 (1955)
- NMBS/SNCB K3B 22476 (1955)
- NS Blokkendoos mC 9029 (1925)
- NS Plan-E BKD 6904 (1955)
