= SJ E10 =

Class of Swedish steam locomotives

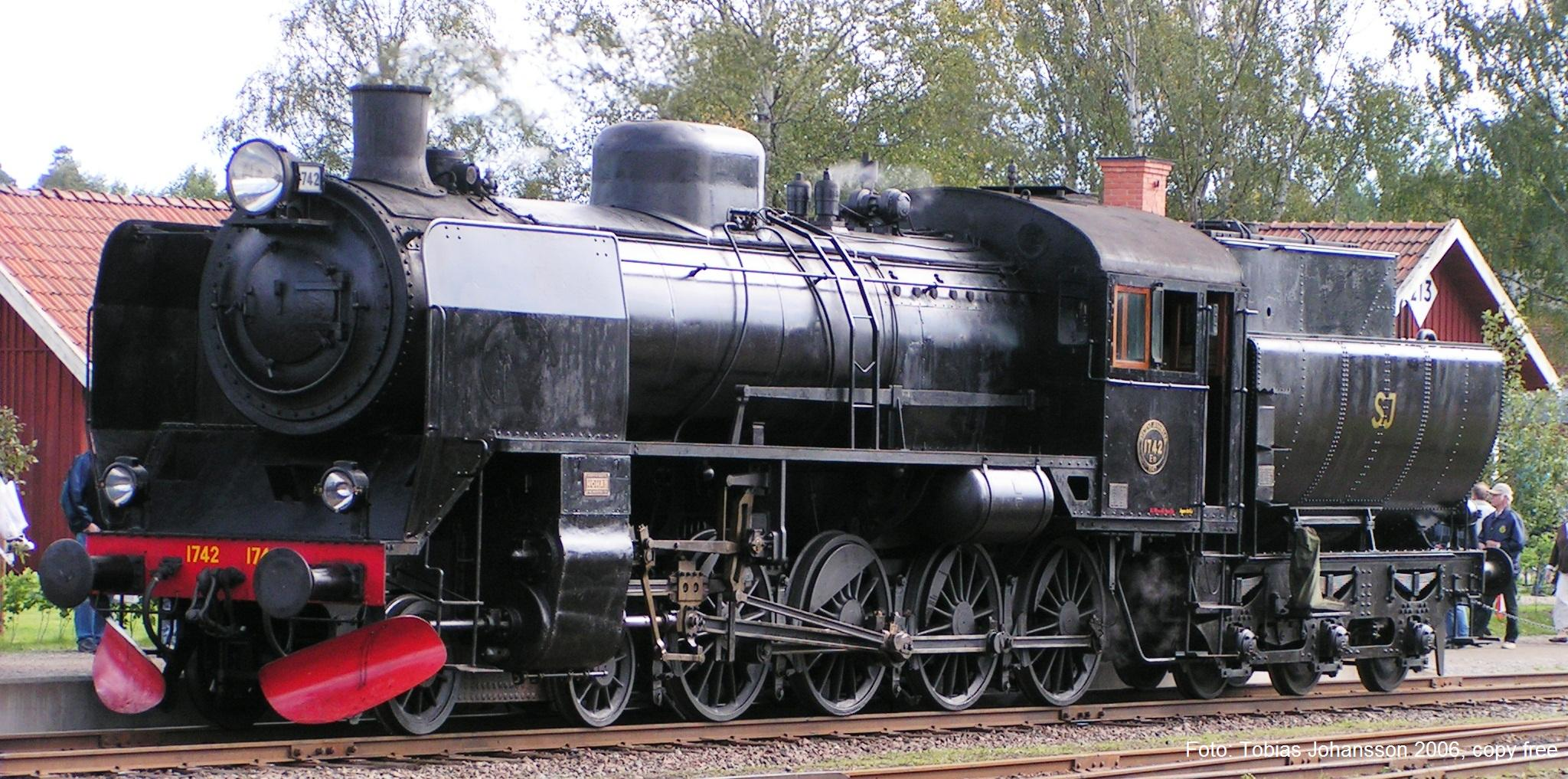
- SJ E10 1742 at the Swedish Railway Museum in Gävle, 2006
Type and origin
- Power type: Steam
- Builder: NOHAB
- Serial number: 2156-2165
- Build date: 1947
Specifications
- Configuration
  - Whyte: 4-8-0
  - UIC: 2′D h3
- Gauge: 1,435 mm (4 ft 8 1/2 in) standard gauge
- Leading dia.: 900 mm (2 ft 11 in)
- Driver dia.: 1,400 mm (4 ft 7 in)
- Length: 18,085 mm (59 ft 4 in)
- Loco weight: 74.2 tonnes (73.0 long tons; 81.8 short tons)
- Total weight: 116.2 tonnes (114.4 long tons; 128.1 short tons)
- Cylinders: Three
Performance figures
- Maximum speed: 70 km/h (43 mph)
Career
- Operators: Statens Järnvägar
- Number in class: 10
- Numbers: 1739–1748
- Disposition: Retired

The Swedish State Railways class E10 was a type of steam locomotive which was used for freight traffic. Ten locomotives were built in 1947 as a slightly modified version of the older E9 class. They were used mainly on the Inland Line, before being placed in the strategic reserve, where some remained until 1990; five of them have been preserved.

== History ==
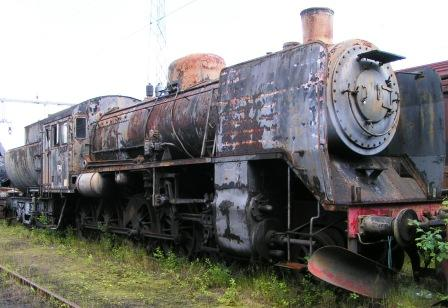
E10 1744 parked in disrepair at Grängesberg in 2004. This locomotive previously belonged to the strategic reserve. It was scrapped in 2012.

In the 1940s the Swedish State Railways (SJ) saw a need for modern steam locomotives for freight traffic on the Inland Line and in southern Norrland. When the private railway company Halmstad–Nässjö Järnväg (HNJ) was nationalized in 1945, their G12 class three-cylinder 4-8-0 locomotives became the E9 class of SJ. Impressed by these smooth-running locomotives with high traction and a low axle load, SJ ordered ten E10 locomotives from NOHAB, based on the E9.

The E10 locomotives, delivered in 1947, were the last large steam locomotives built for the Swedish railways. The class differed from the E9 by having roller bearings, fully enclosed cabs, and slightly different fireboxes. They were given tenders of the G5 type, a six-wheeled semi-Vanderbilt tender originally designed for the Gb class locomotives in 1920, and large smoke deflectors of the German Wagner type.

The type was mainly used on the Mora–Östersund section of the Inland Line and other railways in the Dalarna region. They were converted to oil firing in the 1950s, but this was not very successful, and some locomotives were damaged in fires related to it.

As the use of steam locomotives declined in Sweden, a large number of surplus locomotives were preserved in the strategic reserve (Swedish: Beredskapslok) to replace diesel-powered vehicles in case the import of oil was interrupted. The E10 class was allocated to the strategic reserve in the 1960s. It was one of only four types of steam locomotives to remain in the reserve past the 1970s, (Note: SJ decided to remove all steam locomotives except the B, E, E2 and E10 classes from the strategic reserve in the 1970s, and most were scrapped. The E9 locomotives were all scrapped during this period.) but four of the machines were withdrawn in 1973 and scrapped thereafter. The other six were part of the strategic reserve until 1990, and were later transferred to the Swedish Railway Museum and various preservation societies, although no. 1744 was used for spare parts and eventually scrapped in 2012.

== Locomotive List ==
Number	(Last known) Location / Owner	Current status	Image	Notes
1739	Falun	Unknown		
1740	Kalmar	Scrapped		
1741		Unknown		
1742	Stockholms Kultursällskap för Ånga och Järnväg, Krylbo	Stored		
1743		Unknown		
1744	Järnvägsmuseum, Gävle	Scrapped (2012)		
1745	Järnvägsmuseum, Gävle	Stored		
1746	Järnvägsmuseum, Gävle	Operational		
1747	Stockholms Ånglokssällskap, Stockholm	Operational		
1748	Bergslagernas Järnvägssällskap	Stored		
