= Kåbdalis =

Coordinates: 66°09′N 19°59′E

Kåbdalis (Swedish pronunciation: [ˈkɔ̌bːdalɪs]) is a small locality in Jokkmokk Municipality, Norrbotten County, Sweden, with 91 inhabitants 2005. In the winter many tourists come to the village because of its well-known ski slope.
