= Bergslagernas Järnvägar =

Private railroad company of Sweden

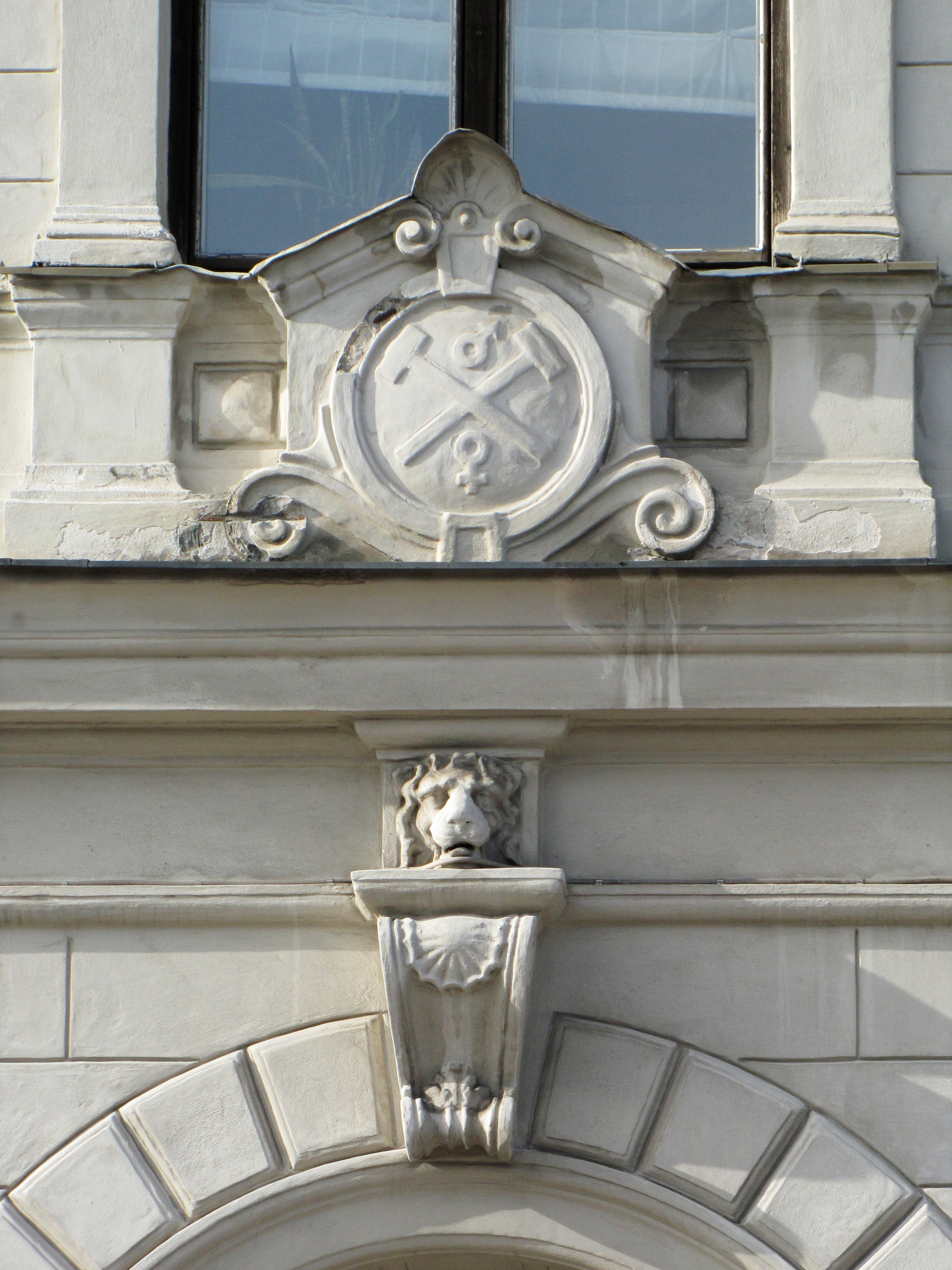
Former railway station building for "Bergslagsbanan": The symbol right above the main entrance. It symbolizes ironwork and was the trademark of the railway company. Later, the trademark also had a train wheel with wings under the ironwork symbol, but that was probably added when the public railway authority took over the business. This image probably may well show the original trademark.

Bergslagernas Järnvägar (BJ) was the largest private railway company of Sweden with a main line from Gothenburg to Falun, in all 478 km. Founded on 26 January 1872, BJ was a transportation system from Bergslagen, the ore-rich areas in southern Sweden, to the port in Gothenburg. It was nationalized and merged into Swedish State Railways in 1948.
