= Inland Line =

Railway line between Kristinehamn and Gällivare in Sweden

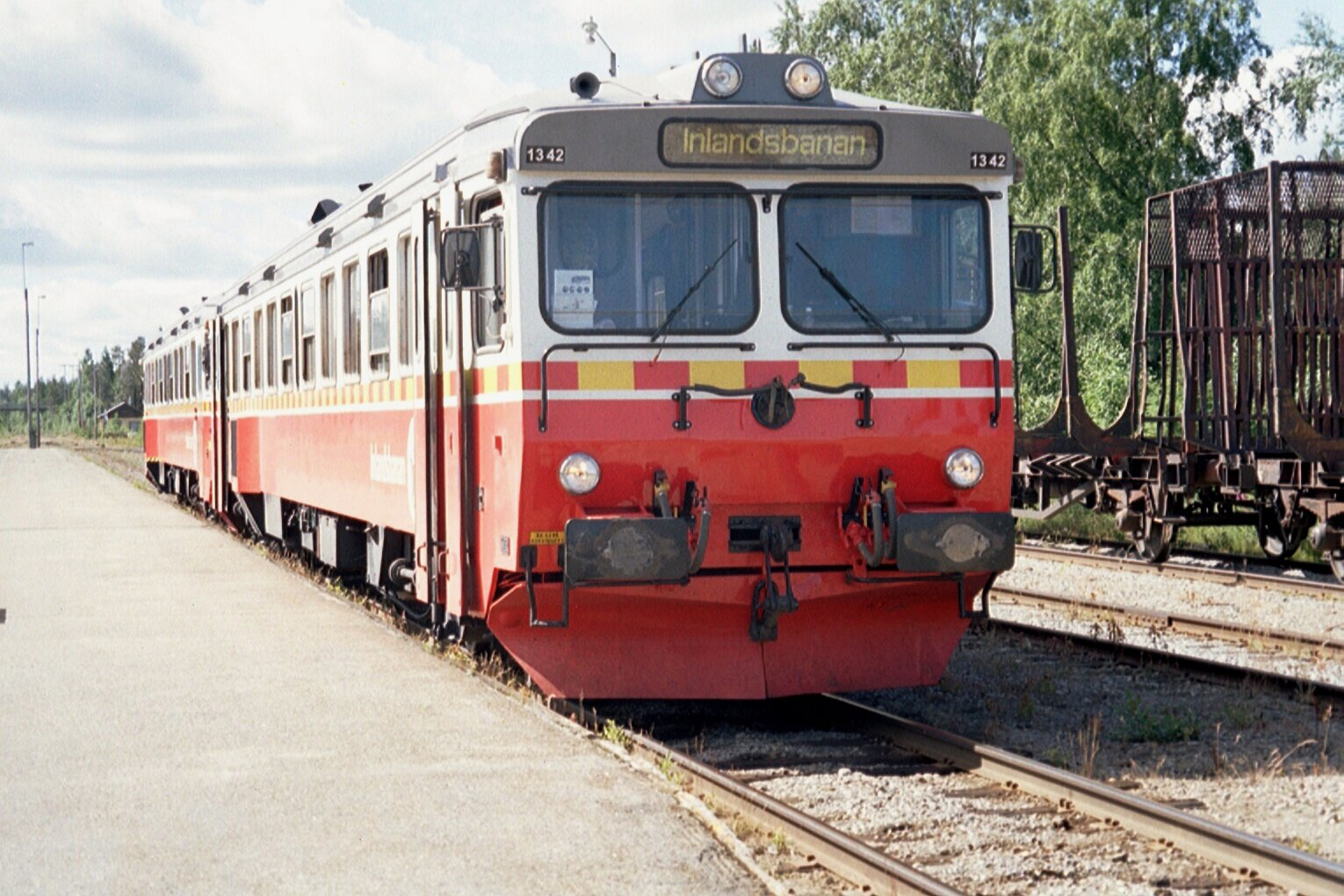
- An Inlandsbanan train

Overview
- Owner: Sweden (State), operator: Inlandsbanan AB
- Termini: Kristinehamn; Gällivare

Service
- Type: Railway
- System: Swedish railway network

History
- Opened: 1908; 6 August 1937 (inaugurated)

Technical
- Line length: 1,288 km (800 mi)
- Num of tracks: 1
- Track gauge: 1,435 mm (4 ft 8 1/2 in)
- Electrification: No (only Kristinehamn–Nykroppa)
Inlandsbanan (The Inland Line)
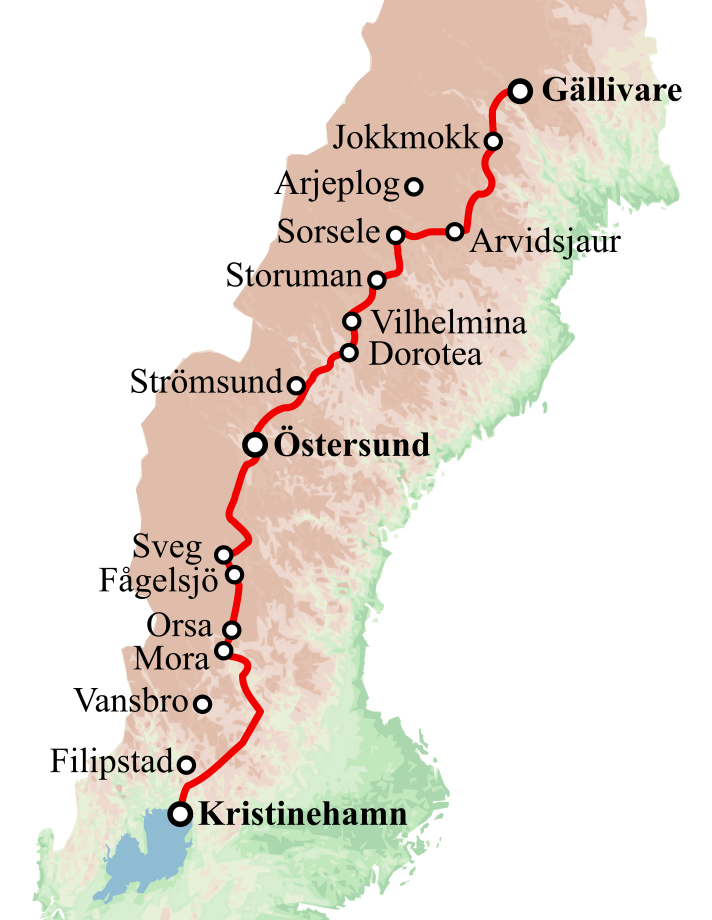

The Inland Line (Swedish: Inlandsbanan) is a 1,288-kilometre (800 mi) railway line between Kristinehamn and Gällivare in Sweden. It runs through the central parts of northern Sweden, and was built between 1908 and 1937.

== History ==
There were several reasons for constructing the railway. The original main line to the north of Sweden ran relatively near the east coast, but inland connections were poor to non-existent; the inland regions, rich in natural resources (mainly timber) needed opening up. However, there was a strategic aspect to be considered; should Sweden be invaded from the east (which at the time was a serious possibility) the belligerents would certainly try to cut the main line to the north as quickly as possible; thus a second reserve route further inland was deemed highly important.

In 1907 the Riksdag decided that the first link between Östersund and Ulriksfors near Strömsund was to be built. The next stage Ulriksfors–Volgsjö (today Vilhelmina) was conceived in 1911; the year after that the Sveg-Brunflo stage was given the go ahead. The northernmost stage Vilhelmina–Gällivare was given the go-ahead in 1917. Finally, by purchasing the private railway lines between Sveg and Kristinehamn the entire 1288 km stretch was complete. These private railways were opened in 1858 (1850 horse-drawn) for Kristinehamn–Sjöändan, 1876 for Sjöändan–Persberg, 1891 for Persberg–Mora, 1892 for Mora–Orsa and 1909 for Orsa–Sveg.

It was to take many years for the navvies to build this line. Originally it was to be inaugurated in 1924, but due to the effects of WW1 and the post-war recession and labour shortages, it was not finished until 1937, opening on 6 August that year.

The line was thereafter operated by SJ, but never proved profitable, suffering gradually decreasing service until 1992, when it was mothballed entirely. By this time the far southern section from Mora to Filipstad had already been closed.

The remaining track was subsequently sold off to the municipalities along the route. Today Inlandsbanan AB operates a passenger service for about 3 months each summer and 4 months in winter as for 2022, primarily for tourists. For 2022 the service consists of one train daily on each section (Östersund-Mora-Östersund and Östersund-Gällivare-Östersund) The Östersund–Gällivare section, a journey of around 14 hours; likewise a single train pair makes the round trip Östersund–Mora–Östersund, taking about 6 hours each way. The line has also been re-opened to freight and sees a considerable amount of traffic, mainly logging traffic. Also for 2013 the line between Kristinehamn and Mora has been refurbished and is once again open throughout, served by one train pair per day for the peak period (for exact times check Inlandbanan's web site); otherwise a coach service is provided along the route. The southernmost 40 km (25 mi), Kristinehamn–Nykroppa, also has a sparse all-seasons passenger service operated by Värmlandstrafik as part of a line from Kristinehamn to Ludvika.

The Inlandsbanan railway is currently an underutilised infrastructure facility in the Swedish transport system, whose importance and role have increased significantly in line with the green transition in northern Sweden and the deteriorating security situation in Europe. The railway has thus taken on an more important role for civil and military defence, while also being central to climate-smart and efficient freight and passenger transport. The infrastructure is currently well maintained, but nevertheless suffers from maintenance debts due to insufficient funding over a long period of time.

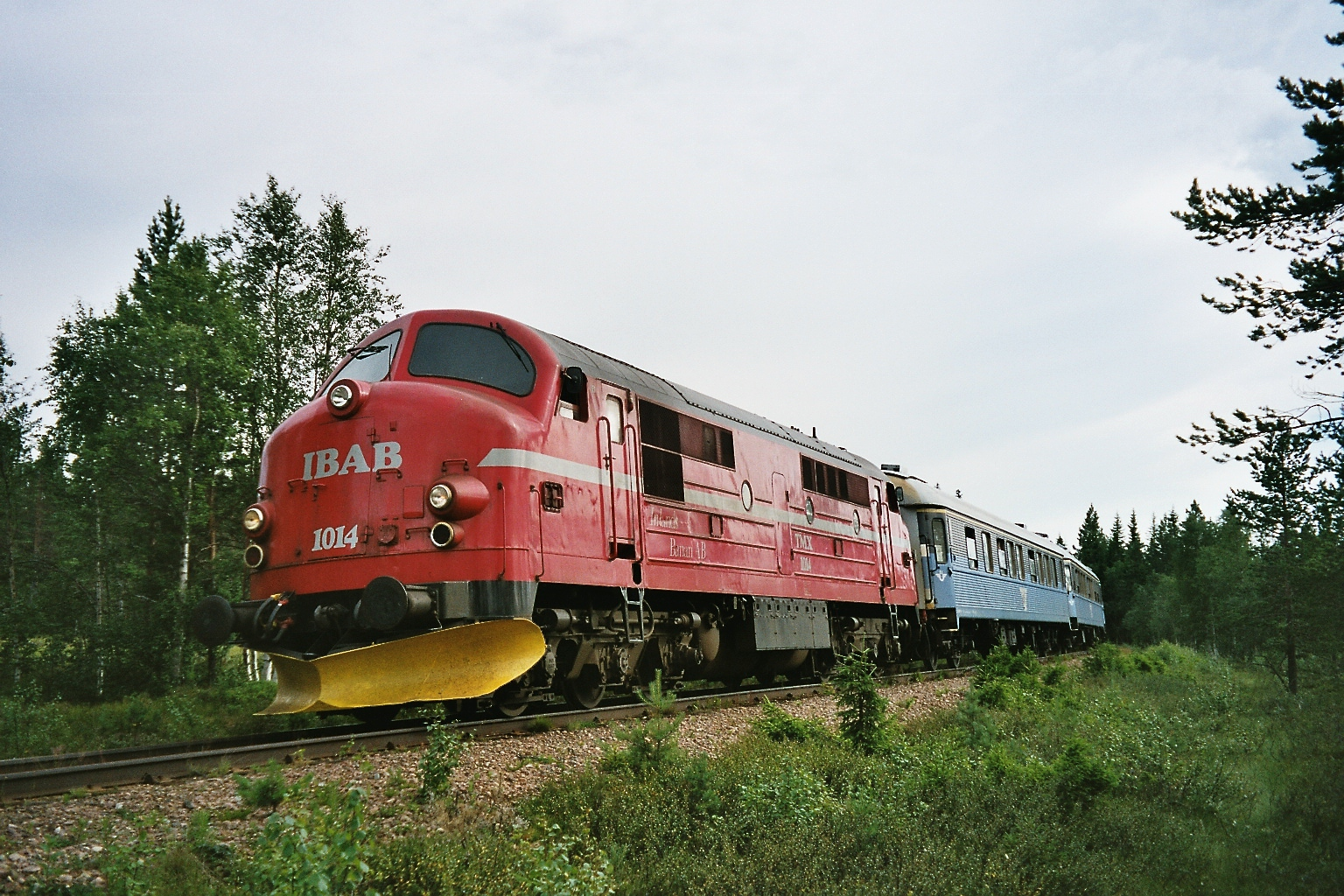
Train on Inlandsbanan

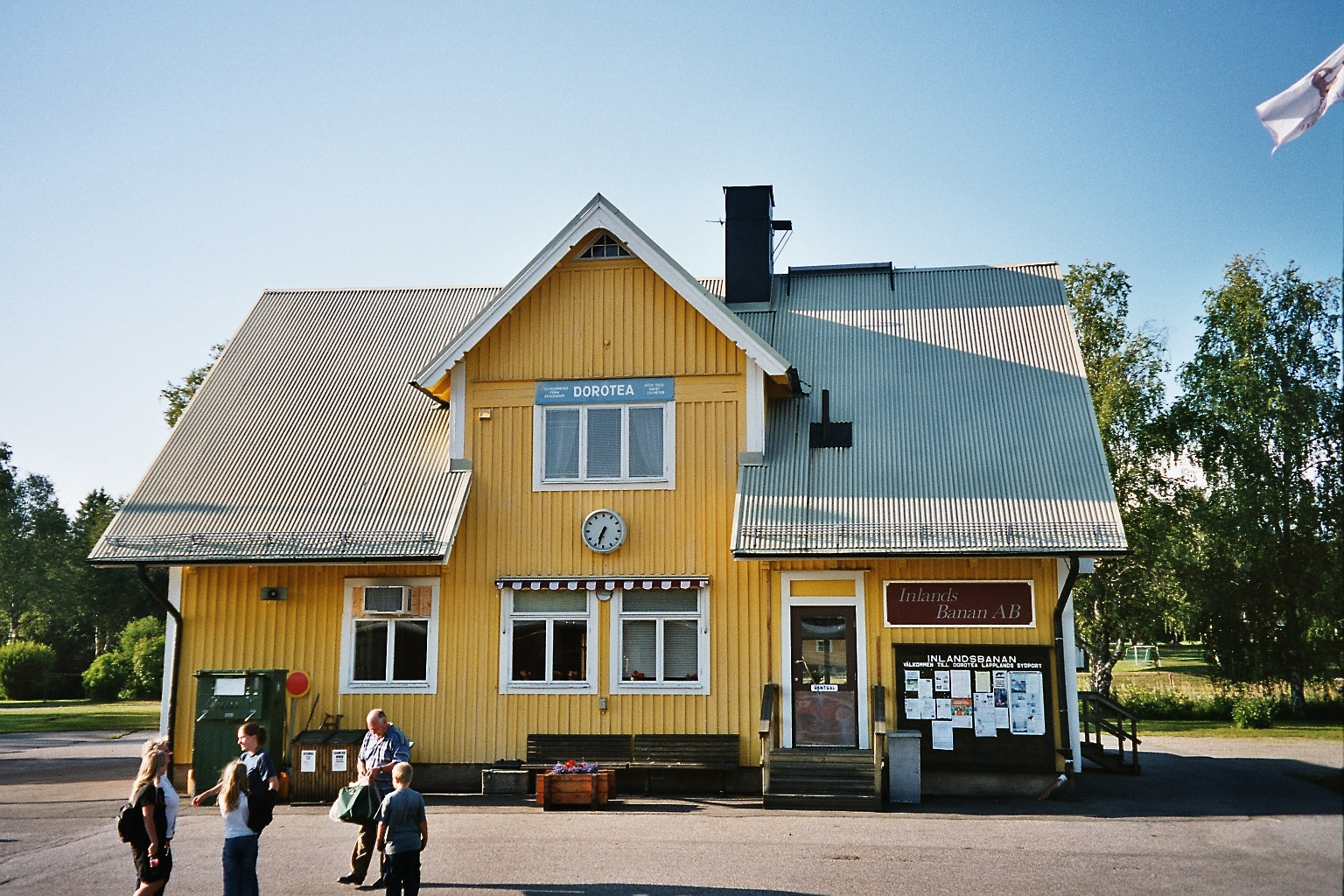
Dorotea station

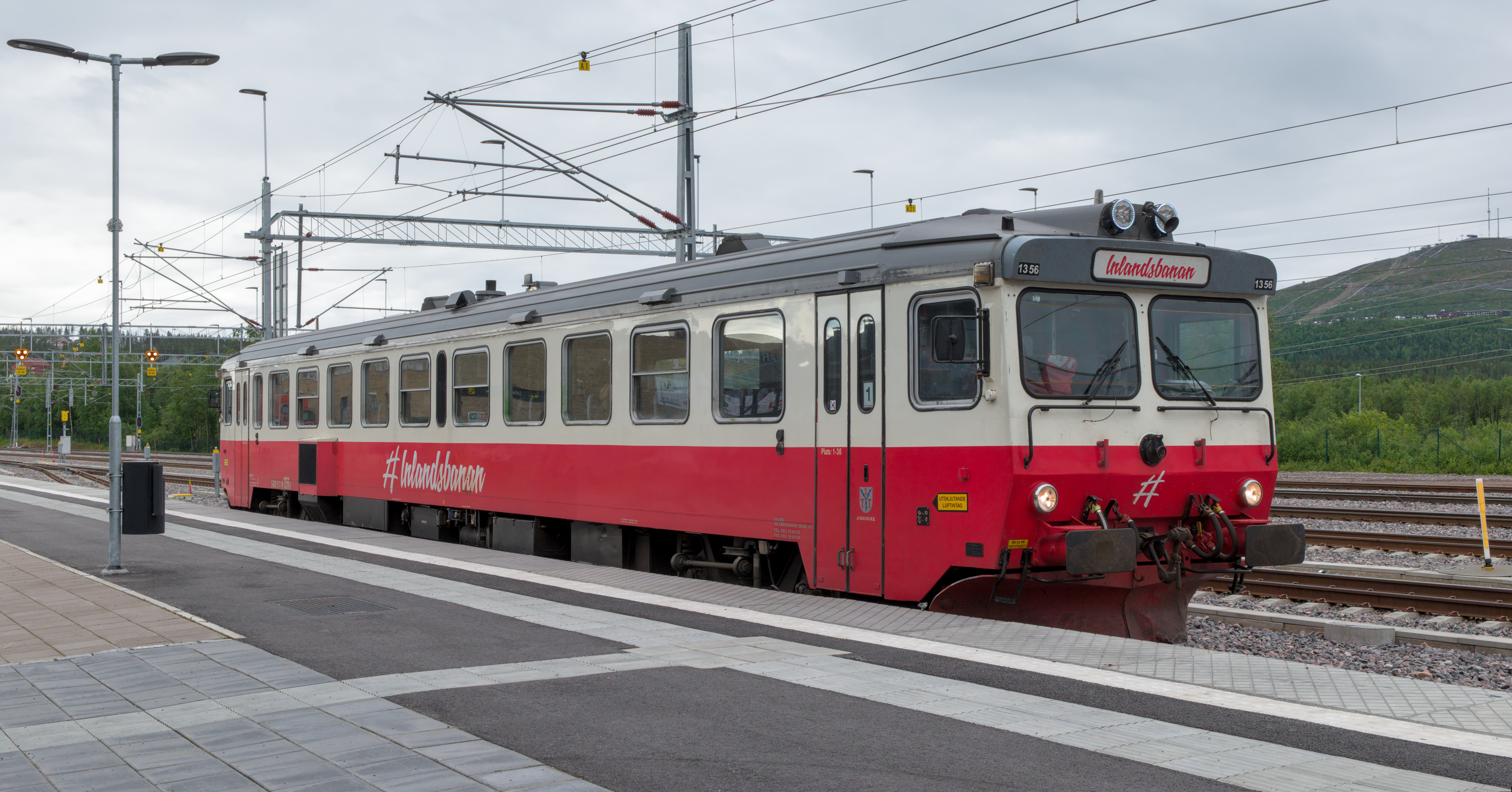
Y1 railcar in Gällivare

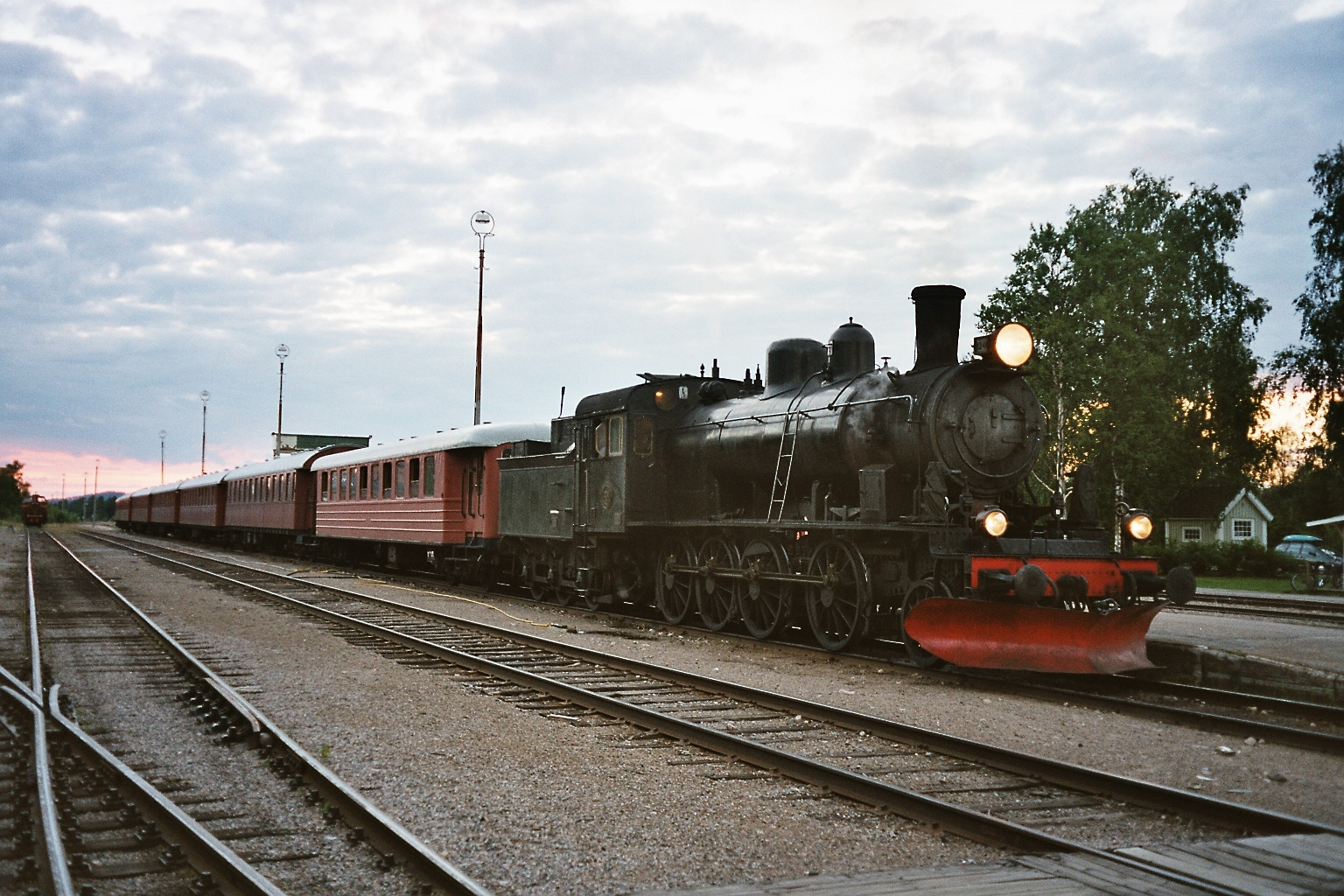
Steam locomotive on Inlandsbanan

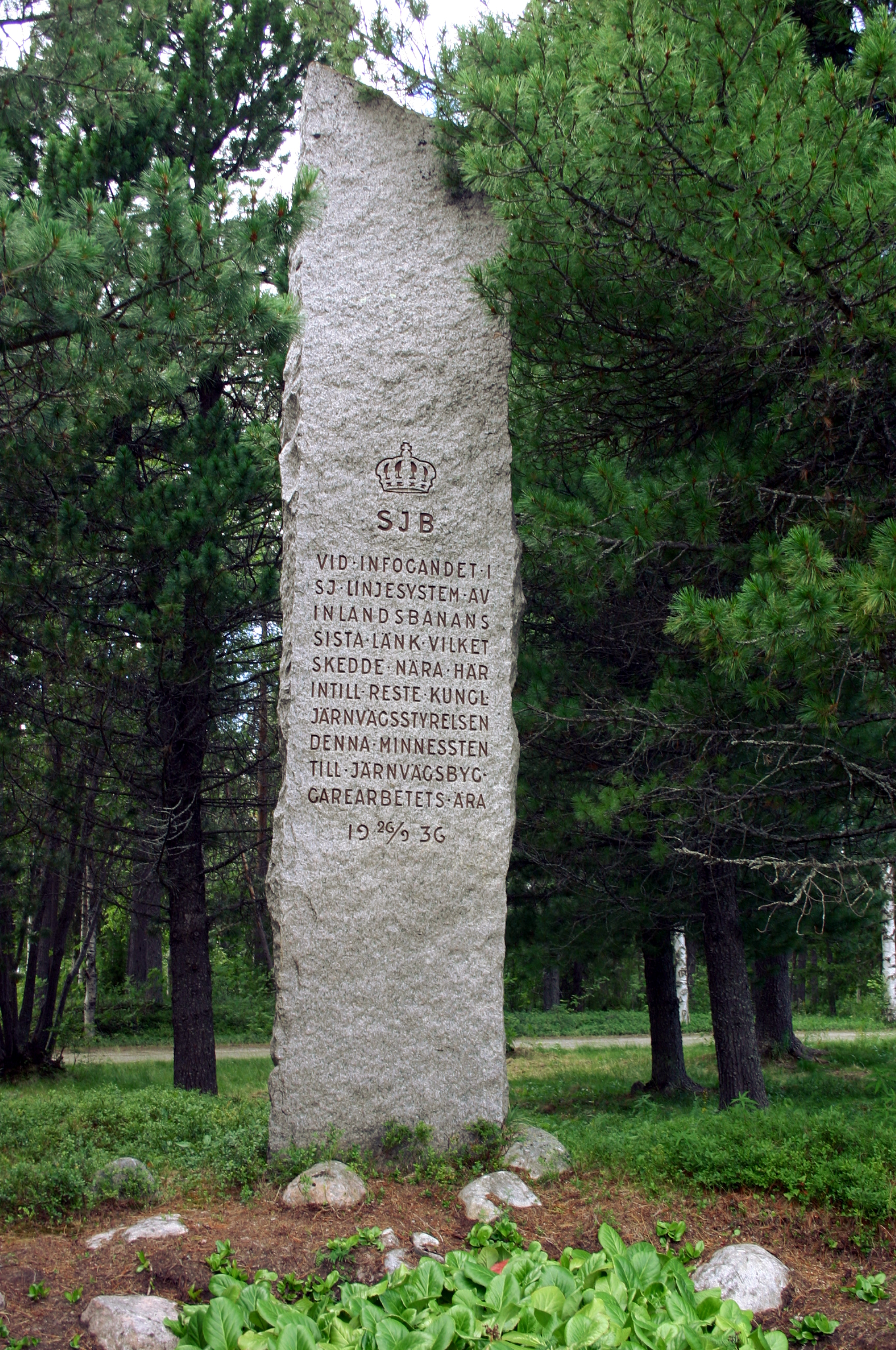
Kåbdalis memorial
