= Swedish Railway Museum =

Railway museum in Gävle, Sweden

- Sveriges Järnvägsmuseum
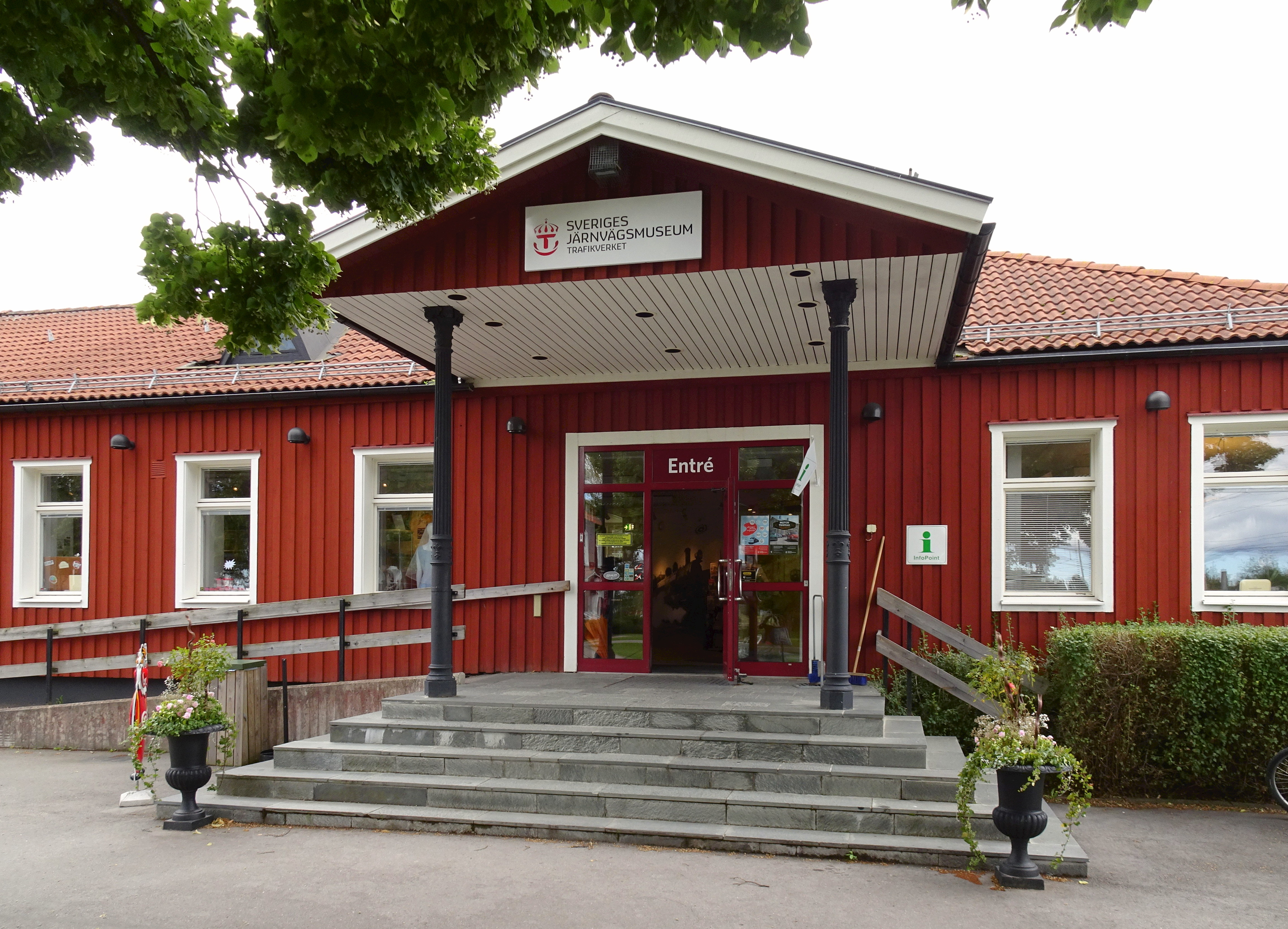
- Entrance building
- Established: 1915
- Location: Gävle, Gästrikland, Sweden
- Coordinates: 60°39′42″N 17°10′22″E
- Owner: Trafikverket
- Website: jarnvagsmuseet.se/en

The Swedish Railway Museum, (Swedish: Sveriges Järnvägsmuseum), in Gävle, Gästrikland, Sweden is the national museum for Sweden's railway history.

The Swedish Railway Museum is tasked with acquiring, preserving and supplying knowledge about Swedish railway history on the basis of the national collection. The museum is owned by Trafikverket (Swedish Transport Administration), which receives an annual sum for the museum's activities from the Government.

The museum has the use of two yards with tracks and several large buildings, including two round loco sheds and a sizeable workshop. The complex covers a total area of some 16,000 square metres.

== History ==
In 1915, the National Railway Board opened a railway museum in Stockholm. In 1942, a hall for locomotives and rolling stock was added at Tomteboda railway station in Stockholm.

The Swedish Railway Museum in Gävle was inaugurated on 5 June 1970.

The museum celebrated its 100th anniversary on 23 May 2015 with a festivity including historical reenactments. It closed in 2017 for renovations expected to take two years, but governmental crisis and the COVID-19 pandemic delayed the re-opening until 2024.

== Collections ==
Some items for the collection had already been acquired by the end of the 19th century. The present collection, which is one of the finest of its kind in the world, contains more than 100 locomotives, some 150 coaches, and several hundred other items of rolling stock. The best of these are displayed in the basic exhibition. Although most of the other items are kept in the stores, they are available for viewing by groups or by pre-arrangement.

Apart from locomotives and rolling stock, tools, instruments, and models, as well as crockery, textiles and art in specially built settings are displayed at the museum. Photographs form an exciting pathway into historical times. The museum collection of photographs contains several hundred thousand pictures, and the museum is currently transferring copies of negatives, glass plates into digital form to make them more available for the public.

== See also ==
- Railway Museum of Grängesberg
- List of museums in Sweden
