= Herrljunga railway station =

Railway station in Herrljunga, Sweden

Herrljunga C
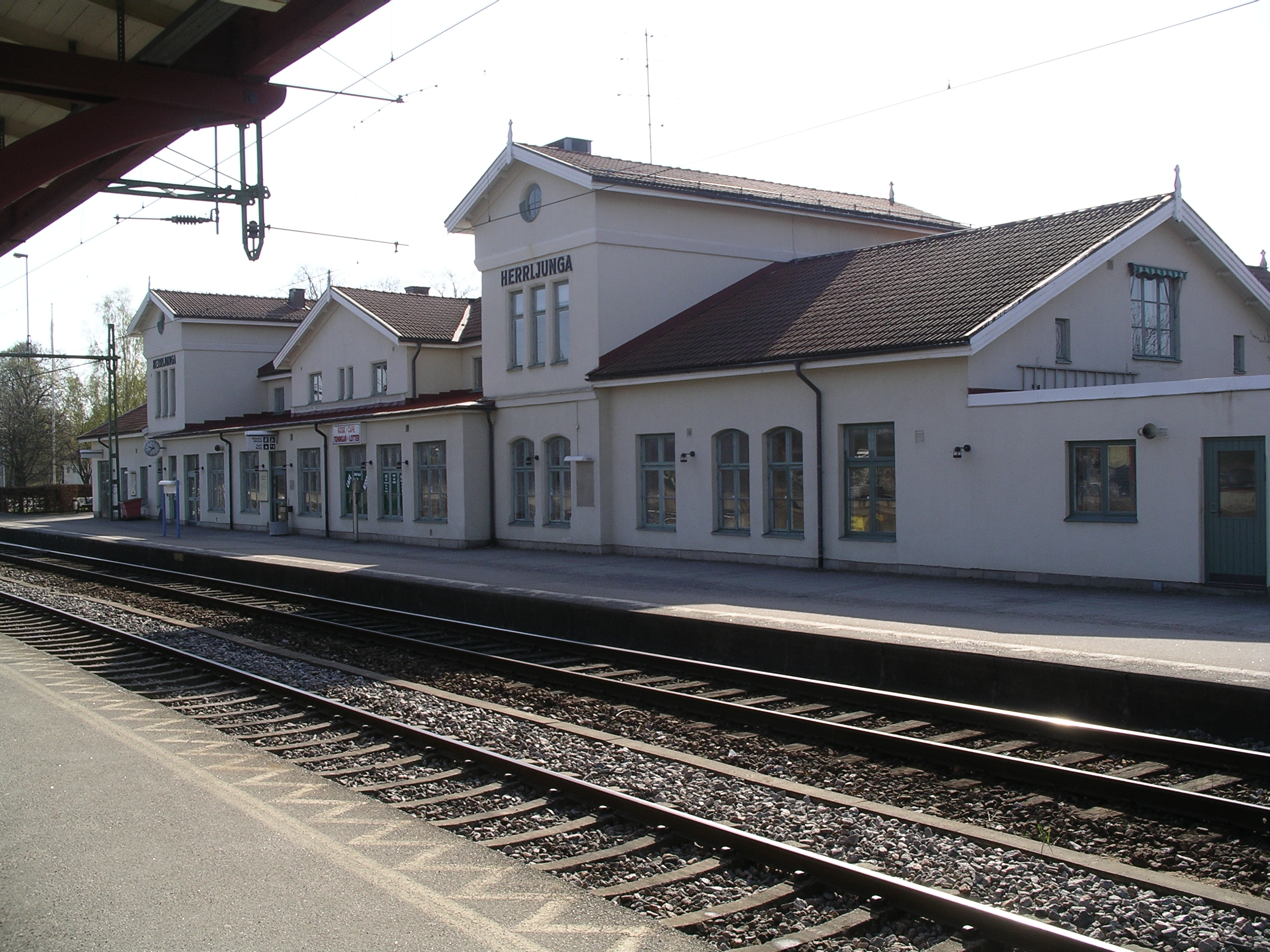
- Station building

General information
- Location: Västra Götaland County; Sweden
- Coordinates: 58°4′44″N 13°1′16″E
- Elevation: 110 metres (360 ft)
- Owner: Jernhusen
- Transit authority: Västtrafik
- Lines: Western Main Line; Älvsborg Line
- Tracks: 7
- Connections: Bus

Construction
- Accessible: Yes
- Architect: Adolf W. Edelsvärd

Other information
- Station code: Hr

History
- Opened: 1862

Services
| Preceding station | SJ | Following station |
|---|---|---|
| Falköping towards Stockholm C via Örebro C | Mälaren Line and Western Main Line | Vårgårda towards Göteborg C |
| Skövde towards Stockholm C | Western Main Line | Göteborg C Terminus |
| Skövde towards Umeå | Night train | Göteborg C Terminus |
| Skövde towards Duved | Night train | Göteborg C Terminus |
| Skövde towards Stockholm C | Stockholm-Uddevalla | Göteborg C towards Uddevalla |
| Preceding station | Long distance trains | Following station |
| Falköping towards Stockholm Central | VR | Alingsås towards Gothenburg Central |
| Preceding station | Västtågen | Following station |
| Vårgårda towards Göteborg C | Gothenburg-Skövde Line | Floby towards Skövde C |
| Vårgårda towards Göteborg C | Gothenburg-Nässjö Line | Floby towards Nässjö C |
| Vedum towards Uddevalla | Uddevalla-Borås-Varberg Line | Ljung towards Varberg C |
| Alingsås towards Göteborg C | Gothenburg-Lidköping-Mariestad-Örebro Line | Vedum towards Örebro C |
Location

Herrljunga railway station is located in the town of Herrljunga, Sweden, at the intersection of the Western Main Line and the Älvsborg Line. Some fast long-distance trains stop here, and also regional trains in multiple directions. The station is located around 200 metres (660 ft) from the traditional midpoint of the town. Regional buses stop nearby.

Railway traffic started in 1859 when the Western Main Line between the two largest cities of Sweden reached the place, with traffic all the way 1862. But train stops started in 1862 with a temporary station building, related to the connection of the Borås–Herrljunga railway. The Borås–Herrljunga railway opened for traffic 1863, and the Uddevalla–Herrljunga railway opened for traffic 1866, all its way 1867. The two latter railways now has a common name, the Älvsborg Line.

The station building is originally from 1864 but has been added to a few times. Herrljunga is a railway town, created based on its location at a railway junction. The present town was a small rural church village before the railway construction.
