= Älvsborg Line =

Railway line in Sweden

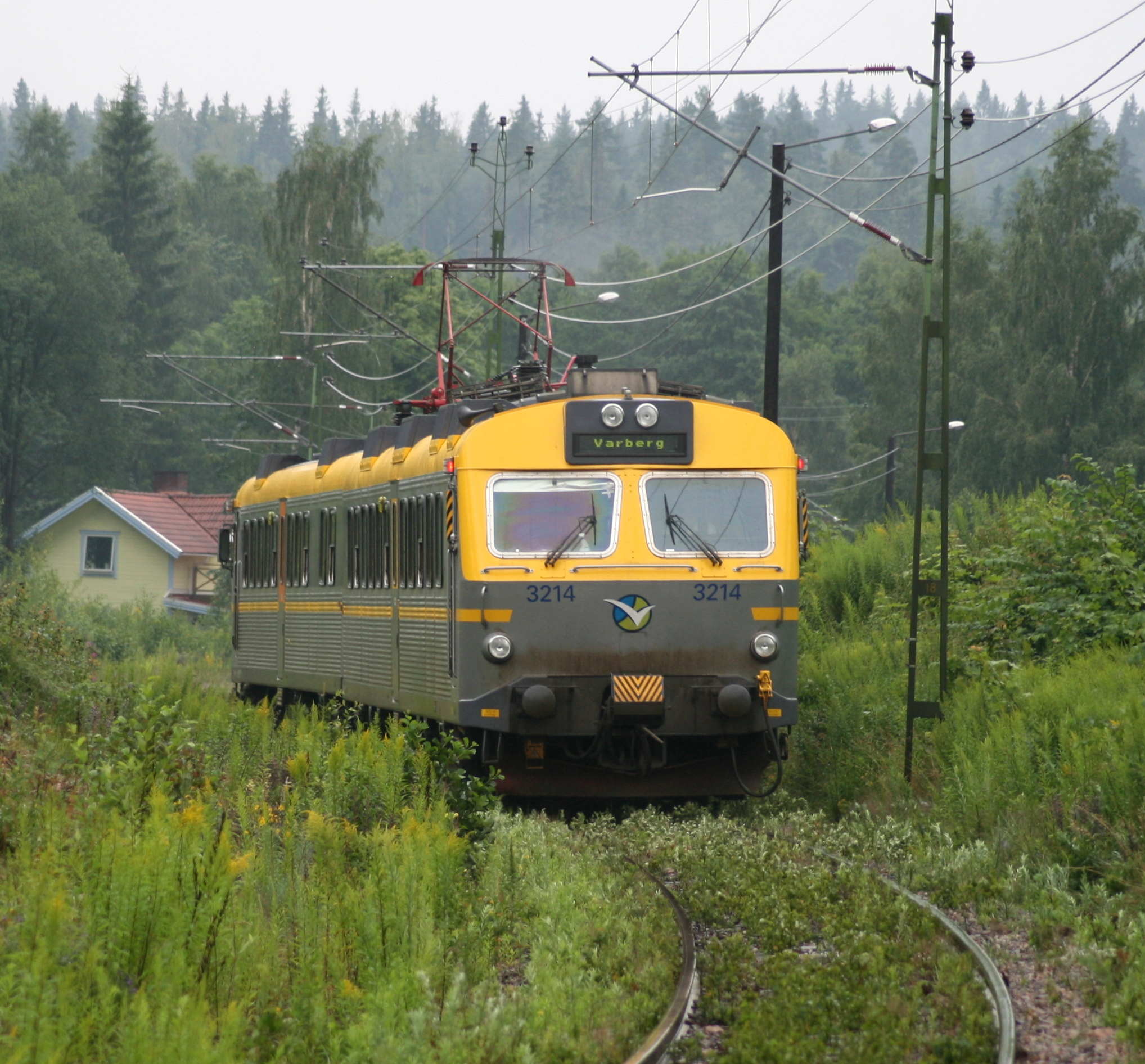
- The Älvsborg Line north of Borås

Overview
- Native name: Älvsborgsbanan
- Status: Operational
- Owner: Swedish Transport Administration
- Locale: Västra Götaland County, Sweden
- Termini: Uddevalla; Borås
- Stations: 15

Service
- Type: Railway
- Operator(s): Västtrafik, SJ AB
- Rolling stock: X12, X14, X50

History
- Opened: 1863 (Borås–Herrljunga); 1867 (Herrljunga–Uddevalla)

Technical
- Line length: 133 km (83 mi)
- Number of tracks: 1
- Character: Single track
- Track gauge: 1,435 mm (4 ft 8 1/2 in)
- Old gauge: 1,217 mm (3 ft 11 29/32 in) (until 1898–1900)
- Electrification: 15 kV 16.7 Hz AC
- Operating speed: Up to 160 km/h (99 mph)

The Älvsborg Line (Swedish: Älvsborgsbanan) is a 133-kilometre (83 mi) railway line between Uddevalla and Borås in Sweden. The crescent-shaped single-track line passes through Vänersborg and Herrljunga, connecting to various lines including the Bohus Line, the Norway/Vänern Line, the Kinnekulle Line, the Western Main Line, the Coast-to-Coast Line, and the Viskadal Line.

The line has 15 passenger stations: Uddevalla, Öxnered, Vänersborg, Vargön, Grästorp, Vara, Vedum, Herrljunga, Ljung, Torpåkra, Mollaryd, Borgstena, Fristad, Knalleland, and Borås.

== History ==
=== Construction ===
The Älvsborg Line originated as two separate private railways. The southern section from Borås to Herrljunga was built by the Borås–Herrljunga Railway (Borås–Herrljunga Järnväg, BHJ), which was founded in 1856, the same year the first section of the Western Main Line opened. When the route of the Western Main Line was finalized to pass through Vårgårda and Alingsås rather than Borås, it became necessary to connect Borås via a branch line.

The 42-kilometre (26 mi) Borås–Herrljunga section opened on 30 July 1863. The northern section from Herrljunga to Uddevalla was built by the Uddevalla–Vänersborg–Herrljunga Railway (Uddevalla–Vänersborg–Herrljunga Järnväg, UVHJ) and opened in 1867, measuring 92 km (57 mi). Both railways were built with an unusual track gauge of 1,217 mm (3 ft 11 29/32 in), equivalent to four English feet. The only other Swedish railways to use this gauge were a few short lines in Hälsingland.

=== The "Oat Railway" ===
During its early decades, the line became known colloquially as the "Oat Railway" (Havrebanan) due to its importance for Sweden's oat export trade. Oats grown on the Västgöta Plain were transported by rail to Uddevalla, where they were shipped abroad, primarily to London to feed the city's cab horses.

=== Gauge conversion and merger ===
The unusual gauge created operational difficulties as other railways in Borås (to Varberg, Gothenburg, and Svenljunga) were built to standard gauge. In 1896, the Borås–Herrljunga Railway decided to convert to standard gauge, and the UVHJ followed suit. The conversion was completed in 1898–1900, with traffic continuing during construction by transferring passengers and goods between narrow-gauge and standard-gauge trains at the point where work had progressed.

In 1919, the Borås–Herrljunga Railway and the Varberg–Borås Railway established joint management, and in 1930 they merged to form the Varberg–Borås–Herrljunga Railway (VBHJ).

=== Nationalization and electrification ===
Both the VBHJ and the UVHJ were nationalized and taken over by the Swedish State Railways in 1940, as part of the broader nationalization of Swedish private railways that occurred between 1940 and 1952. The entire line was electrified in 1949 using the Swedish standard of 15 kV 16.7 Hz AC. X7 electric multiple units were introduced, later supplemented by X16/X17 railbuses.

=== Recent developments ===
Several alignment changes have been made over the years. In 1900, the entry curve from Borås at Herrljunga was modified because it was too sharp for standard-gauge rolling stock. In 1970, a tunnel was built in Uddevalla to accommodate a new motorway. In 2006, the alignment at Öxnered was modified in connection with a new, faster route on the Norway/Vänern Line toward Gothenburg, and a triangle junction was built to allow trains to run between Trollhättan and Uddevalla.

During 2021, the stretch between Herrljunga and Borås was renovated to a higher standard, including the replacement of manual train dispatching (System M) with automatic train dispatching (System H).

In 2023, the Älvsborg Line was blocked in Vänersborg when the movable bridge there was deemed unsafe to operate. Reopening was planned for 2025.

== Operations ==
Västtrafik operates regional train services on the entire line, typically using X12, X14, and X50 electric multiple units. Trains operate in various configurations on all or part of the route between Varberg, Borås, and Uddevalla. SJ AB operates one weekday train between Uddevalla and Herrljunga continuing to Stockholm on the Western Main Line, using X2000 or SJ 3000 trainsets; in summer, this service extends to Strömstad.

Due to its relatively low standard and slow speed, few freight trains use this line, instead traveling via Gothenburg and the Western Main Line. Some freight trains are diverted to this line when the Western Main Line is closed for maintenance.

== Infrastructure ==
The maximum speed is 160 km/h (99 mph) between Håkantorp and Herrljunga and 140 km/h (87 mph) between Öxnered and Ryr; elsewhere it does not exceed 110 km/h (68 mph).

Platform lengths vary along the line: approximately 120 metres between Vargön and Vedum and at Borgstena and Fristad; 70 metres at Ljung and Knalleland; and only 30 metres at Torpåkra and Mollaryd. The major stations at Uddevalla, Öxnered, Vänersborg, Herrljunga, and Borås have platforms longer than 120 metres.

== See also ==
- Rail transport in Sweden
- Viskadal Line
