= Skövde railway station =

Railway station in Skövde, Sweden

Skövde C
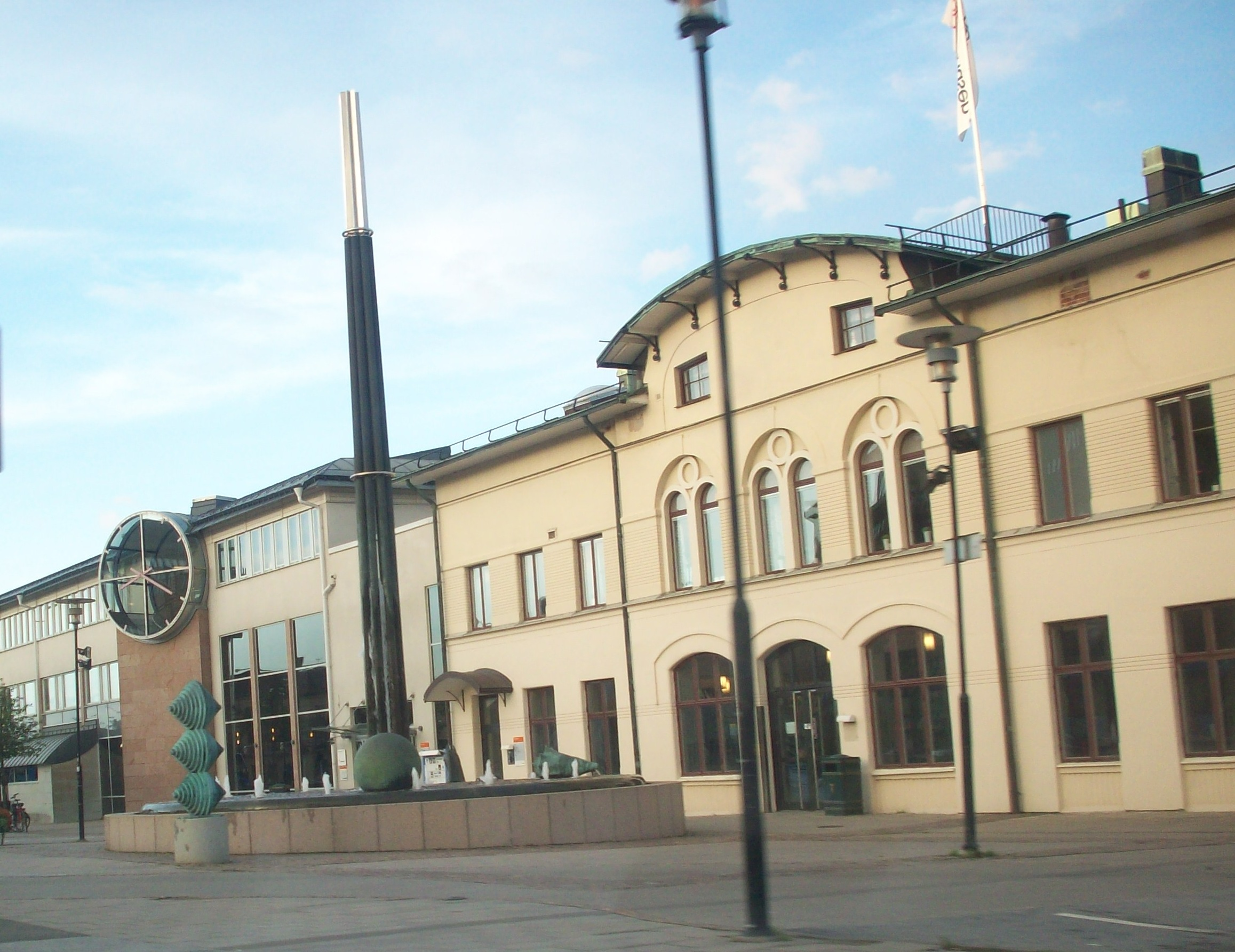
- Station building

General information
- Location: Skövde Municipality; Sweden
- Coordinates: 58°23′22″N 13°51′7″E
- Elevation: 140 m (460 ft)
- Owner: Jernhusen (station infrastructure); Trafikverket (rail infrastructure)
- Line: Göteborg-Stockholm
- Platforms: 2
- Tracks: 3
- Train operators: SJ

History
- Opened: 1859; 167 years ago

Services
| Preceding station | SJ | Following station |
|---|---|---|
| Töreboda towards Stockholm C via Örebro C | Mälaren Line and Western Main Line | Falköping towards Göteborg C |
| Katrineholm C towards Stockholm C | Western Main Line | Herrljunga C towards Göteborg C |
| Katrineholm C towards Stockholm C | Stockholm-Uddevalla | Herrljunga C towards Uddevalla |
| Preceding station | Long distance trains | Following station |
| Katrineholm C towards Stockholm C | VR | Falköping towards Göteborg C |
| Preceding station | Västtågen | Following station |
| Falköping towards Göteborg C | Gothenburg-Skövde Line | Terminus |
| Falköping towards Nässjö C | Nässjö Line | Terminus |
Location

Skövde railway station is located in the city of Skövde, Sweden, along the Western Main Line. It is the main city of the Skaraborg region. Fast long-distance trains stop here, and there are regional trains and buses to other cities and villages in the region. There are not anymore any other railway apart from the mainline going from Skövde. The station is located around 200 metres (660 ft) from the traditional midpoint of the city. City buses and regional buses stop nearby.

Railway traffic started in 1859 when the Western Main Line between the two largest cities of Sweden got a station here. Historically a few other railways connected to Skövde, to Skara and to Karlsborg, but they are decommissioned. Skövde was in the Middle Ages an important pilgrim city, but declined much after the reformation. The railway made it grow again and later became the largest city in Skaraborg. The station building is partly from 1859 but has been added to a few times.
