= IPSC Swedish Mini Rifle Championship =

Sport shooting competition in Sweden

The IPSC Swedish Mini Rifle Championship is an IPSC level 3 championship held once a year by the Swedish Dynamic Sports Shooting Association.

== Champions ==
The following is a list of current and previous champions.

=== Overall category ===
Year	Division	Gold	Silver	Bronze	Venue
2016	Open	(Sweden) Johan Hansen	(Sweden) Erik Bjälkvall	(Sweden) Mikael Schelén	Skepplanda Octoberfest, 22-23 October, Gothenburg
2016	Standard	(Sweden) Roland Dahlman	(Sweden) Daniel Olsson	(Sweden) Erik Larsson	Skepplanda Octoberfest, 22-23 October, Gothenburg
2017	Open	(Sweden) Per Wiklander	(Sweden) Erik Bjälkvall	(Sweden) Johan Hansen	Skepplanda Octoberfest, 21-22 October, Gothenburg
2017	Standard	(Sweden) Joakim Sand	(Sweden) Erik Larsson	(Sweden) Max Käär	Skepplanda Octoberfest, 21-22 October, Gothenburg
2018	Open	(Sweden) Peter Kastell	(Sweden) Johan Hansen	(Sweden) Jonatan Loman	Skepplanda Octoberfest, 20-21 October, Gothenburg
2018	Standard	(Sweden) Erik Larsson	(Sweden) Max Käär	(Sweden) Andreas Anderson	Skepplanda Octoberfest, 20-21 October, Gothenburg

=== Lady category ===
Year	Division	Gold	Silver	Bronze	Venue
2016	Open	(Sweden) Sofia Dohmen	(Sweden) Kristina Olsson	(Sweden) Sarah Grey	Skepplanda Octoberfest, 22-23 October, Gothenburg
2017	Open	(Sweden) Kristina Olsson	(Sweden) Maria Loman	(Sweden) Sofia Dohmen	Skepplanda Octoberfest, 21-22 October, Gothenburg
2018	Open	(Sweden) Pia Clerté	(Sweden) Maria Loman	(Sweden) Kristina Olsson	Skepplanda Octoberfest, 20-21 October, Gothenburg

=== Senior category ===
Year	Division	Gold	Silver	Bronze	Venue
2016	Open	(Sweden) Johan Hansen	(Sweden) Johan Lindberg	(Sweden) Per Bergfeldt	Skepplanda Octoberfest, 22-23 October, Gothenburg
2017	Open	(Sweden) Johan Hansen	(Sweden) Stefan Johannesson	(Sweden) Jens Sandberg	Skepplanda Octoberfest, 21-22 October, Gothenburg
2018	Open	(Sweden) Johan Hansen	(Sweden) Patrik Gren	(Sweden) Stefan Johannesson	Skepplanda Octoberfest, 20-21 October, Gothenburg

=== Super Senior category ===
Year	Division	Gold	Silver	Bronze	Venue
2016	Open	(Sweden) Per Jonasson	(Sweden) Robert Nordgren	(Sweden) Per-Olof Emanuelsson	Skepplanda Octoberfest, 22-23 October, Gothenburg

=== Team category ===
Year	Division	Gold	Silver	Bronze	Venue
2016	Open	Stockholm LVF (Erik Bjälkvall, Johan Hansen, Ulf Moen)	Södertörn SK (Mikael Schelén, Per Jonasson, Stefan Nordh, Thomas Kindhag)	Göteborgs Dynamiska Skyttar (David Ståhl, Erik Stjernlöf, John Hallbäck, Robert Andersson)	Skepplanda Octoberfest, 22-23 October, Gothenburg
2017	Open	Skepplanda SSF (Bjarne Larning, Joakim Wallin, Jonas Forslund, Marcus Molin)	Stockholm LVF (Erik Bjälkvall, Johan Hansen, Ulf Moen)	Uddevalla PSF (Christopher Samuelsson, David Andersson, Joakim Lindberg, Per-Erik Myrstrand)	Skepplanda Octoberfest, 21-22 October, Gothenburg
2018	Open	Stockholm LVF (Erik Bjälkvall, Jiro Nihei, Johan Hansen, Stilianos Simeonidis)	Göteborgs Polismäns IF (Joachim Nilsson, Patrik Fritzson, Robert Börjesson, Stefan Johannesson)	Uddevalla PSF (Christopher Samuelsson, David Andersson, Magnus Abelsson, Per-Erik Myrstrand)	Skepplanda Octoberfest, 20-21 October, Gothenburg

== See also ==
- Swedish Handgun Championship
- Swedish Rifle Championship
- Swedish Shotgun Championship
