= Katrineholm railway station =

Railway station in Katrineholm, Sweden

Katrineholm C
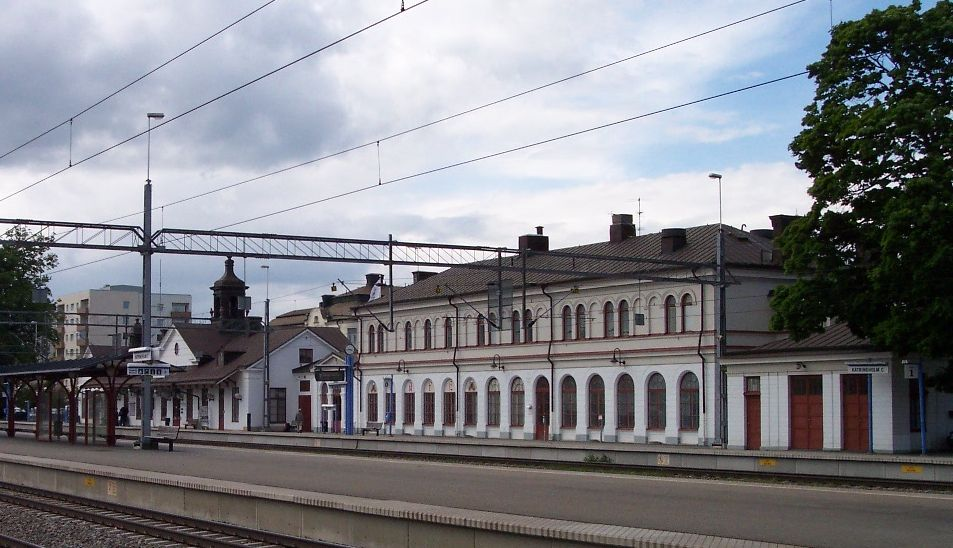
- Station building

General information
- Location: Katrineholm Municipality; Sweden
- Coordinates: 58°59′48″N 16°12′30″E
- Elevation: 45 m (148 ft)
- Owner: Jernhusen (station infrastructure); Trafikverket (rail infrastructure)
- Lines: Göteborg-Stockholm; Malmö-Katrineholm
- Platforms: 3
- Tracks: 4
- Train operators: SJ

History
- Opened: 1862; 164 years ago

Services
Preceding station	SJ	Following station
Södertälje syd towards Stockholm C	Western Main Line	Skövde towards Göteborg C
Södertälje syd towards Stockholm C	Värmland Line	Hallsberg towards Oslo
Södertälje syd towards Stockholm C	Stockholm-Uddevalla	Skövde towards Uddevalla
Södertälje syd towards Stockholm C	Southern Main Line	Norrköping C towards Köpenhamn H
Preceding station	Long distance trains	Following station
Södertälje syd towards Stockholm C	VR	Skövde towards Göteborg C
Stockholm C Terminus	Tågab	Hallsberg towards Karlstad C
Preceding station	Regional trains	Following station
Flen towards Stockholm C	Mälartåg	Vingåker towards Hallsberg
Flen towards Uppsala C	Mälartåg	Norrköping C towards Linköping C
Location

Katrineholm railway station is located in the town of Katrineholm, Sweden, at the Western Main Line and the endpoint of the Southern Main Line. Some fast long-distance trains stop here, and also regional trains in multiple directions. The station is located at the traditional midpoint of the town. Regional and city buses stop nearby.

Railway traffic started in 1862 when the Western Main Line between the two largest cities of Sweden opened for traffic reached the place, with traffic all the way same year. In 1866, the first part of the Southern Main Line from Katrineholm to Norrköping, later towards Malmö, was put into operation.

The station building is originally from 1862 but has been added to a few times, especially 1915. Katrineholm is a railway town, created based on its location at a railway junction. The present town location was countryside before the railway construction. The name Katrineholm comes from a nearby major farm with this name located 2 km (1 1/2 miles) northwest of the railway station.
