= IPSC Swedish Rifle Championship =

Sport shooting competition in Sweden

The IPSC Swedish Rifle Championship is an IPSC level 3 championship held once a year by the Swedish Dynamic Sports Shooting Association.

== Champions ==
The following is a list of current and previous champions.

=== Overall category ===
Year	Division	Gold	Silver	Bronze	Venue
2011	Open	(Sweden) Jörgen Andersson	(Sweden) Hans Holmqvist	(Sweden) Johan Hansen	Herrljunga
2011	Standard	(Sweden) Therry Ellgren	(Sweden) Jonas Björk	(Sweden) Patrik Alenklint	Herrljunga
2012	Open	(Sweden) Johan Hansen	(Sweden) Jörgen Andersson	(Sweden) Mikael Berglund	Malmö
2012	Standard	(Sweden) Jim Almqvist	(Sweden) Roland Dahlman	(Sweden) Johan Fredriksson	Malmö
2013	Open	(Sweden) Rasmus Gyllenberg	(Sweden) Hans Holmqvist	(Sweden) Mikael Berglund	Herrljunga
2013	Standard	(Sweden) Roland Dahlman	(Sweden) Johan Fredriksson	(Sweden) Johan Ström	Herrljunga
2014	Open	(Sweden) Johan Hansen	(Sweden) Gustav Person	(Sweden) Lars-Tony Skoog	Storsjödraget, Östersund
2014	Standard	(Sweden) Roland Dahlman	(Sweden) Johan Fredriksson	(Sweden) Johan Ström	Storsjödraget, Östersund
2015	No championship held				
2016	Open	(Sweden) Olle Ackehed	(Sweden) Hans Holmkvist	(Sweden) Mikael Schelén	Herrljunga
2016	Standard	(Sweden) Roland Dahlman	(Sweden) Johan Fredriksson	(Sweden) Stilianos Simeonidis	Herrljunga
2017	Open	(Sweden) Olle Ackehed	(Sweden) Marcus Madsen	(Sweden) Gustav Persson	Malmö
2017	Standard	(Sweden) Johan Fredriksson	(Sweden) Roland Dahlman	(Sweden) Daniel Olsson	Malmö
2018	No championship held				
2019	Open	(Sweden) Olle Ackehed	(Sweden) Gustav Persson	(Sweden) Marcus Madsen	Dackefejden, Kalmar/Nybro
2019	Standard	(Sweden) Johan Fredriksson	(Sweden) Hans Holmkvist	(Sweden) Joakim Sand	Dackefejden, Kalmar/Nybro
2020	No championship held				
2021	No championship held				
2022	Open	(Sweden) Mikael Schelén	(Sweden) Andre du Toit	(Sweden) Olle Ackehed	Malmö
2022	Standard	(Sweden) Eric Johan Fredriksson	(Sweden) Hans Holmkvist	(Sweden) Daniel Olsson	Malmö

=== Lady category ===
Year	Division	Gold	Silver	Bronze	Venue
2016	Open	(Sweden) Pia Clerté	(Sweden) Tina Oskarsson	(Sweden) Kristina Olsson	Herrljunga
2017	Open	(Sweden) Pia Clerté	(Sweden) Kristina Olsson	(Sweden) Marianne Hansen	Malmö
2018	No championship held				
2019	Open	(Sweden) Pia Clerté	(Sweden) Kristina Olsson	(Sweden) Louise Lidholm	Dackefejden, Kalmar/Nybro

=== Senior category ===
Year	Division	Gold	Silver	Bronze	Venue
2016	Open	(Sweden) Johan Hansen	(Sweden) Per Bergfeldt	(Sweden) Leif Madsen	Herrljunga
2017	Open	(Sweden) Johan Hansen	(Sweden) Patrik Gren	(Sweden) Per Bergfeldt	Malmö
2018	No championship held				
2019	Open	(Sweden) Leif Madsen	(Sweden) Johan Hansen	(Sweden) Per Bergfeldt	Dackefejden, Kalmar/Nybro

== See also ==
- Swedish Handgun Championship
- Swedish Mini Rifle Championship
- Swedish Shotgun Championship
