= IPSC Swedish Shotgun Championship =

Swedish sport shooting competition

The IPSC Swedish Shotgun Championship is an IPSC level 3 championship held once a year by the Swedish Dynamic Sports Shooting Association.

== Champions ==
The following is a list of current and previous champions.

=== Overall category ===
Year	Division	Gold	Silver	Bronze	Venue
2014	Open	(Sweden) Johan Hansen	(Sweden) Gustav Person	(Sweden) Erik Bjalkvall	SM IPSC Hagel 2014, 16 November, Stockholm
2014	Standard	(Sweden) Patrik Gren	(Sweden) Robert Söderström	(Sweden) Kent Westerlund	SM IPSC Hagel 2014, 16 November, Stockholm
2014	Standard Manual	(Sweden) Teddi Sörensson	(Sweden) Jaakko Kangasvieri	(Sweden) Robert Andersson	SM IPSC Hagel 2014, 16 November, Stockholm
2015	Open	(Sweden) Gustav Person	(Sweden) Erik Bjalkvall	(Sweden) Daniel Falk	Blacksmith Shotgun Open 2015, 11-12 July, Eskilstuna
2015	Standard	(Sweden) Patrik Gren	(Sweden) Thomas Edvardsson	(Sweden) Johan Ström	Blacksmith Shotgun Open 2015, 11-12 July, Eskilstuna
2015	Standard Manual	(Sweden) Teddi Sörensson	(Sweden) Jimmi Svensson	(Sweden) Robert Andersson	Blacksmith Shotgun Open 2015, 11-12 July, Eskilstuna
2016	Open	(Sweden) Johan Hansen	(Sweden) Erik Bjalkvall	(Sweden) Stefan Ekstedt	MSG - Swedish Shotgun Championships 2016, 14-15 May, Malmö
2016	Standard	(Sweden) Robert Söderström	(Sweden) Thomas Edvardsson	(Sweden) Henrik Kedfors	MSG - Swedish Shotgun Championships 2016, 14-15 May, Malmö
2016	Standard Manual	(Sweden) Teddi Sörensson	(Sweden) Roberth Andersson	(Sweden) Jimmy Svensson	MSG - Swedish Shotgun Championships 2016, 14-15 May, Malmö
2017	Open	(Sweden) Johan Hansen	(Sweden) Stefan Ekstedt	(Sweden) Roberth Andersson	Blacksmith Shotgun Open 2017, 16 July, Eskilstuna
2017	Standard	(Sweden) Thomas Edvardsson	(Sweden) Magnus Gustafsson	(Sweden) Robert Söderström	Blacksmith Shotgun Open 2017, 16 July, Eskilstuna
2017	Standard Manual	(Sweden) Teddi Sörensson	(Sweden) Jimmy Svensson	(Sweden) Henrik Jonsson	Blacksmith Shotgun Open 2017, 16 July, Eskilstuna
2018					Laholm Open Shotgun, 12-13 May, Varberg

=== Lady category ===
Year	Division	Gold	Silver	Bronze	Venue
2017	Open	(Sweden) Marianne Hansen	(Sweden) Pia Clerté	(Sweden) Erika Härnström	Blacksmith Shotgun Open 2017, 16 July, Eskilstuna

=== Senior category ===
Year	Division	Gold	Silver	Bronze	Venue
2014	Open	(Sweden) Johan Hansen	(Sweden) Stefan Ekstedt	(Sweden) Dick Qvarnström	SM IPSC Hagel 2014, 16 November, Stockholm
2015	Open	(Sweden) Dick Qvarnström	(Sweden) Mikael Bergqvist	(Sweden) Walter Kitzinger	Blacksmith Shotgun Open 2015, 11-12 July, Eskilstuna
2016	Open	(Sweden) Johan Hansen	(Sweden) Stefan Ekstedt	(Sweden) Dick Qvarnström	MSG - Swedish Shotgun Championships 2016, 14-15 May, Malmö
2017	Open	(Sweden) Johan Hansen	(Sweden) Stefan Ekstedt	(Sweden) Dick Qvarnström	Blacksmith Shotgun Open 2017, 16 July, Eskilstuna
2017	Standard	(Sweden) Bo Nilsson	(Sweden) Bengt Petersson	(Sweden) Kai Rämö	Blacksmith Shotgun Open 2017, 16 July, Eskilstuna
2017	Standard Manual	(Sweden) Stefan Grahn	(Sweden) Leif Johansson	(Sweden) Tarmo Kopakka	Blacksmith Shotgun Open 2017, 16 July, Eskilstuna

=== Team category ===
Year	Division	Gold	Silver	Bronze	Venue
2014	Open	Stockholms LVF (Erik Bjälkvall, Håkan Johansson, Jim Larsén, Jonas Thambert)	Västerorts Dynamiska Skyttar (Johan Hansen, Marianne Hansen, Stefan Ekstedt)	Västsvenska Dynamiker (Gustav Persson, Mikael Berglund, Niklas Arabäck, Peter Larsson)	SM IPSC Hagel 2014, 16 November, Stockholm
2014	Standard	S:t Eskils Skyttar (Daniel Lindström, Fredrik Lindblad, Stefan Eriksson, Thomas Edvardsson)	Malmö Skyttegille #1 (Andreas Kräling, Daniel Thunell, Robert Söderström)	Malmö Skyttegille #2 (Anders Rohlen, Joakim Sand, Per Wiklander)	SM IPSC Hagel 2014, 16 November, Stockholm
2014	Standard Manual	IPSC Örebro (Björn Larsson, Jaakko Kangasvieri, Jimmy Svensson, Stefan Grahn)	Södertörns SK (Fredrik Lundbeck, Robert Andersson, Stefan Vestman)	Stockholms LVF (Fredrick Johansson, Henrik Jansson, Karl Ericson)	SM IPSC Hagel 2014, 16 November, Stockholm
2015	Open	Västsvenska Dynamiker (Andreas Anderson, Gustav Persson, Niklas Arabäck, Peter Larsson)	Stockholms LVF (Erik Bjälkvall, Jim Larsén, Johan Hansen, Jonas Thambert)	Uppsala DS (Daniel Falk, Jakob Ericsson, Martin Pärnaste)	Blacksmith Shotgun Open 2015, 11-12 July, Eskilstuna
2015	Standard	S:t Eskils Skyttar #1 (Daniel Lindström, Michael Bjurshagen, Stefan Eriksson, Thomas Edvardsson)	S:t Eskils Skyttar #2 (Fredrik Lindblad, Henrik Springare, Jari Asu, Mathias Henricsson)	Linköping Shooting Club (Anders Rothman, Fredrik Pettersson, Johan Ström, Kjetil Larsen)	Blacksmith Shotgun Open 2015, 11-12 July, Eskilstuna
2015	Standard Manual	IPSC Örebro (Björn Larsson, Jaakko Kangasvieri, Jimmy Svensson, Stefan Grahn)	S:t Eskils Skyttar (Carl Lundmark, Tarmo Kopakka)	-	Blacksmith Shotgun Open 2015, 11-12 July, Eskilstuna
2016	Open	Stockholm LVF (Erik Bjälkvall, Jim Larsén, Johan Hansen, Marianne Hansen)	Västsvenska Dynamiker (Andreas Anderson, Gustav Persson, Niklas Arabäck, Peter Larsson)	Rosersberg PK (Christian Wangel, Magnus Gustafsson, Magnus Lindblå)	MSG - Swedish Shotgun Championships 2016, 14-15 May, Malmö
2016	Standard	S:t Eskils Skyttar (Mathias Henricsson, Michael Bjurshagen, Stefan Eriksson, Thomas Edvardsson)	Malmö Skyttegille (Andreas Kräling, Mats Ahlqvist, Per Wiklander, Robert Söderström)	Linköping Shooting Club (Fredrik Pettersson, Johan Ström, Kjetil Larsen)	MSG - Swedish Shotgun Championships 2016, 14-15 May, Malmö
2016	Standard Manual	IPSC Örebro (Björn Larsson, Jaakko Kangasvieri, Jimmy Svensson, Stefan Grahn)	Göteborgs Dynamiska Skyttar (Erik Stjernlöf, Fredrik Poller, Robert Andersson)	Malmö Skyttegille (Daniel Thunell, Joakim Sand, Teddi Sörensson, Ulf Bjelkengren)	MSG - Swedish Shotgun Championships 2016, 14-15 May, Malmö
2017	Open	Stockholm LVF (Jim Larsén, Johan Hansen, Jonas Thambert. Marianne Hansen)	Västsvenska Dynamiker (Andreas Anderson, Bengt Dahl, Dick Qvarnström, Niklas Arabäck)	Uppsala DS (Daniel Falk, Gabriel Hübinette, Jakob Ericsson, Pia Clerté)	Blacksmith Shotgun Open 2017, 16 July, Eskilstuna
2017	Standard	S:t Eskils Skyttar #1 (Daniel Lindström, Mathias Henricsson, Michael Bjurshagen, Thomas Edvardsson)	S:t Eskils Skyttar #2 (Magnus Gustafsson, Patrik Dzoic, Stefan Eriksson, Therese Bjurshagen)	Malmö Skyttegille (Bo Nilsson, Robert Söderström, Sofia Dohmen, Örjan Lindgren)	Blacksmith Shotgun Open 2017, 16 July, Eskilstuna
2017	Standard Manual	IPSC Örebro (Björn Larsson, Jaakko Kangasvieri, Jimmy Svensson, Stefan Grahn)	Jönköpings PK (Henrik Jonsson, Martin Bergman, Per-Olov Jonsson, Robert Pajnic)	Göteborgs Dynamiska Skyttar (Erik Larsson, Fredrik Poller, Robert Andersson)	Blacksmith Shotgun Open 2017, 16 July, Eskilstuna

== See also ==
- Swedish Handgun Championship
- Swedish Mini Rifle Championship
- Swedish Rifle Championship
