= Vedum =

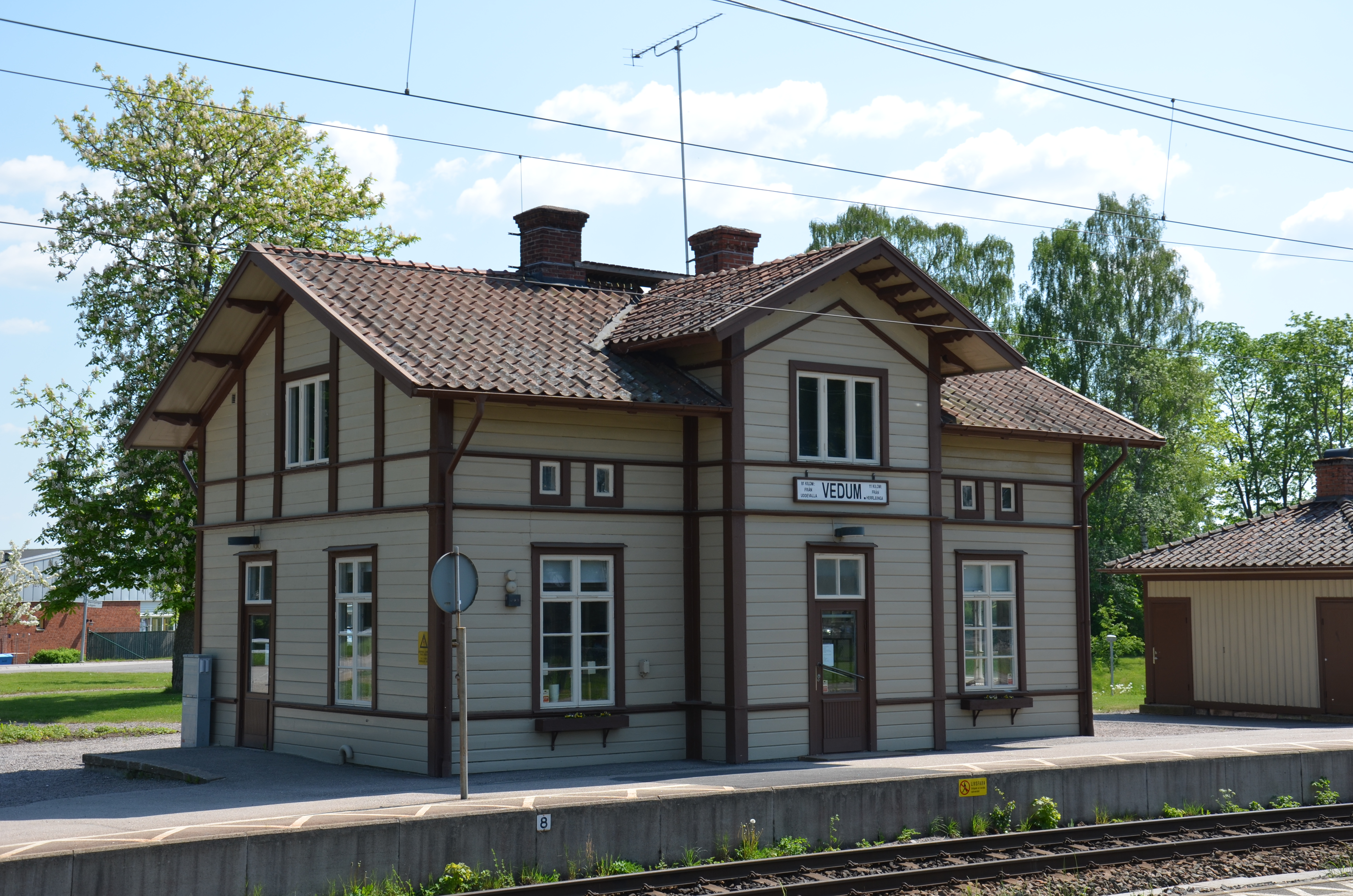
- Vedums railway station in Sweden

- Location within Västra Götaland Location within Sweden
- Coordinates: 58°10′N 12°59′E
- Country: Sweden
- Province: Västergötland
- County: Västra Götaland County
- Municipality: Vara Municipality

Area
  - Total: 1.07 km^{2} (0.41 sq mi)

Population (31 December 2010)
  - Total: 926
  - Density: 868/km^{2} (2,250/sq mi)
- Time zone: UTC+1 (CET)
  - Summer (DST): UTC+2 (CEST)
- Climate: Cfb

Vedum is a locality situated in Vara Municipality, Västra Götaland County, Sweden with 926 inhabitants in 2010.

The company Vedum Kök och Bad AB, a manufacturer of kitchen and bathroom appliances, is located in Vedum.

The locality grew up around a station on the railway line Herrljunga - Uddevalla, which was opened in 1866. The originally narrow gauge railway was rebuilt to standard gauge in 1899-1900 and trains still call at Vedum. The station building played an important part in the film comedy "Stinsen brinner" (The Station Master is on Fire) from 1991.
