= Kinnekulle Line =

Railway line in Sweden

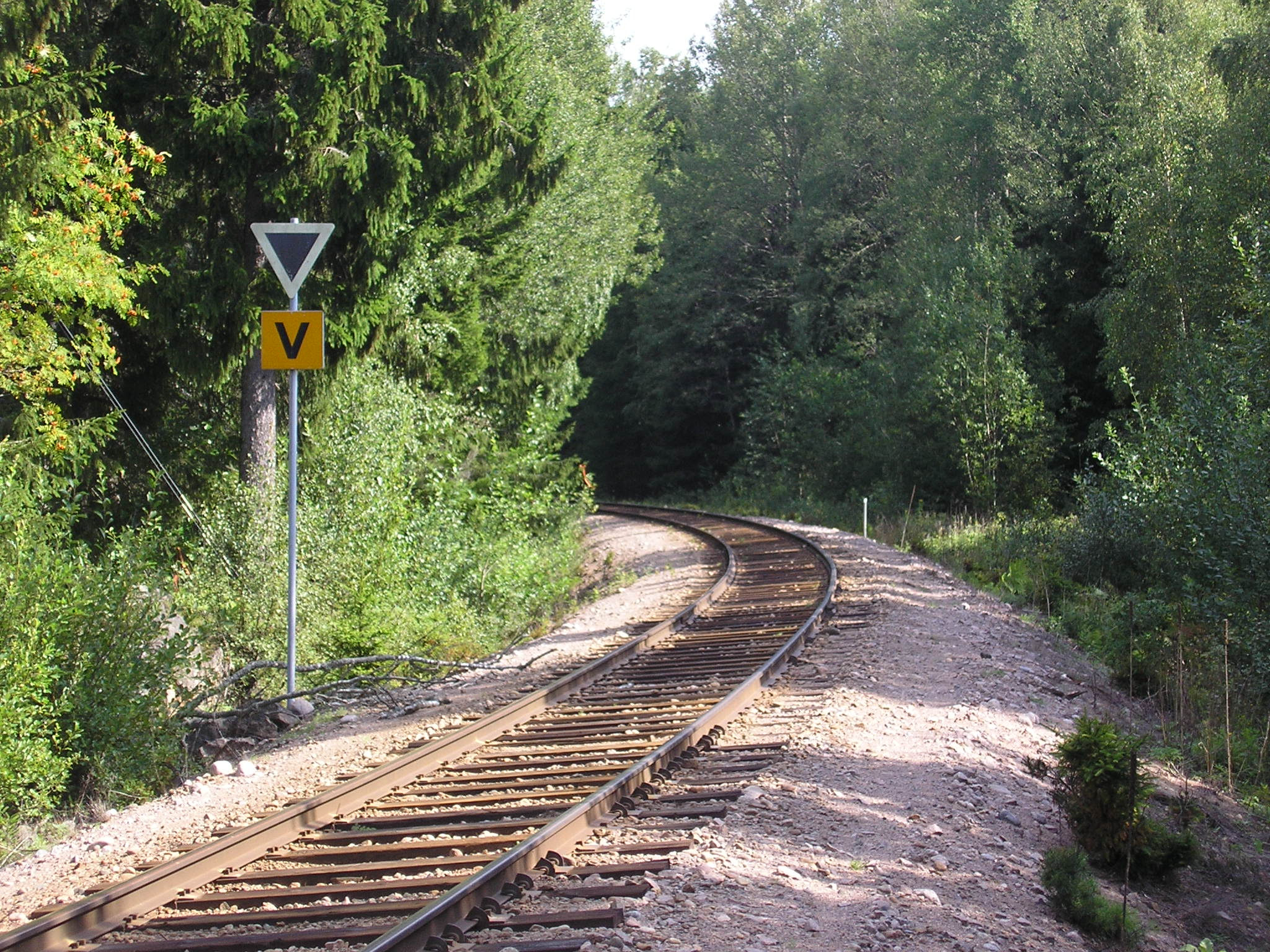
- Kinnekulle Line

Overview
- Status: Operational
- Locale: Västra Götaland County
- Termini: Gårdsjö; Håkantorp

Service
- Type: Regional Rail
- Operator(s): Swedish Transport Administration

History
- Opened: 1877

Technical
- Line length: 121 kilometres (75 mi)
- Number of tracks: One
- Track gauge: 1,435 mm (4 ft 8 1/2 in) standard gauge
- Electrification: No
- Operating speed: 100 km/h (62 mph)

Kinnekulle Line (Swedish: Kinnekullebanan) is a 121-kilometer (75 mi) long unelectrified single track railway line from Håkantorp via Lidköping and Mariestad to Gårdsjö in Sweden. At Gårdsjö, it connects to the Western Main Line and at Håkantorp it connects with the Älvsborg Line. The line lacks both automatic train protection and centralized traffic control. Västtrafik runs a regional trains service on the whole line, using Y31 trains. Green Cargo run trains from Hallsberg to a paper mill in Mariestad.
