= IPSC Swedish Handgun Championship =

Swedish sport shooting competition

The IPSC Swedish Handgun Championship is an IPSC level 3 championship held once a year by the Swedish Dynamic Sports Shooting Association.

== Champions ==
The following is a list of current and previous champions.

=== Overall category ===
Year	Division	Gold	Silver	Bronze	Venue
1980		(Sweden) Lars Pålsson	(Sweden) Jimmie Isaksson	(Sweden) Janne Gregnert	Uppsala
1981		(Sweden) Curt Lundberg	(Sweden) Lars Pålsson	(Sweden) Gerh Nordenström	Gothenburg
1982		(Sweden) Göran Wallström	(Sweden) Lars Pålsson	(Sweden) Curt Lundberg	Karlstad
1983		(Sweden) Hans "Putte" Särén	(Sweden) Janne Gregnert	(Sweden) Göran Wallström	Alingsås
1984		(Sweden) Lars Pålsson	(Sweden) Göran Wallström	(Sweden) Torsten Werner	Örebro
1985		(Sweden) Hans "Putte" Särén	(Sweden) Janne Gregnert	(Sweden) Tommy Östlin	Uppsala
1986		(Sweden) Janne Gregnert	(Sweden) Hans "Putte" Särén	(Sweden) Stefan Österlind	Gothenburg
1987		(Sweden) Hans "Putte" Särén	(Sweden) Janne Gregnert	(Sweden) Stefan Österlind	Karlstad
1988		(Sweden) Allan Björlin	(Sweden) Curt Lundberg	(Sweden) Hans "Putte" Särén	Lund
1989		(Sweden) Tommy Östlin	(Sweden) Allan Björlin	(Sweden) Hans "Putte" Särén	Uppsala
1990		(Sweden) Hans "Putte" Särén	(Sweden) Tommy Östlin	(Sweden) Björn Smedman	Katrineholm
1991		(Sweden) Johan Hansen	(Sweden) Björn Smedman	(Sweden) Leif Madsen	Myttinge shooting range, Stockholm
1992		(Sweden) Johan Hansen	(Sweden) Björn Smedman	(Sweden) Leif Madsen	Gävle
1993	Open	(Sweden) Johan Hansen	(Sweden) Leif Madsen	(Sweden) Stefan Ekstedt	Malmö
1993	Standard	(Sweden) Jörgen Björk	(Sweden) Fredrik Regin	(Sweden) Stefan Karlsson	Malmö
1994	Open	(Sweden) Leif Madsen	(Sweden) Jörgen Björk	(Sweden) Björn Smedman	Gothenburg
1994	Standard	(Sweden) Tord Andersson	(Sweden) Niclas Dal	(Sweden) Fredrik Regin	Gothenburg
1995	Open	(Sweden) Johan Hansen	(Sweden) Stanley Andersson	(Sweden) Björn Smedman	Gävle
1995	Standard	(Sweden) Leif Madsen	(Sweden) Niklas Magnusson	(Sweden) Niclas Dal	Gävle
1996	Open	(Sweden) Johan Hansen	(Sweden) Magnus Johansson	(Sweden) Jörgen Björk	Eksjö
1996	Standard	(Sweden) Leif Madsen	(Sweden) Niclas Dal	(Sweden) Niklas Magnusson	Eksjö
1997	Open	(Sweden) Johan Hansen	(Sweden) Magnus Johansson	(Sweden) Dan Liljeström	Storsjödraget III/Swedish Nationals, Östersund
1997	Standard	(Sweden) Leif Madsen	(Sweden) Jörgen Björk	(Sweden) Robert Söderström	Storsjödraget III/Swedish Nationals, Östersund
1998	Open	(Sweden) Magnus Johansson	(Sweden) Johan Ekegren	(Sweden) Johan Hansen	Swedish Open National Championship, Gothenburg
1998	Standard	(Sweden) Jörgen Björk	(Sweden) Niclas Dal	(Sweden) Robert Söderström	Swedish Open National Championship, Gothenburg
1999	Open	(Sweden) Johan Hansen	(Sweden) Rolf Lönn	(Sweden) Jimi Landin	Swedish Championship, Kungsängen, Stockholm
1999	Standard	(Sweden) Robert Söderström	(Sweden) Dan Liljeström	(Sweden) Jörgen Björk	Swedish Championship, Kungsängen, Stockholm
2000	Modified	(Sweden) Lars Lindstedt	(Sweden) Lars-Tony Skoog	(Sweden) Bertil Haglund	Storsjödraget, Östersund
2000	Revolver	(Sweden) Ivar Edfelt	(Sweden) Bo Edin	(Sweden) Tarmo Kopakka	Storsjödraget, Östersund
2000	Open	(Sweden) Johan Hansen	(Sweden) Johan Nordberg	(Sweden) Johan Ekegren	Swedish Championships, Norrköping
2000	Standard	(Sweden) Robert Söderström	(Sweden) Lars-Tony Skoog	(Sweden) Dan Liljeström	Swedish Championships, Norrköping
2001	Open	(Sweden) Johan Hansen	(Sweden) Johan Nordberg	(Sweden) Faj Tran	Swedish Championship, Uppsala
2001	Production	(Sweden) Jörgen Andersson	(Sweden) Henrik Blixt	(Sweden) Johan Lindbom	Swedish Championship, Uppsala
2001	Revolver	(Sweden) Ivar Edfelt	(Sweden) Bo Edin	(Sweden) Leif Hagberg	Swedish Championship, Uppsala
2001	Standard	(Sweden) Robert Söderström	(Sweden) Lars-Tony Skoog	(Sweden) Predo Kolarevic	Swedish Championship, Uppsala
2002	Open	(Sweden) Johan Hansen	(Sweden) Johan Nordberg	(Sweden) Johan Ekengren	Swedish Open Championship 2002, Uppsala
2002	Production	(Sweden) Stefan Johannesson	(Sweden) Jörgen Andersson	(Sweden) Mikael Olsson	Swedish Open Championship 2002, Uppsala
2002	Revolver	(Sweden) Ivar Edfelt	(Sweden) Klas Lundberg	(Sweden) Bo Edin	Swedish Open Championship 2002, Uppsala
2002	Standard	(Sweden) Robert Söderström	(Sweden) Jörgen Björk	(Sweden) Per Henriksson	Swedish Open Championship 2002, Uppsala
2003	Modified	(Sweden) Mikael Johansson	(Sweden) Torkel Persson	(Sweden) Johnny Nilsson	Swedish International I, Gothenburg
2003	Open	(Sweden) Johan Nordberg	(Sweden) Johan Hansen	(Sweden) Hans "Putte" Särén	Swedish International I, Gothenburg
2003	Production	(Sweden) Per Henriksson	(Sweden) Jörgen Andersson	(Sweden) Lars Lindstedt	Swedish International I, Gothenburg
2003	Revolver	(Sweden) Klas Lundberg	(Sweden) Henrik Blixt	(Sweden) Tarmo Kopakka	Swedish International II, Gothenburg
2003	Standard	(Sweden) Robert Andersson	(Sweden) Johan Hansen	(Sweden) Per Henriksson	Swedish International II, Gothenburg
2004	Open	(Sweden) Johan Nordberg	(Sweden) Johan Hansen	(Sweden) Faj Tran	Swedish Championship, Stockholm
2004	Production	(Sweden) Dan Liljeström	(Sweden) Jörgen Andersson	(Sweden) Stefan Ekstedt	Swedish Championship, Stockholm
2004	Revolver	(Sweden) Klas Lundberg	(Sweden) Hans Andersson	(Sweden) Anders Tjärnström	Swedish Championship, Stockholm
2004	Standard	(Sweden) Robert Andersson	(Sweden) Predo Kolarevic	(Sweden) Lars-Tony Skoog	Swedish Championship, Stockholm
2005	Open	(Sweden) Johan Hansen	(Sweden) Johan Nordberg	(Sweden) Hans "Putte" Särén	Swedish Open Championship 2005, Karlstad
2005	Production	(Sweden) Jörgen Andersson	(Sweden) Per Henriksson	(Sweden) Peter Hladisch	Swedish Open Championship 2005, Karlstad
2005	Revolver	(Sweden) Klas Lundberg	(Sweden) Anders Tjärnström	(Sweden) Bo Edin	Swedish Open Championship 2005, Karlstad
2005	Standard	(Sweden) Lars-Tony Skoog	(Sweden) Lars Lindstedt	(Sweden) Niclas Holmqvist	Swedish Open Championship 2005, Karlstad
2006	Open	(Sweden) Lars-Tony Skoog	(Sweden) Johan Nordberg	(Sweden) Johan Hansen	Sandaknallen, Årjäng
2006	Production	(Sweden) Dan Liljeström	(Sweden) Jörgen Andersson	(Sweden) Per Henriksson	Sandaknallen, Årjäng
2006	Revolver	(Sweden) Ivar Edfelt	-	-	Sandaknallen, Årjäng
2006	Standard	(Sweden) Robert Andersson	(Sweden) Niclas Holmqvist	(Sweden) Klas Lundberg	Sandaknallen, Årjäng
2007	Open	(Sweden) Lars-Tony Skoog	(Sweden) Johan Nordberg	(Sweden) Johan Hansen	Swedish Open Championship, Gothenburg
2007	Production	(Sweden) Dan Liljeström	(Sweden) Stefan Ekstedt	(Sweden) Jörgen Björk	Swedish Open Championship, Gothenburg
2007	Revolver	(Sweden) Ivar Edfelt	(Sweden) Patrik Selinder	(Sweden) Per Bergfeldt	Swedish Open Championship, Gothenburg
2007	Standard	(Sweden) Robert Andersson	(Sweden) Kim Nilsson	(Sweden) Fredrik Wildemo	Swedish Open Championship, Gothenburg
2008	Open	(Sweden) Johan Nordberg	(Sweden) Johan Hansen	(Sweden) Faj Tran	Sandaknallen, Årjäng
2008	Production	(Sweden) Stefan Ekstedt	(Sweden) Jörgen Andersson	(Sweden) Per-Ola Rasmussen	Sandaknallen, Årjäng
2008	Revolver	(Sweden) Ivar Edfelt	(Sweden) Per Bergfeldt	(Sweden) Patrik Selinder	Sandaknallen, Årjäng
2008	Standard	(Sweden) Fredrik Wildemo	(Sweden) Mats O. Bäckström	(Sweden) Robert Andersson	Sandaknallen, Årjäng
2009	Open	(Sweden) Lars-Tony Skoog	(Sweden) Johan Nordberg	(Sweden) Robert Saltin	Swedish Championship 2009, Malmö
2009	Production	(Sweden) Per-Ola Rasmussen	(Sweden) Faj Tran	(Sweden) Fredrik Wildemo	Swedish Championship 2009, Malmö
2009	Revolver	(Sweden) Olle Lindskog	(Sweden) Per Bergfeldt	(Sweden) Anders Wennerbom	Swedish Championship 2009, Malmö
2009	Standard	(Sweden) Robert Andersson	(Sweden) Mats O. Bäckström	(Sweden) Sven Lundberg	Swedish Championship 2009, Malmö
2010	Open	(Sweden) Johan Hansen	(Sweden) Johan Nordberg	(Sweden) Lars-Tony Skoog	Cops Cup XVIII, Gothenburg
2010	Production	(Sweden) Rasmus Gyllenberg	(Sweden) Stefan Ekstedt	(Sweden) Jörgen Björk	Cops Cup XVIII, Gothenburg
2010	Revolver	(Sweden) Per Bergfeldt	(Sweden) Olle Lindskog	(Sweden) Anders Lindfors	Cops Cup XVIII, Gothenburg
2010	Standard	(Sweden) Robert Andersson	(Sweden) Peter Kastell	(Sweden) Dan Liljeström	Cops Cup XVIII, Gothenburg
2011	Open	(Sweden) Lars-Tony Skoog	(Sweden) Johan Hansen	(Sweden) Johan Nordberg	Eskilstuna Open, Eskilstuna
2011	Standard	(Sweden) Robert Andersson	(Sweden) Peter Kastell	(Sweden) Dan Liljeström	Eskilstuna Open, Eskilstuna
2011	Production	(Sweden) Faj Tran	(Sweden) Stefan Ekstedt	(Sweden) Fredrik Ekstrand	Eskilstuna Open, Eskilstuna
2011	Revolver	(Sweden) Per Bergfeldt	(Sweden) Olle Lindskog	(Sweden) Jonas Björk	Eskilstuna Open, Eskilstuna
2012	Classic	(Sweden) Robert Saltin	(Sweden) Magnus Appelkvist	(Sweden) Håkan T Söderholm	Cops Cup XX, Gothenburg
2012	Open	(Sweden) Johan Nordberg	(Sweden) Johan Hansen	(Sweden) Lars-Tony Skoog	Cops Cup XX, Gothenburg
2012	Production	(Sweden) Rasmus Gyllenberg	(Sweden) Per-Ola Rasmussen	(Sweden) Magnus Johansson	Cops Cup XX, Gothenburg
2012	Revolver	(Sweden) Jonas Björk	(Sweden) Anders Lindfors	(Sweden) Ivar Edfelt	Cops Cup XX, Gothenburg
2012	Standard	(Sweden) Robert Andersson	(Sweden) Mats O. Bäckström	(Sweden) Mikael Östling	Cops Cup XX, Gothenburg
2013	Classic	(Sweden) Lars-Tony Skoog	(Sweden) Faj Tran	(Sweden) Robert Söderström	C4 Open, Kristianstad
2013	Production	(Sweden) Magnus Johansson	(Sweden) Rasmus Gyllenberg	(Sweden) Peter Kastell	C4 Open, Kristianstad
2013	Revolver	(Sweden) Olle Lindskog	(Sweden) Jonas Björk	(Sweden) Kalle Halvarsson	C4 Open, Kristianstad
2013	Open	(Sweden) Lars-Tony Skoog	(Sweden) Johan Nordberg	(Sweden) Johan Hansen	Swedish Championship - Open & Standard, Malmö
2013	Standard	(Sweden) Rasmus Gyllenberg	(Sweden) Magnus Johansson	(Sweden) Mikael Östling	Swedish Championship - Open & Standard, Malmö
2014	Classic	(Sweden) Robert Söderström	(Sweden) Pär Hylander	(Sweden) Faj Tran	C4 Open 2, Kristianstad
2014	Revolver	(Sweden) Kalle Halvarsson	(Sweden) Per Bergfeldt	(Sweden) Anders Lindfors	C4 Open 2, Kristianstad
2014	Standard	(Sweden) Magnus Johansson	(Sweden) Lars-Tony Skoog	(Sweden) Mats O. Bäckström	C4 Open 2, Kristianstad
2014	Open	(Sweden) Johan Hansen	(Sweden) Johan Nordberg	(Sweden) Lars-Tony Skoog	West Coast Challenge 2014, Gothenburg
2014	Production	(Sweden) Magnus Johansson	(Sweden) Johan Modigh	(Sweden) Robert Söderström	Gothenburg Open 2014, Gothenburg
2015	Classic	(Sweden) Robert Söderström	(Sweden) Peter Kastell	(Sweden) Faj Tran	West Coast Challenge 2015, Gothenburg
2015	Revolver	(Sweden) Kalle Halvarsson	(Sweden) Jonas Björk	(Sweden) Olle Lindskog	West Coast Challenge 2015, Gothenburg
2015	Open	(Sweden) Lars-Tony Skoog	(Sweden) Johan Nordberg	(Sweden) Bjarne Larning	Malmö Handgun Championships 2015, Malmö
2015	Production	(Sweden) Johan Modigh	(Sweden) Rasmus Gyllenberg	(Sweden) Magnus Johansson	Gothenburg Open 2015, Gothenburg
2015	Standard	(Sweden) Dan Liljeström	(Sweden) Lars-Tony Skoog	(Sweden) Magnus Johansson	Stockholm IPSC Open, Stockholm
2016	Classic	(Sweden) Peter Kastell	(Sweden) Lars-Tony Skoog	(Sweden) Faj Tran	Malmö Handgun Championships 2016, Malmö
2016	Production	(Sweden) Rasmus Gyllenberg	(Sweden) Magnus Johansson	(Sweden) Robert Söderström	Malmö Handgun Championships 2016, Malmö
2016	Revolver	(Sweden) Jonas Björk	(Sweden) Kalle Halvarsson	(Sweden) Lars-Olof Halvarsson	Malmö Handgun Championships 2016, Malmö
2016	Open	(Sweden) Joakim Wallin	(Sweden) Lars-Tony Skoog	(Sweden) Johan Nordberg	Stockholm IPSC Open II, Stockholm
2016	Standard	(Sweden) Magnus Johansson	(Sweden) Johan Modigh	(Sweden) Peter Kastell	Cops Cup/Gothenburg Open 2016, Gothenburg
2017	Classic	(Sweden) Lars-Tony Skoog	(Sweden) Robert Andersson	(Sweden) Kent Stangvik	Svenska Mästerskapen 2017, Östersund
2017	Production	(Sweden) Johan Modigh	(Sweden) Rasmus Gyllenberg	(Sweden) Robert Söderström	Svenska Mästerskapen 2017, Östersund
2017	Revolver	(Sweden) Lars-Olof Halvarsson	(Sweden) Olle Lindskog	(Sweden) Jonas Björk	Svenska Mästerskapen 2017, Östersund
2017	Open	(Sweden) Lars-Tony Skoog	(Sweden) Erik Stjernlöf	(Sweden) Johan Nordberg	Cops Cup/Gothenburg Open 2017, Gothenburg
2017	Standard	(Sweden) Rasmus Gyllenberg	(Sweden) Magnus Johansson	(Sweden) Peter Kastell	Cops Cup/Gothenburg Open 2017, Gothenburg
2018	Classic	(Sweden) Faj Tran	(Sweden) Lars-Tony Skoog	(Sweden) Pär Hylander	Mälarslaget, 30 June - 1 July Eskilstuna and Västerås
2018	Production	(Sweden) Ted Åhlenius	(Sweden) Rasmus Gyllenberg	(Sweden) Magnus Johansson	Mälarslaget, 30 June - 1 July Eskilstuna and Västerås
2018	Revolver	(Sweden) Jonas Björk	(Sweden) Olle Lindskog	(Sweden) Isak Essebro	Mälarslaget, 30 June - 1 July Eskilstuna and Västerås
2018	Open	(Sweden) Erik Stjernlöf	(Sweden) Johan Nordberg	(Sweden) Lars-Tony Skoog	Great Lake Open, 21–22 July, Östersund
2018	Standard	(Sweden) Rasmus Gyllenberg	(Sweden) Ted Åhlenius	(Sweden) Fredrik Jacobsson	Great Lake Open, 21–22 July, Östersund
2019	Classic	(Sweden) Kalle Halvarsson	(Sweden) Faj Tran	(Sweden) Jonas Björk	Mälarslaget, 6–7 June Eskilstuna and Västerås
2019	Production	(Sweden) Rasmus Gyllenberg	(Sweden) Ted Åhlenius	(Sweden) Magnus Johansson	Mälarslaget, 6–7 June Eskilstuna and Västerås
2019	Revolver	(Sweden) Olle Lindskog	(Sweden) Eddie Karlsson	(Sweden) Mats Salomonsson	Mälarslaget, 6–7 June Eskilstuna and Västerås
2019	Open	(Sweden) Erik Stjernlöf	(Sweden) Lars-Tony Skoog	(Sweden) Peter Kastell	Oden Cup, Uppsala
2019	Standard	(Sweden) Mikael Jung	(Sweden) Ted Åhlenius	(Sweden) Dan Liljeström	Oden Cup, Uppsala
2021	Classic	(Sweden) Jonas Björk	(Sweden) Per Hylander	(Sweden) Martin Håkansson	Oden Cup, 18–19 September, Uppsala
2021	Production	(Sweden) Rasmus Gyllenberg	(Sweden) Robert Börjesson	(Sweden) Gabriel Lind	Oden Cup, 18–19 September, Uppsala
2021	Production Optics	(Sweden) Erik Stjernlöf	(Sweden) Lars-Tony Skoog	(Sweden) Johan Hansen	Oden Cup, 18–19 September, Uppsala
2021	Revolver	(Sweden) Mats Salomonsson	(Sweden) Per Bergfeldt	(Sweden) Eddie Karlsson	Oden Cup, 18–19 September, Uppsala
2022	Classic	(Sweden) Per Hylander	(Sweden) Faj Tran	(Sweden) Jonas Björk	Malmö Handgun Championship, 23–24 July, Malmö
2022	Production	(Sweden) Rasmus Gyllenberg	(Sweden) Gabriel Lind	(Sweden) Robert Börjesson	Malmö Handgun Championship, 23–24 July, Malmö
2022	Production Optics	(Sweden) Ted Åhlenius	(Sweden) Lars-Tony Skoog	(Sweden) David Levin	Malmö Handgun Championship, 23–24 July, Malmö
2022	Open	(Sweden) Erik Stjernlöf	(Sweden) Peter Kastell	(Sweden) Johan Nordberg	Malmö Handgun Championship, 23–24 July, Malmö
2022	Standard	(Sweden) Mats Bäckström	(Sweden) Johan Skogh	(Sweden) Peter Eliasson	Malmö Handgun Championship, 23–24 July, Malmö
2023	Classic	(Sweden) Mats Håkansson	(Sweden) Jonas Björk	(Sweden) Jerry Pettersson	Malmö Handgun Championship, 22–23 July, Malmö
2023	Production	(Sweden) Daniel Johnson	(Sweden) Gabriel Lind	(Sweden) Vincent Hörnsten	Malmö Handgun Championship, 22–23 July, Malmö
2023	Production Optics	(Sweden) Ted Åhlenius	(Sweden) Rasmus Gyllenberg	(Sweden) Mikael Östling	Malmö Handgun Championship, 22–23 July, Malmö
2023	Open	(Sweden) Erik Stjernlöf	(Sweden) Hugo Rinaldo	(Sweden) Peter Kastell	Malmö Handgun Championship, 22–23 July, Malmö
2023	Standard	(Sweden) Mats Bäckström	(Sweden) Jonas Forslund	(Sweden) Nicola Lo Presti	Malmö Handgun Championship, 22–23 July, Malmö
2023	Revolver	(Sweden) Per Bergfeldt	(Sweden) Mats Salomonsson	(Sweden) Eddie Karlsson	Malmö Handgun Championship, 22–23 July, Malmö
2024	Classic	(Sweden) Jerry Pettersson	(Sweden) Kalle Halvarsson	(Sweden) Jonas Björk	Malmö Handgun Championship, 29-30 juni, Malmö
2024	Production	(Sweden) Daniel Johnson	(Sweden) Vincent Hörnsten	(Sweden) Martin Assarsson	Malmö Handgun Championship, 29-30 juni, Malmö
2024	Production Optics	(Sweden) Rasmus Gyllenberg	(Sweden) David Levin	(Sweden) Mikael Östling	Malmö Handgun Championship, 29-30 juni, Malmö
2024	Open	(Sweden) Erik Stjernlöf	(Sweden) Hugo Rinaldo	(Sweden) Peter Kastell	Malmö Handgun Championship, 29-30 juni, Malmö
2024	Standard	(Sweden) Mats Bäckström	(Sweden) Jonas Forslund	(Sweden) Anders Långberg	Malmö Handgun Championship, 29-30 juni, Malmö
2024	Revolver	(Sweden) Markus Thorstensson	(Sweden) Ali Adel	(Sweden) Tarmo Kopakka	Malmö Handgun Championship, 29-30 juni, Malmö
2025	Classic	(Sweden) Jerry Pettersson	(Sweden) Jonas Björk	(Sweden) Fredrik Sunnermark	Bulletstorm 4, Ludvika
2025	Production	(Sweden) Martin Assarsson	(Sweden) Daniel Johnson	(Sweden) Ricardo Soler	Bulletstorm 4, Ludvika
2025	Production Optics	(Sweden) David Levin	(Sweden) Rasmus Gyllenberg	(Sweden) Mikael Östling	Bulletstorm 4, Ludvika
2025	Standard	(Sweden) Pär Hylander	(Sweden) Simon Fant	(Sweden) Jonas Forslund	Bulletstorm 4, Ludvika
2025	Open	(Sweden) Erik Stjernlöf	(Sweden) Albin Hylander	(Sweden) Frans Vonasek	Bulletstorm 4, Ludvika
2025	Revolver	(Sweden) Markus Thorstensson	(Sweden) Isak Essebro	(Sweden) Anders Jansson	Bulletstorm 4, Ludvika

=== Lady category ===
Year	Division	Gold	Silver	Bronze	Venue
2001	Open		(Sweden) Therese Lindström		Swedish Championship, Uppsala
2010	Production	(Sweden) Tina Oskarsson	(Sweden) Åsa Andersson	(Sweden) Sofia Dohmen	Cops Cup XVIII, Gothenburg
2011	Production	(Sweden) Marianne Schön	(Sweden) Tina Oskarsson	(Sweden) Sabine Olovsson Andersson	Eskilstuna Open, Eskilstuna
2012	Production	(Sweden) Marianne Schön	(Sweden) Tina Oskarsson	(Sweden) Yvonne Berg	Cops Cup XX, Gothenburg
2013	Production	(Sweden) Marianne Hansen	(Sweden) Tina Oskarsson	(Sweden) Madelen Berg	C4 Open, Kristianstad
2013	Standard	(Sweden) Marianne Hansen	(Sweden) Tina Oskarsson	(Sweden) Ann Harding	Swedish Championship - Open & Standard, Malmö
2014	Production	(Sweden) Tina Oskarsson	(Sweden) Ann Harding	(Sweden) Madelen Berg	Gothenburg Open 2014, Gothenburg
2014	Standard	(Sweden) Tina Oskarsson	(Sweden) Madelen Berg	(Sweden) Thette Holmberg	C4 Open 2, Kristianstad
2015	Production	(Sweden) Tina Oskarsson	(Sweden) Marianne Hansen	(Sweden) Cecilia Lindberg	Gothenburg Open 2015, Gothenburg
2015	Standard	(Sweden) Marianne Hansen	(Sweden) Tina Oskarsson	(Sweden) Madelen Berg	Stockholm IPSC Open, Stockholm
2016	Production	(Sweden) Cecilia Lindberg	(Sweden) Tina Oskarsson	(Sweden) Marianne Hansen	Malmö Handgun Championships 2016, Malmö
2016	Standard	(Sweden) Cecilia Lindberg	(Sweden) Marianne Hansen	(Sweden) Tina Oskarsson	Cops Cup/Gothenburg Open 2016, Gothenburg
2017	Production	(Sweden) Marianne Hansen	(Sweden) Madelen Berg	(Sweden) Karin Wiklund	Svenska Mästerskapen 2017, Östersund
2017	Standard	(Sweden) Cecilia Lindberg	(Sweden) Tina Oskarsson	(Sweden) Madelen Berg	Cops Cup/Gothenburg Open 2017, Gothenburg
2018	Production	(Sweden) Cecilia Lindberg	(Sweden) Anna Utter	(Sweden) Madelen Berg	Mälarslaget, Eskilstuna-Västerås
2019	Open	(Sweden) Karin Wiklund	(Sweden) Marianne Hansen	(Sweden) Carolina Atikainen	Oden Cup, Uppsala
2019	Standard	(Sweden) Cecilia Lindberg	(Sweden) Sandra Arbinger	(Sweden) Edith Gustavsson	Oden Cup, Uppsala
2021	Production	(Sweden) Cecilia Lindberg	(Sweden) Sandra Arbinger	(Sweden) Johanna Andersson	Oden Cup, Uppsala
2021	Production Optics	(Sweden) Marianne Hansen	(Sweden) Susanne Pejle	(Sweden) Linda Påhlman	Oden Cup, Uppsala
2022	Standard	(Sweden) Pia Nordquist	(Sweden) Angelica Sanchez	(Sweden) Marlene Lund Kopparklint	Malmö Handgun Championship
2022	Production	(Sweden) Sandra Arbinger	(Sweden) Lilly Westberg	(Sweden) Izabell Pilsten	Malmö Handgun Championship
2022	Production Optics	(Sweden) Cecilia Lindberg	(Sweden) Marianne Schön	(Sweden) Sussane Pejle	Malmö Handgun Championship
2023	Production	(Sweden) Lilly Westberg	(Sweden) Izabell Pilsten	(Sweden) Cecilia Eronen	Malmö Handgun Championship
2023	Production Optics	(Sweden) Cecilia Lindberg	(Sweden) Merima Åström	(Sweden) Marianne Schön	Malmö Handgun Championship
2024	Production	(Sweden) Alexandra Shamloo	(Sweden) Pia Lepistö	(Sweden) Izabell Pilsten	Malmö Handgun Championship
2024	Standard	(Sweden) Sandra Arbinger	(Sweden) Angelica Sanchez	(Sweden) Teres Gustavsson	Malmö Handgun Championship
2024	Production Optics	(Sweden) Cecilia Lindberg	(Sweden) Merima Åström	(Sweden) Marianne Schön	Malmö Handgun Championship
2025	Production	(Sweden) Alexandra Shamloo	(Sweden) Maria Assenhöj	(Sweden) Pia Lepistö	Bulletstorm 4, Ludvika
2025	Production Optics	(Sweden) Cecilia Lindberg	(Sweden) Merima Åström	(Sweden) Ida Rinaldo	Bulletstorm 4, Ludvika

=== Junior category ===
Year	Division	Gold	Silver	Bronze	Venue
2017	Production	(Sweden) Otto Karlsson	(Sweden) William Parhammar	-	Svenska Mästerskapen 2017, Östersund
2021	Production	(Sweden) Albin Hylander	(Sweden) William Parhammar	(Sweden) Otto Karlsson	Svenska Mästerskapen 2021, Uppsala
2022	Production Optics	(Sweden) Hugo Rinaldo	(Sweden) Magnus Krohn	(Sweden) Albin Hylander	Svenska Mästerskapet 2022, Malmö

=== Senior category ===
Year	Division	Gold	Silver	Bronze	Venue
2000	Open	(Sweden) Hans "Putte" Sären	(Sweden) Tommy Östlin	(Sweden) Peter Gustavsson	Swedish Championships, Norrköping
2000	Standard	(Sweden) Jan Holmgren	(Sweden) Curt Wange	(Sweden) Jimmie Isaksson	Swedish Championships, Norrköping
2001	Open	(Sweden) Rolf Lönn	(Sweden) Tommy Östlin	(Sweden) Hans "Putte" Sären	Swedish Championship, Uppsala
2001	Standard	(Sweden) Torbjörn Tomtlund	(Sweden) Lennart Adelvik	(Sweden) Janne Gregnert	Swedish Championship, Uppsala
2002	Open	(Sweden) Rolf Lönn	(Sweden) Hans "Putte" Sären	(Sweden) Tommy Östlin	Swedish Open Championship 2002, Uppsala
2002	Standard	(Sweden) Torbjörn Tomtlund	(Sweden) Janne Gregnert	(Sweden) Lennart Adelvik	Swedish Open Championship 2002, Uppsala
2003	Open	(Sweden) Hans "Putte" Särén	(Sweden) Curt Wange	(Sweden) Olle Janson	Swedish International I, Gothenburg
2003	Standard	(Sweden) Johnny Nilsson	(Sweden) Rolf Lönn	(Sweden) Jan Gregnert	Swedish International II, Gothenburg
2004	Standard	(Sweden) Johnny Nilsson	(Sweden) Janne Gregnert	(Sweden) Lennart Adelvik	Swedish Championship, Stockholm
2005	Open	(Sweden) Hans "Putte" Särén	(Sweden) Rolf Lönn	(Sweden) Claes Jernberg	Swedish Open Championship 2005, Karlstad
2005	Standard	(Sweden) Johnny Nilsson	(Sweden) Fredrik Johansson	(Sweden) Hans-Erik Sjöholm	Swedish Open Championship 2005, Karlstad
2006	Open	(Sweden) Hans "Putte" Särén	(Sweden) Rolf Lönn	(Sweden) Claes Jernberg	Sandaknallen, Årjäng
2007	Open	(Sweden) Rolf Lönn	(Sweden) Hans "Putte" Särén	(Sweden) Claes Jernberg	Swedish Open Championship, Gothenburg
2010	Production	(Sweden) Stefan Johannesson	(Sweden) Tomas Hermander	(Sweden) Lars Jönsson	Cops Cup XVIII, Gothenburg
2011	Standard	(Sweden) Lars Lindstedt	(Sweden) Bo Edin	(Sweden) Roger Tiensuu	Eskilstuna Open, Eskilstuna
2012	Open	(Sweden) Rolf Lönn	(Sweden) Carl-Erik Werner	(Sweden) Tony Forslund	Cops Cup XX, Gothenburg
2012	Standard	(Sweden) Lars Lindstedt	(Sweden) Thomas Ekstrand	(Sweden) Jan Skånberg	Cops Cup XX, Gothenburg
2013	Classic	(Sweden) Lars-Åke Ingemarsson	(Sweden) Weine Samuelsson	(Sweden) Stefan Grahn	C4 Open, Kristianstad
2013	Production	(Sweden) Stefan Ekstedt	(Sweden) Stefan Johannesson	(Sweden) Dan Andersson	C4 Open, Kristianstad
2013	Standard	(Sweden) Lars Lindstedt	(Sweden) Stefan Johannesson	(Sweden) Leif Gliving	Swedish Championship - Open & Standard, Malmö
2014	Classic	(Sweden) Bo Edin	(Sweden) Lars-Åke Ingemarsson	(Sweden) Weine Samuelsson	C4 Open 2, Kristianstad
2014	Standard	(Sweden) Lars Lindstedt	(Sweden) Peter Svedberg	(Sweden) Dan Andersson	C4 Open 2, Kristianstad
2014	Open	(Sweden) Johan Hansen	(Sweden) Magnus Von Brömsen	(Sweden) Tony Forslund	West Coast Challenge 2014, Gothenburg
2014	Production	(Sweden) Stefan Ekstedt	(Sweden) Stefan Johannesson	(Sweden) Peter Svedberg	Gothenburg Open 2014, Gothenburg
2015	Classic	(Sweden) Lars Lindstedt	(Sweden) Lars-Åke Ingemarsson	(Sweden) Weine Samuelsson	West Coast Challenge 2015, Gothenburg
2015	Production	(Sweden) Stefan Ekstedt	(Sweden) Stefan Johannesson	(Sweden) Peter Svedberg	Gothenburg Open 2015, Gothenburg
2015	Open	(Sweden) Jens Sandberg	(Sweden) Magnus Von Brömsen	(Sweden) Göran Majvall	Malmö Handgun Championships 2015, Malmö
2015	Standard	(Sweden) Johan Hansen	(Sweden) Stefan Johannesson	(Sweden) Niclas Dal	Stockholm IPSC Open, Stockholm
2016	Classic	(Sweden) Bengt Bäckström	(Sweden) Lars-Åke Ingemarsson	(Sweden) Lars Lindstedt	Malmö Handgun Championships 2016, Malmö
2016	Production	(Sweden) Peter Svedberg	(Sweden) Niclas Dal	(Sweden) Johan Hansen	Malmö Handgun Championships 2016, Malmö
2016	Revolver	(Sweden) Olle Lindskog	(Sweden) Per Bergfeldt	(Sweden) Roger Tiensuu	Malmö Handgun Championships 2016, Malmö
2016	Open	(Sweden) Johan Hansen	(Sweden) Fredrik Lundbeck	(Sweden) Jens Sandberg	Stockholm IPSC Open II, Stockholm
2016	Standard	(Sweden) Niclas Dal	(Sweden) Johan Hansen	(Sweden) Stefan Johannesson	Cops Cup/Gothenburg Open 2016, Gothenburg
2017	Classic	(Sweden) Kent Stangvik	(Sweden) Bengt Bäckström	(Sweden) Leif Hagberg	Svenska Mästerskapen 2017, Östersund
2017	Production	(Sweden) Patrik Gren	(Sweden) Niclas Dal	(Sweden) Johan Hansen	Svenska Mästerskapen 2017, Östersund
2017	Open	(Sweden) Johan Hansen	(Sweden) Jens Söderlund	(Sweden) Tommy Hjelm	Cops Cup/Gothenburg Open 2017, Gothenburg
2017	Standard	(Sweden) Patrik Gren	(Sweden) Niclas Dal	(Sweden) Jonas Renström	Cops Cup/Gothenburg Open 2017, Gothenburg
2018	Open	(Sweden) Johan Hansen	(Sweden) Jens Söderlund	(Sweden) Jari Kurttio	Great Lake Open, Östersund
2018	Standard	(Sweden) Niclas Dal	(Sweden) Patrik Gren	(Sweden) Peter Svedberg	Great Lake Open, Östersund
2018	Production	(Sweden) Johan Hansen	(Sweden) Niclas Dal	(Sweden) Stefan Johannesson	Mälarslaget, Eskilstuna-Västerås
2019	Open	(Sweden) Johan Hansen	(Sweden) Jens Söderlund	(Sweden) Robert Kunst	Oden Cup, Uppsala
2019	Standard	(Sweden) Dan Liljeström	(Sweden) Kenneth Karlsson	(Sweden) Niclas Dal	Oden Cup, Uppsala
2019	Production	(Sweden) Lars-Olof Halvarsson	(Sweden) Peter Svedberg	(Sweden) Tony Wendelklint	Mälarslaget, Eskilstuna-Västerås
2019	Revolver	(Sweden) Olle Lindskog	(Sweden) Sonny Forsberg	(Sweden) Tarmo Kopakka	Mälarslaget, Eskilstuna-Västerås
2019	Production Optics	(Sweden) Johan Hansen	(Sweden) Stefan Ekstedt	(Sweden) Niclas Dal	Mälarslaget, Eskilstuna-Västerås
2021	Production	(Sweden) Håkan Wiren	(Sweden) Patrik Gren	(Sweden) Erik NN	Oden Cup, Uppsala
2021	Production Optics	(Sweden) Lars-Tony Skoog	(Sweden) Johan Hansen	(Sweden) Niclas Dal	Oden Cup, Uppsala
2021	Revolver	(Sweden) Per Bergfeldt	(Sweden) Sonny Forsberg	(Sweden) Tarmo Kopakka	Oden Cup, Uppsala
2021	Classic	(Sweden) Kenneth Karlsson	(Sweden) Lars Lindstedt	(Sweden) Andreas Kraling	Oden Cup, Uppsala
2022	Open	(Sweden) Johan Hansen	(Sweden) Jari Kurttio	(Sweden) Jens Söderlund	Malmö Handgun Championship
2022	Standard	(Sweden) Mats Bäckström	(Sweden) Patrik NN	(Sweden) Per-Arne Svensson	Malmö Handgun Championship
2022	Production	(Sweden) Håkan Wiren	(Sweden) Patrik Gren	(Sweden) Lars-Olof Halvarsson	Malmö Handgun Championship
2022	Production Optics	(Sweden) Lars-Tony Skoog	(Sweden) Niclas Dal	(Sweden) Jiro Nihei	Malmö Handgun Championship
2022	Classic	(Sweden) Pär Hylander	(Sweden) David Lindhe	(Sweden) Andreas Kraling	Malmö Handgun Championship
2023	Open	(Sweden) Johan Norberg	(Sweden) Pär Hylander	(Sweden) Johan Hansen	Malmö Handgun Championship
2023	Standard	(Sweden) Mats Bäckström	(Sweden) Per-Arne Svensson	(Sweden) Ronny Andreassen	Malmö Handgun Championship
2023	Production	(Sweden) Håkan Wiren	(Sweden) Lars-Olof Halvarsson	(Sweden) David Lindhe	Malmö Handgun Championship
2023	Production Optics	(Sweden) Lars-Tony Skoog	(Sweden) Joakim Wallin	(Sweden) Jiro Nihei	Malmö Handgun Championship
2024	Open	(Sweden) Mathias Rinaldo	(Sweden) Robert Hansson	(Sweden) Jörgen Broman	Malmö Handgun Championship
2024	Standard	(Sweden) Mats Bäckström	(Sweden) Ronny Andreassen	(Sweden) Patrik Fritzson	Malmö Handgun Championship
2024	Production	(Sweden) Patrik Gren	(Sweden) Pär Hylander	(Sweden) Lars-Olof Halvarsson	Malmö Handgun Championship
2024	Production Optics	(Sweden) Lars-Tony Skoog	(Sweden) Niclas Dal	(Sweden) Peter Saltvik	Malmö Handgun Championship
2024	Classic	(Sweden) Fredrik Sunnermark	(Sweden) Patrik Carlsson	(Sweden) Stefan Grahn	Malmö Handgun Championship
2025	Open	(Sweden) Tomas Lindgren	(Sweden) Jari Kurttio	(Sweden) Daniel Persson	Bulletstorm 4, Ludvika
2025	Standard	(Sweden) Pär Hylander	(Sweden) Mats Bäckström	(Sweden) Mats Karlsson	Bulletstorm 4, Ludvika
2025	Production	(Sweden) Robert Söderström	(Sweden) Magnus Abelsson	(Sweden) Fredrik Wildemo	Bulletstorm 4, Ludvika
2025	Production Optics	(Sweden) Jiro Nihei	(Sweden) Marcus Skogström	(Sweden) Patrik Gren	Bulletstorm 4, Ludvika

=== Super Senior category ===
Year	Division	Gold	Silver	Bronze	Venue
2011	Production	(Sweden) Torbjörn Tomtlund	(Sweden) Weine Samuelsson	(Sweden) Hans Ingmansson	Eskilstuna Open, Eskilstuna
2018	Open	(Sweden) Rolf Lönn	(Sweden) Göran Jansson	(Sweden) Olof Sjöden	Mälarslaget, Eskilstuna-Västerås
2019	Open	(Sweden) Göran Jansson	(Sweden) Jan Mattsson	(Sweden) Per Jonasson	Oden Cup, Uppsala
2021	Production Optics	(Sweden) Stefan Johannesson	(Sweden) Rolf Lönn	(Sweden) Conny Chow	Oden Cup, Uppsala
2023	Open	(Sweden) Leif Madsen	(Sweden) Heinz Johansson	(Sweden) Patric Gustavsson	Malmö Handgun Championship
2023	Production Optics	(Sweden) Stefan Johannesson	(Sweden) Mats Parhammar	(Sweden) Bengt Petersson	Malmö Handgun Championship
2024	Open	(Sweden) Heinz Johansson	(Sweden) Patric Gustavsson	(Sweden) Jan Mattsson	Malmö Handgun Championship
2024	Standard	(Sweden) P-A Svensson	(Sweden) Björn Elvin	(Sweden) Jan-Erik Winberg	Malmö Handgun Championship
2024	Production Optics	(Sweden) Johan Hansen	(Sweden) Stefan Johannesson	(Sweden) Kent Stangvik	Malmö Handgun Championship
2025	Open	(Sweden) Heinz Johansson	(Sweden) Bossen Jansson	(Sweden) Jan Mattsson	Bulletstorm 4, Ludvika
2025	Production Optics	(Sweden) Niclas Dal	(Sweden) Stefan Ekstedt	(Sweden) Kent Stangvik	Bulletstorm 4, Ludvika
2026	Open	(Sweden) Johan Hansen	(Sweden) Bosse Jansson	(Sweden) Ronny Bergström	GLO Östersund
2026	Revolver	(Sweden) Per Bergfeldt	(Sweden) Jan Tirfing	(Sweden) Sonny Forsberg	GLO Östersund
2026	Production Optics	(Sweden) Niclas Dal	(Sweden) Peter Hladisch	(Sweden) Peter Retep	GLO Östersund
2026	Production	(Sweden) Peter Svedberg	(Sweden) Gerry Strandberg	(Sweden) Mikael K	GLO Östersund
2026	Optics	(Sweden) Kent Stangvik	(Sweden) Stefan Johannesson	(Sweden) Per-Arne Svensson	GLO Östersund

=== Team category ===
Year	Division	Gold	Silver	Bronze	Venue
2001	Open	Borås PS Faj Tran, Hans Gustafsson, Richard Lindström, Therese Lindström			Swedish Championship, Uppsala
2003	Open	Göteborgs DS Johan Nordberg, Glenn Friberg, Hans "Putte" Särén, Olle Janson	-	-	Swedish International I, Gothenburg
2003	Production	Stockholmspolisens PS Mikael Lindqvist, Marianne Schön, Nils Idemalm, Per Henriksson	Göteborgs Polismäns IF Anders Lycke, Christer Back, Mikael Olsson, Stefan Johanesson	Halmstadspolisens PS Gustav Bengtsson, Kent Landström, Tommy Hjälm	Swedish International I, Gothenburg
2003	Standard	Stockholmspolisens PS #1 Dan Liljeström, Mikael Lindqvist, Per Henriksson, Peter Hladisch	Stockholmspolisens PS #2 Fredrik Wildemo, Johan Hansen, Michael Olander, Torkel Persson	Växjö PS Johan Larsson, Thomas Phil, Mattias Gustavsson	Swedish International II, Gothenburg
2010	Open	Göteborgs DS #1 Johan Nordberg, Joakim Wallin, Peter Larsson, Robert Andersson	Göteborgs DS #2 Tony Forslund, Claes Nilsson, David Ståhl	-	Cops Cup XVIII, Gothenburg
2010	Production	Göteborgs Polismäns IF Rasmus Gyllenberg, Stefan Johannesson, Henrik Berntsson, Christer Back	IPSC Växjö Jörgen Björk, Robert Falk, Tomas Hermander, Adam Odgaard-Nexe	Göteborgs DS Per-Ola Rasmussen, Jörgen Andersson, Robert Gunnarsson, Anders Wennerbom	Cops Cup XVIII, Gothenburg
2010	Standard	Göteborgs DS Robert Andersson, Mikael Östling, Jens Sandberg, Niklas Arabäck	Malmö Skyttegille Robert Saltin, Mats O. Bäckström, Leif Madsen, Daniel Holmberg	IPSC Västerås Klas Lundberg, Sven Lundberg, Hans Andersson, Fredrik Miklaheim	Cops Cup XVIII, Gothenburg
2011					Eskilstuna Open, Eskilstuna
2012	Open	Göteborgs DS Curt Wange, Johan Nordberg, Robert Andersson	-	-	Cops Cup XX, Gothenburg
2012	Production	Göteborgs Polismäns IF Henrik Berntsson, Rasmus Gyllenberg, Stefan Johannesson, Tony Wendelklint	Torups PK Eric Carlsson, Peter Kastell, Pär Hylander, Thomas Hjelm	Göteborgs DS Andreas Johansson, Magnus Lundström, Mats Karlsson, Per-Ola Rasmussen	Cops Cup XX, Gothenburg
2012	Standard	Borlänge PS Dan Liljeström, Johan Ekengren, Mathias Engstrand, Thomas Carlsson	Göteborgs DS Magnus Svensson, Mathias Pettersson, Mikael Östling, Robert Andersson	Malmö Skyttegille Daniel Holmberg, Hans-Erik Sjöholm, Mats O. Bäckström, Peter Lundberg	Cops Cup XX, Gothenburg
2013	Classic	Kullens PK Andreas Göthager, Faj Tran	Torups PK Lars-Åke Ingemarsson, Tord Andersson	Malmö Skyttegille Robert Söderström, Tomas Hellström	C4 Open, Kristianstad
2013	Production	Torups PK Eric Carlsson, Peter Kastell, Pär Hylander, Tommy Hjelm	Göteborgs Polismäns IF Rasmus Gyllenberg, Robert Börjesson, Stefan Johannesson, Tony Wendelklint	Växjö PK Magnus Johansson, Mikael Jung, Robert Kunst, Rune Gulbrandsen	C4 Open, Kristianstad
2013	Revolver	Jönköpings PK Håkan Eklund, Jonas Björk, Olle Lindskog	-	-	C4 Open, Kristianstad
2013	Open	Västsvenska Dynamiker Bjarne Larning, Joakim Wallin, Marcus Molin, Peter Larsson	Göteborgs DS David Ståhl, Johan Nordberg, Robert Andersson	Borlänge PS Johan Ekengren, Mathias Engstrand, Roberth Andersson, Ted Kvarnström	Swedish Championship - Open & Standard, Malmö
2013	Standard	Göteborgs Polismäns IF Mikael Olsson, Rasmus Gyllenberg, Robert Börjesson, Stefan Johannesson	Göteborgs DS Andreas Johansson, Mats Karlsson, Mikael Östling, Robert Andersson	Malmö Skyttegille Leif Madsen, Mats O. Bäckström, Otto Persson, Robert Söderström	Swedish Championship - Open & Standard, Malmö
2014	Classic	Malmö Skyttegille Andreas Kräling, Christian Luckmann, Robert Söderström	Klinte SKG Christofer Hellgren, Ivan Lundgren, John Johansson	IPSC Kristianstad Håkan T Söderholm, Jesper Dahlskog, Magnus Appelkvist, Martin Gunnarsson	C4 Open 2, Kristianstad
2014	Revolver	Republiken Jämtlands PS Ivar Edfeldt, Kalle Halvarsson, Victor Svensson	-	-	C4 Open 2, Kristianstad
2014	Standard	Växjö PK Adam Odgaard-Nexe, Magnus Johansson, Mikael Jung, Sebastian Nilsson	Sandvikens PSK Jens Söderlund, Jonas Renström, Lars Lindstedt, Lars-Tony Skoog	Malmö Skyttegille Daniel Holmberg, Mats Karlsson, Mats O. Bäckström, Teddi Sörensson	C4 Open 2, Kristianstad
2014	Open				West Coast Challenge 2014, Gothenburg
2014	Production	Växjö PK Adam Odgaard-Nexe, Magnus Johansson, Mikael Jung, Sebastian Nilsson	Göteborgs Polismäns IF Henrik Berntsson, Robert Börjesson, Stefan Johannesson, Tony Wendelklint	Göteborgs DS Andreas Johansson, Magnus Granqvist, Marcus Östling, Mikael Östling	Gothenburg Open 2014, Gothenburg
2015	Classic	Malmö Skyttegille Andreas Kräling, Boris Nilsson, Jesper Dahlskog, Robert Söderström	Torups PK Lars-Åke Ingemarsson, Nicklas Andersson, Peter Kastell, Tord Andersson	Linköping Shooting Club Fredrik Pettersson, Patrik Winell, Weine Samuelsson	West Coast Challenge 2015, Gothenburg
2015	Revolver	Republiken Jämtlands PS Kalle Halvarsson, Lars-Olof Halvarsson, Victor Svensson	Jönköpings PK #2 Daniel Härelind, Erika Härnström, Jonas Björk, Olle Lindskog	Jönköpings PK #1 Henrik Kedfors, Håkan Eklund, Olle Ahlström, Patrik Eklund	West Coast Challenge 2015, Gothenburg
2015	Open	Sandvikens PSK Jens Söderlund, Johan Ekengren, Lars-Tony Skoog, Roberth Andersson	Göteborgs DS Daniel Lilienberg, David Ståhl, Erik Stjernlöf, Johan Nordberg	Västsvenska Dynamiker Bjarne Larning, Joakim Wallin, Marcus Molin, Niklas Arabäck	Malmö Handgun Championships 2015, Malmö
2015	Production	Göteborgs Polismäns IF Cecilia Lindberg, Rasmus Gyllenberg, Robert Börjesson, Stefan Johannesson	Malmö Skyttegille Mats Karlsson, Mats O. Bäckström, Robert Söderström, Teddi Sörensson	Växjö PK Adam Odgaard-Nexe, Magnus Johansson, Mikael Jung, Sebastian Nilsson	Gothenburg Open 2015, Gothenburg
2015	Standard	Växjö PK Jörgen Björk, Magnus Johansson, Mikael Jung, Sebastian Nilsson	Sandvikens PSK Gustav Breisch, Jonas Renström, Kristian Säkki, Lars-Tony Skoog	Malmö Skyttegille Mats O. Bäckström, Per Wiklander, Robert Söderström, Teddi Sörensson	Stockholm IPSC Open, Stockholm
2016	Classic				Malmö Handgun Championships 2016, Malmö
2016	Production	Göteborgs Polismäns IF Cecilia Lindberg, Rasmus Gyllenberg, Robert Börjesson, Stefan Johannesson	Växjö PK Adam Odgaard-Nexe, Magnus Johansson, Mikael Jung, Tina Oskarsson	Södertäljepolisens Skytteförening Andreas Persson, Daniel Gulle, Niclas Dal, Ted Åhlenius	Malmö Handgun Championships 2016, Malmö
2016	Revolver	Republiken Jämtlands PS Kalle Halvarsson, Lars-Olof Halvarsson, Victor Svensson	Jönköpings PK #1 Daniel Härelind, Jonas Björk, Olle Lindskog, Patrik Eklund	Jönköpings PK #2 Erika Härnström, Håkan Eklund, Olle Ahlström	Malmö Handgun Championships 2016, Malmö
2016	Open	Göteborgs DS Daniel Lilienberg, Erik Stjernlöf, Johan Nordberg	Sandvikens PSK Jens Söderlund, Lars-Tony Skoog, Roberth Andersson, Ted Kvarnström	Stockholms LVF Erik Bjälkvall, Jim Larsén, Johan Hansen, Marianne Hansen	Stockholm IPSC Open II, Stockholm
2016	Standard	Växjö PK Magnus Johansson, Mikael Jung, Sebastian Nilsson, Tina Oskarsson	Göteborgs Polismäns IF Cecilia Lindberg, Rasmus Gyllenberg, Robert Börjesson, Stefan Johannesson	Sandvikens PSK Jonas Renström, Kristian Säkki, Lars-Tony Skoog, Robin Östman	Cops Cup/Gothenburg Open 2016, Gothenburg
2017	Classic	IPSC Smedjan Fredrik Sunnermark, Jens Sandberg, Kent Stangvik, Mikael Johansson	Republiken Jämtlands PS Bertil Haglund, Charlie Johansson, Pär Linnarsson	-	Svenska Mästerskapen 2017, Östersund
2017	Production	Göteborgs Polismäns IF Mikael Olsson, Rasmus Gyllenberg, Robert Börjesson, Stefan Johannesson	SPSF Daniel Gulle, Marjan Angelovski, Niclas Dal, Ted Åhlenius	P4 Dynamiska Skyttar Gerry Strandberg, Gustav Arvidsson, Johan Hylander, Johan Modigh	Svenska Mästerskapen 2017, Östersund
2017	Revolver	Republiken Jämtlands PS Lars-Olof Halvarsson, Victor Svensson	Jönköpings PK Jonas Björk, Olle Lindskog	IPSC Örebro Magnus Flodström, Michael Holm	Svenska Mästerskapen 2017, Östersund
2017	Open	Göteborgs DS Daniel Lilienberg, David Ståhl, Erik Stjernlöf, Johan Nordberg	Sandvikens PSK Jens Söderlund, Lars-Tony Skoog, Roberth Andersson, Ted Kvarnström	Skepplanda Bjarne Larning, Joakim Wallin, Magnus von Brömsen, Marcus Molin	Cops Cup/Gothenburg Open 2017, Gothenburg
2017	Standard	Göteborgs Polismäns IF Cecilia Lindberg, Rasmus Gyllenberg, Robert Börjesson, Stefan Johannesson	Växjö PK Adam Odgaard-Nexe, Magnus Johansson, Mikael Jung, Sebastian Nilsson	Göteborgs DS Andreas Johansson, Erik Larsson, John Hallbäck, Niklas Hammarström	Cops Cup/Gothenburg Open 2017, Gothenburg
2019	Production Optics	SPSF Niclas Dal, Magnus Pettersson, Tåbbe Asplind	Team LVF Johan Hansen, Peter Stavling, Marianne Hansen	Smedjan Optic Niklas Faltin, Fredrik Abrahamsson, Carolina Antikainen	Mälarslaget, Eskilstuna-Västerås
2019	Standard	SPSF Ted Åhlenius, Niclas Dal, Tåbbe Asplind, Jerry Vesterlund	Stockholms LVF Dan Liljeström, Jiro Nihei, Peter Stavling, Stilianos Simeonidis	Jämtland Peter Andersson, Victor Svensson, Lars-Olof Halvarsson, Peter Svedberg	Oden Cup, Uppsala
2021	Production Optics	Göteborg DS Erik Stjernlöf, Mikael Östling, Johan Norberg, Jacob Lind	Stockholm LVF Johan Hansen, Dan Liljeström, Jimmy Sjögren, Erik Bjalkvall	SPSF Ted Åhlenius, Niclas Dal, Luis Soler, Tåbbe Asplind	Oden Cup, Uppsala
2022	Open	Göteborgs DS Daniel Lilienberg, Robbin Häggmark, Erik Stjernlöf, Johan Nordberg			
2023	Open	Göteborgs DS Daniel Lilienberg, Frans Vonasek, Erik Stjernlöf, Johan Nordberg			Malmö Handgun Championship 2023

== See also ==
- Swedish Mini Rifle Championship
- Swedish Rifle Championship
- Swedish Shotgun Championship
