= Swedish Dynamic Sports Shooting Association =

Sports governing body in Sweden

- Svenska Dynamiska Sportskytteförbundet
- Formation: 1979
- Chairman: Roland Dahlman
- Parent organization: International Practical Shooting Confederation
- Website: ipsc.se

The Swedish Dynamic Sports Shooting Association (Swedish: Svenska Dynamiska Sportskytteförbundet, SDSF), is the Swedish association for practical shooting under the International Practical Shooting Confederation.

== See also ==
- Swedish Handgun Championship
- Swedish Rifle Championship
- Swedish Shotgun Championship
