= Herrljunga =

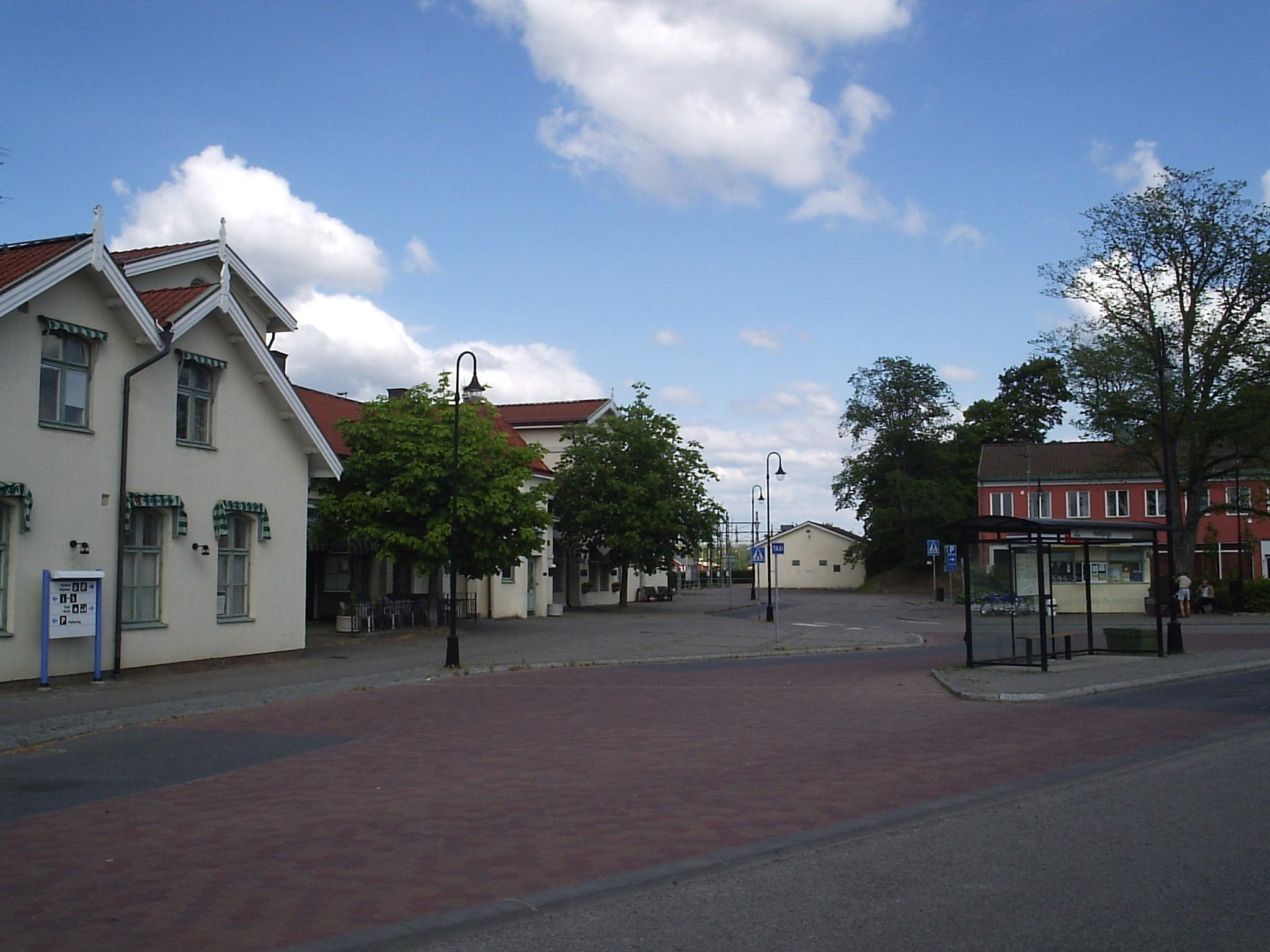
- Herrljunga

- Location within Västra Götaland Location within Sweden
- Coordinates: 58°05′N 13°02′E
- Country: Sweden
- Province: Västergötland
- County: Västra Götaland County
- Municipality: Herrljunga Municipality

Area
  - Total: 3.71 km^{2} (1.43 sq mi)

Population (31 December 2010)
  - Total: 3,822
  - Density: 1,031/km^{2} (2,670/sq mi)
- Time zone: UTC+1 (CET)
  - Summer (DST): UTC+2 (CEST)
- Climate: Cfb

Herrljunga is a locality and the seat of Herrljunga Municipality, Västra Götaland County, Sweden. It had 3,822 inhabitants in 2010.

== Overview ==
The town grew up around a railway junction. From 1906 it had the status of a municipalsamhälle (a form of borough) within the rural municipality, also called Herrljunga. Today it is the seat of the much larger Herrljunga Municipality.

Herrljunga is known for Herrljunga Cider, that as of 2005 had the largest market share of cider in daily stores in Sweden with 16%. It's also known for its large railway connection, connecting Västra stambanan, a railway connection between the two largest Swedish cities, Gothenburg and Stockholm. It is also connected by the Älvsborg Line, leading northwards towards Vänersborg and Uddevalla. Southwards it leads to Borås and from there most trains continue on Viskadal Line to the west coast at Varberg.
