= Western Main Line =

Railway line in Sweden

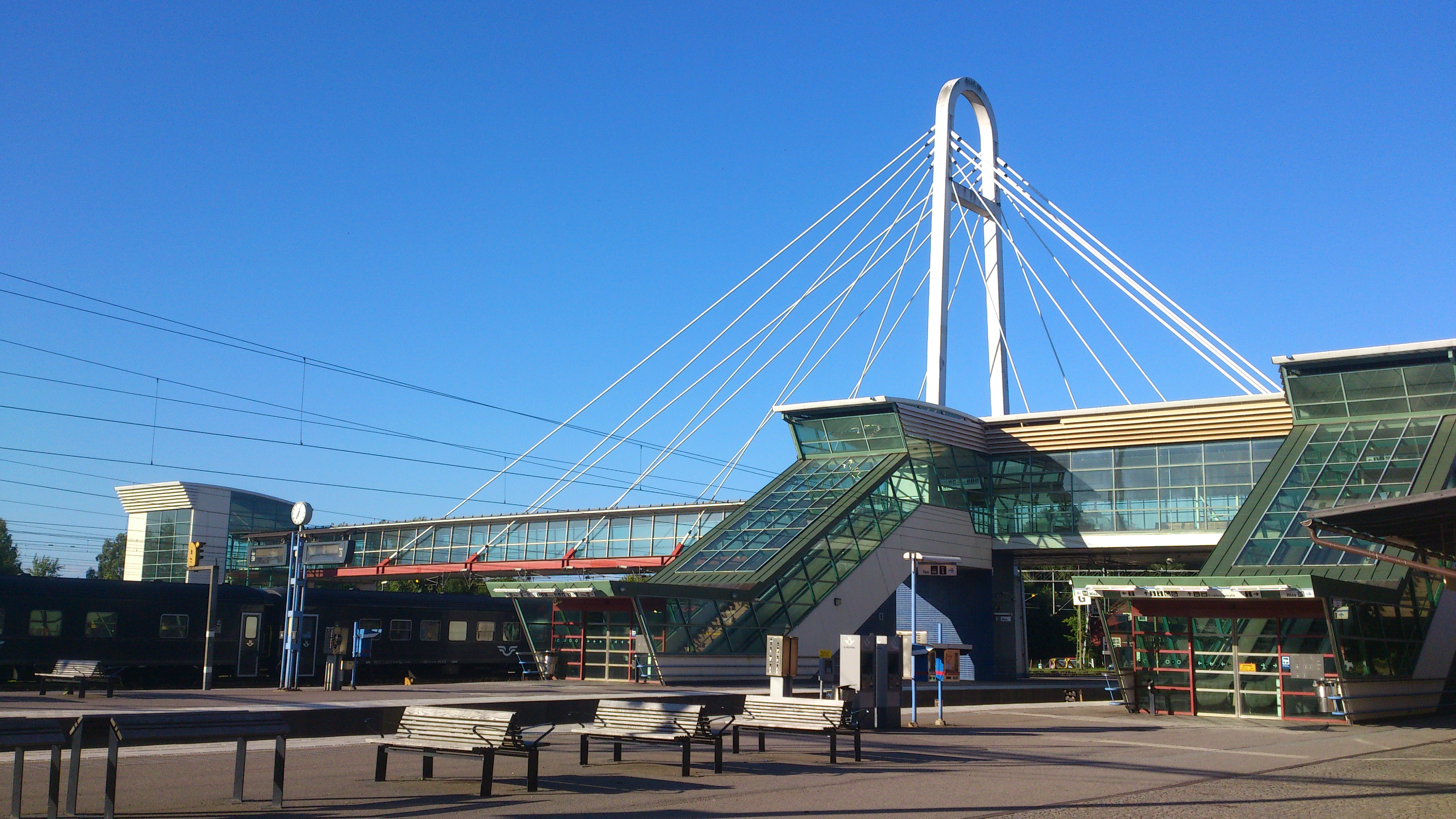
- The railway station in Hallsberg is a junction station on Västra stambanan.

Overview
- Owner: Swedish state
- Termini: Stockholm; Gothenburg

History
- Opened: 3 November 1862

Technical
- Operating speed: 200 km/h (125 mph)

The Western Main Line (Swedish: Västra stambanan) is the main state-owned railway line between Stockholm and Gothenburg in Sweden. Its construction began in 1856 and it opened for service in 1862.

Maintained by the Swedish Transport Administration, the Western Main Line is electrified and consists entirely of double track, except the four-track sections between Gothenburg Central Station and Olskroken (2 km or 1.2 mi), and between Järna (5 km or 3.1 mi), and Stockholm Södra station, about 46 km (29 mi). The last section between Stockholm Södra station and Stockholm Central Station runs mainly on a two track bridge. Before the Stockholm City Line was opened in 2017, the bridge was a serious bottleneck, as all trains had to use the same tracks.

== Operating speed ==
The maximum speed on the line is 200 km/h (125 mph). A section of the line, between Skövde and Töreboda, is the longest straight section of railway in Sweden, with almost 40 km (25 mi) of track without a curve, and has therefore been used in speed trials. The current Swedish speed record of 303 km/h (188 mph) was achieved here by a X50 "Regina" EMU. The line has always been known for its high speeds. As early as the 1950s, the Rapid engines travelled the route at 150 km/h (95 mph).

== Future plans ==
=== Götalandsbanan ===
There were previously plans to build a high-speed line between Stockholm and Gothenburg, south of lake Vättern, Götalandsbanan. The route would capable of speeds of 320 km/h (200 mph). The purpose of the railway was to reduce travel times between Stockholm and Gothenburg to 2 hours and 15 minutes, while also connecting more large cities, such as Jönköping and Borås, to the high speed railway.

In 2022, the newly elected Kristersson cabinet cancelled the high speed railway plans citing economic concerns, asking the Swedish Transport Administration to instead prioritize maintenance on the current railways.

=== Two new tracks between Gothenburg and Alingsås ===
The current dual track railway between Gothenburg and Alingsås is one of the most crowded sections of the Western Main Line, with high speed trains, commuter trains, regional trains and cargo trains all being present and competing for capacity. In April of 2026, the Swedish government announced it would allocate 4,2 billion SEK to build to new tracks between the two cities. As of now, there is no estimated date for when the project will be finished.

== See also ==
- Southern Main Line
