= Vega (disambiguation) =

Vega is a star in the constellation Lyra.

Vega or VEGA may also refer to:

== Places ==
=== Norway ===
- Vega Municipality, a municipality in Nordland county
- Vega (island in Norway), an island within Vega Municipality in Nordland county
- Vega Archipelago, an archipelago and UNESCO site in Nordland county
- Vega Church, a church in Vega Municipality in Nordland county

=== Spain ===
- Vega (Aller), Asturias
- Vega, Gijón, Asturias
- Vega de Granada, Andalusia

=== United States ===
- Vega, Georgia
- Vega, Ohio
- Vega, Texas

=== Elsewhere ===
- Vega (crater), the Moon
- Vega, Alberta, Canada
- Vega, Copenhagen, a concert hall in Copenhagen
- Vega, Sweden, Sweden
  - Vega railway station, on Stockholm commuter rail
- La Vega, Dominican Republic
- Vega Island, Antarctica

== Aerospace ==
- Vega (crater), on the Moon
- Vega (rocket), a European expendable small-lift launch vehicle
- Lockheed Vega, an American monoplane produced 1927–1931
- Percival Vega Gull, a British aircraft produced 1935–1939
- Slingsby Vega, a British glider
- Stern ST 87 Vega, a French homebuilt aircraft design
- Vega Aircraft Corporation, a subsidiary of Lockheed
- Vega program, a series of space missions
- VEGA Space GmbH, a European aerospace company that merged into Telespazio VEGA Deutschland
- Vega Space UK, a UK-based space company
- Walter Vega, a Czechoslovak radial aeroengine

== Arts, entertainment, and media ==
=== Fictional characters ===
- Vega (Street Fighter), a Street Fighter character, named Balrog in Japan
  - M. Bison, the main antagonist of the Street Fighter universe, known as Vega in Japan
- King Vega, a Ufo Robot Grendizer character
- Vega Obscura, a Zoids: New Century Zero character
- Vega, a Gear Fighter Dendoh character
- General Vega, a characters from the video game Command & Conquer: Tiberian Sun
- James Vega, a character in the Mass Effect series
- Tori Vega and Trina Vega, characters in the Nickelodeon sitcom Victorious
- Vic and Vincent Vega, brothers from the Quentin Tarantino films Pulp Fiction and Reservoir Dogs
- VEGA, a self-aware artificial intelligence in Doom and Doom Eternal

=== Music ===
- Vega Company, a musical instruments manufacturer
- Vega (British band), a melodic rock/AOR band formed in 2009
- Vega (singer), a Spanish singer-songwriter
- Vega (Turkish band), an alternative rock band formed in 1996
- Vega, Copenhagen, a Danish concert hall
- Vega, an album by Janvs
- Vega, a 2024 album by Anberlin
- "Vega", an outro song by Breaking Benjamin from the 2018 album Ember
- Vega, a 2018 album by Danheim
- "Vega", a song by Ed Sheeran from the album -, 2023

=== Other media ===
- Vega (radio network), a now-defunct Australian network
  - Smooth 95.3 (formerly Vega 95.3), an Australian radio station
- Yle Vega, a Finnish radio channel broadcasting in Swedish

== Businesses and organizations ==
- Vega (company), a nutrition brand
- Vega Company, a musical instrument manufacturer
- Facel Vega, a French car manufacturer (1954–1964)
- Vega Group, a Russian special forces unit
- Vega Industries, a New Zealand marine light manufacturer
- Vega Radio Engineering Corporation, a Russian military surveillance radio maker
- Vega Sicilia, a Spanish winery
- Vega Telecommunications Group, a Ukrainian telecommunications provider
- Volunteers for Economic Growth Alliance, an international development group

== People ==
- Vega (singer) (born 1979), Spanish singer-songwriter
- Vega (surname), a list of people so named
- Vega Ioane (born 2004), American football player
- Vega Jurij (1754–1802), Slovene mathematician, physicist and artillery officer
- Vega Tamotia (born 1985), Australian actress

== Schools ==
- Vega School, a private university in South Africa
- Vega High School, Vega, Texas, U.S.
- Vega Schools, Gurgaon, Haryana state, India

== Science, technology and medicine ==
- Vega, the GPU architecture from Vivante Corporation
- Vega, line of GPUs manufactured by Video Seven
- AMD Vega, the GPU architecture featured in the Radeon RX Vega line of GPUs
- Radeon RX Vega series, graphics processors developed by AMD
- Vega machine, an electrodiagnostic device
- Vertebrate and Genome Annotation Project (VEGA), a biological database
- Vega and Vega-Lite visualisation grammars, visualization tools implementing a grammar of graphics in JavaScript

== Ships ==
- HMS Vega, several ships of the British Royal Navy
- HSwMS Vega, several ships of the Swedish Navy
- MS Vega, now MS Mytilene, a Greek ferry ship
- SS Vega, various steamships
- USS Vega, several ships of the United States Navy
- Vega, a Finnish schooner; see Finnish war reparations to the Soviet Union

== Vehicles ==
- Chevrolet Vega, an American subcompact made in the 1970s
- Vega EVX, a Sri Lankan electric coupe
- Ford Vega, a concept car
- Facel Vega, a French performance luxury car made in the 1950s

== Other uses ==
- Vega (grape), a white Italian wine grape
- Vega, or grass valley, a meadow located within a forested and relatively small drainage basin
- Vega, in finance a measure of sensitivity to volatility; see Greeks (finance)
- Vega (horse), a Japanese Thoroughbred racehorse
- Vega Medal, awarded by the Swedish Society for Anthropology and Geography

== See also ==
- Vegam (disambiguation)
- Bega (disambiguation)
- De la Vega (disambiguation)
- Vegan (disambiguation)
- Vegas (disambiguation)
- Viga (disambiguation)
- WEGA, a radio company, acquired by Sony in 1975
