= Bega =

Bega may refer to:

== People ==
- Saint Bega
- Bega (surname)

== Places ==
- Bega, New South Wales, a town in New South Wales, Australia
  - Bega Valley Shire, a coastal local government area in New South Wales
  - Electoral district of Bega, a New South Wales electoral district
- Bega, alternative name for Beica, a town in southwestern Ethiopia
- Bega (Dörentrup), a small village next to Dörentrup in Lippe district, Germany

Rivers:

- Bega River (New South Wales), a river in Australia
- Bega (Werre), a river in Germany
- Bega (Tisza), also Begej, a river in Romania and Serbia
- Bega Luncanilor, a headwater of the Bega in Romania
- Bega Poienilor, another headwater of the Bega in Romania
- Bega Veche, a tributary of the Bega in Romania

== Other uses ==
- Bega Canal, in Romania and Serbia
- Bega Group, an Australian food and drinks manufacturer
- BEGA League, a group of characters in the anime/manga Beyblade
- Bega Valley Rally, a car rally centred in Bega, New South Wales
- Bega, or Summer, in seasons of Ethiopia
