= HSwMS Vega =

HSwMS Vega is the name of the following ships of the Swedish Navy

- HSwMS Vega (1910), a 1.-class torpedo boat
- HSwMS Vega (T125), a Spica-class torpedo boat launched in 1966 and decommissioned 1989

== See also ==
- Vega (disambiguation)
