= Jordbro railway station =

Railway station in Haninge, Sweden

Jordbro
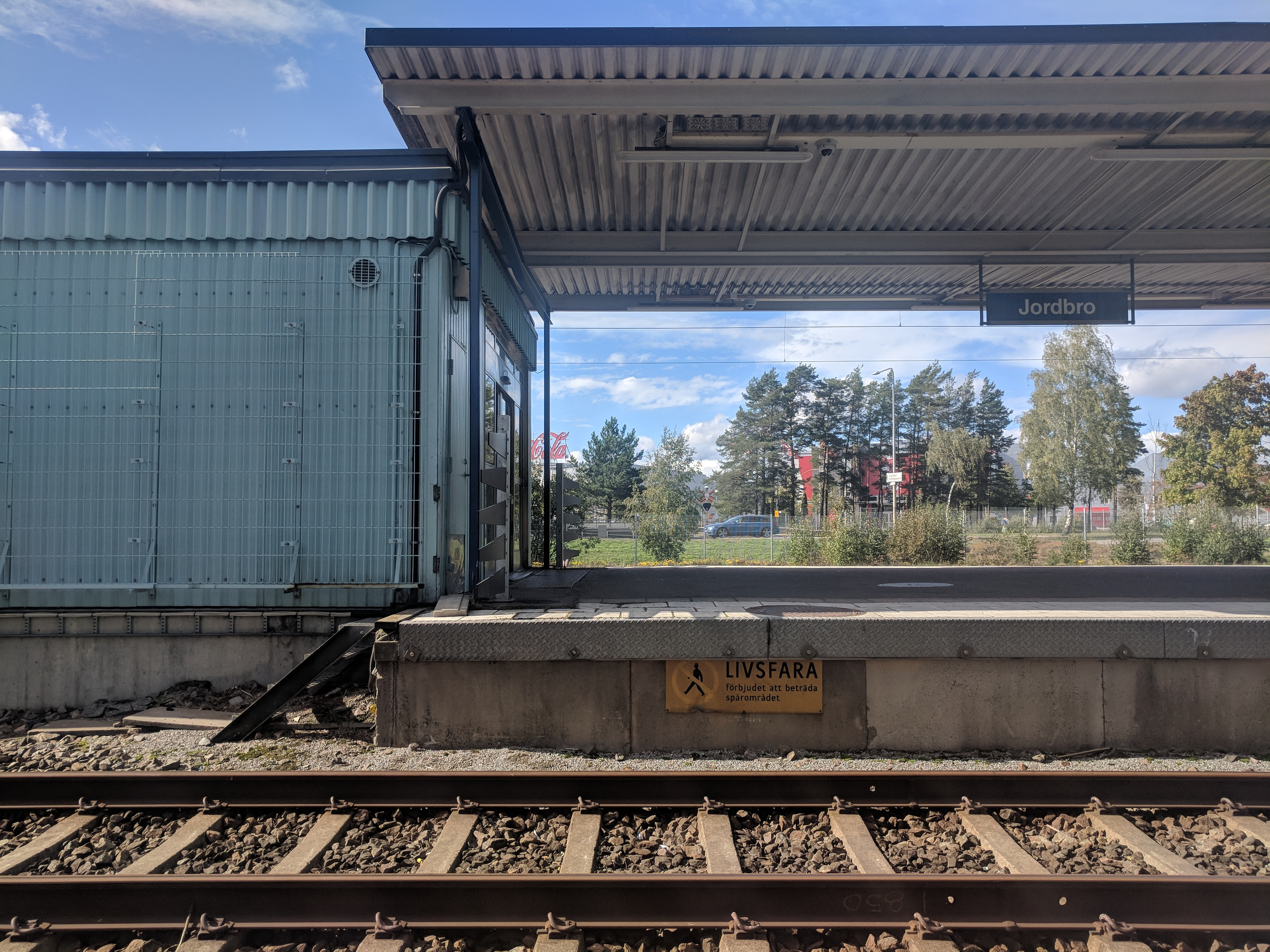
- Jordbro station in 2018

General information
- Location: Stockholm County
- Coordinates: 59°8′16″N 18°6′21″E
- System: Pendeltåg
- Owner: Swedish Transport Administration
- Platforms: 1 island platform
- Tracks: 2

Construction
- Structure type: At-grade

Other information
- Station code: Jbo

History
- Opened: 1901 (original), 1973 (current)

Passengers
- 2015: 3,700 boarding per weekday (2015) (commuter rail)

Services
Preceding station	Stockholm commuter rail	Following station
Handen towards Bålsta	43	Västerhaninge towards Nynäshamn
Location

Jordbro is a station on Stockholm's commuter rail network, located in the urban area of Jordbro within Haninge Municipality. It is situated on the Nynäs Line, 28.8 km from Stockholm Central Station. The station has a single island platform with entrances at both ends. As of 2015, approximately 3,700 passengers boarded trains at Jordbro each weekday. Several SL bus lines also serve the station.

== History ==
When the Nynäs Line was inaugurated in 1901, a stop was established on the then single-track route between Älvsjö and Nynäshamn. In the early 1960s, development in the area around the stop accelerated, and a rail connection to the Jordbro industrial area was constructed. A new commuter rail station was introduced in 1973. In 1995, the line was upgraded to double track, during which the station was renovated and a northern entrance was added.

== Gallery ==
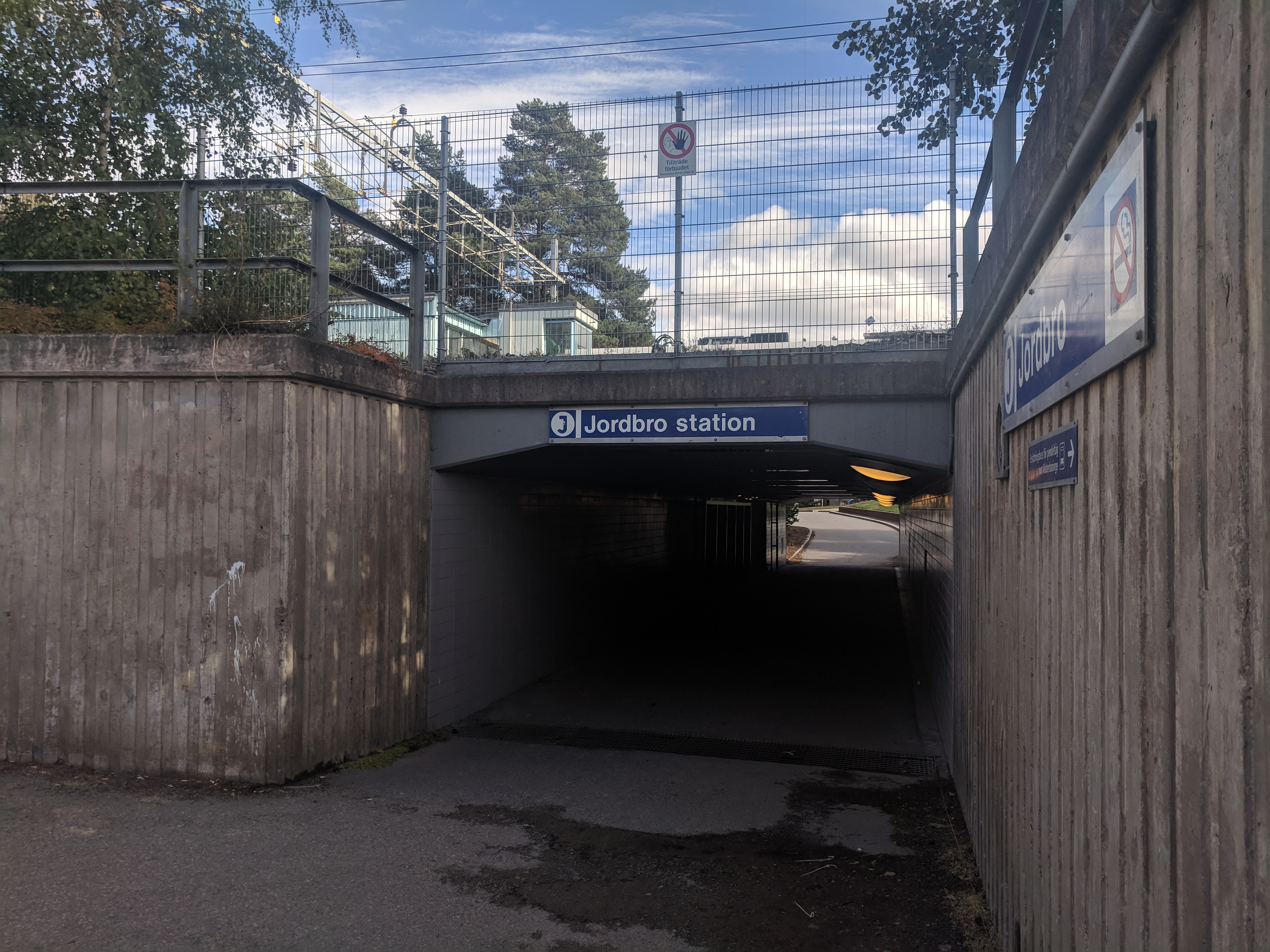
Station entrance

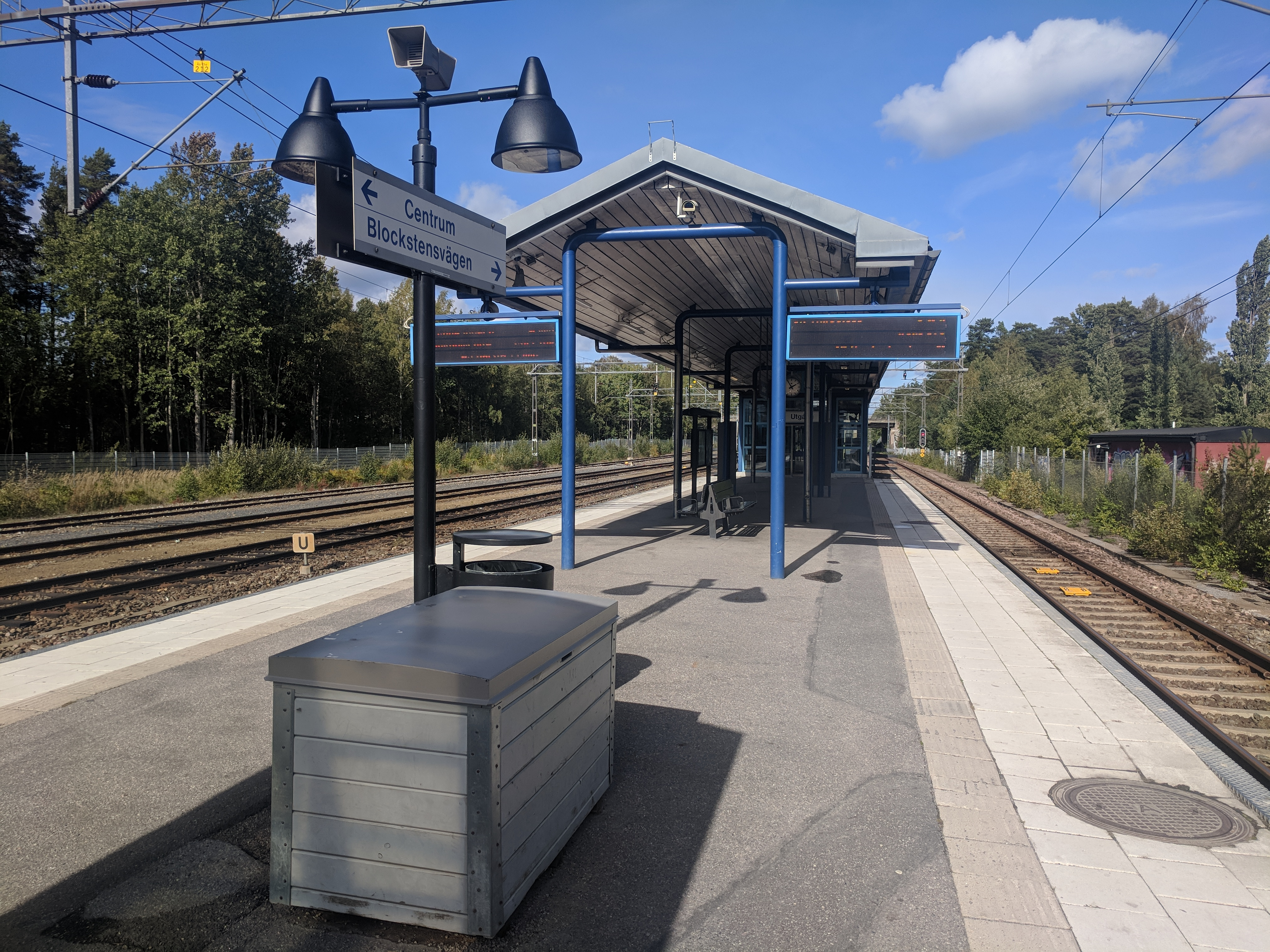
Platform

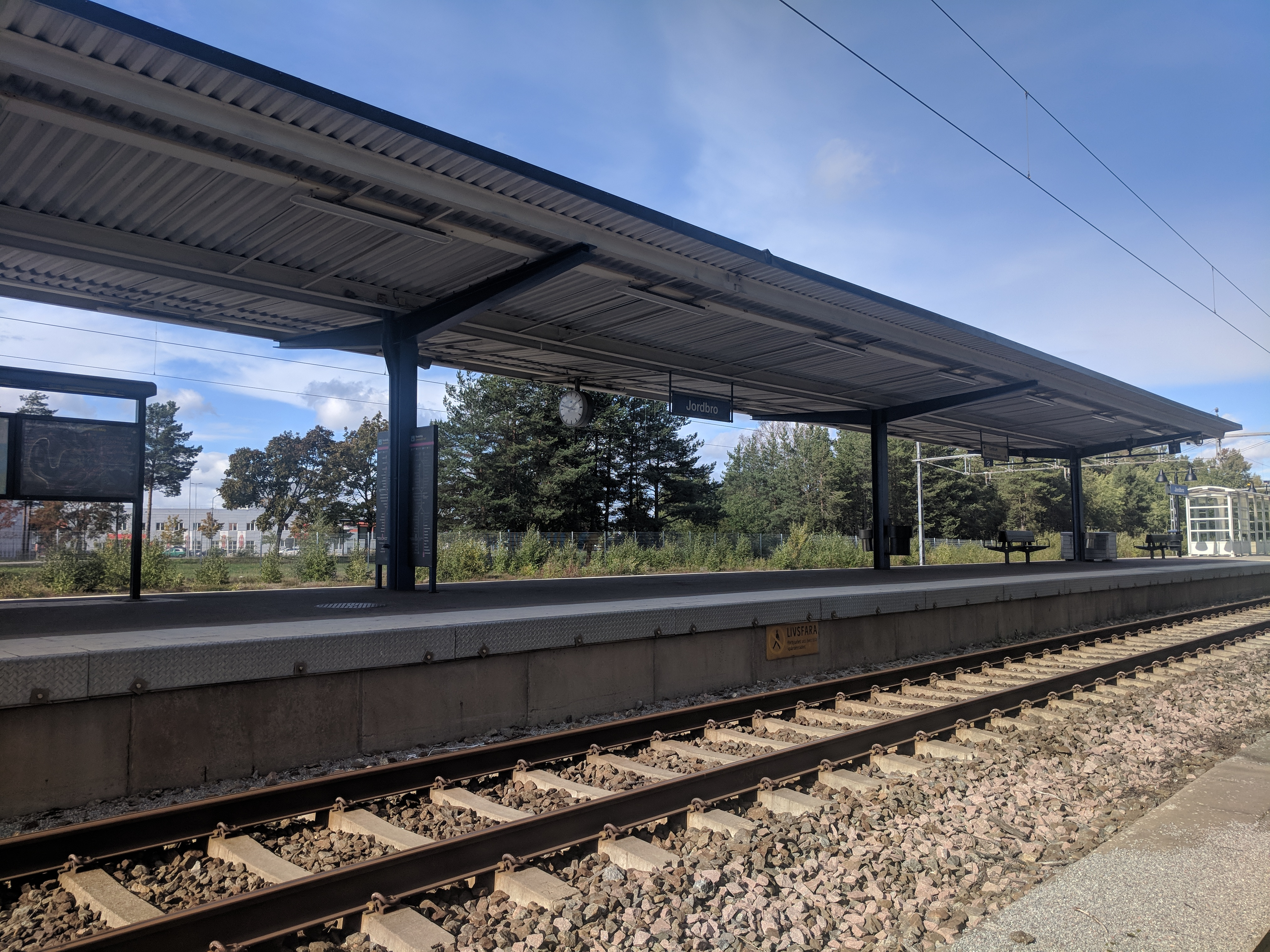
Platform view

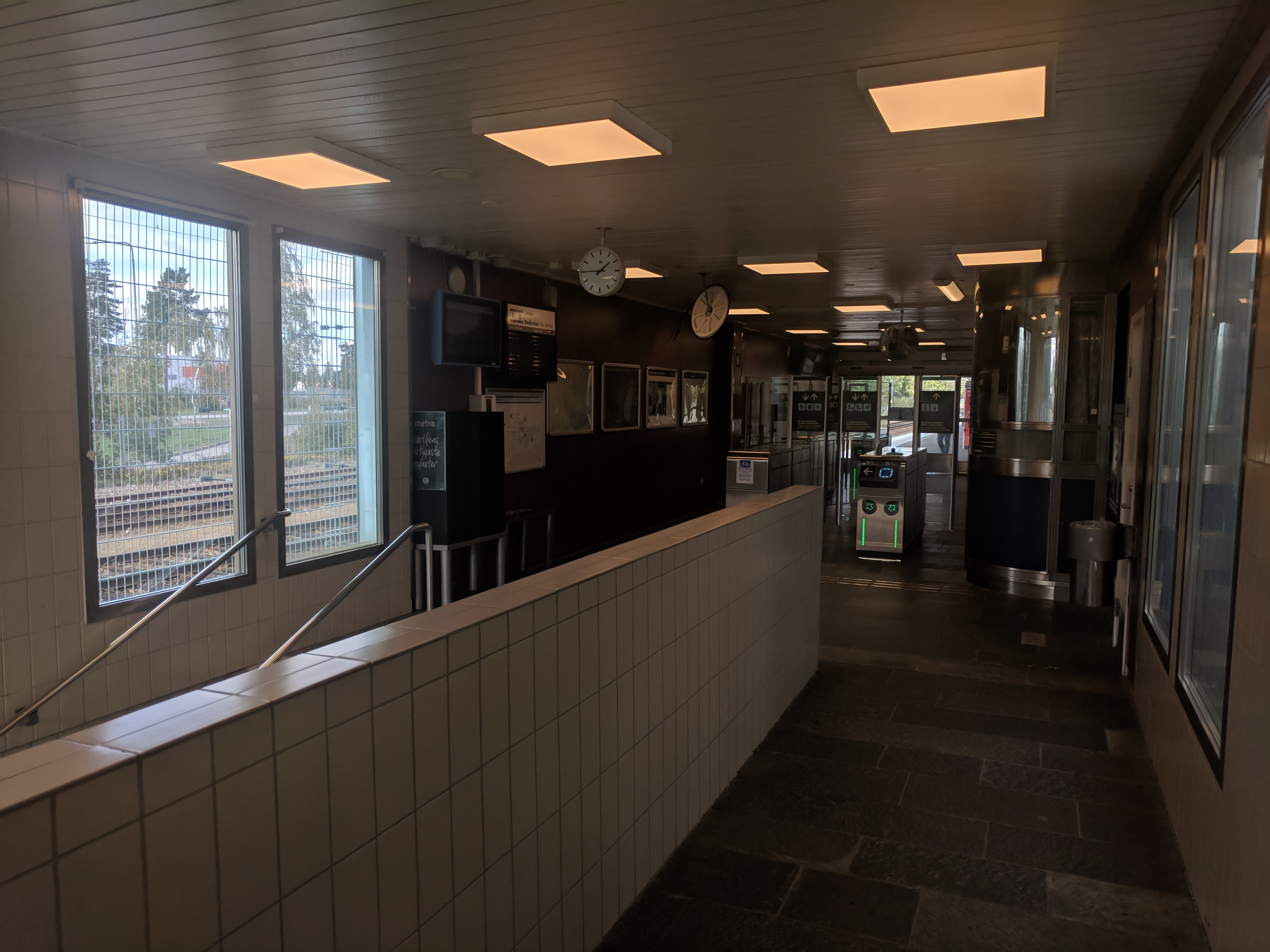
Ticket hall

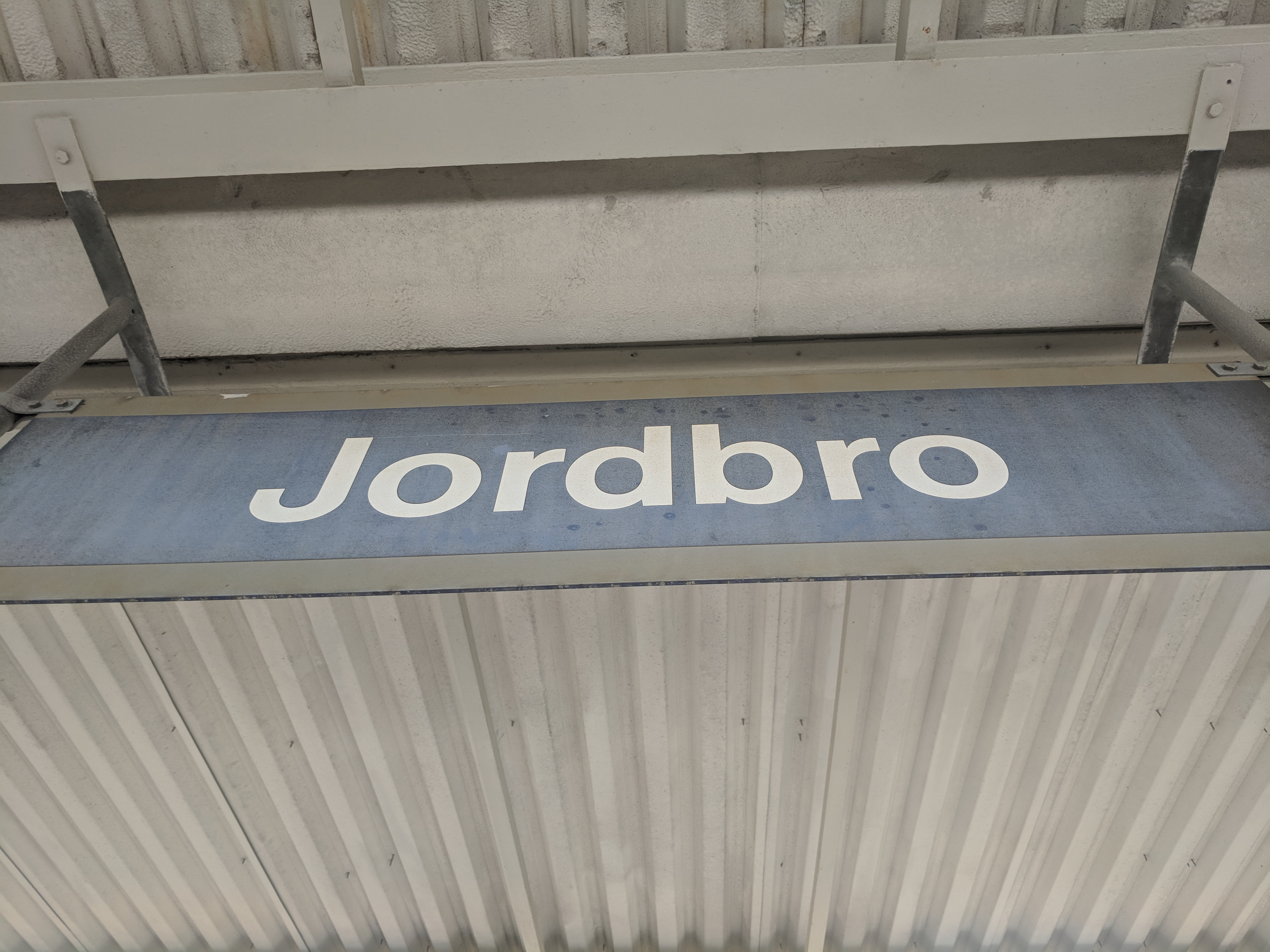
Station sign
