= Vegam =

Vegam may refer to:

- Vegam (2006 film), a 2006 Indian film
- Vegam (2007 film), a 2007 Indian Tamil-language film by K. R. Udhayashankar, starring Ashwin Shekhar and Veda Sastry
- Vegam (2013 film), a 2013 Indian Telugu-language film by Ajay Kumar Y, starring Karthik and Sruthi Raj
- Vegam (2014 film), a 2014 Indian Malayalam-language film by K. G. Anil Kumar, starring Vineeth Kumar and Jacob Gregory

== See also ==
- Vega (disambiguation)
