= Vegan (disambiguation) =

A vegan is a person who follows the philosophy and diet of veganism.

Vegan may also refer to:

- Vegan, West Virginia, a town in the United States
- Vega (Alpha Lyrae), a star
- Vegan, a native or resident of Las Vegas, Nevada, United States
- Vegan, a creature in the artwork of Trenton Doyle Hancock
- The Vegan, a 2023 book by Andrew Lipstein

== See also ==
- Vega (disambiguation)
- List of vegans, notable people who practice veganism
- List of vegan media
- Vegetarian
- Vigan, a city in the Philippines
