= Handen railway station =

Railway station in Haninge, Sweden

Handen
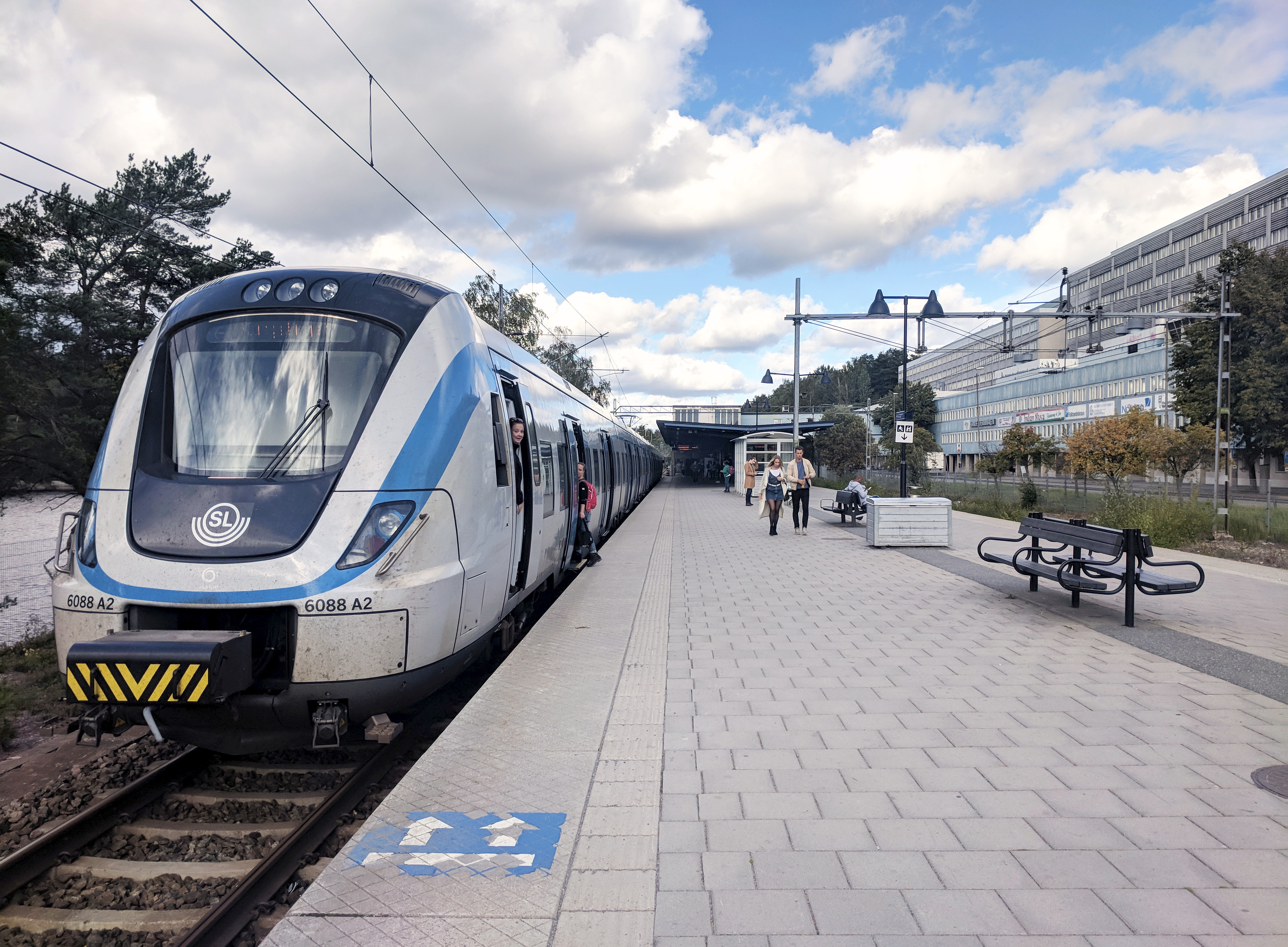
- Handen station in 2018

General information
- Location: Stockholm County
- Coordinates: 59°10′0″N 18°8′3″E
- System: Pendeltåg
- Owner: Swedish Transport Administration
- Platforms: 1 island platform
- Tracks: 2

Construction
- Structure type: At-grade

Other information
- Station code: Hnd

History
- Opened: 1901 (original), 1973 (current)
- Former names: Österhaninge (until 1913), Haninge centrum (1989-2006)

Passengers
- 2015: 7,500 boarding per weekday (2015) (commuter rail)

Services
Preceding station	Stockholm commuter rail	Following station
Vega towards Bålsta	43	Jordbro towards Nynäshamn
Location

Handen is a station on Stockholm's commuter rail network, located 26 km from Stockholm Central Station on the Nynäs Line. The station consists of a single island platform with a ticket hall integrated into a pedestrian bridge connecting to a bus terminal. The station opened in its current location in 1973 and serves as a major transit hub for bus and rail traffic within Haninge Municipality. As of 2015, approximately 7,500 passengers boarded trains at Handen each weekday, while the entire terminal area saw about 13,400 daily boarding passengers.

== History ==
The original station, located a few hundred meters north of the current site, opened in 1901 as "Österhaninge station," named after Österhaninge Parish. It was later renamed "Handen" in 1913 to avoid confusion with the local post office, which had the same name. The name "Handen" was controversial among locals, as it referred to a small tavern with a poor reputation. An alternative proposal, "Täckåker," was rejected.

The station previously had a small locomotive depot. When Storstockholms Lokaltrafik (SL) took over operations and introduced the commuter rail system, major changes were made: a new station and bus terminal were built further south, and freight traffic was moved to Jordbro. The current Handen station opened on April 1, 1973. In 1989, the municipality renamed the station "Haninge centrum," but this caused confusion as the shopping center Haninge Centrum was not directly adjacent to the station, while the bus terminal remained named "Handenterminalen." The original name "Handen" was restored in 2006.

Handen has the longest platform on the SL commuter rail network, measuring 320 meters. The platform's length was dictated by the positioning of the two pedestrian bridges, which are aligned with surrounding buildings.

During the 1970s and 1980s, the area around Handen station underwent significant urban development, transforming from a suburban stop into a key regional centre. The construction of Haninge Centrum shopping centre, municipal offices, and residential high-rises contributed to the station's importance.

== Gallery ==
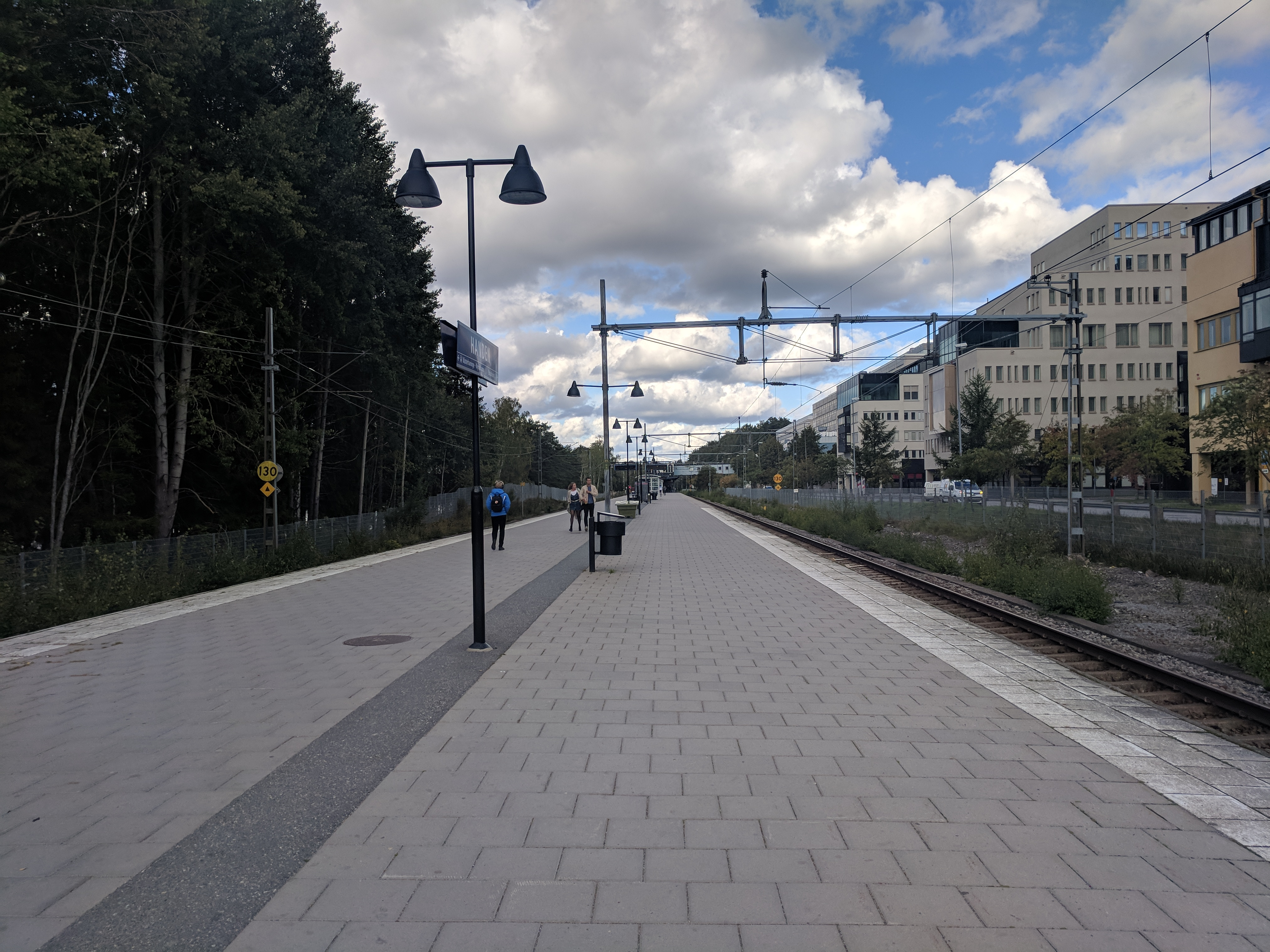
Platform

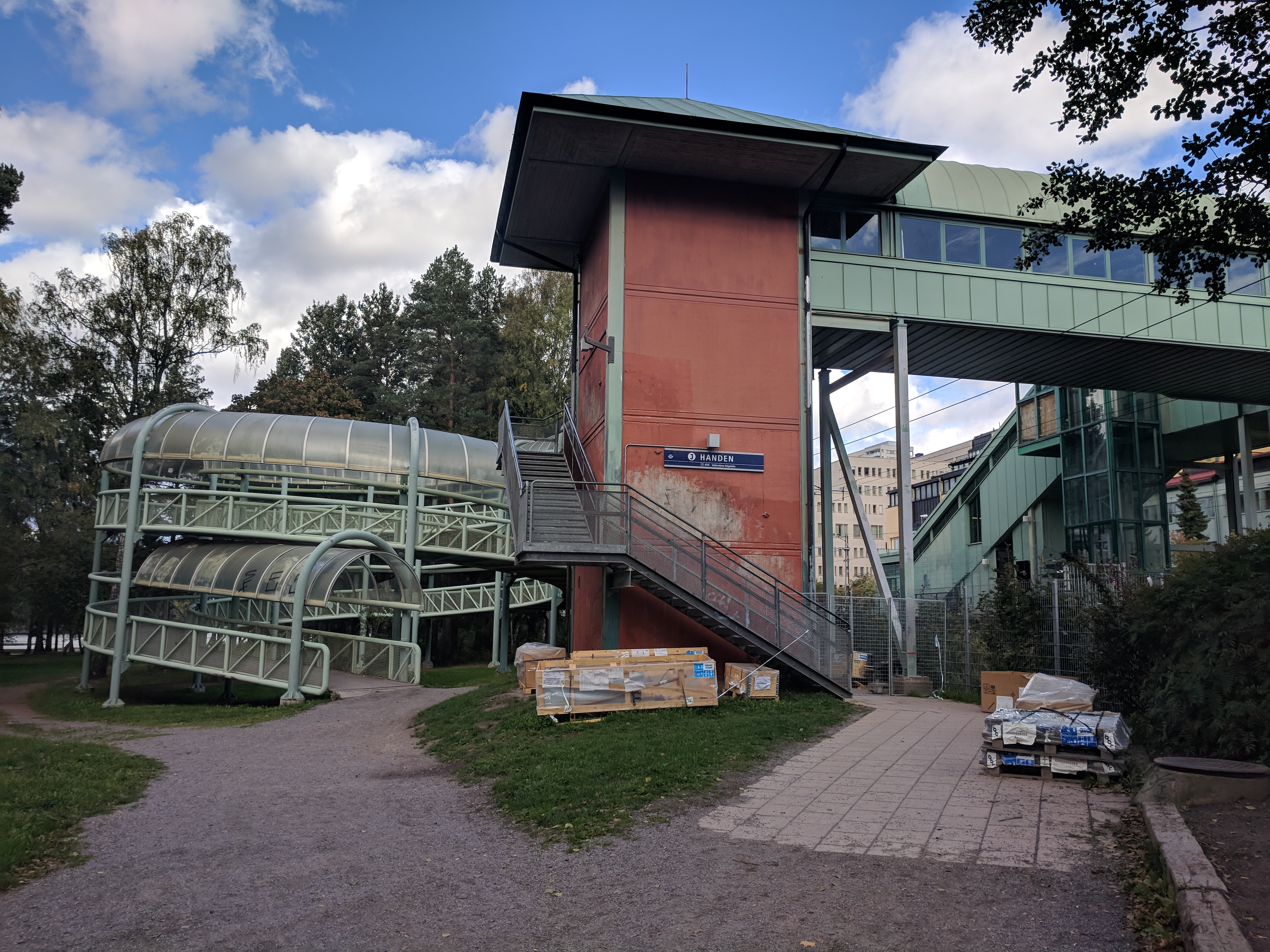
Station entrance

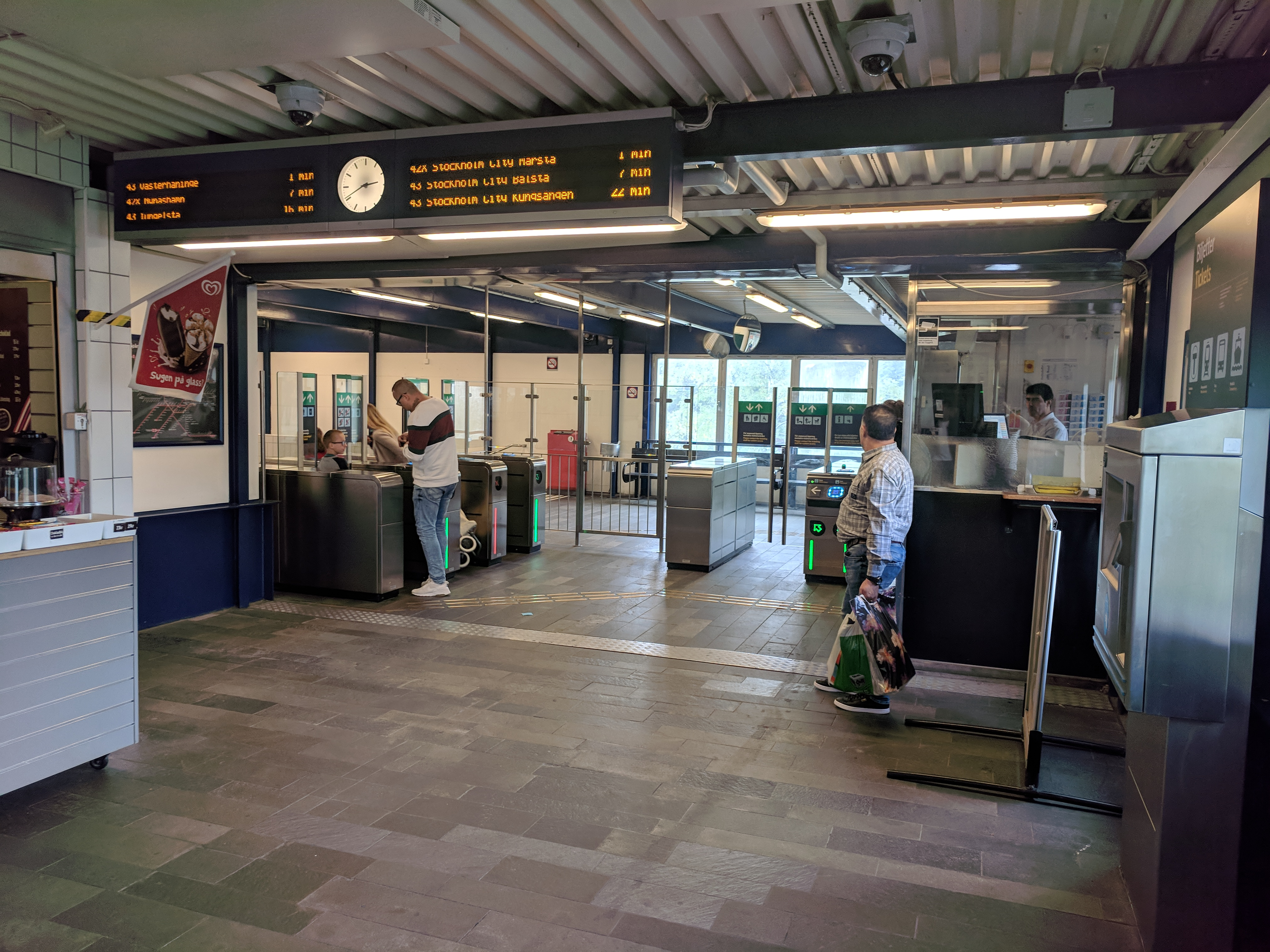
Ticket hall

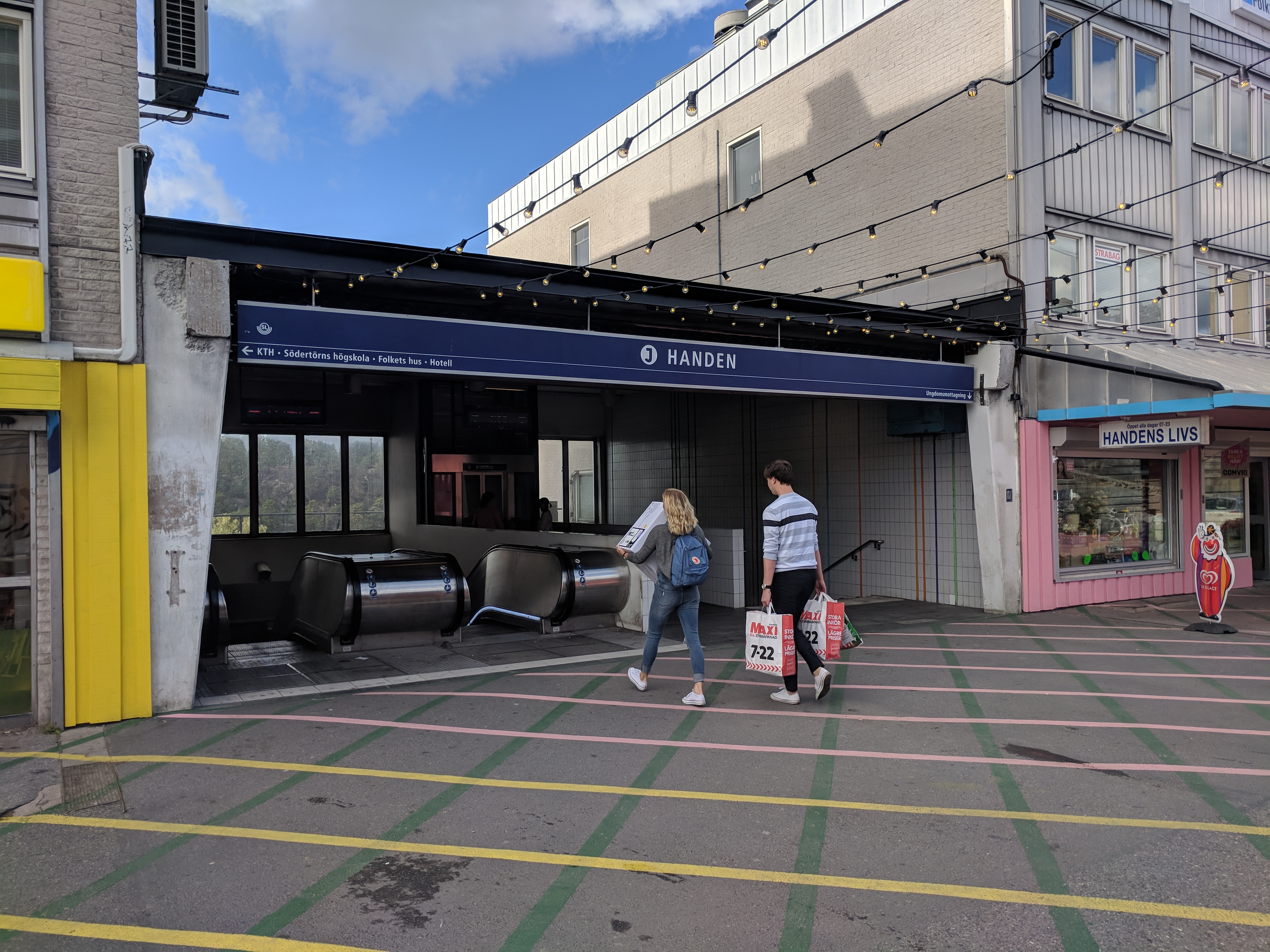
Entrance

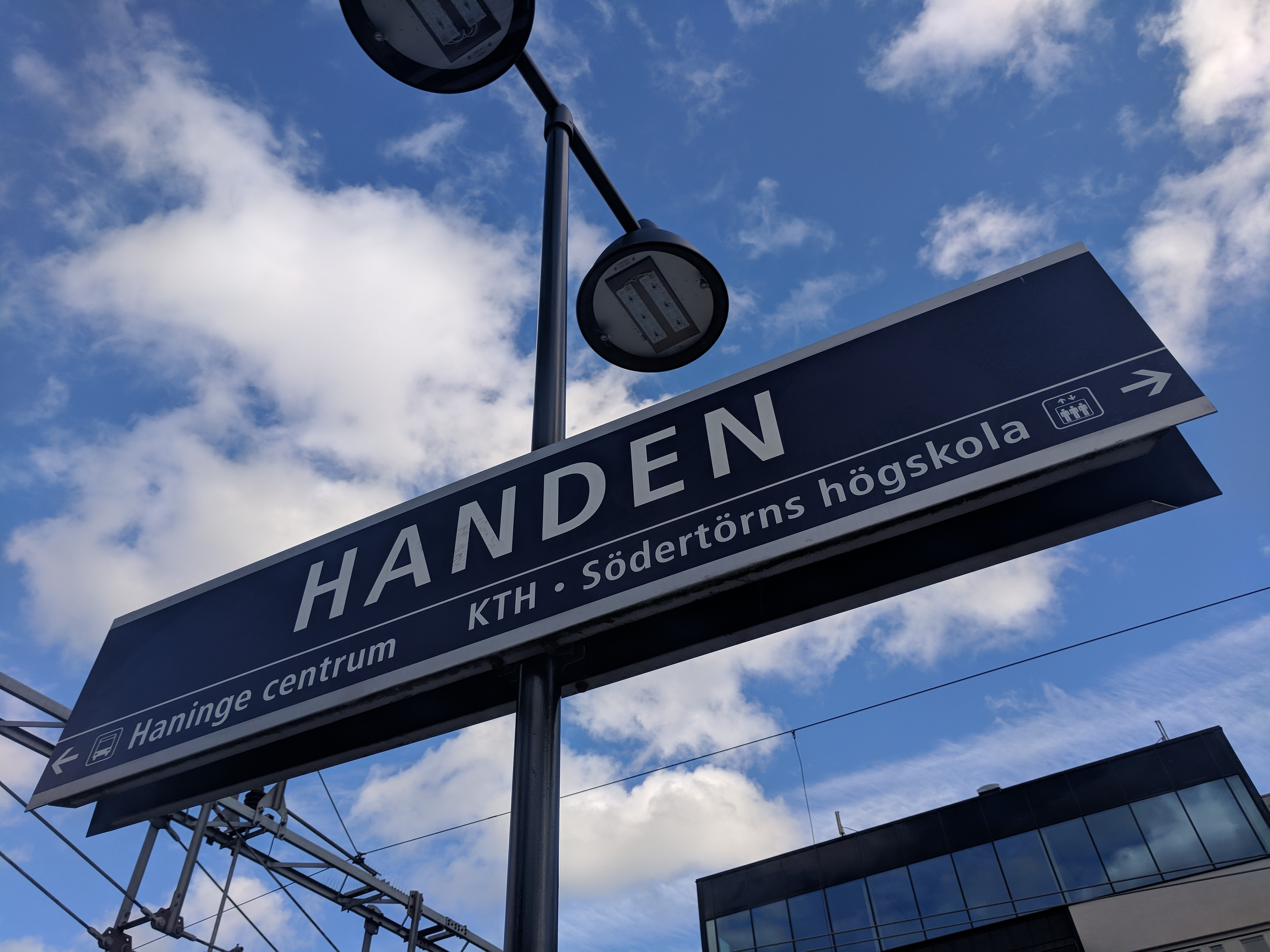
Station sign
