= International Executive Service Corps =

International not-for-profit organization

- Formation: 1964; 62 years ago
- Headquarters: Washington, D.C.
- Region served: Worldwide
- Fields: Supporting private enterprise in developing countries
- Key people: David Hartingh (President, CEO); Wing Keith (Chair)
- Website: iesc.org
- Formerly called: International Executive Service Corps

Improving Economies for Stronger Communities is an international economic development not-for-profit organization with headquarters in Washington, D.C. IESC was founded in 1964 by David Rockefeller, States M. Mead III, Frank Pace, Sol Linowitz, and other American business leaders. IESC has worked in sub-Saharan Africa, Europe and Eurasia, Asia and the Near East, and Latin America and the Caribbean. Geekcorps is a division of IESC.

IESC's stated mission is to improve living standards by strengthening private enterprise. Since its founding, IESC claims to have helped businesses create or save over 1.5 million jobs, with projects serviced by a combination of staff, consultants and volunteers.

== History ==
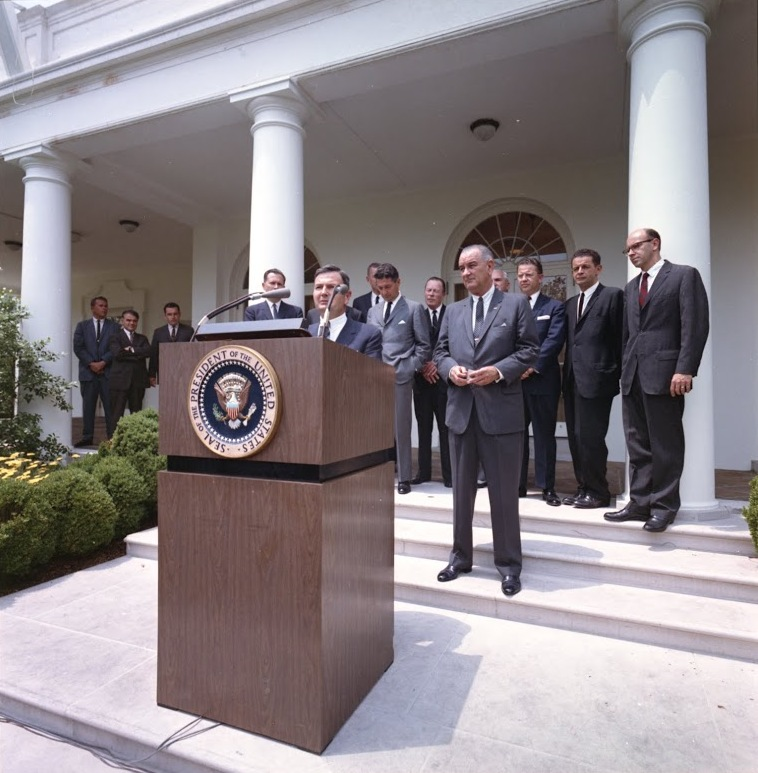
David Rockefeller and President Johnson launch IESC in the White House Rose Garden in 1964

IESC's first board meeting took place on June 15, 1964, in Washington D.C. and included American business leaders including David Rockefeller; president of Chase Manhattan Bank; Ray R. Eppert: president of Burroughs Corporation; C. D. Jackson, senior vice president of Time, Inc.; John H. Johnson, president of Johnson Publishing; Dan A. Kimball, chairman of Aerojet; Sol M. Linowitz, chairman of Xerox Corporation; and William S. Paley, chairman of CBS. C.D. Jackson died in the opening days of his chairmanship of IESC and was replaced by Frank Pace. By 1965, IESC was operating in Thailand, where Raytheon executive Ray Ellis was assigned as management advisor to T. S. Lin, President of Tatung Engineering Company. On March 7, 1972, IESC representatives headed by A. A. Wilcox visited Malacañang Palace in the Philippines, accompanied by Marikina municipal mayor Osmundo de Guzman, to engage in a call with president Ferdinand Marcos.

When IESC celebrated its 20th anniversary in 1984, the organization was working in 74 developing countries. Since then the total number of IESC project countries has doubled to more than 130 countries.

In 1998, U.S. President Bill Clinton awarded the Presidential Medal of Freedom to David Rockefeller for his work in creating the IESC.

== Practice areas ==
IESC offers services in the areas of trade and competitiveness, financial services, tourism development, information and communications technology, capacity building, and health and business training services. Throughout its 50-year history, IESC has developed expertise in technical, managerial and professional assistance consulting; micro-, small- and medium-sized enterprise support; market development; institution strengthening; quality enhancement; grants management; health and human resources; public administration and policy; and conflict and post-conflict management. It often carries those activities out through training programs, workshops and seminars.

== Recent projects ==
In 2010, Ambassador Thomas J. Miller took over as CEO for IESC. Under Miller's leadership, IESC's budget has grown from an initial $5 million in 2010 to $30 million in 2013. In 2011, IESC began a project to train 126 South Sudanese diplomatic officials and fully integrate South Sudan's Ministry of Foreign Affairs into the world of global diplomacy.

In 2012, IESC won a $105 million award to support certain key sectors of the economy in Afghanistan, the organization's largest-ever award. The project is a collaboration between IESC and the Volunteers for Economic Growth Alliance (VEGA) and is called the Assistance in Building Afghanistan by Developing Enterprises (ABADE) Program. ABADE aims to enable Afghan entrepreneurs to grow successful businesses by providing technical assistance, business consulting, and facilitating public-private partnerships.

In Lebanon, IESC administers the USAID-funded Lebanon Investment in Microfinance Program (LIM) program to help small business owners apply for micro-loans to expand their businesses. Established in May 2009, IESC's LIM program had awarded grants of over $8m to Lebanese microfinance institutions by October 2014, which in turn had disbursed a total value of over $27m across 12,00 micro loans. As a result, the program has supported nearly 19,000 jobs and created nearly 3,000 positions, of which around 45% have been filled by women.

In Ethiopia, IESC has implemented six USAID programs since 2004 designed to increase exports, strengthen institutions, and promote access to finance.

In Tunisia, IESC administers a project that helps local entrepreneurs tap international trade opportunities through an online platform. The IESC has traveled to Tunisia previously in November 1995, to help local brokers improve their balance sheets and their share evaluations.

In Mali, volunteers from IESC's Geekcorps built or refurbished radio stations on the edges of the Saharan desert, helping to deliver internet access to remote parts of the country.

In Morocco, IESC has implemented the Morocco Commercial Development Organization Support Program which seeks to assist commercial development organizations by facilitating access to capital and export markets.

In Liberia, IESC implements the USAID's Liberia Investing for Business Expansion (IBEX) Program by providing advice, mentoring and facilitating bank loans for small- and medium-sized enterprises in the construction, agriculture, general merchandise, and trade sectors. IBEX is helping to raise funds and conduct crisis mitigation training to help local businesses to cope with the disruptive effects of the Ebola virus.

In 2013, IESC began a project with the AARP and the Chinese government to deploy senior business executive leaders as volunteer experts to China.

IESC celebrated its 50th anniversary at a reception in May 2014.
