= Viga =

Viga may refer to:

- Viga, Catanduanes, Philippines
- Viga (river), Russia
- Viga (architecture), a wooden beam characteristic of adobe buildings of the southwestern United States and northern Mexico
- La Viga metro station, in Mexico City, Mexico
- La Viga (Mexico City Metrobús), a BRT station in Mexico City
- La Viga (Mexibús), a BRT station in Ecatepec, State of Mexico

== See also ==
- Vega (disambiguation)
