= Brendan Brazier =

Canadian triathlete, publisher, writer, editor

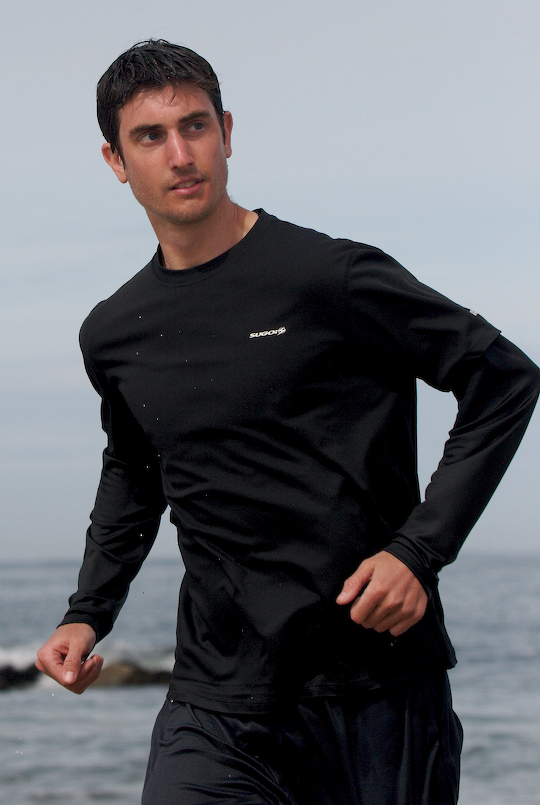
- Brazier in Venice Beach, CA

Personal information
- Nationality: Canadian
- Born: March 1, 1975 (age 50) Vancouver

Brendan Brazier (born March 1, 1975) is a Canadian former endurance athlete, author, advocate of a vegan diet, and creator of the Vega line of food products and supplements. Brazier is a former Ironman triathlete (1998 – 2004). He is the author of The Thrive Diet (2007), Thrive Fitness (2009), and Thrive Foods: 200 Plant-Based Recipes for Peak Health (2011).

Brazier was the winner of the Canadian 50k division of the Harriers Elk/Beaver National Ultramarathon Championships in 2003 and the 50 km division of the Toronto Ultra Race in 2006.

Brazier has promoted a vegan diet known as The Thrive Diet which promotes plant-based whole foods and recommends that foods be consumed raw or cooked at using only low temperatures.

== Selected publications ==
- The Thrive Diet: The Whole Food Way to Lose Weight, Reduce Stress, and Stay Healthy for Life (17 December 2007) Da Capo Lifelong Books.
- Thrive: The Vegan Nutrition Guide to Optimal Performance in Sports and Life (23 December 2008) Da Capo Lifelong Books.
- Thrive Fitness: The Vegan-Based Training Program for Maximum Strength, Health, and Fitness (8 December 2009) Da Capo Lifelong Books.
- Thrive Foods: 200 Plant-Based Recipes for Peak Health (6 September 2011) Da Capo Lifelong Books. Also, published as-
- Whole Foods to Thrive: Nutrient-Dense, Plant-Based Recipes for Peak Health (May 10, 2011) Penguin Canada.
- Thrive Energy Cookbook: 150 Plant-Based Whole Food Recipes (4 March 2014) Da Capo Lifelong Books.
- Thrive Fitness, 2nd Edition: The Program for Peak Mental and Physical Strength—Fueled by Clean, Plant-based, Whole Food Recipes (29 December 2015) Da Capo Lifelong Books.
- Thrive, 10th Anniversary Edition: The Plant-Based Whole Foods Way to Staying Healthy for Life (14 February 2017) Da Capo Lifelong Books.

== See also ==
- Vegan nutrition
