= Bega (surname) =

Bega is a surname. Notable people with the surname include:

- Alessandro Bega (born 1991), Italian tennis player
- Cornelis Pietersz Bega (died 1664), Dutch painter
- Francesco Bega (born 1974), Italian footballer
- Leslie Bega (born 1967), American actress
- Lou Bega (born 1975), German pop singer
- Saint Bega, probably mythical Irish princess
