= Vega (company) =

Brand of vegan products

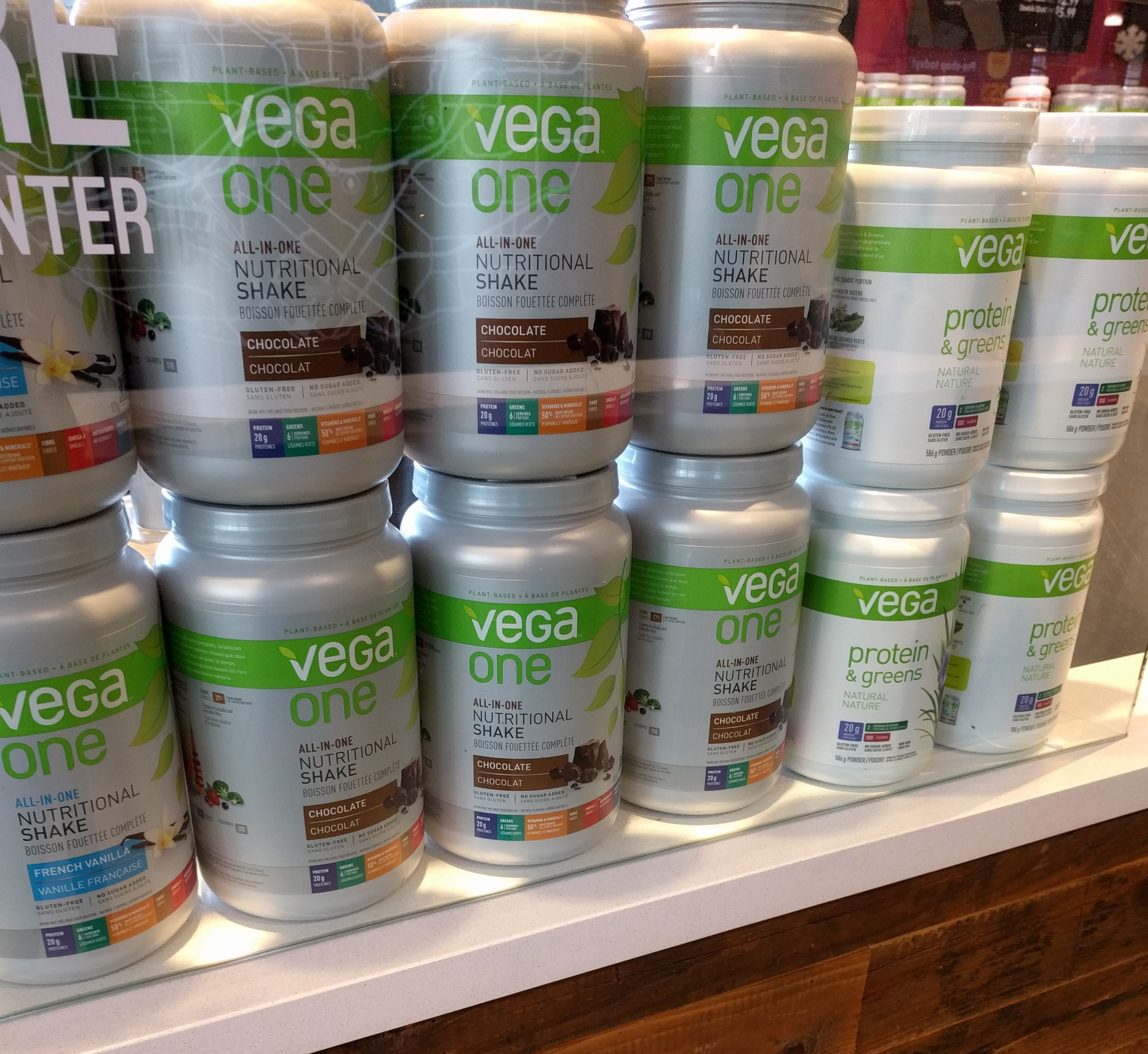
- Product type: Vegan protein powder, protein bars
- Current owner: WM Partners
- Country: U.S.
- Introduced: 2001; 25 years ago
- Previous owners: Danone
- Website: myvega.com

Vega is a brand of plant based nutritional products. The company was started in Burnaby by Charles Chang and Brendan Brazier in 2004. In 2015, Vega was sold to Denver-based giant Whitewave Foods for US$550 million.

In 2021 Vega brand was disposed from Danone and sold to WM Partners.

== Products ==
The Vega line of products includes vegan protein powder, protein bars, protein snacks, protein shakes, and supplements. Their products are all vegan certified and Non-GMO Project verified. Vega products predominantly use pea based protein instead of the typical dairy based whey protein used in most supplemental protein products.

The Vega Protein with Greens comes in seven different flavours while offering 20 grams of plant based protein, veggies and green daily servings.
