= Volunteers for Economic Growth Alliance =

Volunteers for Economic Growth Alliance (VEGA) was an umbrella group consisting of 23 economic development organizations that integrate highly skilled volunteers into programs. VEGA is usually contracted by United States Agency for International Development (USAID) for specific projects that involve one or more of the Member organizations. The organization was headquartered in Washington, DC and its members have offices around the world in developing/transitioning economies where USAID operates.

The Alliance manages programs across the developing world.

== History ==
VEGA was founded in 2004 as a procurement partner based on a call from United States Agency for International Development for a consortium to coordinate volunteers into economic growth programs.

== Member organizations ==
These are all typically US-based, economic development NGOs.

- ACDI/VOCA
- Aid to Artisans / Creative Learning
- CNFA
- Coffee Quality Institute
- CRDF Global
- Cuso International
- EMDAP IIE/Emerging Markets Development Advisor Program
- FSVC Financial Services Volunteer Corps
- FAVACA Florida Association for Volunteer Action in the Caribbean and the Americas
- Global Business School Network
- ICMA International City/County Management Association
- IESC
- IRPF International Real Property Foundation
- ISLP International Senior Lawyers Project
- Land O'Lakes International Development
- Mennonite Economic Development Association (MEDA)
- National Cooperative Business Association's Cooperative League of the USA International Program (NCBA-CLUSA)
- OICI International
- Partners of the Americas
- PYXERA Global
- SAVE Travel Alliance
- Sustainable Travel International
- Winrock International
