= Vega, Sweden =

Coordinates: 59°11′25″N 18°7′39″E

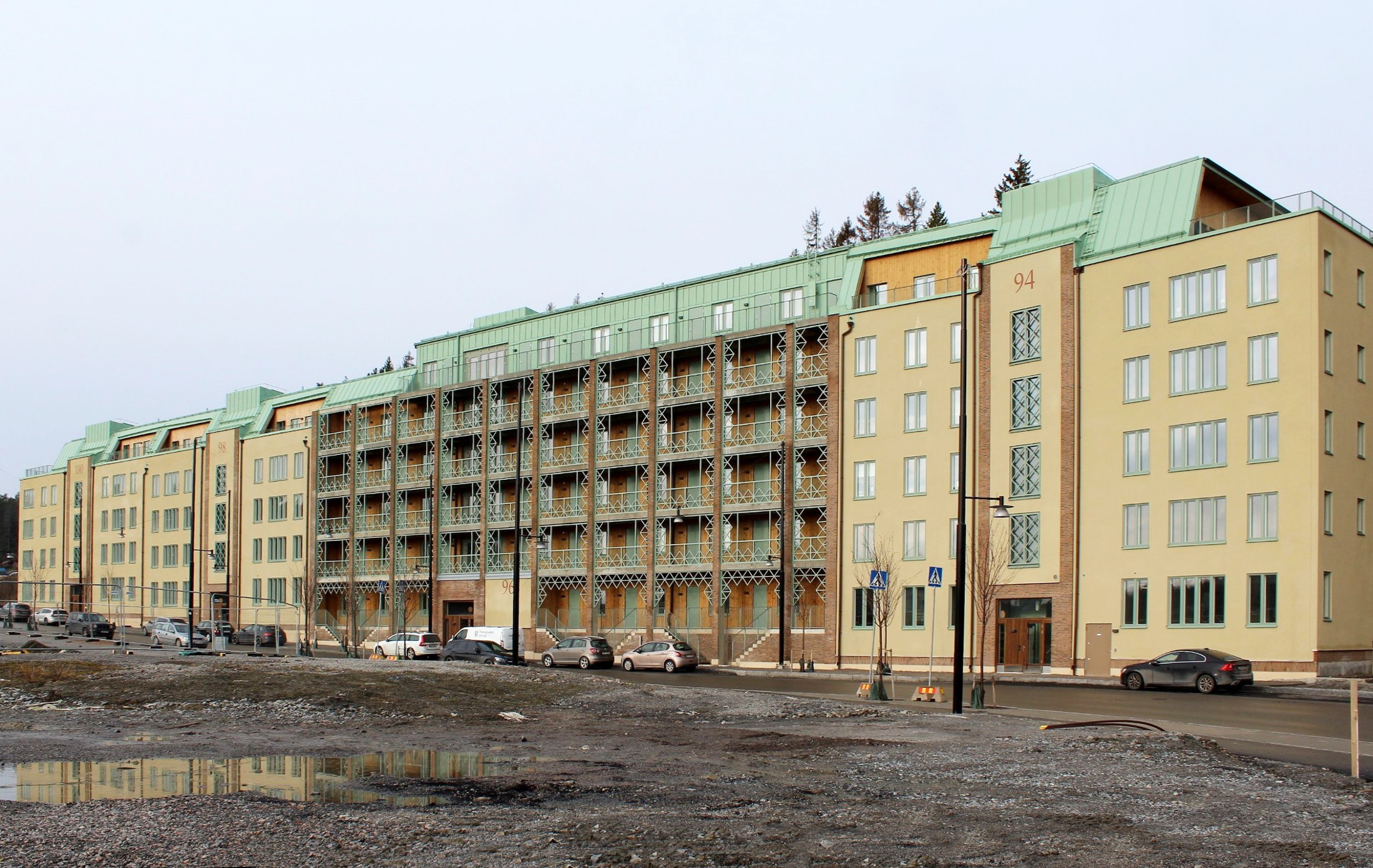
- Country: Sweden
- County: Stockholm County
- Municipality: Haninge Municipality
- Established: 2007

Population (2018)
  - Total: 6,590
- Time zone: UTC+1 (CET)
  - Summer (DST): UTC+2 (CEST)
- Website: https://www.haninge.se/bygga-bo-och-miljo/oversiktsplanering-och-detaljplaner/byggprojekt/vega-stadsdel/om-vega/

Vega is a town district in Haninge Municipality, in Sweden. As of 2017, Vega has a population of 6,033 people. It is located north of Handen and is part of Stockholm.

As of 2019, Vega is being redeveloped with more than 3,000 planned homes. Vega railway station on the Stockholm commuter rail system opened on 1 April 2019.

== Gallery ==
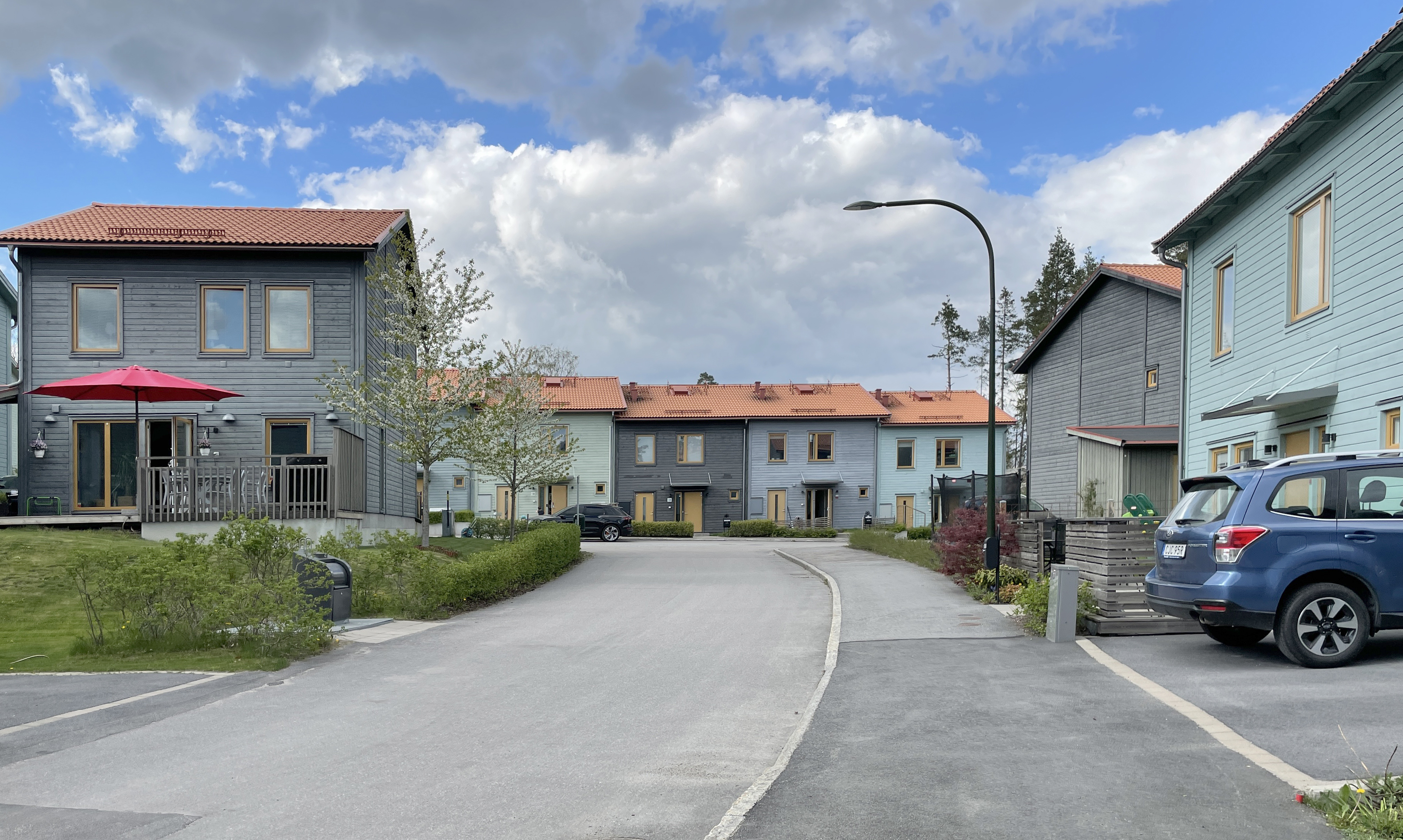
Housing in Vega

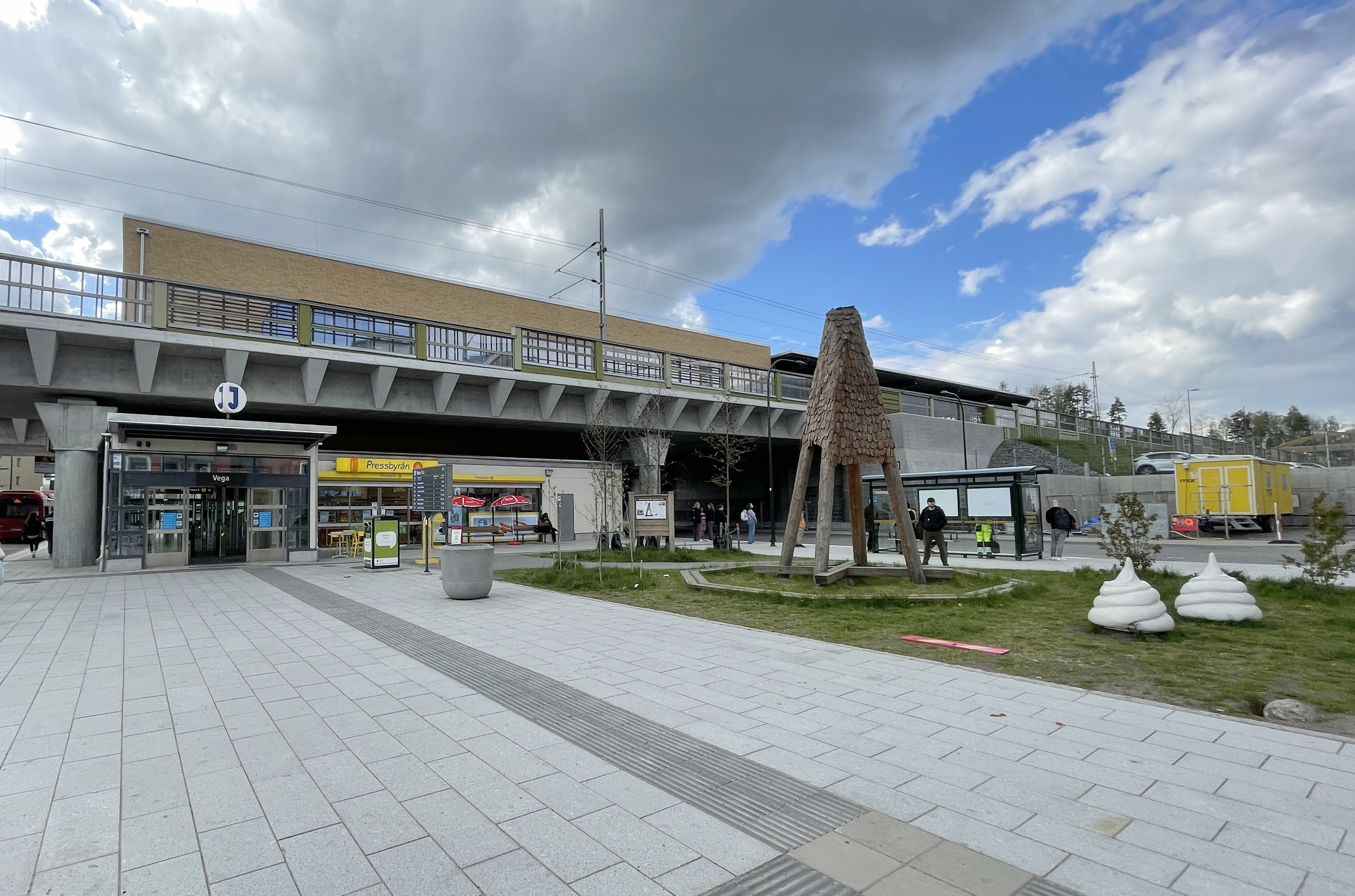
Vega railway station

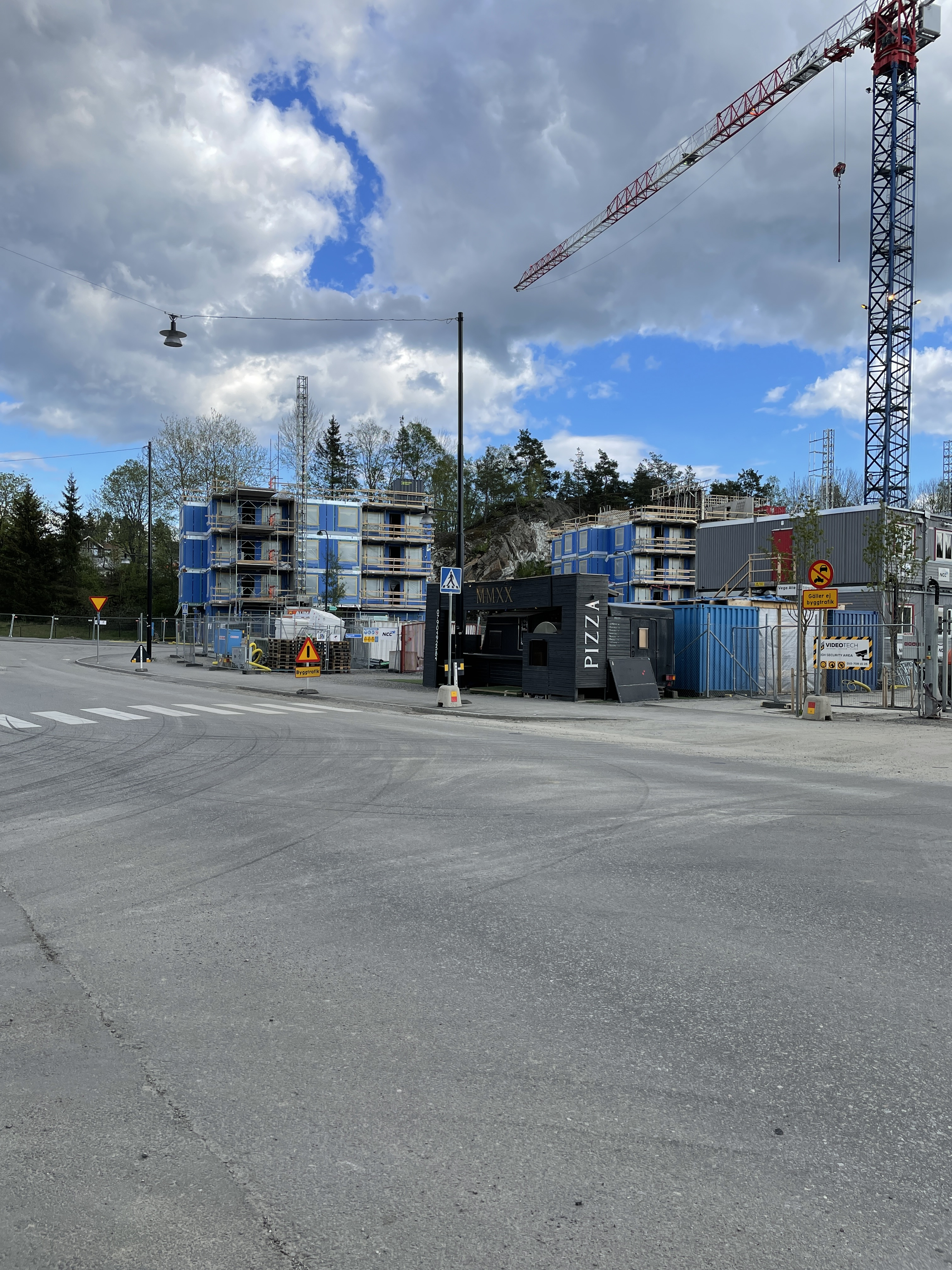
Construction of Housing

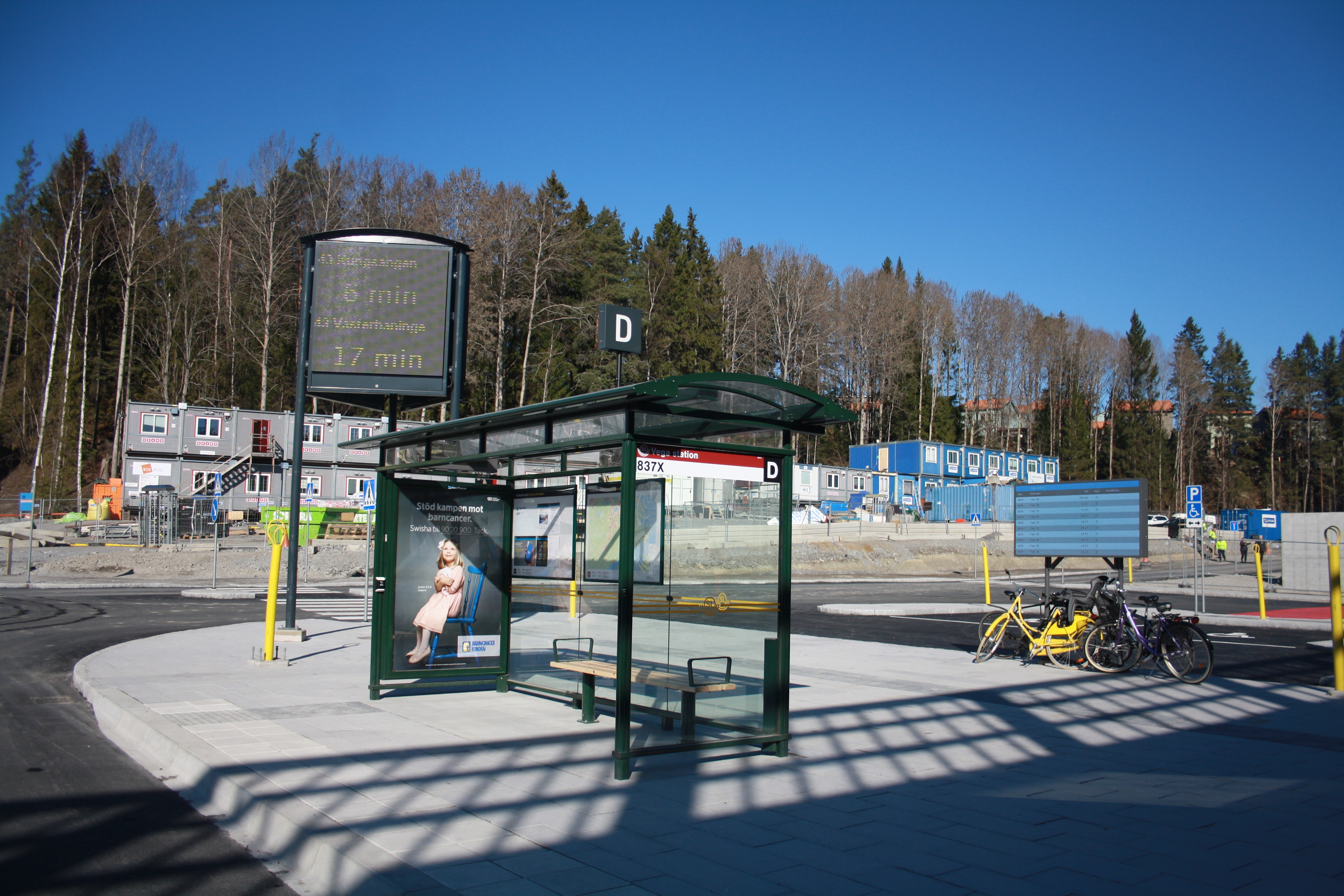
Bus Stop in Vega
