= Vega railway station =

Railway station in Haninge Municipality, Sweden

Coordinates: 59.1868°N 18.1358°E

Vega
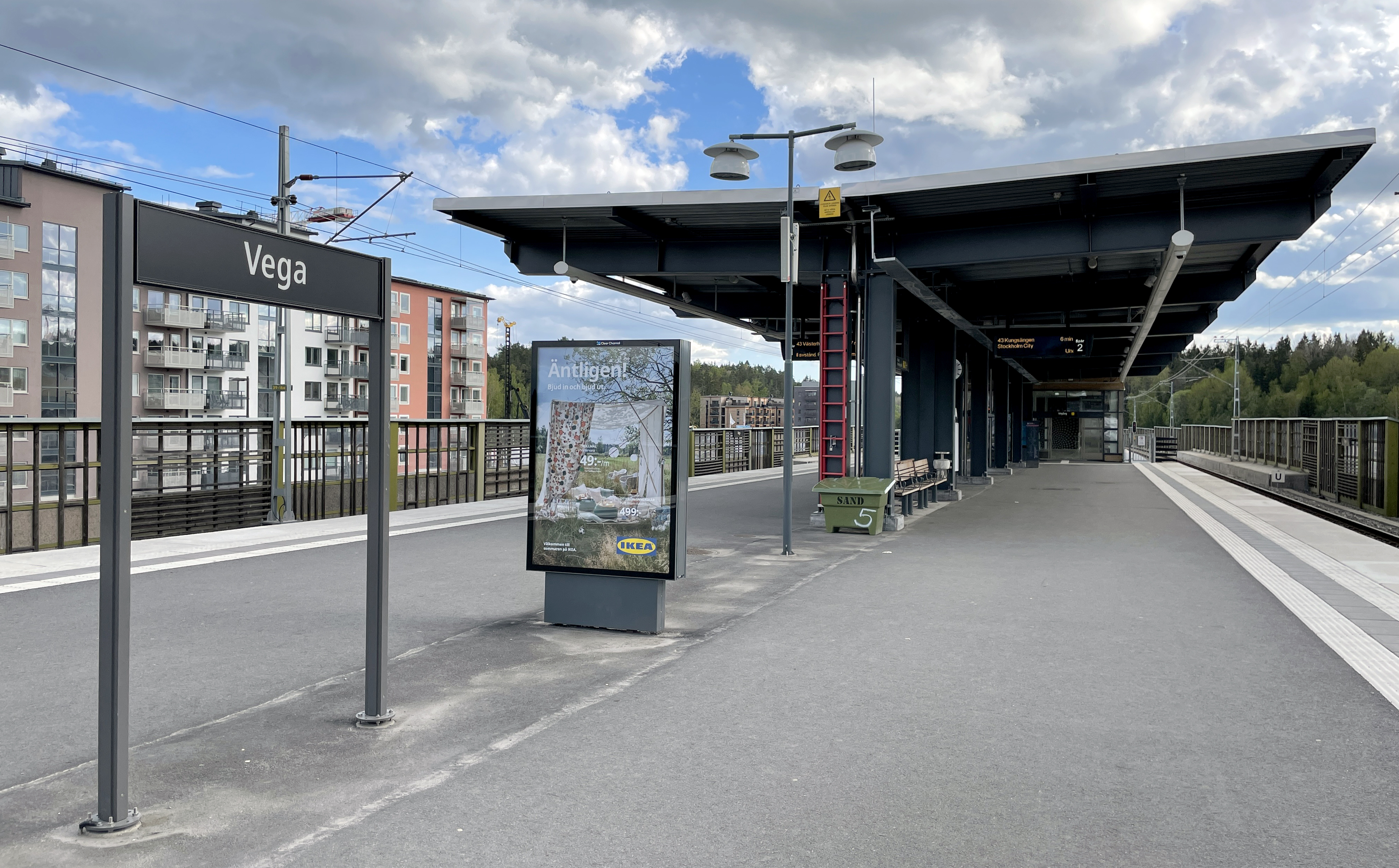
- Vega station in 2021

General information
- Location: Vega, Haninge, Sweden
- System: Pendeltåg
- Platforms: Island

History
- Opened: 2019

Passengers
- 2019: 1,200 boarding per weekday (commuter rail)

Services
Preceding station	Stockholm commuter rail	Following station
Handen towards Bålsta	43	Skogås towards Nynäshamn
Location

Vega is a station on the Stockholm commuter train network, located in the neighbourhood of Vega within Haninge municipality on the Nynäs line.

The station opened in April 2019, and was built in conjunction with the development of the surrounding area. It is located between the stations Skogås and Handen, and has a central island platform. The ticket hall is located at the southern end of the station and preparations have been made for an entrance also at the northern end.

The station has a normal weekday about 1700 boarding passengers, and it is anticipated that once Vega district is fully developed, there will be approximately 4200 boarding passengers each day. About 90 parking spaces for have been created, and bicycle parking is available, opposite the station entrance.

Travel time between Vega station and Stockholm City is approximately 25 minutes. At the station there is an artistic decoration Flos Solis Maior by artist Ulla Fredriksson.

== Connecting transport ==
Vega station is also served by a number of SL's bus lines.

== History ==
=== Previous station ===
Between 1929 and 1973, there was a small stop called Vega on the then-single track Nynäs line; however this was in a different location from the current station.

=== Current station ===
Construction of the new station was started on 5 May 2015, with traffic starting on 1 April 2019.

== Gallery ==
=== Exterior ===
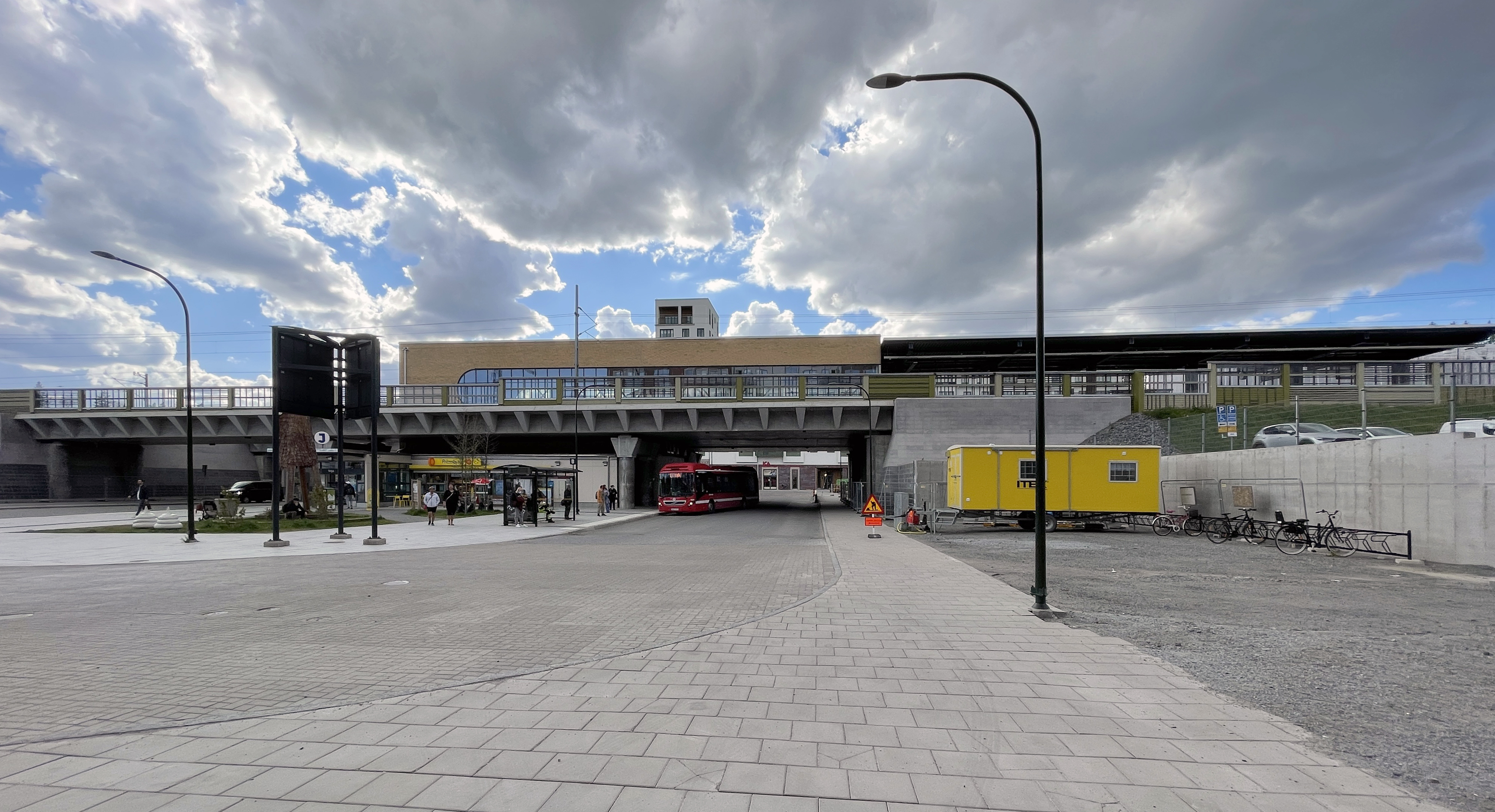

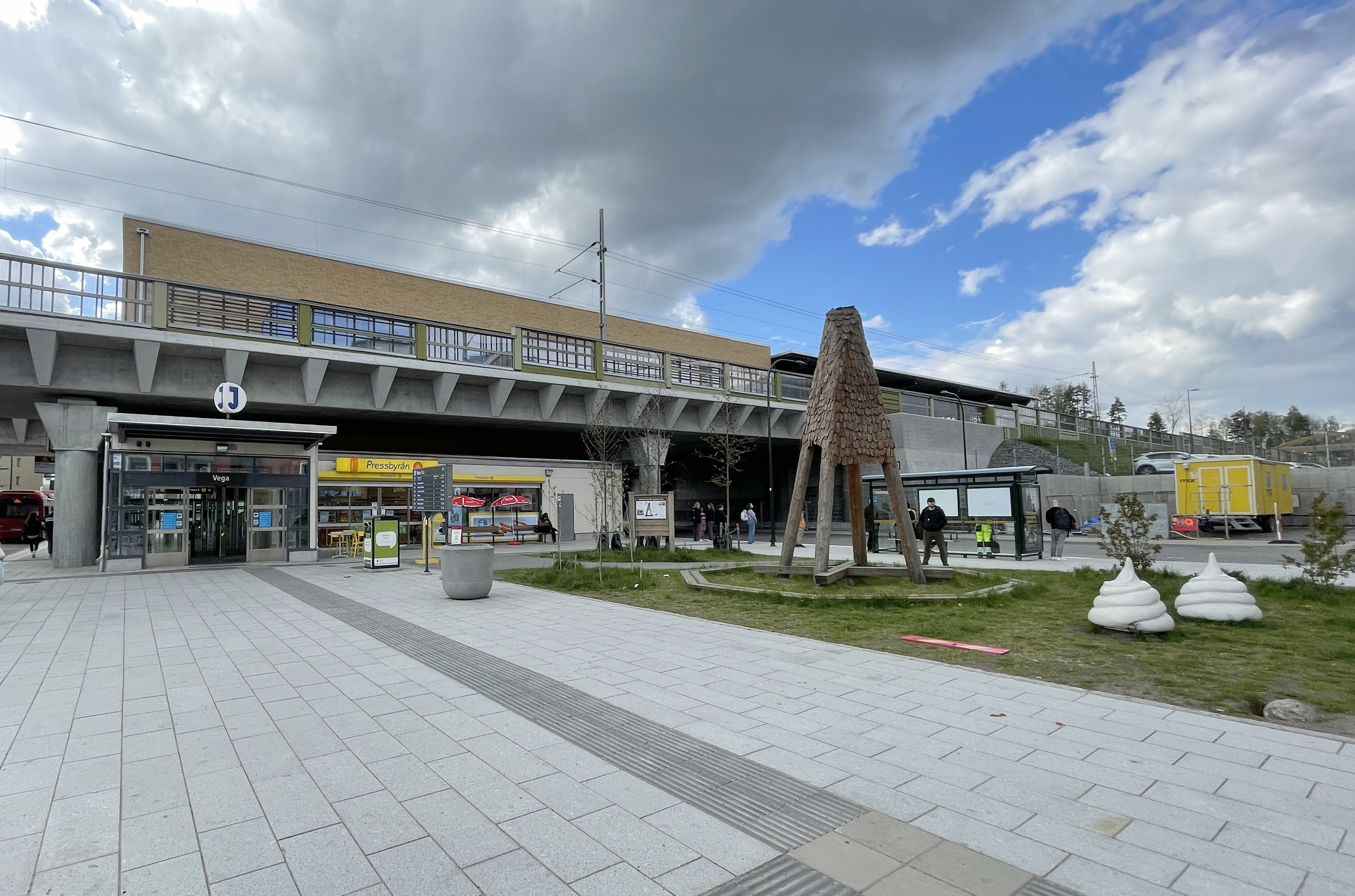

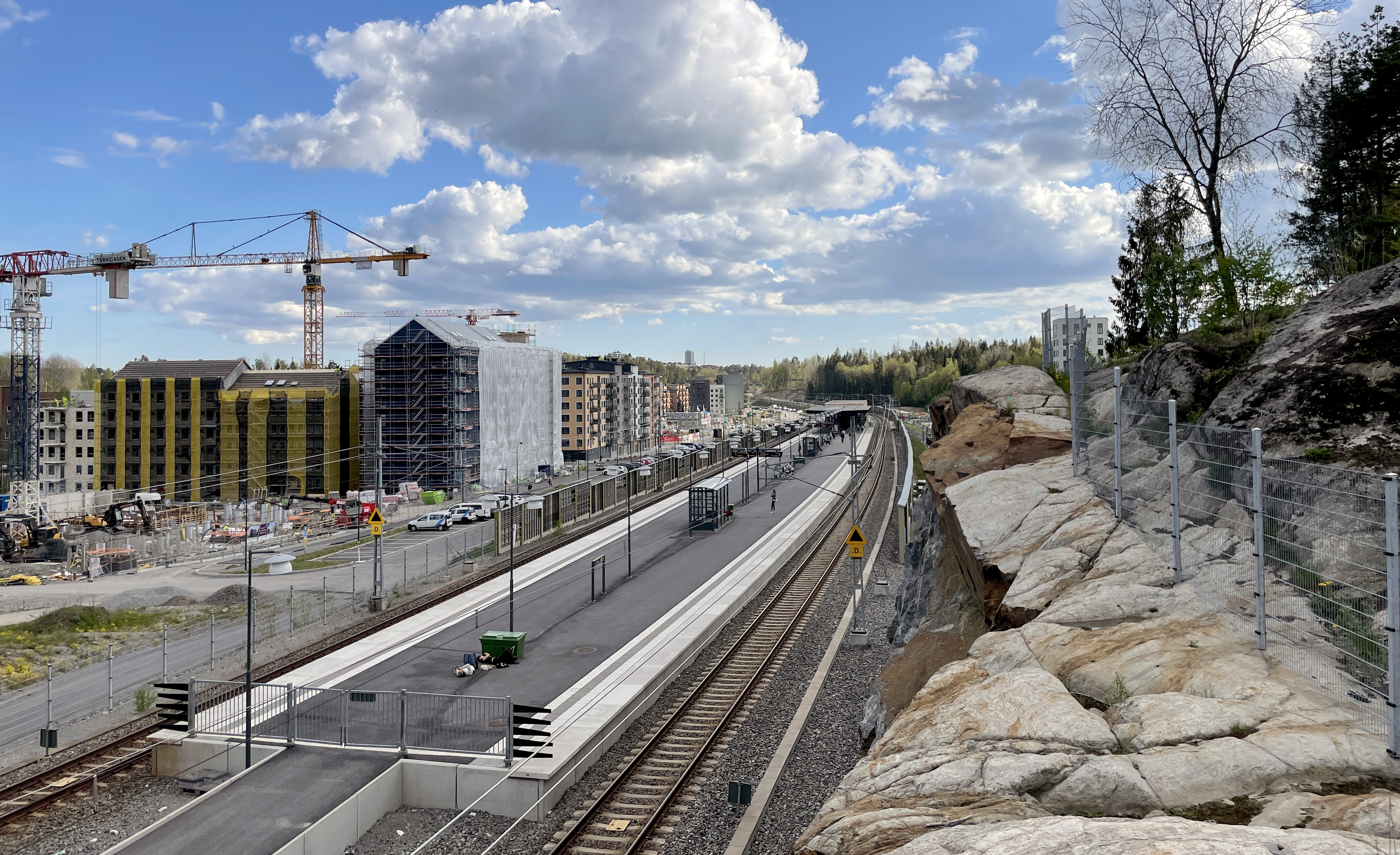

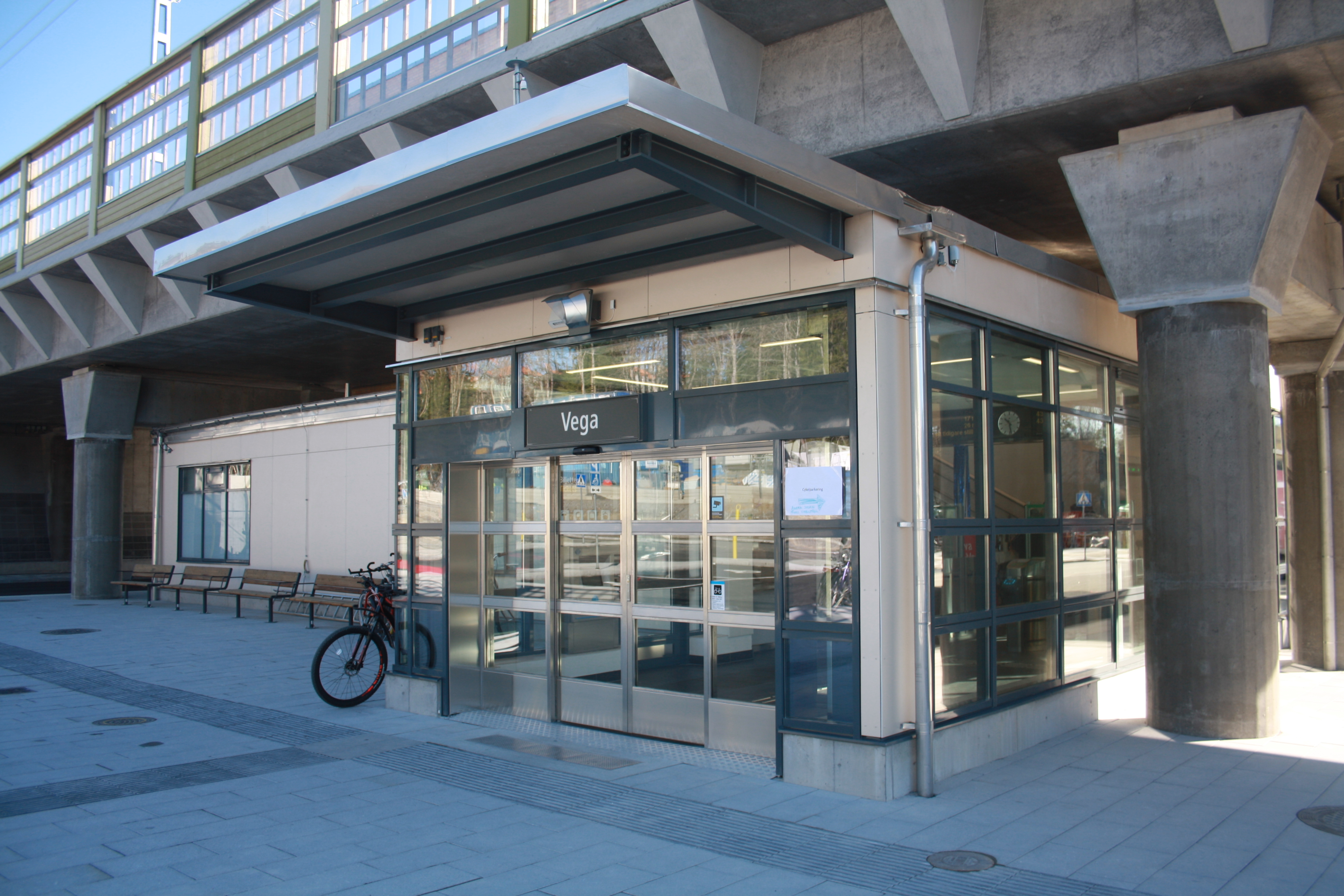

=== Interior ===
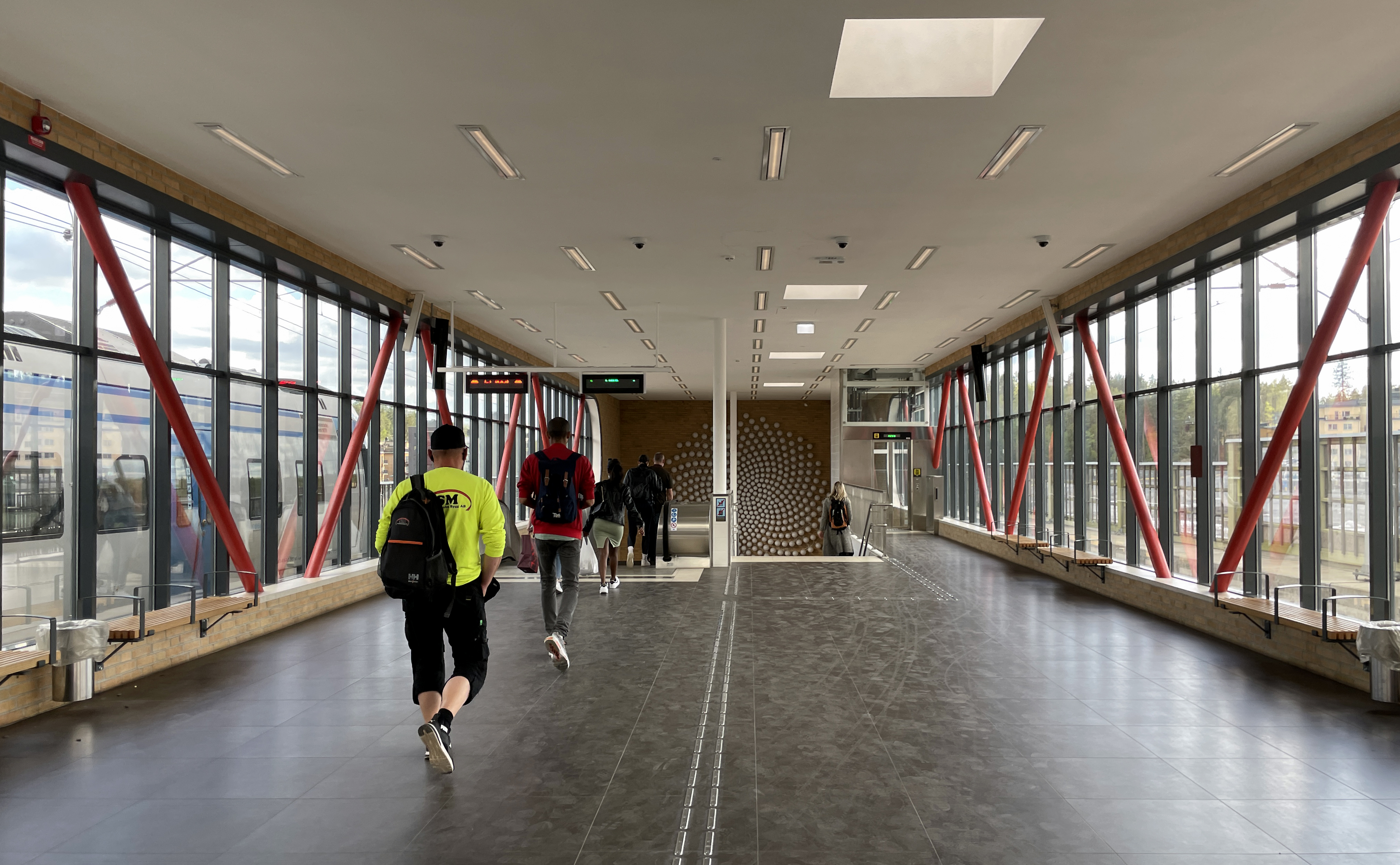

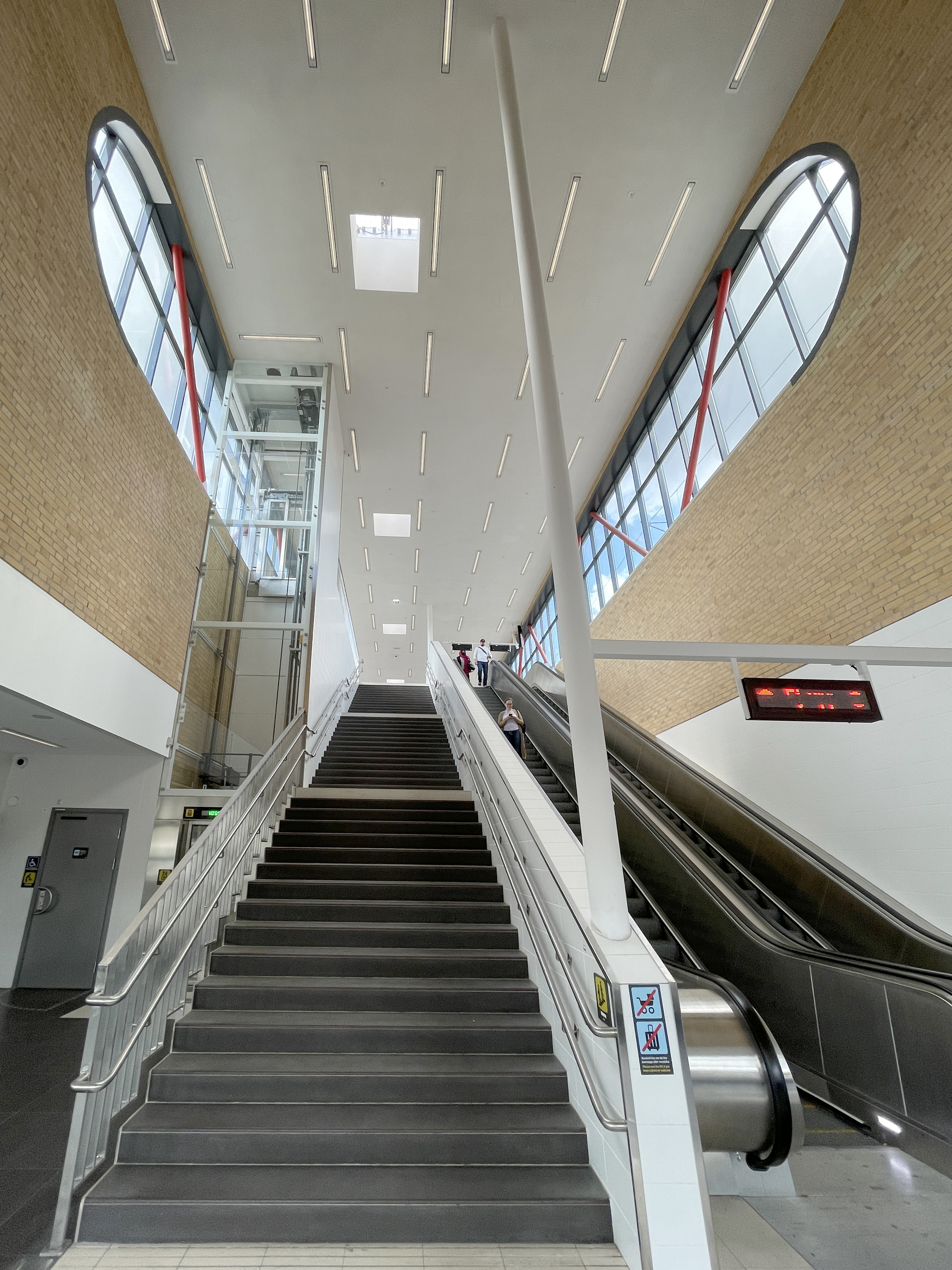

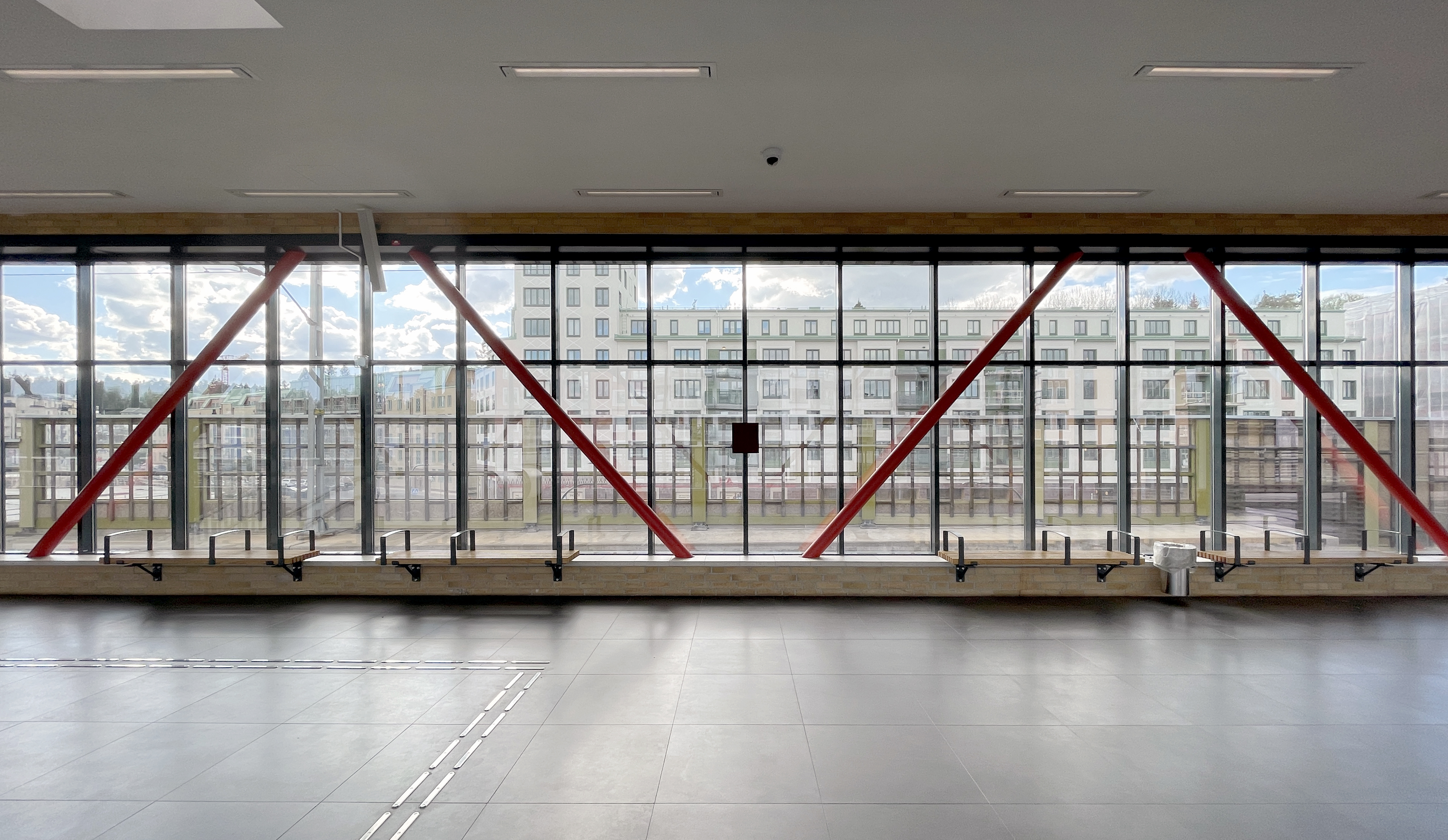

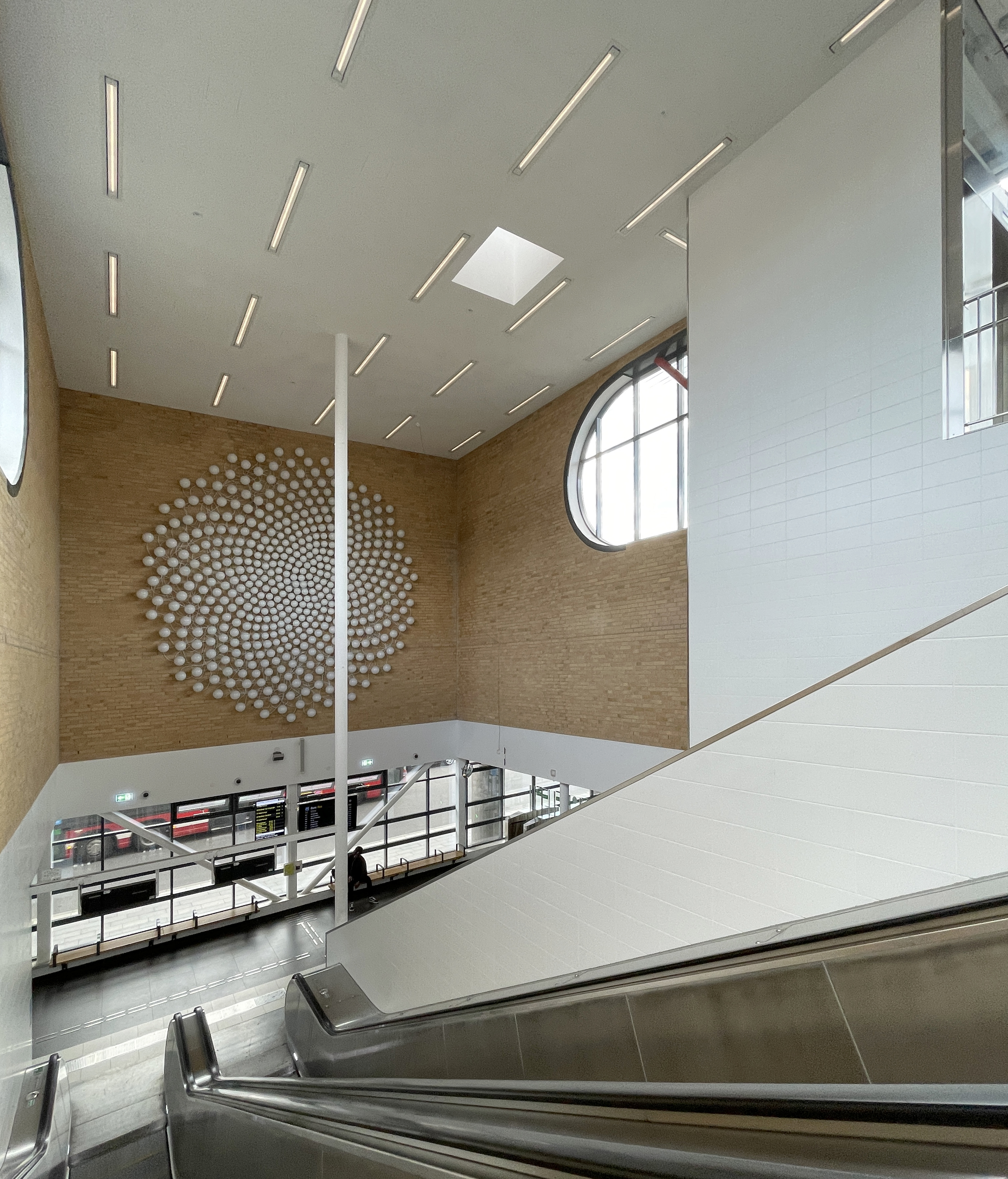

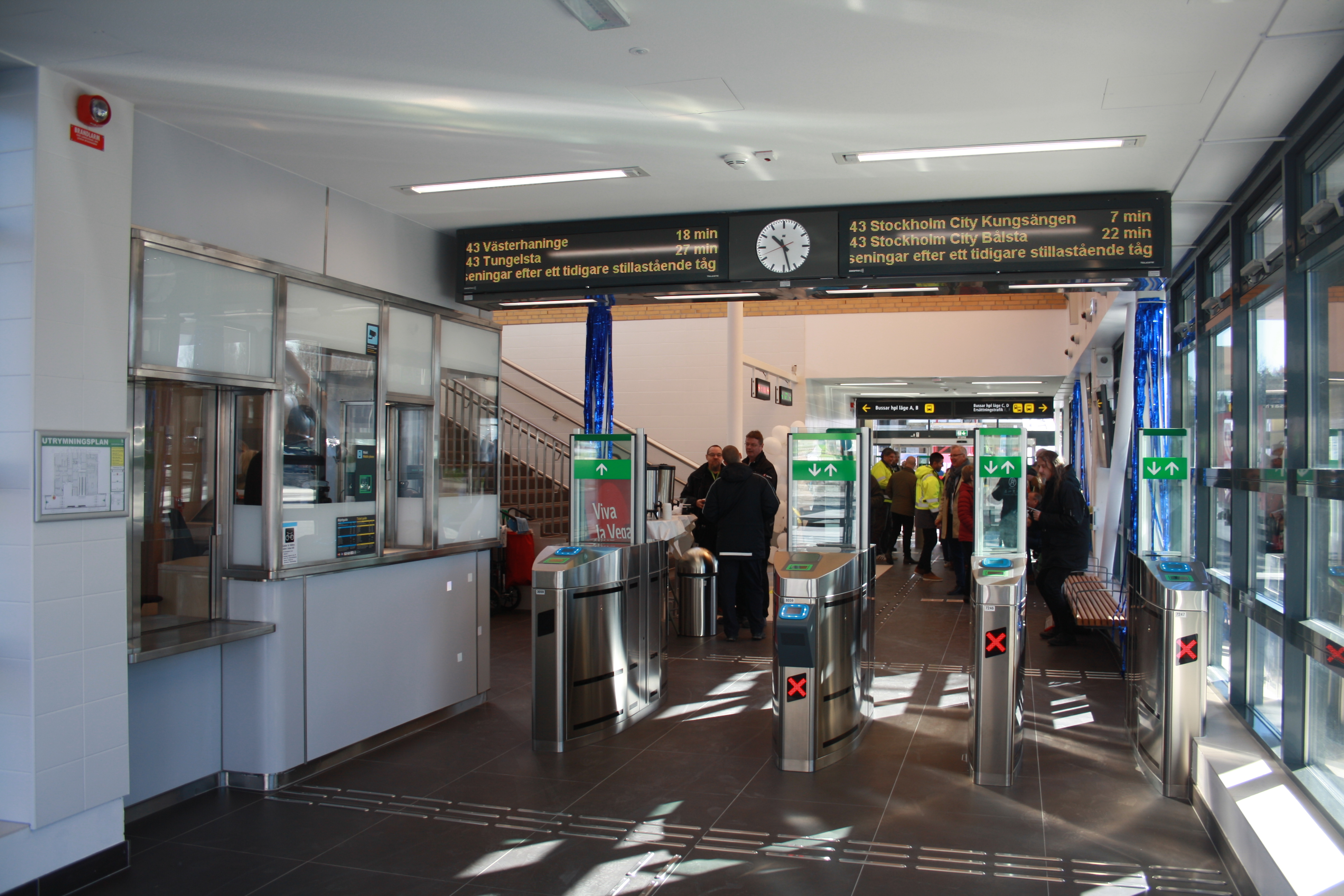

=== Platform ===
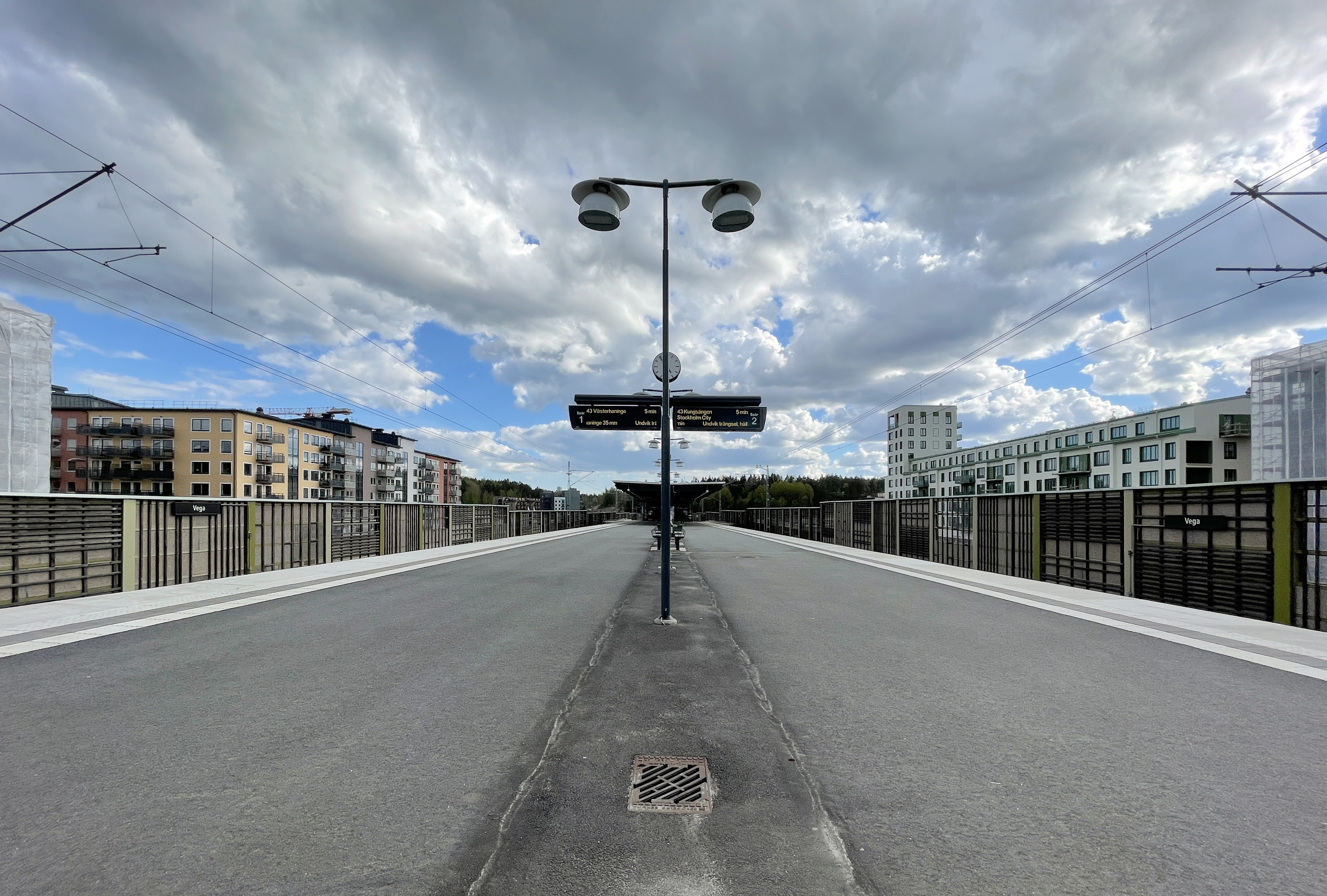

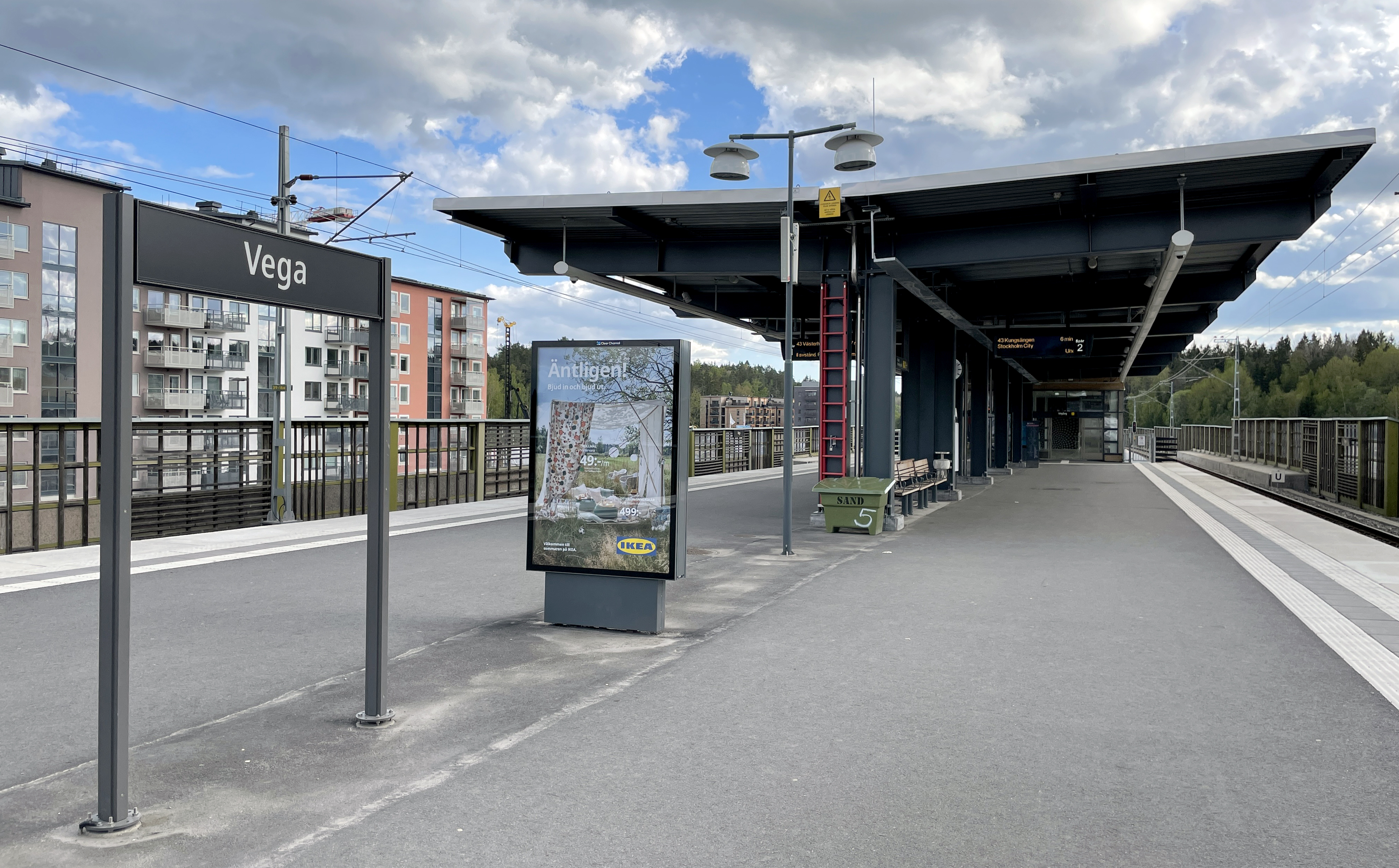

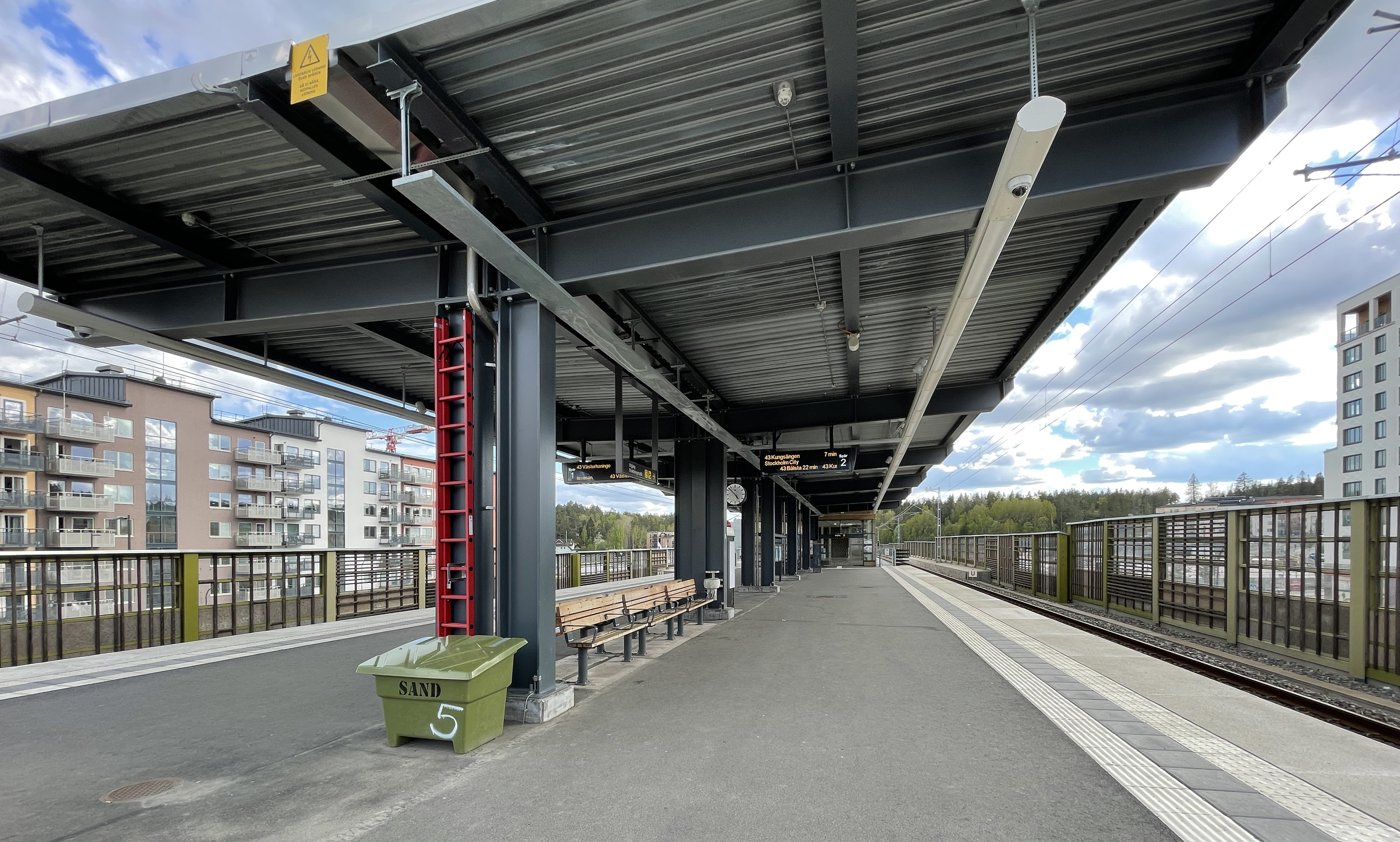

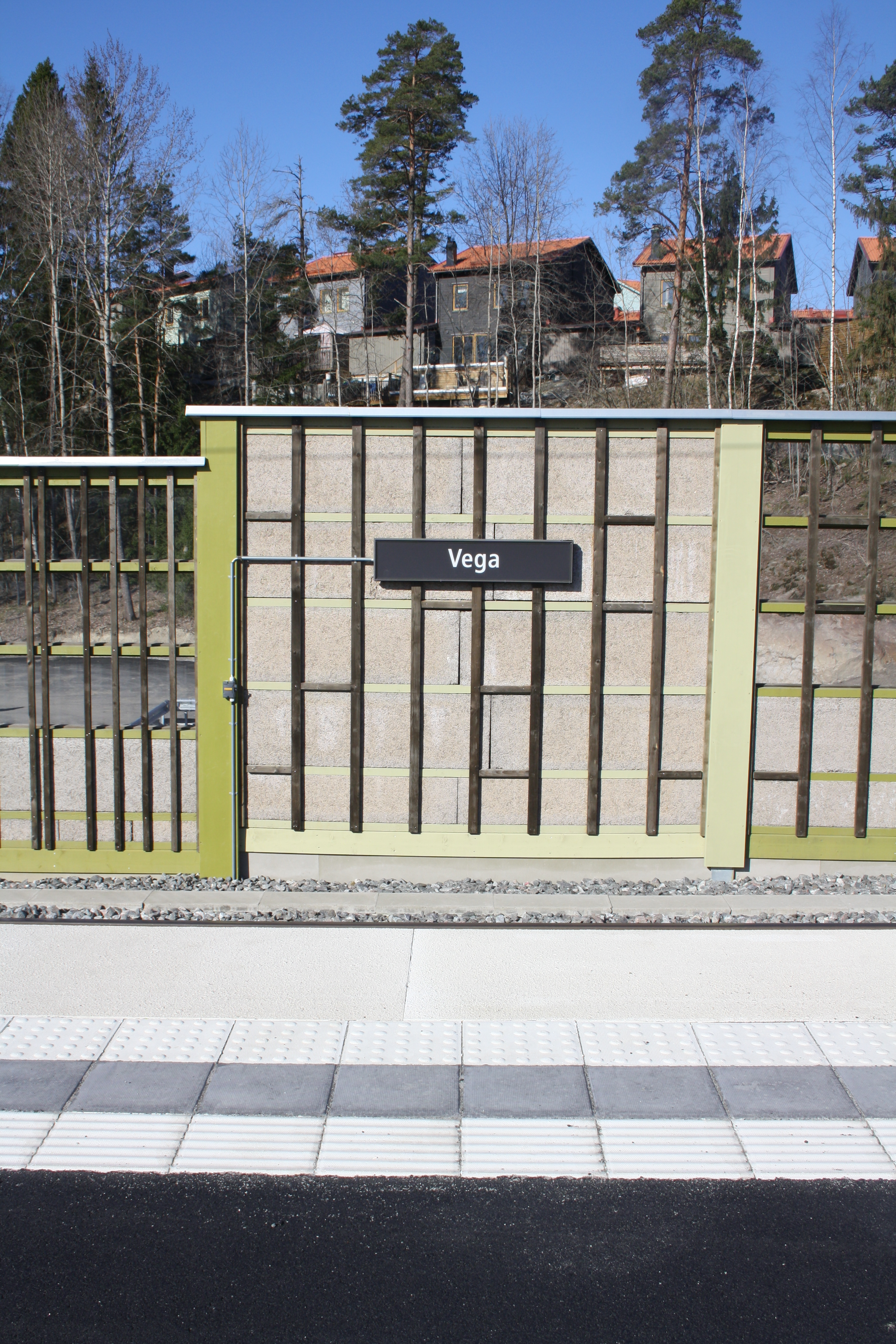
