= Bega (Dörentrup) =

Coordinates: 52.005°N 9.065°E

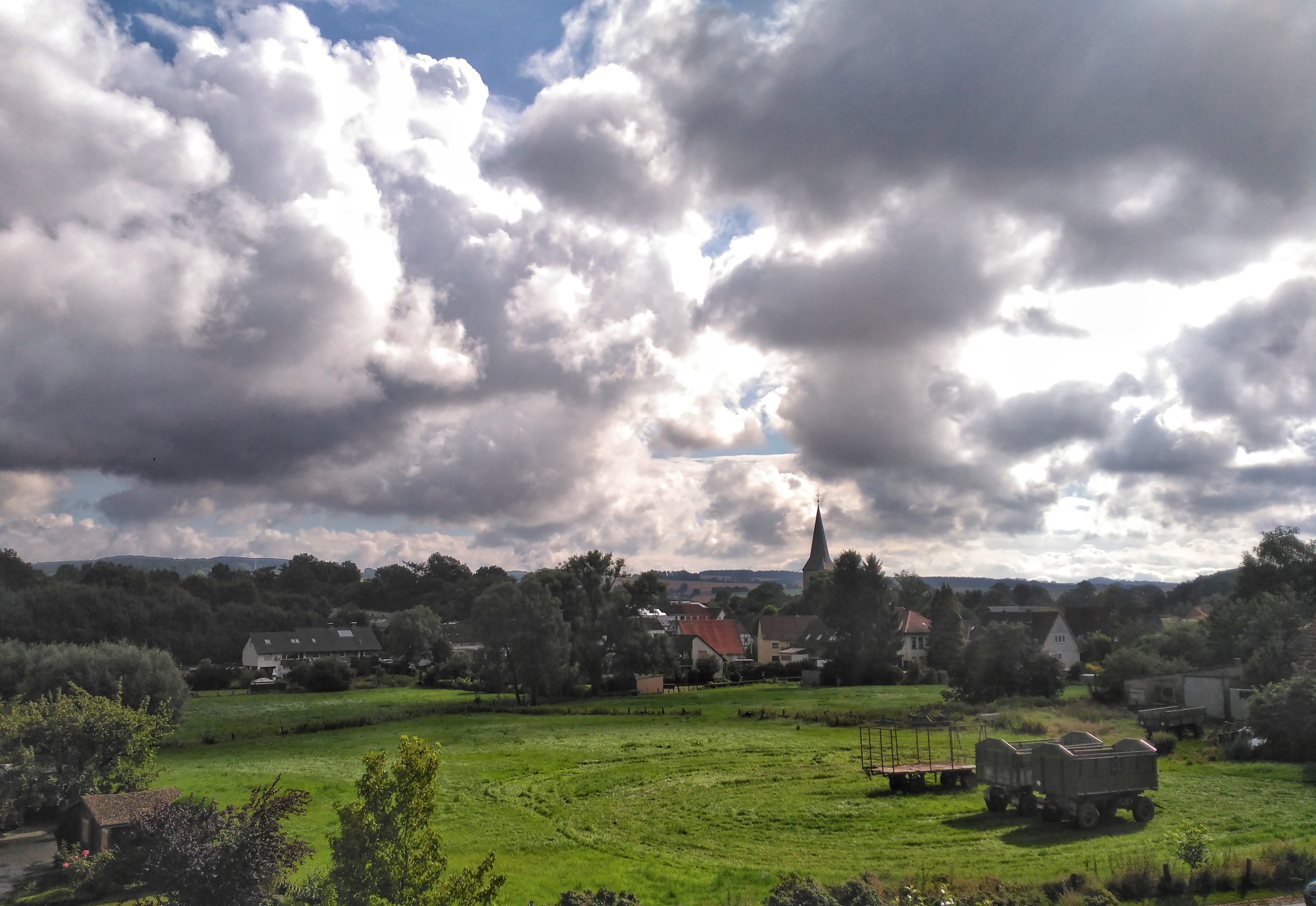
Landscape in Bega

Bega is a small village belonging to the municipality of Dörentrup in Lippe district, Nordrhein-Westfalen, Germany.

Its name comes from the river Bega, that crosses the village. It has 1392 inhabitants.
