= Seasons of Ethiopia =

Overview of seasons in Ethiopia

Köppen climate classification of climate of Ethiopia

The seasons of Ethiopia consist of four phases: Mekher (Amharic: መኸር, Oromo: Birraa, equivalent to Spring) lasting from September to November, Bega (Amharic: በጋ, Oromo: bona, equivalent to Summer) from December to February, Belg (Amharic: በልግ) or Tsedey (Amharic: ጸደይ) (Oromo: Afraasaa, equivalent to Autumn) from March to May and Kiremt (Amharic: ክረምት, Oromo: ganna, equivalent to Winter) from June to August. The most dry and cold season is Bega/Summer, while Kiremt/Winter is extremely rainy and when 85% to 95% of food crops are produced.

== Seasons ==
Ethiopia has four distinct seasons that are locally known as Mekher(መኸር) or Metsew(መፀው), Bega(በጋ) or Hagay(ሐጋይ), Tsedey(ጸደይ) or Belg (በልግ), and Kremt (ክረምት) . The southern part of the country and southern lowlands have rainfall periods from March to May and from September to November. The two cropping seasons in Bale Highlands are called the Ganna (March to June) and Bona (July to December) seasons.

=== Bega ===
Bega is the dry season from December to January. Bega consists of mostly hot days and cool nights. Frost arrives every morning accompanied over most the Ethiopian Highlands areas.

=== Belg ===
Belg is a short rainy season in most parts of Ethiopia. From March to May, rainfall is highly variable and high maximum temperatures are common.

In this season, adequate rain in March may help farmers to plant short cycle crops, such as barley, wheat and teff. In most parts of Somali Region erratic and low rain falls during March, especially in southern parts where pasture and water are already scarce. According to the European Commission and World Food Programme, 490,000 MT of cereals (maize, sorghum and wheat) could be purchased on the domestic market for food aid in Ethiopia in 2002.

=== Kiremt ===
Kiremt is the rainy season when 85% to 95% of food crops are produced. Covering from June to August, the season is marked by frequent rains and homogeneous temperatures.
