= Segersäng railway station =

Railway station in Nynäshamn, Sweden

Segersäng
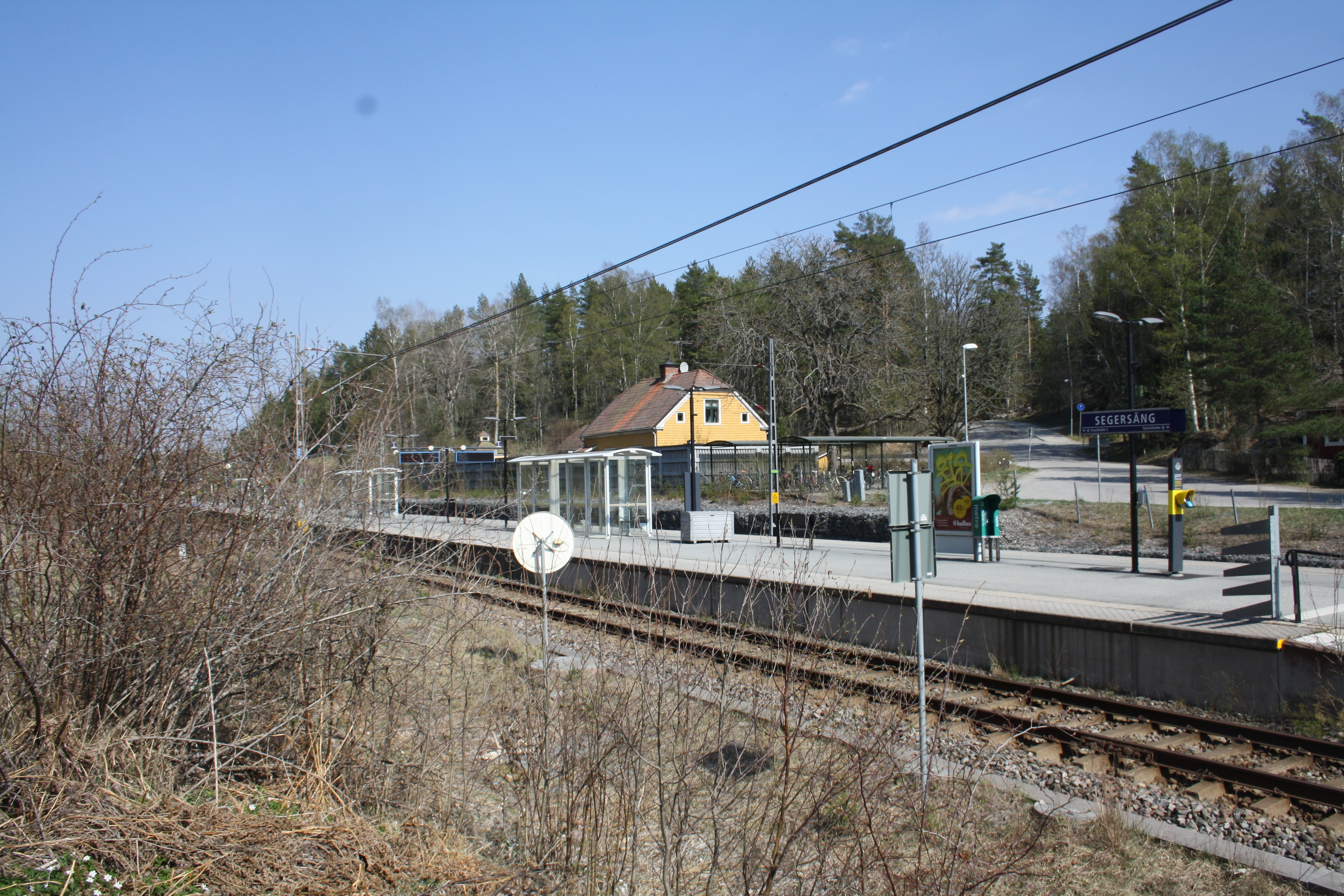
- Segersäng station in 2019

General information
- Location: Stockholm County
- Coordinates: 59°1′45″N 17°55′37″E
- System: Pendeltåg
- Owner: Swedish Transport Administration
- Platforms: 1 Island Platform
- Tracks: 2

Construction
- Structure type: At-grade

Other information
- Station code: Ssä

History
- Opened: 1901
- Rebuilt: 2008
- Former names: Sorunda (until 1917)

Passengers
- 2015: 300 boarding per weekday (commuter rail)

Services
Preceding station	Stockholm commuter rail	Following station
Hemfosa towards Bålsta	43	Ösmo towards Nynäshamn
Location

Segersäng is a station on Stockholm's commuter rail network, located in the locality of Segersäng within Nynäshamn Municipality on the Nynäs Line. The station has a single island platform and no ticket barriers. As of 2015, the station had approximately 300 boarding passengers per weekday. During peak hours, SL bus line 850 provides connections from Segersäng to Grödby and Trollsta Vägskäl.

== History ==
The station was originally opened in 1901 under the name "Sorunda," but it was renamed "Segersäng" in 1917. In 2008, the station was relocated approximately 100 meters to its current position and was upgraded to serve as a passing loop on the single-track section of the Nynäs Line.

== Gallery ==
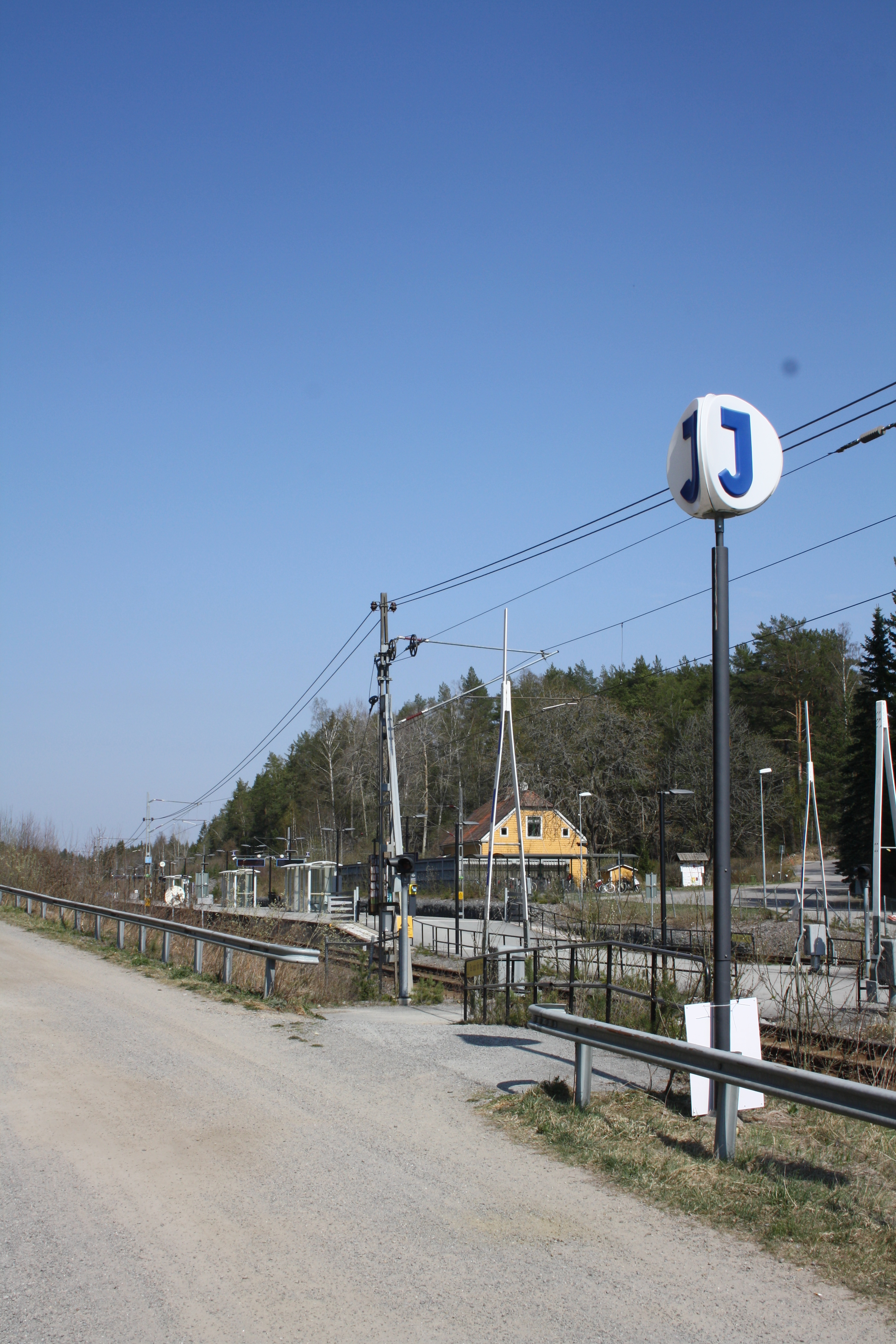
Station entrance

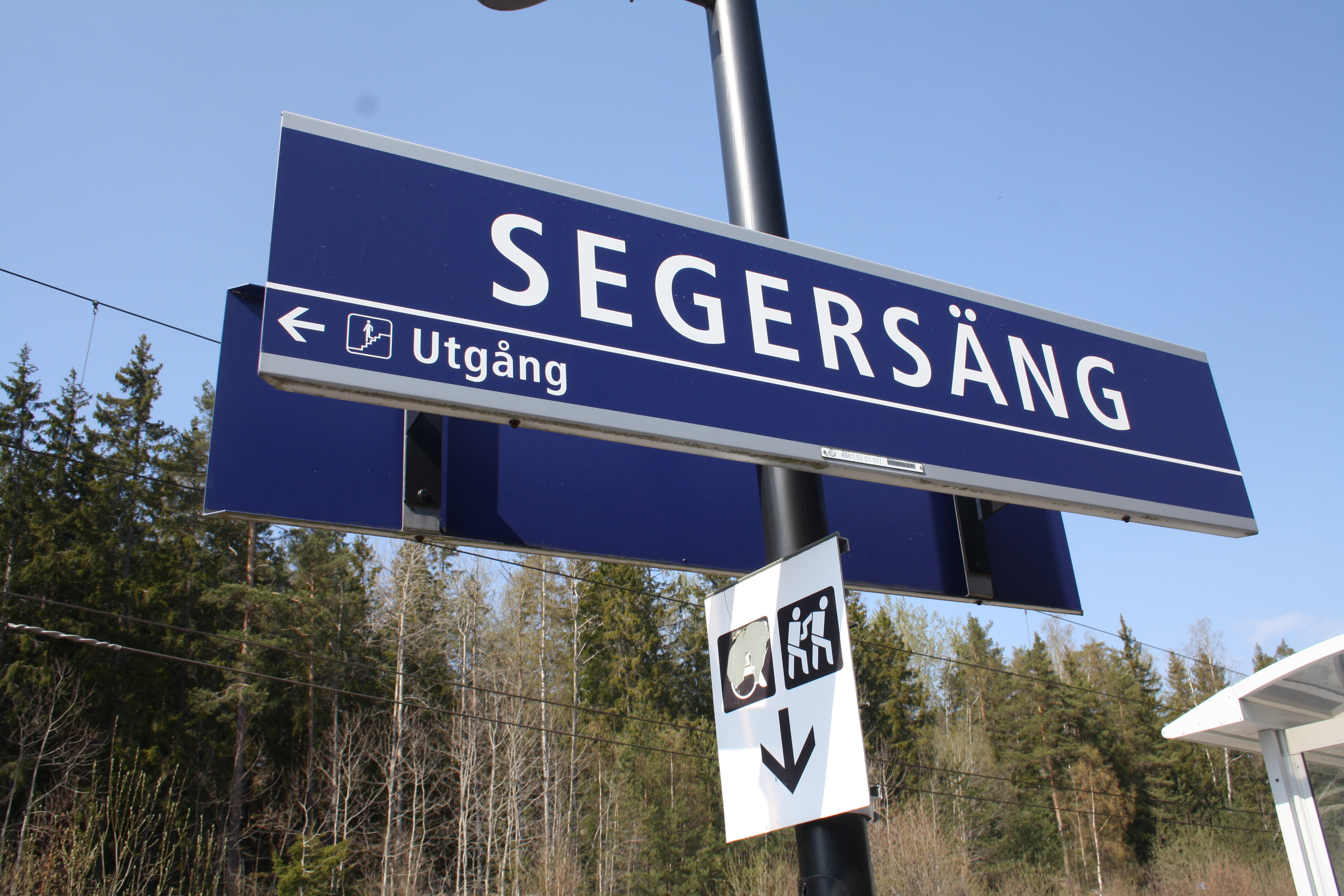
Station sign

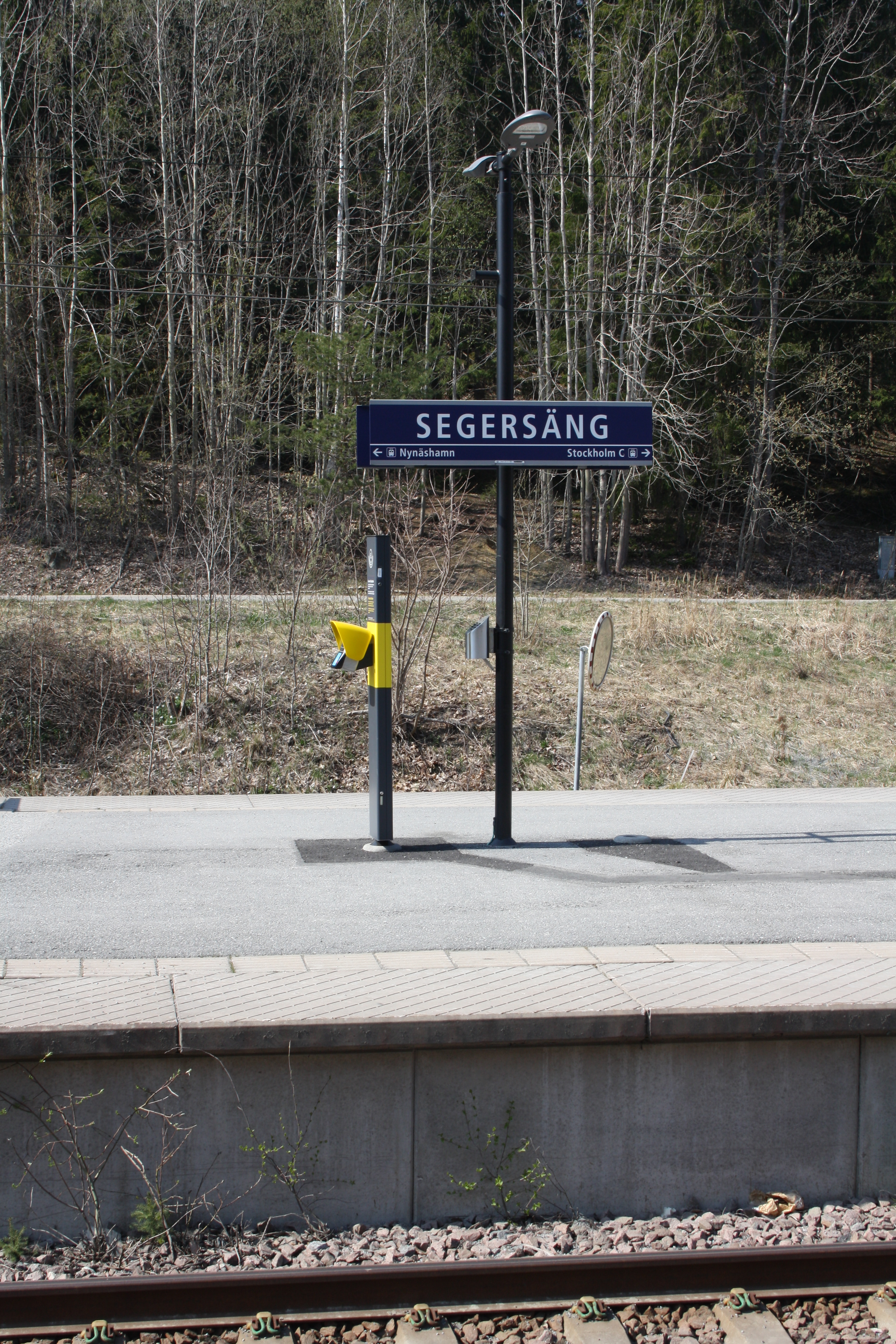
View of the station

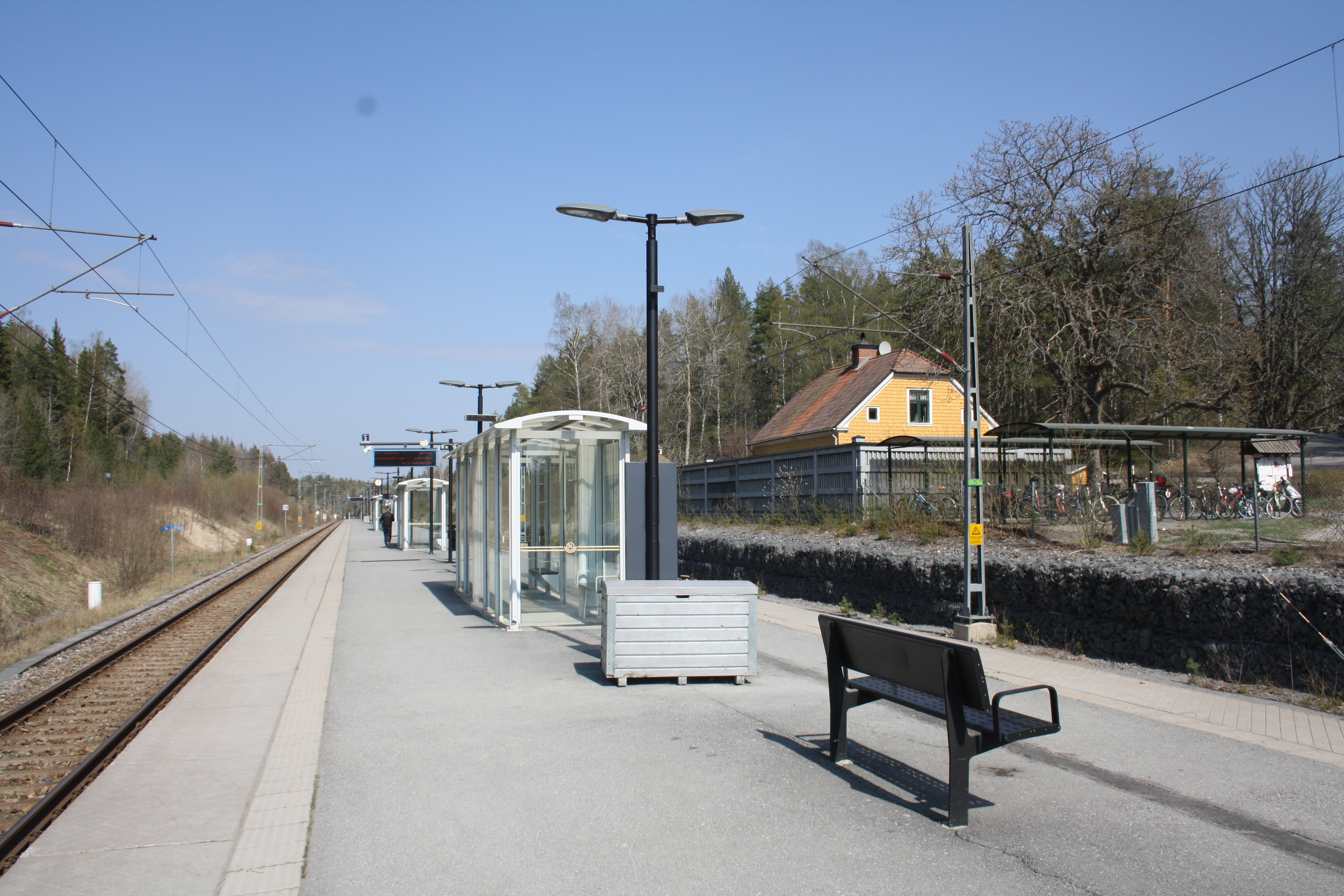
Platform area

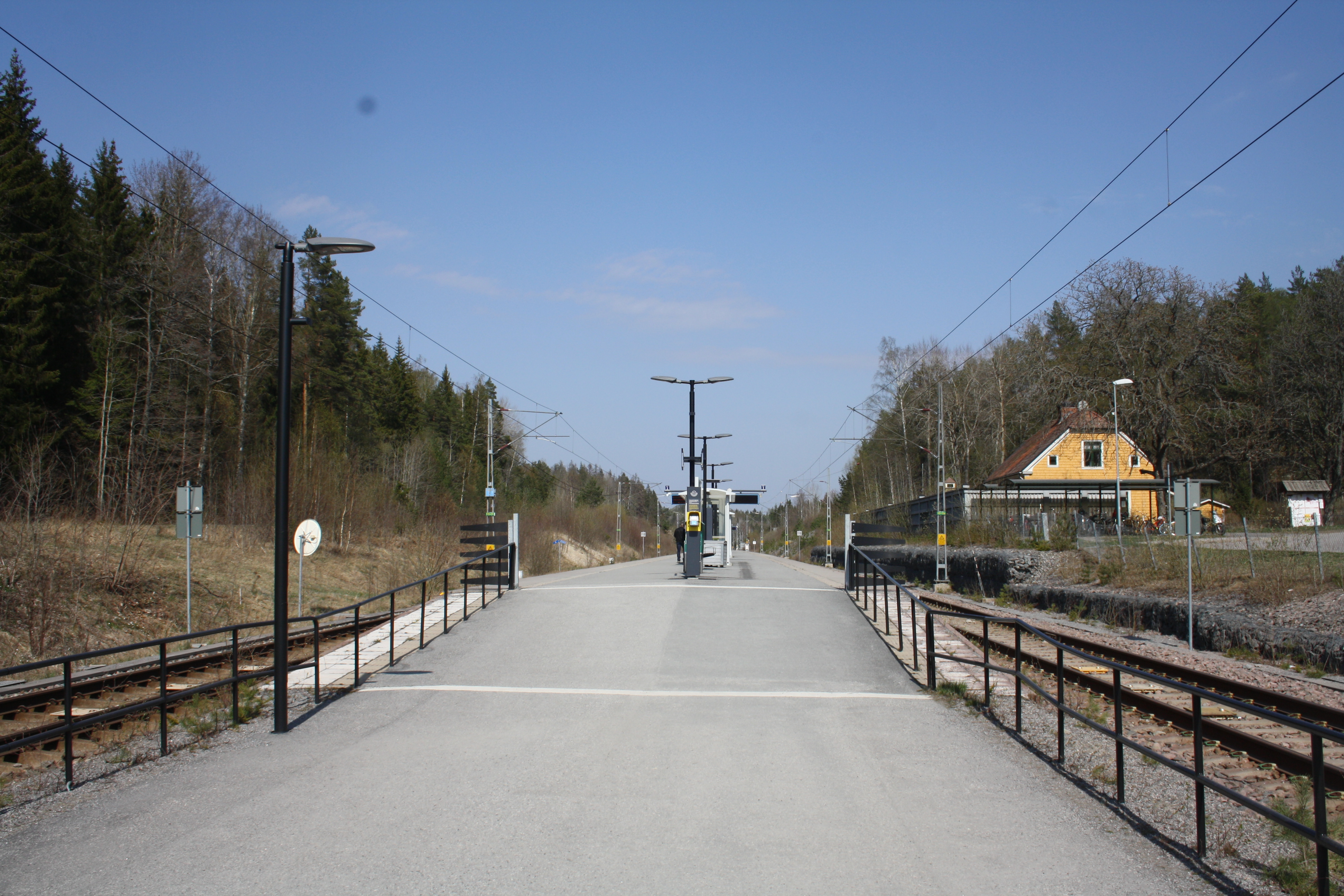
Stairs leading to the platform
