= Ösmo railway station =

Railway station in Nynäshamn, Sweden

Ösmo
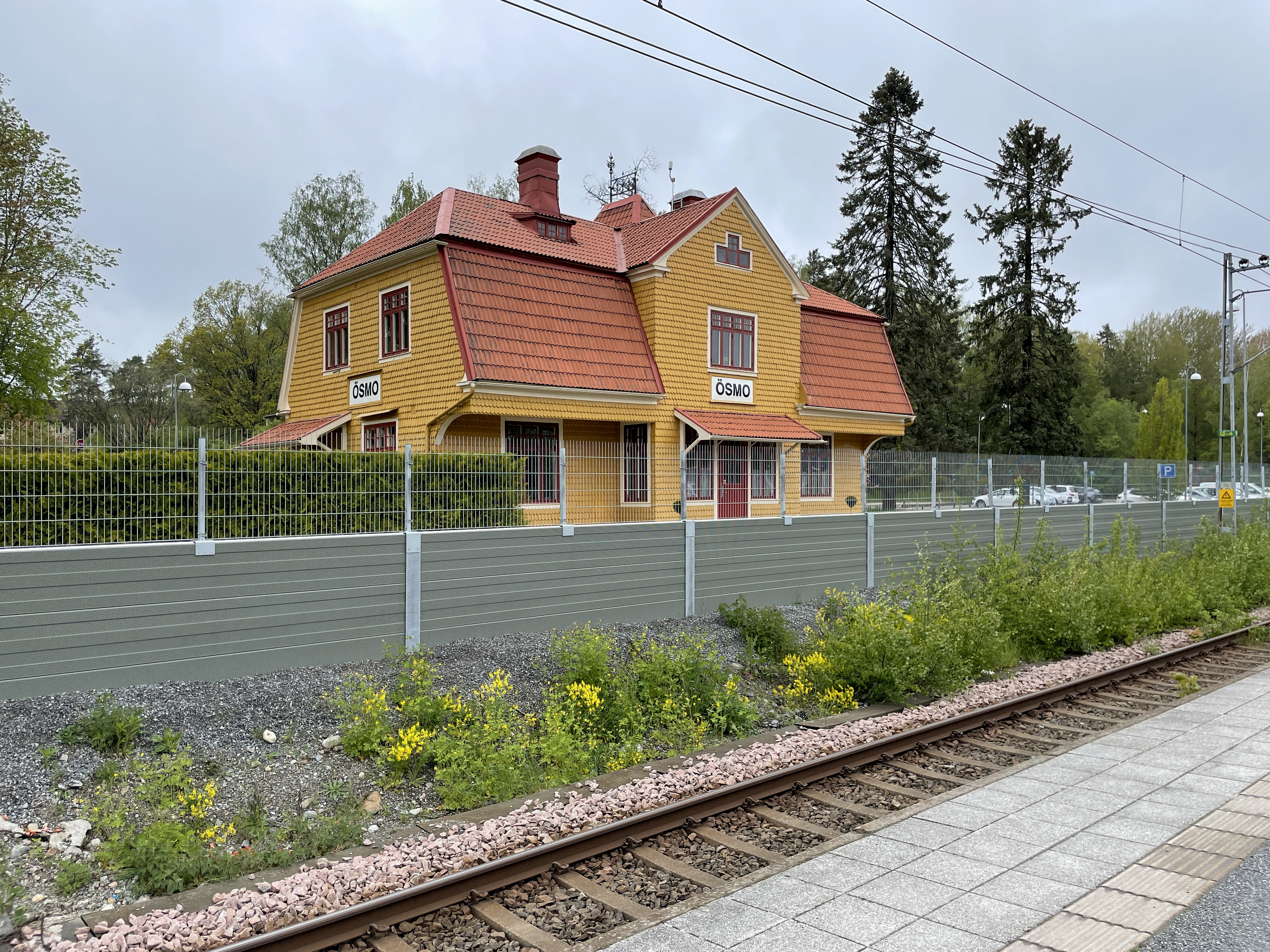
- Nynäshamn railway station in 2011

General information
- Location: Ösmo, Nynäshamn Municipality; Stockholm County; Sweden
- Coordinates: 58°59′04″N 17°54′09″E
- System: Pendeltåg
- Operator: SL
- Line: Nynäs Line
- Platforms: 1
- Tracks: 2

Construction
- Architect: Ferdinand Boberg

History
- Opened: 1901

Passengers
- 2019: 1,300 boarding per weekday (commuter rail)

Services
Preceding station	Stockholm commuter rail	Following station
Segersäng towards Märsta	42X	Nynäsgård towards Nynäshamn
Segersäng towards Kallhäll	43X	Nynäsgård towards Nynäshamn
Segersäng towards Bålsta	43	Nynäsgård towards Nynäshamn
Location
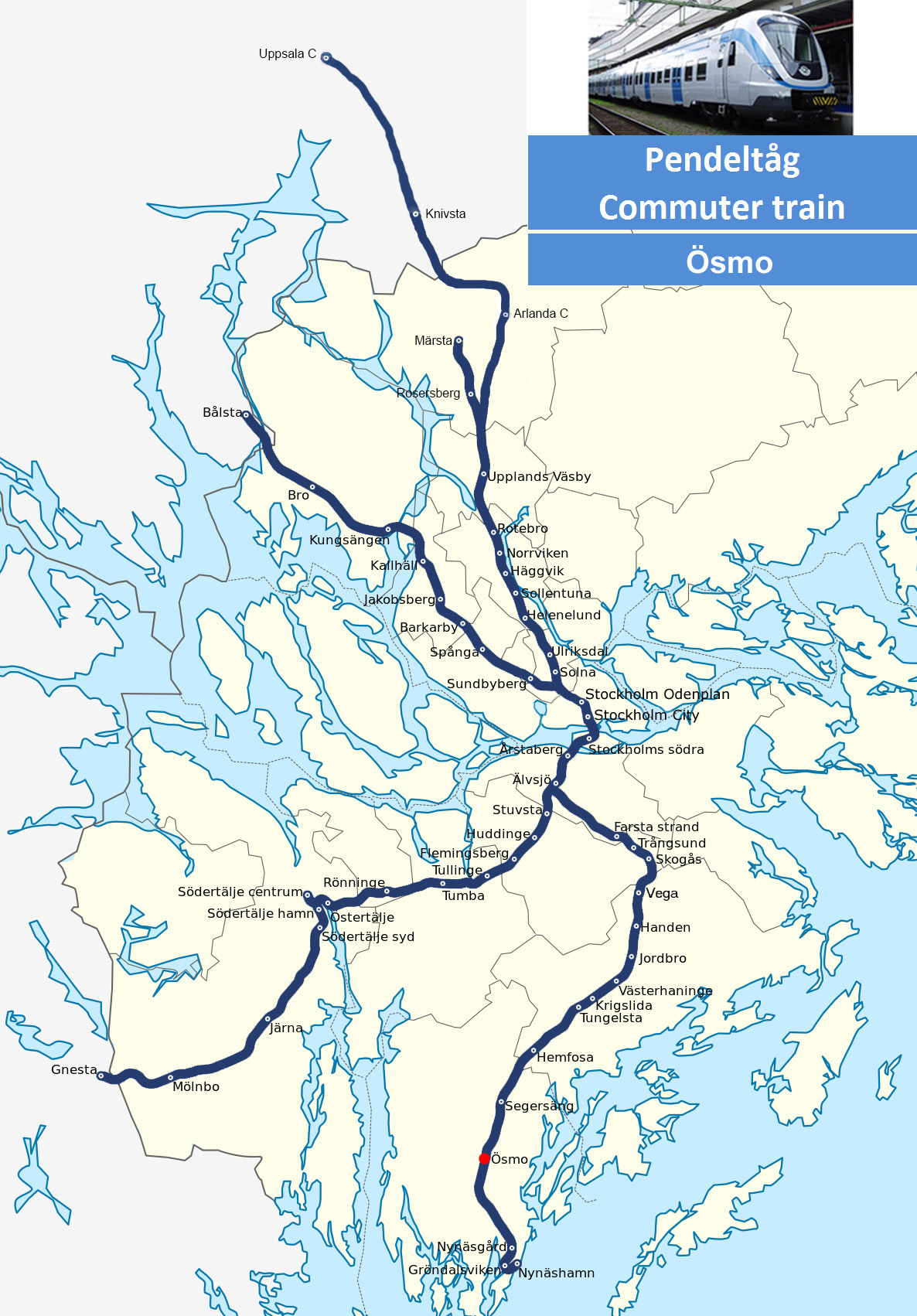

Ösmo station is a railway station on the Nynäs Line of Stockholm's commuter rail network, located in the urban area of Ösmo in the municipality of Nynäshamn in Stockholm County. As of 2019, on a normal winter weekday, the station has approximately 1,300 boarding passengers. The station is located on the single-track Hemfosa-Nynäshamn section of the line, and lacks ticket barriers. The journey time from Ösmo to Stockholm City railway station is approximately 45 minutes.

== History ==
The station was opened to traffic in 1901 with the inauguration of the line. The station building, designed by architect Ferdinand Boberg, is the best preserved of the Nynäs Line's original station buildings, however is no longer part of the railway, and is now a private house. In 2008, the station's platform was extended to accommodate full-length SL X60 trains. At the same time, a new entrance was built towards Nyblevägen in the south for a better connection to the new bus terminal, which was inaugurated at the end of 2009.

== Gallery ==
=== Old Station Building ===
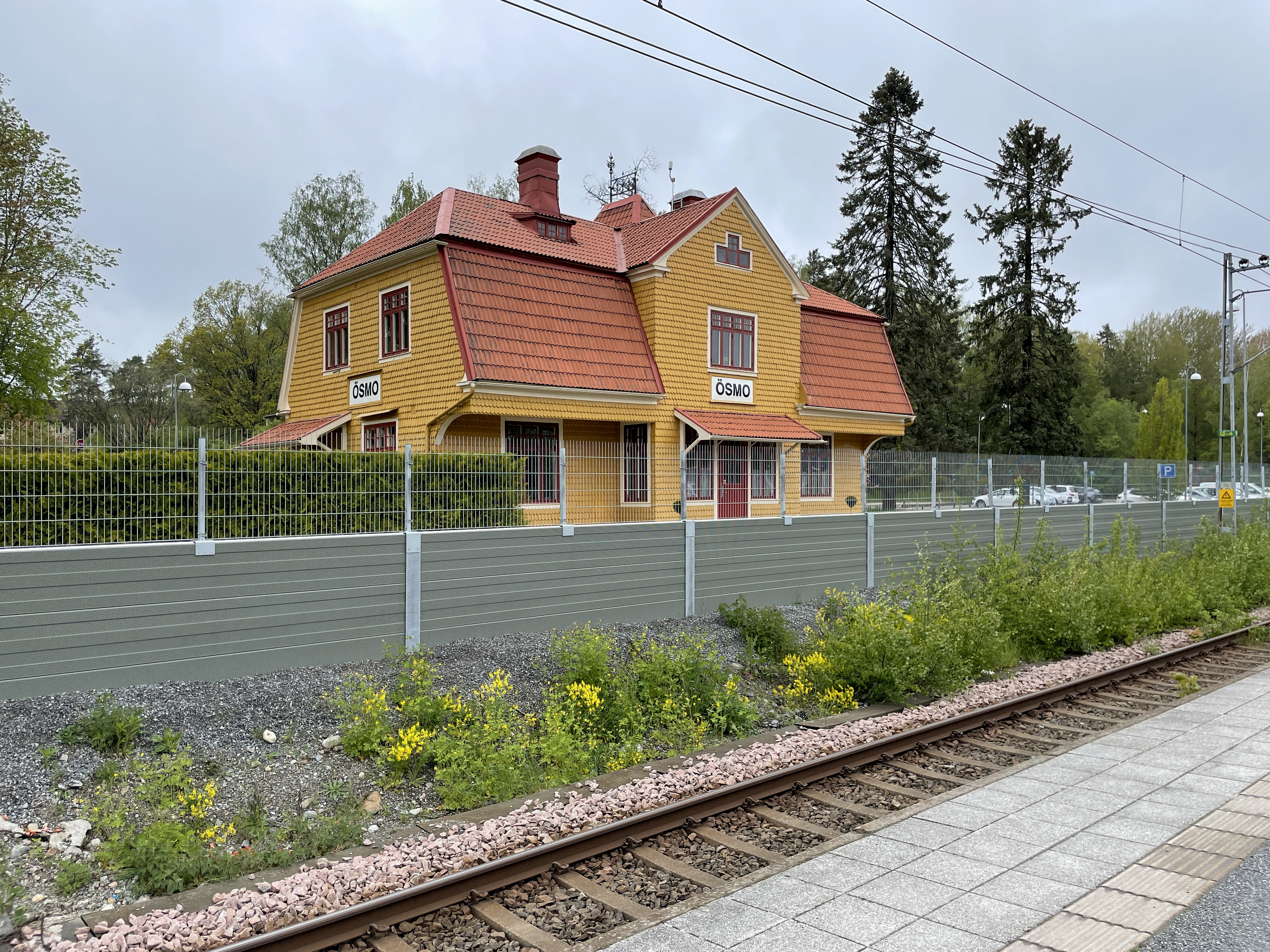

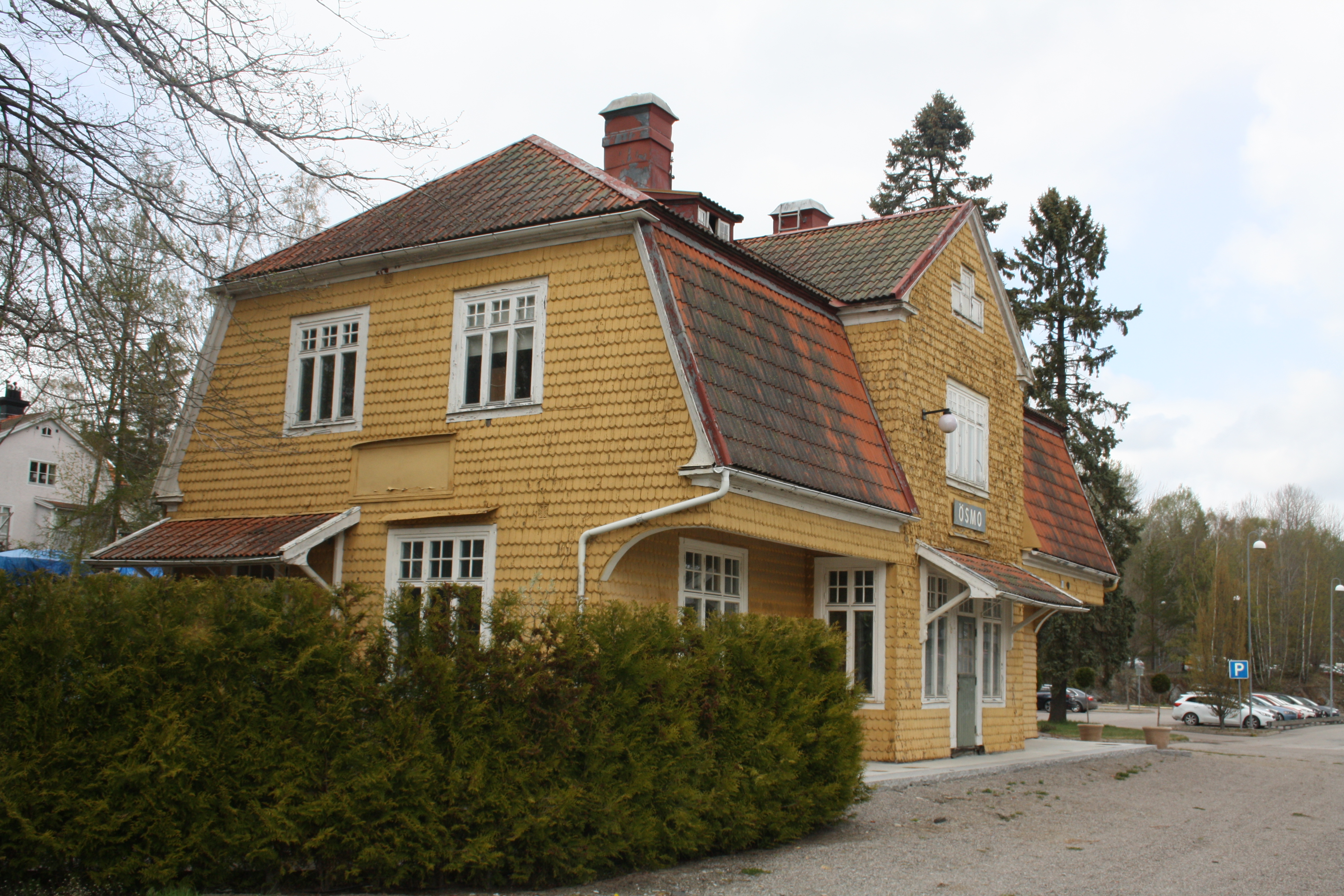

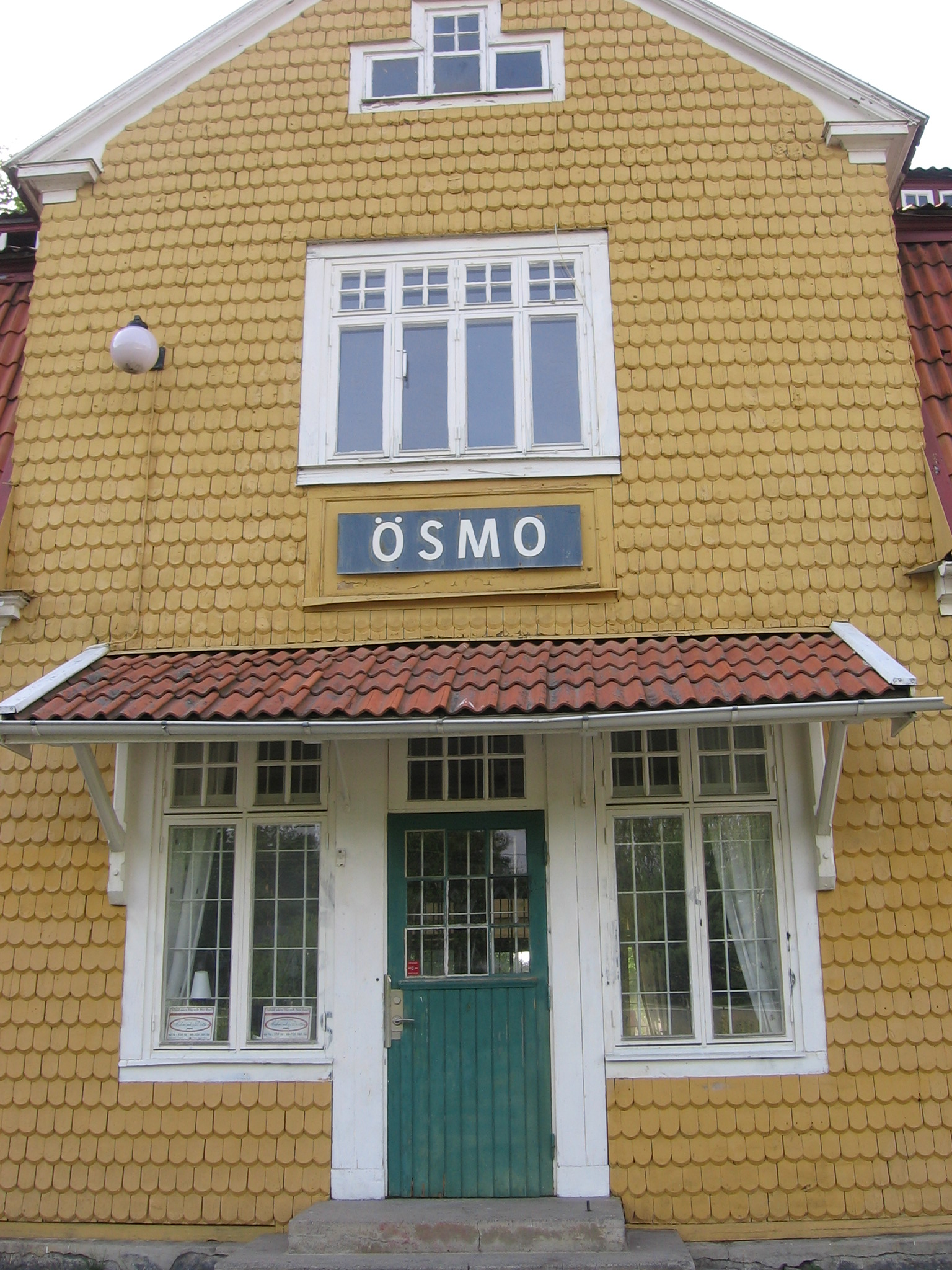

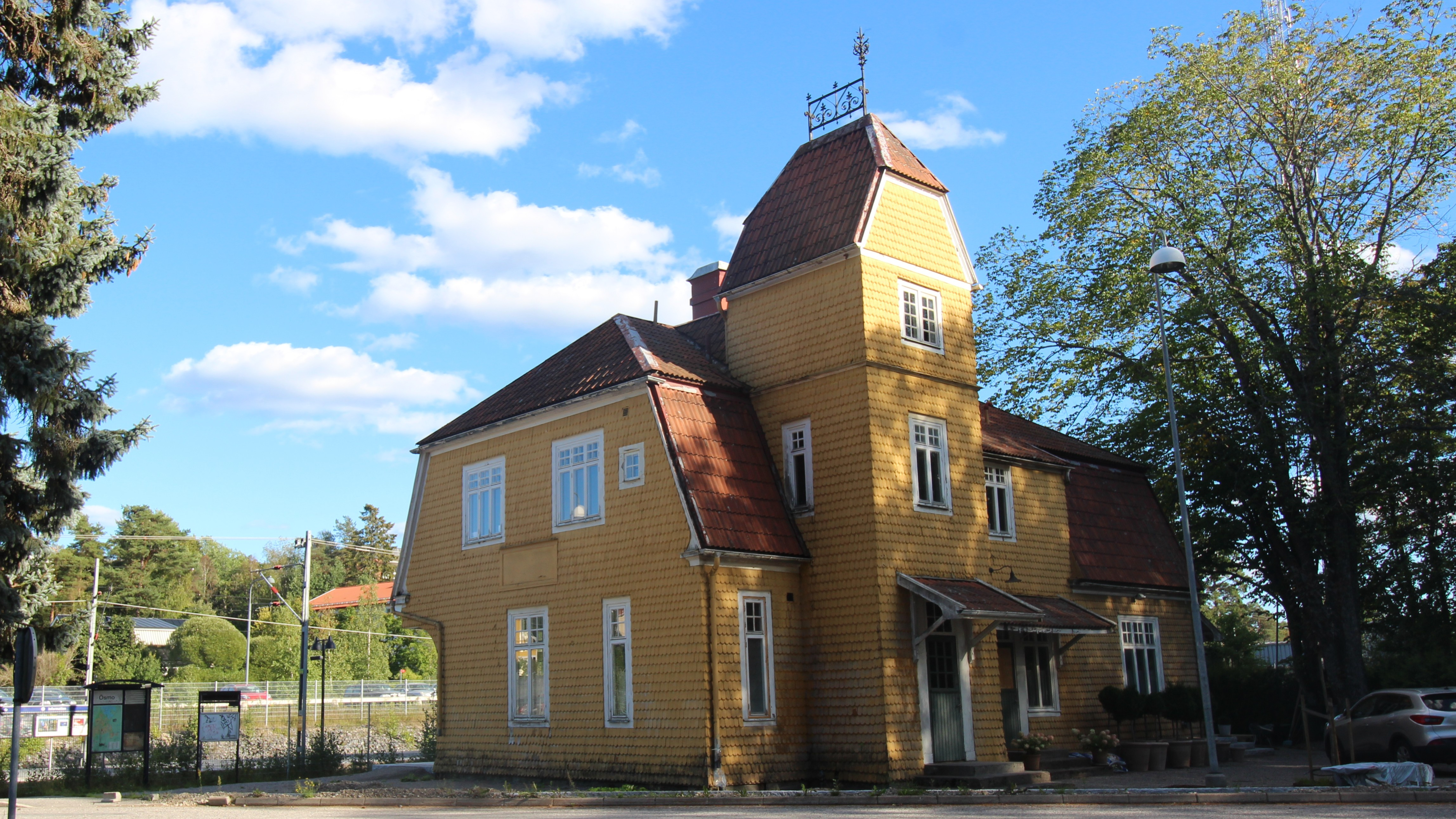

=== Current Station Building ===
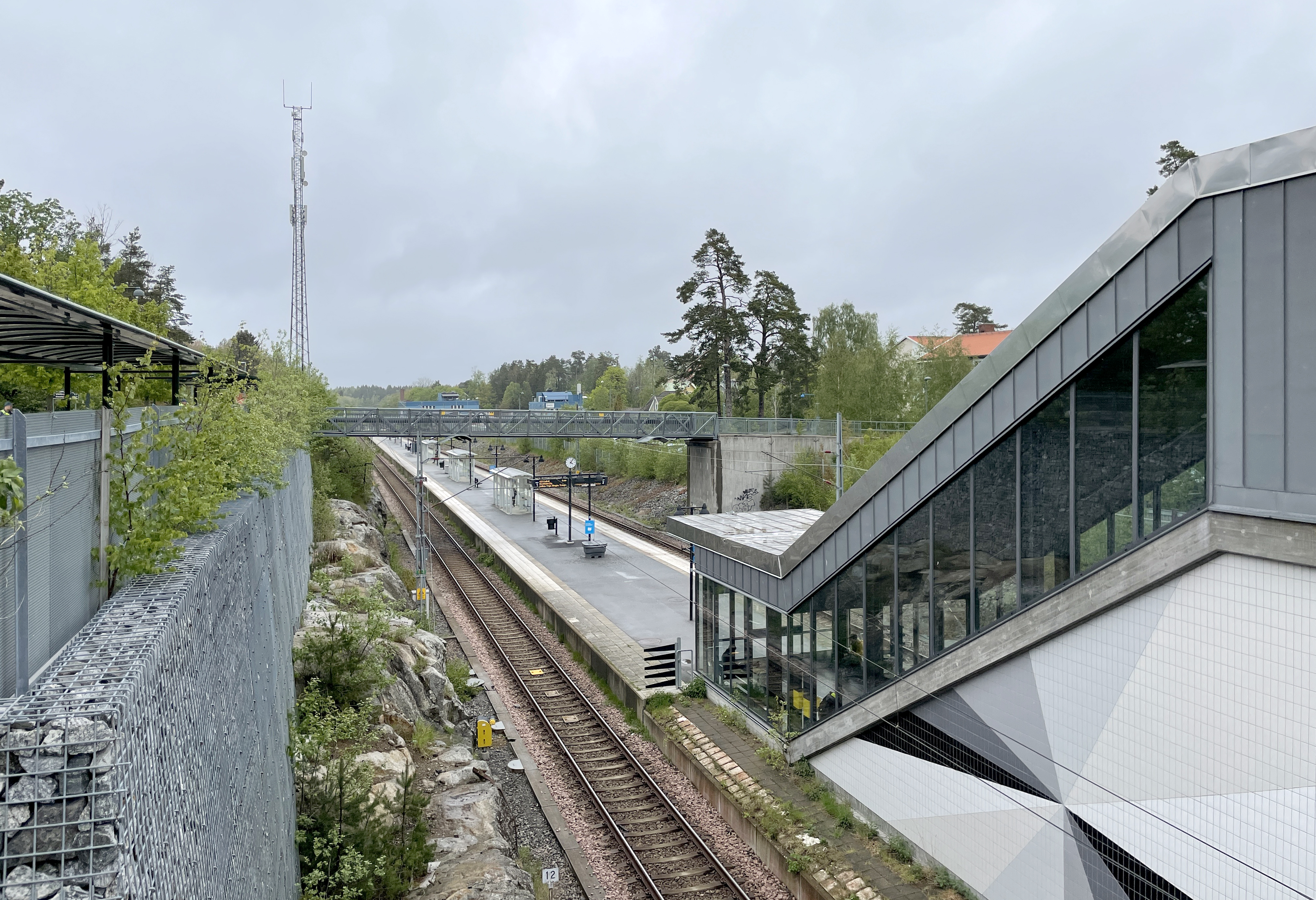

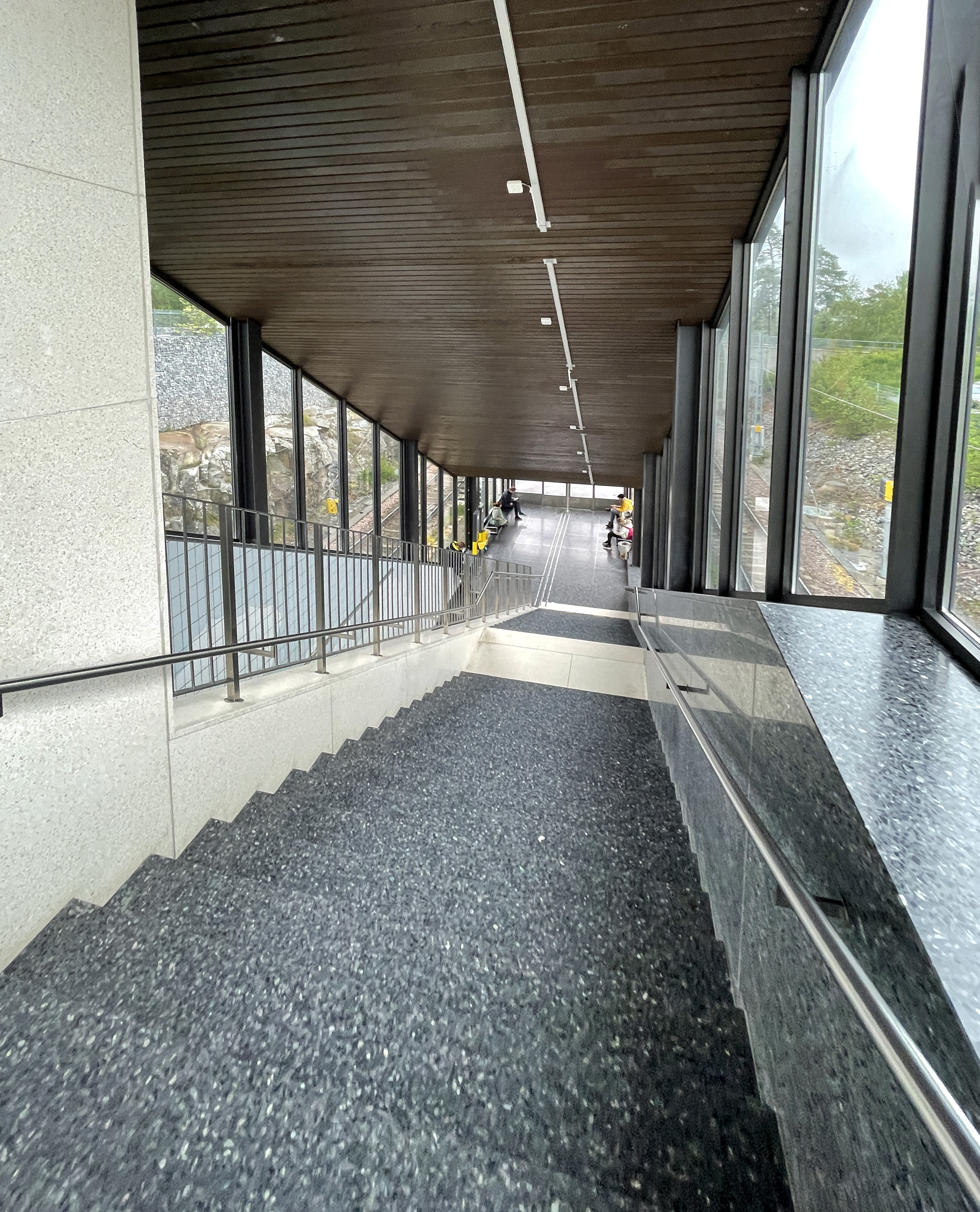

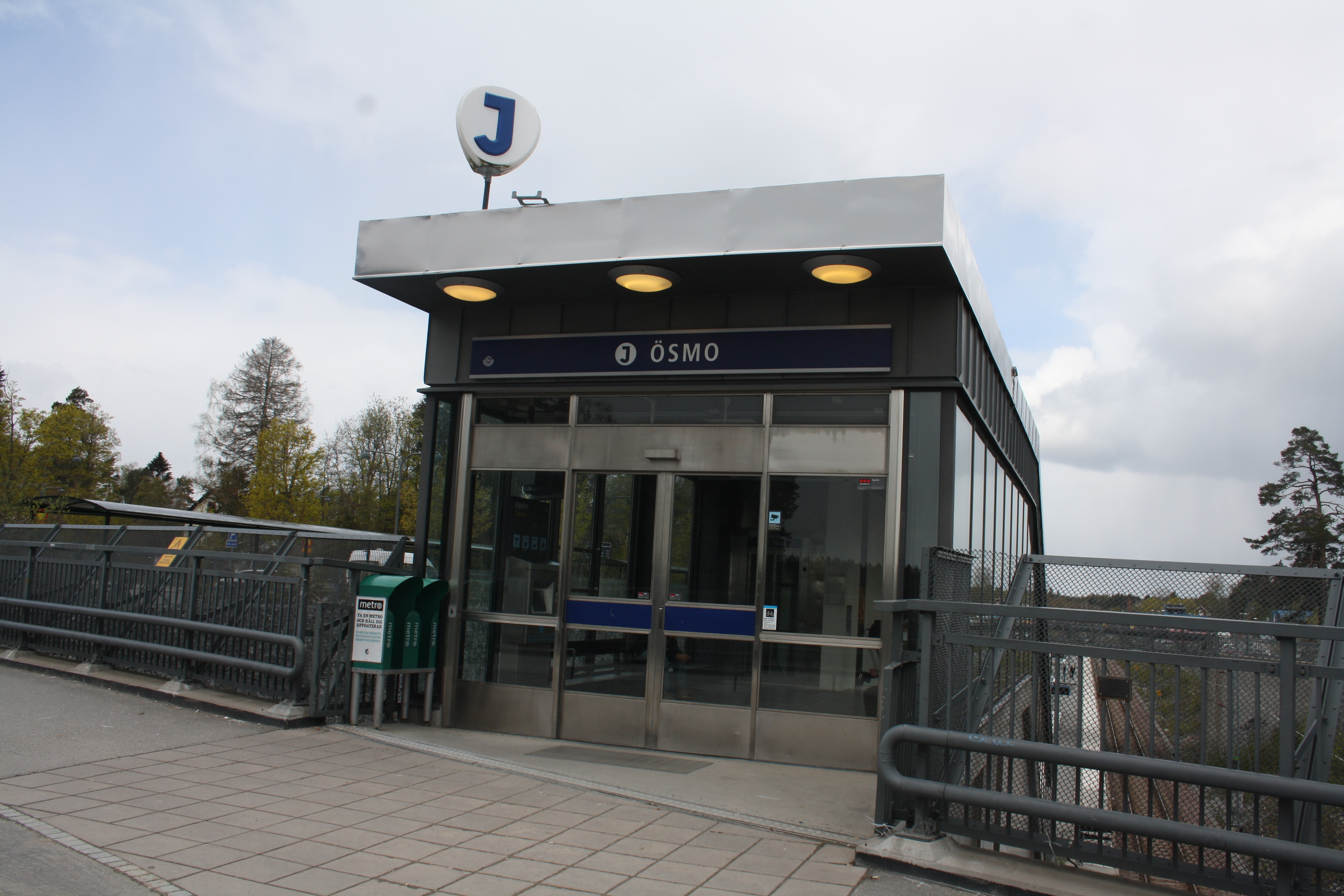

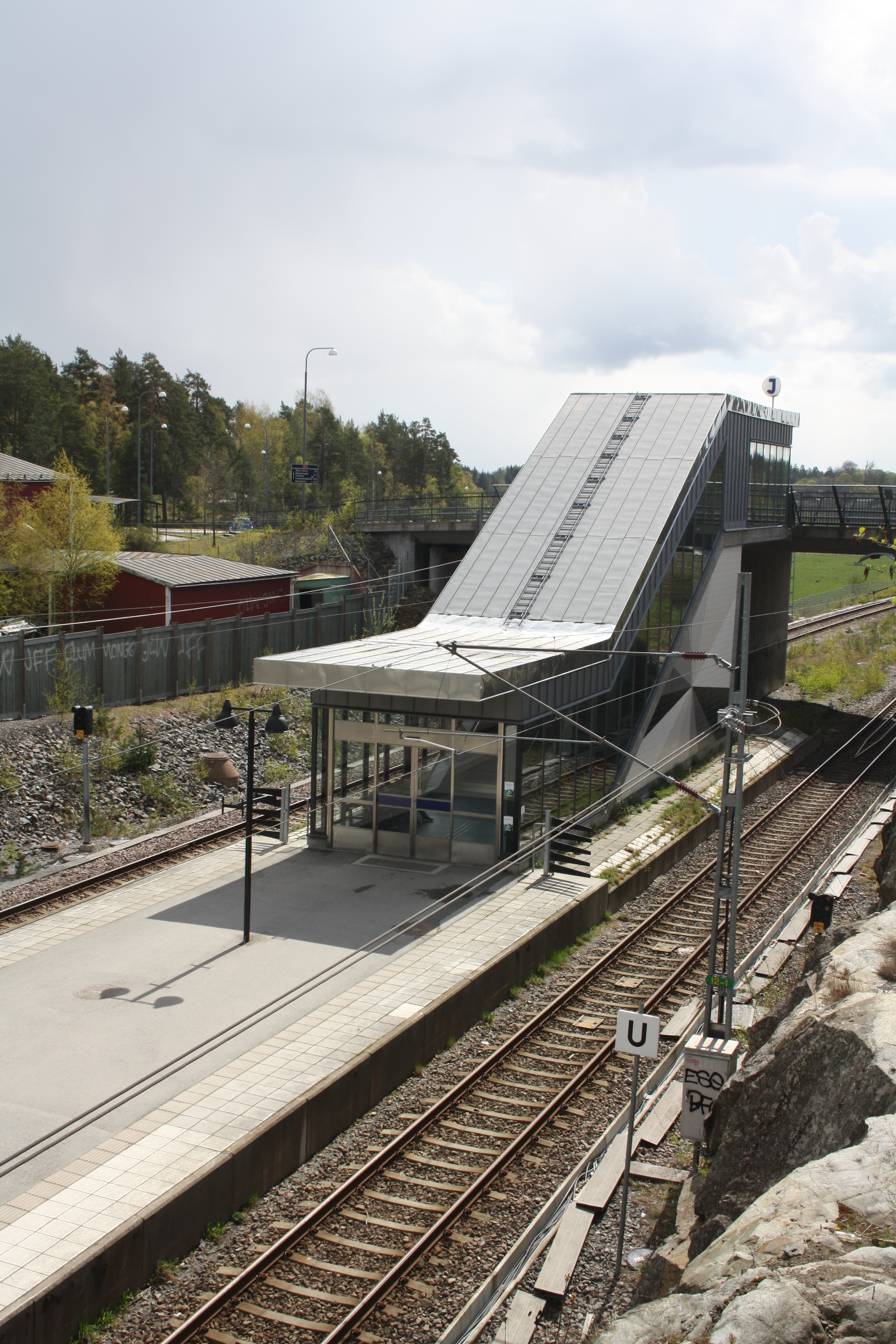

=== Platform ===
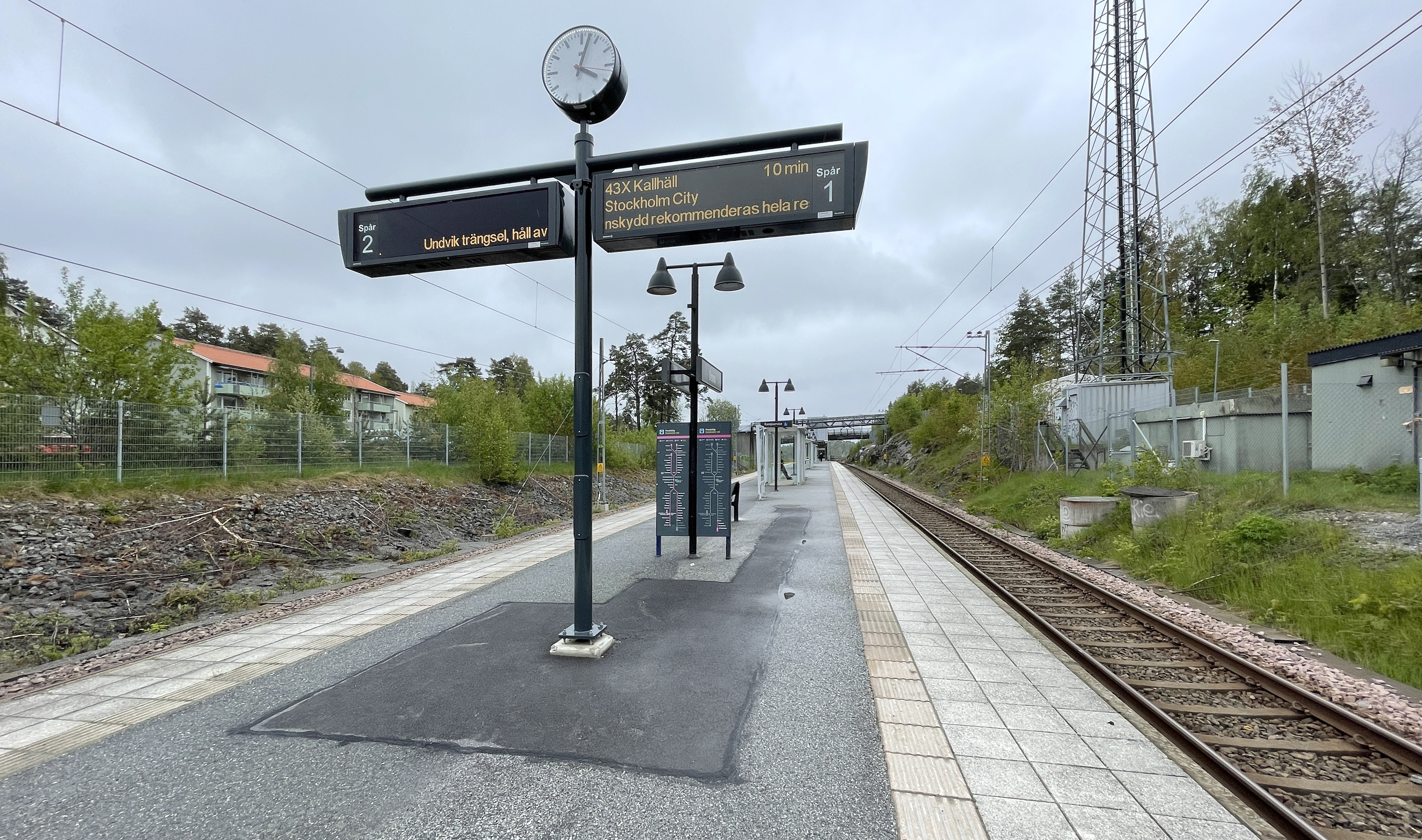

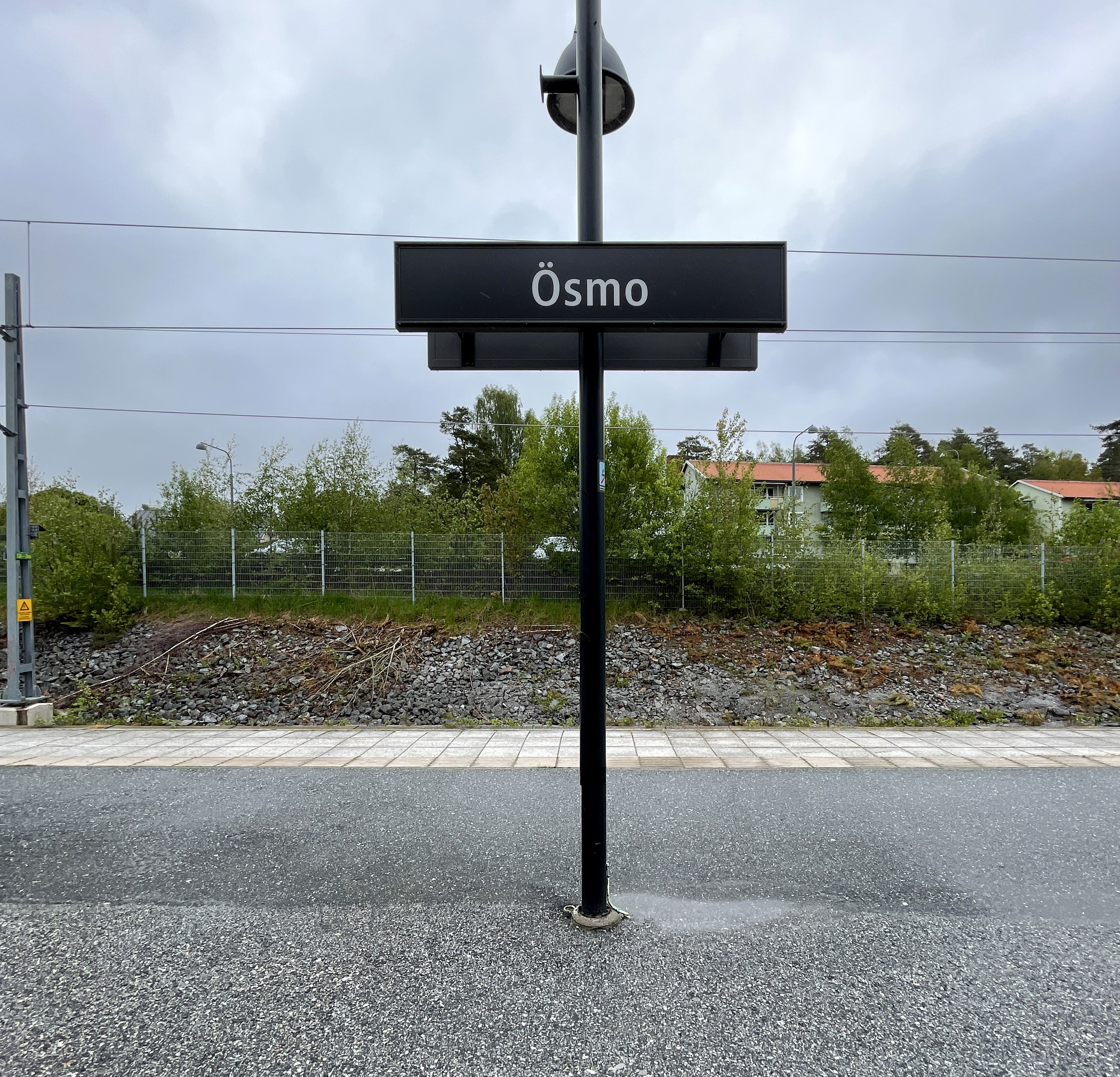

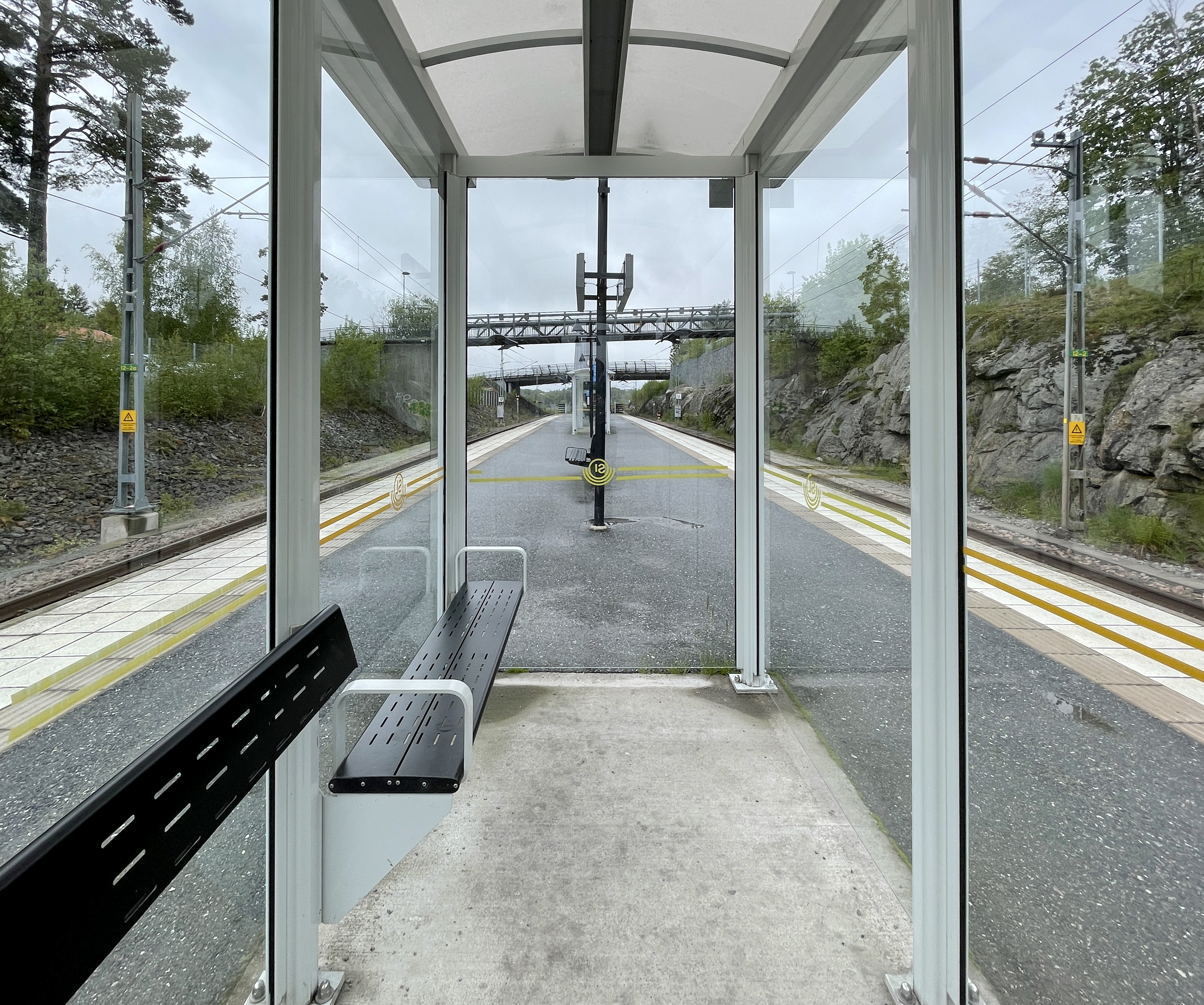

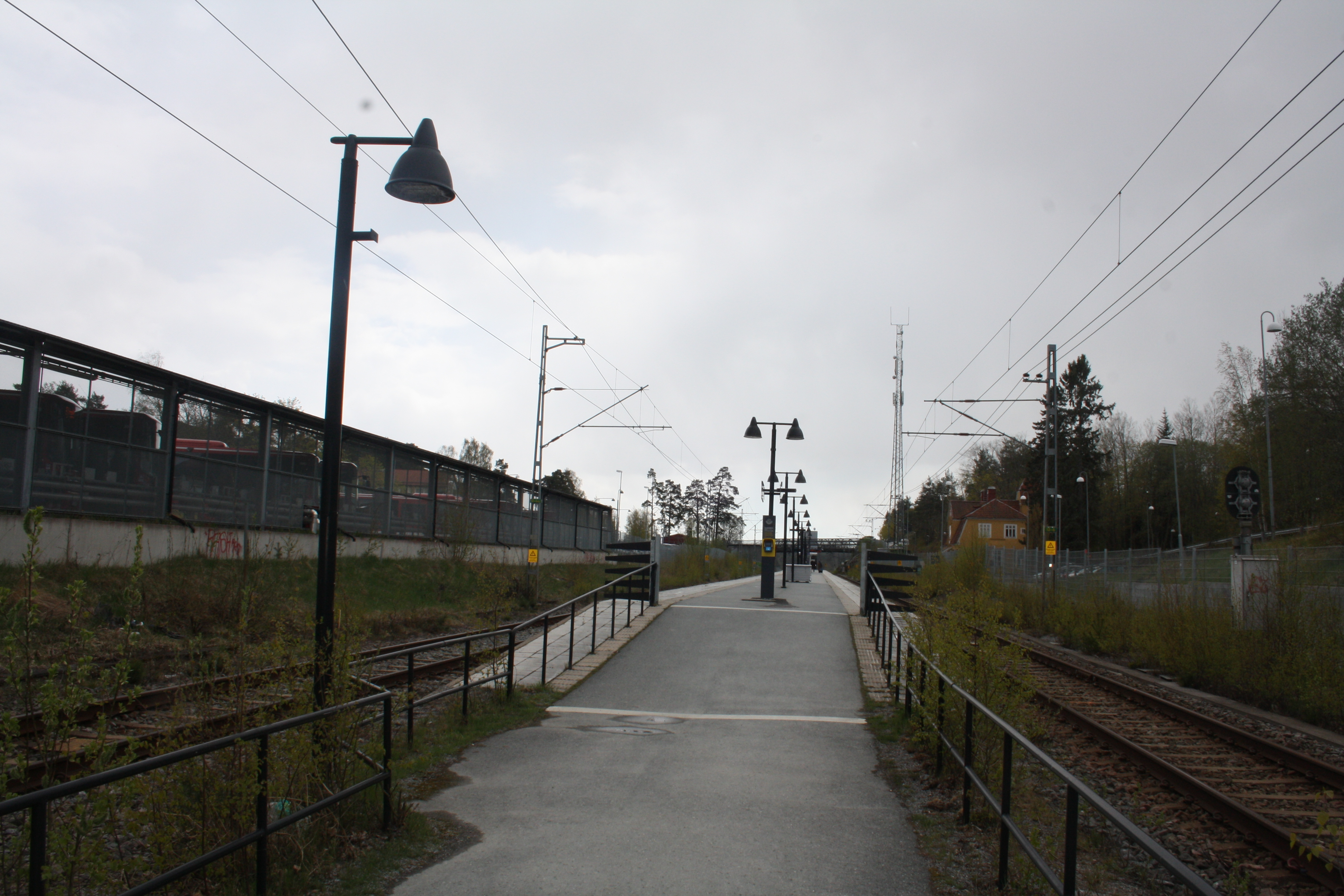
