= Iréne Theorin =

Swedish dramatic soprano opera singer (born 1963)

Lena Iréne Sofie Theorin (born 18 June 1963) is a Swedish dramatic soprano opera singer.

== Education and early years ==
Born in Gislaved Municipality (at the time Burseryd municipality), Småland, Theorin studied at the Academy of Music and Drama of the University of Gothenburg. After one year there, she received a contract at The Göteborg Opera in Gothenburg. After that she continued studying at 'The Opera Academy' in Copenhagen, Denmark. During her final year there, she also studied at the Royal Danish Academy of Music and received an Advanced postgraduate diploma. In 1998, she was a recipient of a Léonie Sonning scholarship (Danish: Stipendium fra Léonie Sonnings Musikfond).

Theorin's professional debut took place in Copenhagen, as Donna Anna in Mozart's Don Giovanni. Her repertoire includes Brünnhilde in Wagner's Der Ring des Nibelungen, Isolde in his Tristan und Isolde, the title role in Puccini's Turandot, and Elisabetta in Verdi's Don Carlos.

== Career ==
Theorin performed at the Royal Danish Theatre in Copenhagen in 2004, at the New National Theatre Tokyo in 2005 and performed the role of Brünnhilde on tour with Staatstheater Nürnberg at the Beijing Music Festival in the same year, in Richard Wagner's first-ever Ring Cycle in China. The cycle was produced by Stephen Lawless and the performances were conducted by Philippe Auguin. She performed as Helmwige in the "Ride of the Valkyries" conducted by Antonio Pappano in the 2005 Proms season at the Royal Albert Hall. During the Bayreuth Festival in 2008, Theorin performed the title role of Isolde in Tristan und Isolde and in 2009 gave guest performances at the Washington National Opera and the Metropolitan Opera in New York. Theorin has sung at such opera houses as the Deutsche Oper Berlin, Germany, the Vienna State Opera, Austria, the Mariinsky Theatre in Saint Petersburg, Russia, the Bavarian State Opera, Munich, Germany, the Liceu in Barcelona, Spain, the Salzburg Festival, Austria, The Royal Opera House, London the Teatro alla Scala in Milan, Italy and the Royal Swedish Opera in Stockholm, Sweden.

== Personal life ==
Theorin lives in Broaryd, Sweden. She has three sons.
