= Theorin =

Theorin is a Swedish surname. Notable people with the surname include:

- Bernt Theorin, footballer
- Daniel Theorin (born 1983), Swedish footballer
- Iréne Theorin (born 1963), Swedish operatic soprano
- Johan Theorin (born 1963), Swedish journalist and author
- Maj Britt Theorin (1932–2021), Swedish politician
