= Niclas Palmgren =

Swedish politician

Niclas John-Fredrik Palmgren (born 30 March 1970) is a Swedish politician of the Moderate Party. He served as Mayor of Gislaved Municipality from 2006 to 2014 and was municipal commissioner from 2002 to 2018. He succeeded Bengt-Anders Johansson on the position of municipal commissioner.

Following the 2014 elections, Palmgren was elected President of the City Council. From January 2015 to April 2018, Palmgren served as deputy mayor with responsibility for enterprise issues. He is chairman of the municipality's Committee on Construction and the Environment. He is also chairman of the Committee on Rescue Issues in Gislaved Municipality and Gnosjö Municipality.

Preceded by Agne Sahlin (S)	Mayor of Gislaved Municipality; 2006–2014	Succeeded by Marie Johansson (S)
