= Krabby, Sweden =

Coordinates: 57°17′00″N 013°22′00″E

Krabby is a populated place in Gislaved Municipality, Jönköping County, Sweden.
