= 1991 Swedish local elections =

1991 local government elections in Sweden

Local elections were held in Sweden on 15 September 1991 to elect county councils and municipal councils. The elections were held alongside general elections.

== Results ==
=== Municipal elections ===
| Party | Votes | % | Seats |
|---|---|---|---|
| Swedish Social Democratic Party | 2,016,883 | 36.56 | 5,194 |
| Moderate Party | 1,222,339 | 22.16 | 2,661 |
| Centre Party | 617,319 | 11.19 | 2,065 |
| Liberal People's Party | 528,000 | 9.57 | 1,188 |
| Christian Democratic Unity | 318,762 | 5.78 | 815 |
| Left Party | 267,485 | 4.85 | 574 |
| Green Party | 199,207 | 3.61 | 389 |
| New Democracy | 188,085 | 3.41 | 335 |
| Others | 158,896 | 2.88 | 305 |
| Total | 5,516,976 | 100.00 | 13,526 |
| Valid votes | 5,516,976 | 98.13 | |
| Invalid/blank votes | 105,205 | 1.87 | |
| Total votes | 5,622,181 | 100.00 | |
Source: SCB

==== Minor parties ====
| Parties | Seats | Municipalities |
|---|---|---|
| Botkyrka Party | 3 | Botkyrka Municipality |
| Huddinge Party | 5 | Huddinge Municipality |
| Lidingö Party | 7 | Lidingö Municipality |
| Kommunal samling | 1 | Norrtälje Municipality |
| Pensioners' Party | 1 | Nynäshamn Municipality |
| Samling för Sigtuna | 2 | Sigtuna Municipality |
| Sollentuna Party | 6 | Sollentuna Municipality |
| Stockholm Party | 3 | Stockholm Municipality |
| Kommunala rättspartiet Tyresö | 2 | Tyresö Municipality |
| Täby Party (TMF) | 2 | Täby Municipality |
| Solidarity Party | 2 | Vallentuna Municipality |
| Demokratiska särlistan | 5 | Älvkarleby Municipality |
| Free Municipal Party | 1 | Flen Municipality |
| NAG (Mot storflygplats på Skavsta) | 1 | Nyköping Municipality |
| Strängnäs Party | 8 | Strängnäs Municipality |
| Finspong Party | 3 | Finspång Municipality |
| Kinda Party | 7 | Kinda Municipality |
| Kommunal samverkan | 2 | Valdemarsvik Municipality |
| Åtvidaberg Party | 7 | Åtvidaberg Municipality |
| Ösjö lokalparti | 4 | Ödeshög Municipality |
| Environment Party | 2 | Aneby Municipality |
| KPMLR-Revolutionaries | 2+4 | Karlshamn Municipality (4), Gislaved Municipality (2) |
| SAFE | 9 | Nässjö Municipality |
| Tranåsborna | 2 | Tranås Municipality |
| Workers Party - Communists | 1 | Värnamo Municipality (1) |
| Alvesta Alternative | 8 | Alvesta Municipality |
| Progress Party | 1+1+3 | Åstorp Municipality (3), Klippan Municipality (1), Markaryd Municipality (1) |
| Kommunens bästa | 4 | Borgholm Municipality |
| Partiet Partiet | 8 | Emmaboda Municipality |
| VDM Democratic Environmental Party of Västervik | 4 | Västervik Municipality |
| Strängnäs Party | 8 | Strängnäs Municipality |
| Humlorna Sveriges förenade stater | 1 | Olofström Municipality |
| Bjäre Party | 1 | Båstad Municipality |
