= Ösmo =

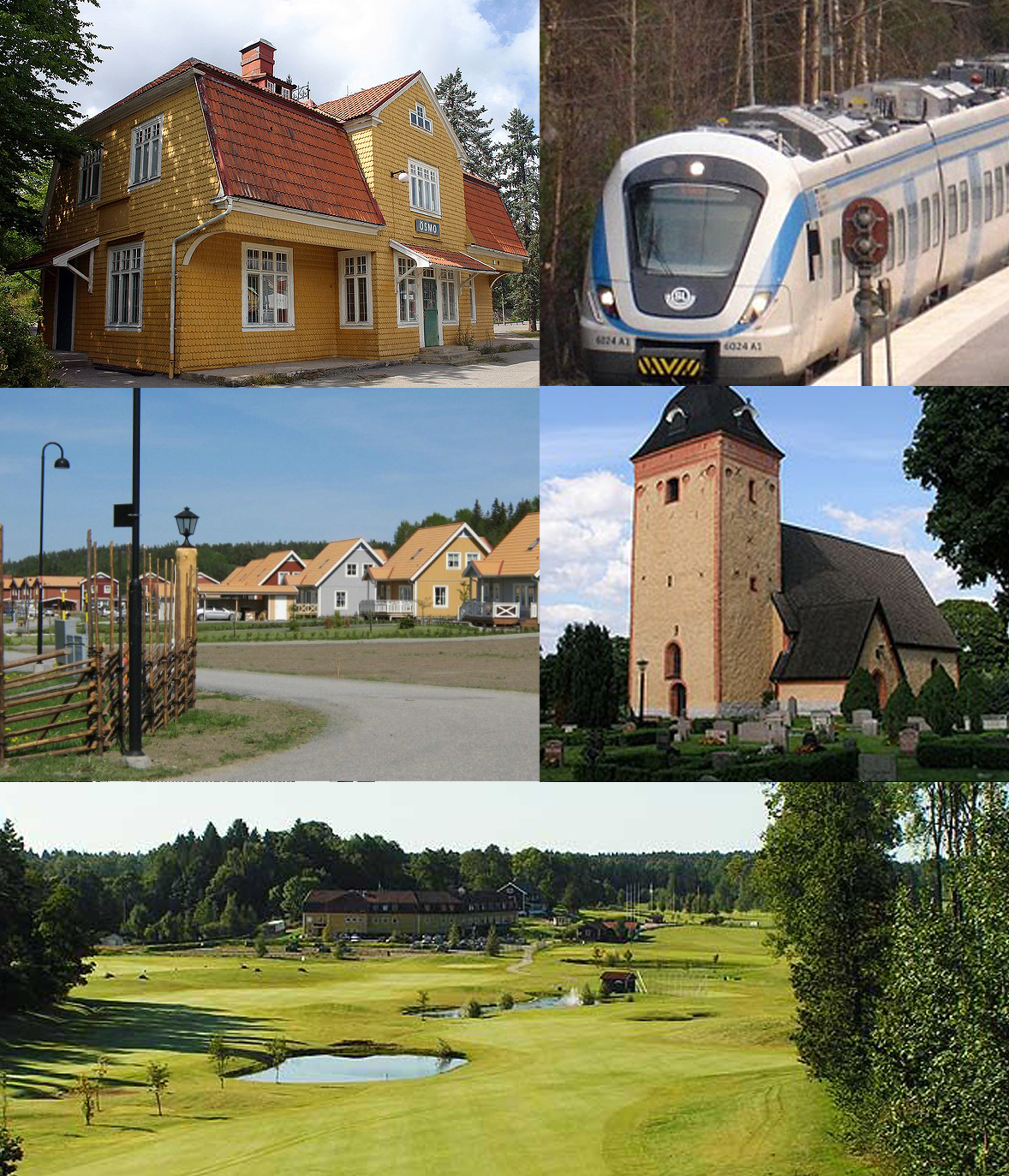
- Ösmo

- Location within Stockholm Location within Sweden Location within European Union
- Coordinates: 58°59′N 17°54′E
- Country: Sweden
- Province: Södermanland
- County: Stockholm County
- Municipality: Nynäshamn Municipality

Area
  - Total: 2.19 km^{2} (0.85 sq mi)

Population (31 December 2010)
  - Total: 3,911
  - Density: 1,783/km^{2} (4,620/sq mi)
- Time zone: UTC+1 (CET)
  - Summer (DST): UTC+2 (CEST)

Ösmo (Swedish pronunciation: [ˈœ̂sːmʊ]) is a locality situated in Nynäshamn Municipality, Stockholm County, Sweden with 3,911 inhabitants in 2010. It has a station on the Stockholm commuter rail network, Nynäshamn line (Nynäsbanan).
