= Reftele =

- Location within Jönköping Location within Sweden
- Coordinates: 57°11′N 13°35′E
- Country: Sweden
- Province: Småland
- County: Jönköping County
- Municipality: Gislaved Municipality

Area
  - Total: 1.60 km^{2} (0.62 sq mi)

Population (31 December 2010)
  - Total: 1,282
  - Density: 802/km^{2} (2,080/sq mi)
- Time zone: UTC+1 (CET)
  - Summer (DST): UTC+2 (CEST)
- Climate: Cfb

Reftele (Swedish pronunciation: [ˈrɛ̂fːtɛlɛ]) is a locality situated in Gislaved Municipality, Jönköping County, Sweden with 1,282 inhabitants in 2010. Here lived Johan Svensson who died in the sinking of Titanic aged 75 and his son Amandus Ekström aged 45.
