= Skeppshult =

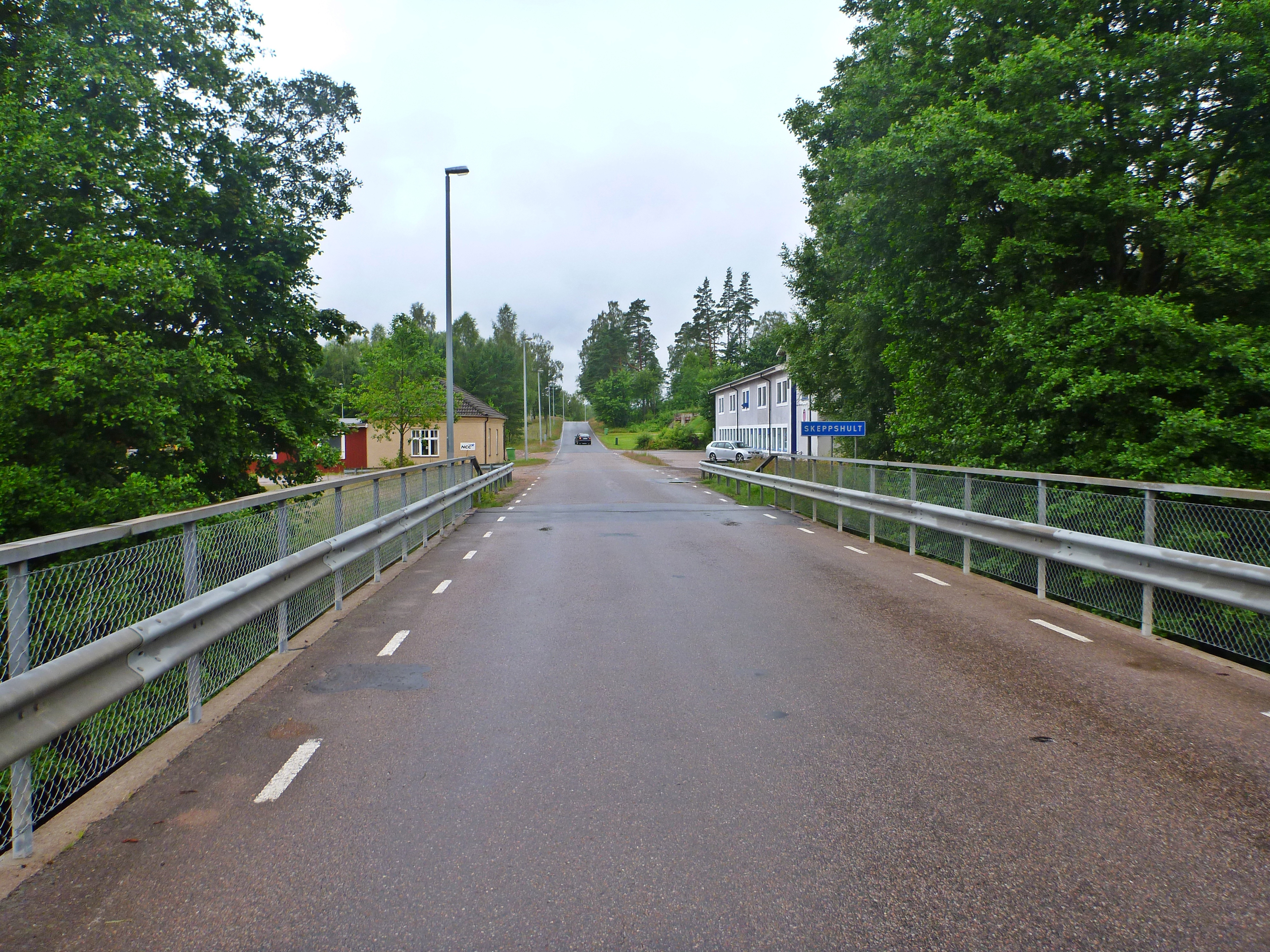
- Skeppshult from bridge over the Nissan River

- Location within Jönköping Location within Sweden
- Coordinates: 57°07′N 13°21′E
- Country: Sweden
- Province: Småland
- County: Jönköping County
- Municipality: Gislaved Municipality

Area
  - Total: 0.85 km^{2} (0.33 sq mi)

Population (31 December 2010)
  - Total: 365
  - Density: 427/km^{2} (1,110/sq mi)
- Time zone: UTC+1 (CET)
  - Summer (DST): UTC+2 (CEST)
- Climate: Cfb

Skeppshult is a locality situated in Gislaved Municipality, Jönköping County, Sweden beside river Nissan. In 2010 365 inhabitants lived in Skeppshult.
