= Södra Hestra Church =

- Södra Hestra kyrka
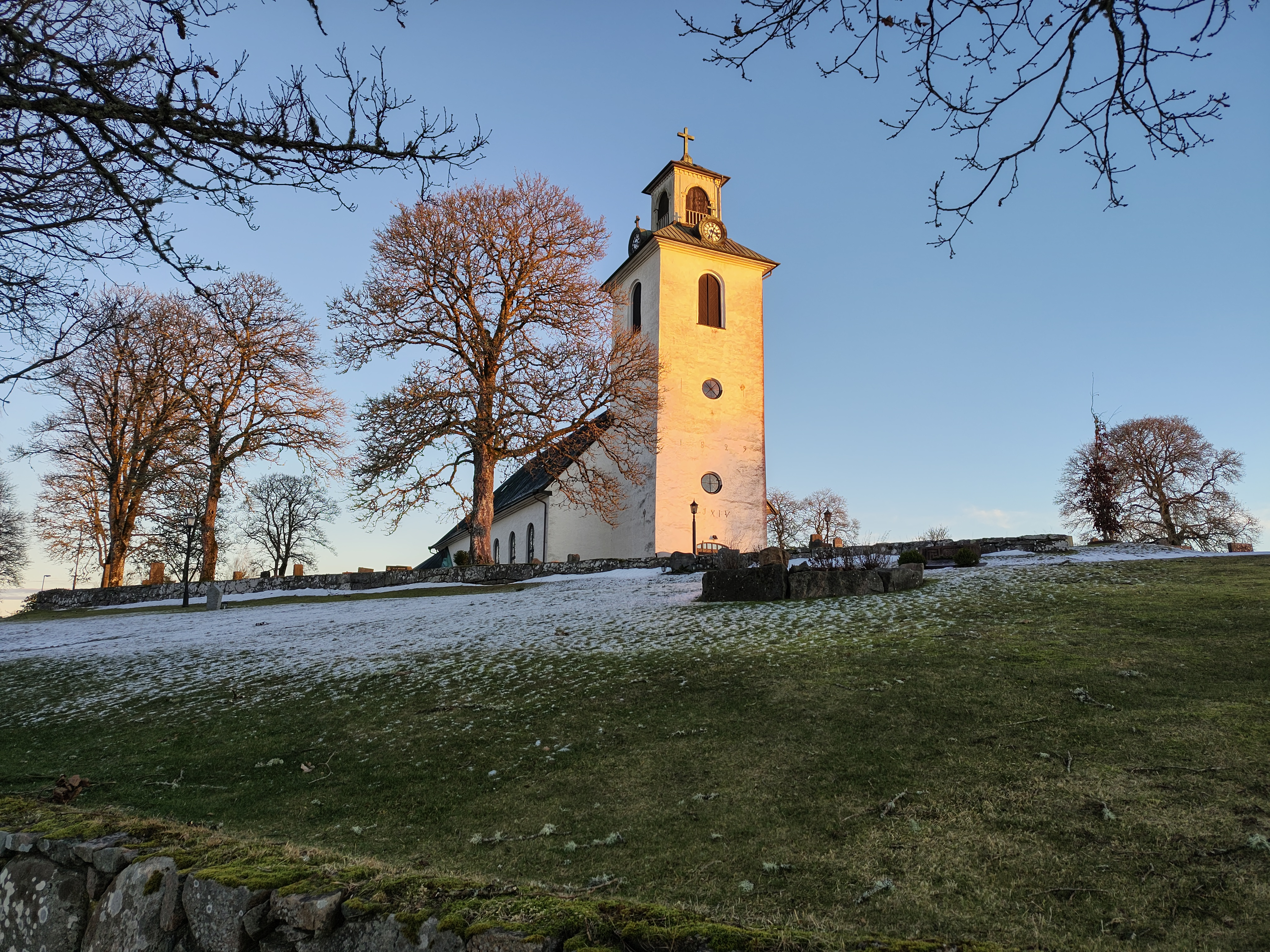
- Exterior (2025)
- Södra Hestra Church
- 57.122111°N 13.240611°E
- Location: Broaryd
- Address: Kyrkvägen 10, 333 92 Broaryd
- Country: Sweden
- Denomination: Church of Sweden

History
- Founded: Around 1200s
- Consecrated: 1835

Architecture
- Architect: Johan Abraham Wilelius

The Södra Hestra Church (Swedish: Södra Hestra Kyrka) or the Broaryd Church (Swedish: Broaryds Kyrka) is a church building in Broaryd, Sweden surrounded by a cultural heritage graveyard.

== Original church ==
A timber church at this location dates back to the 13th century. By the end of the 13th century, the timber church was replaced with a stone church. The current church was built between 1827 and 1830 and inaugurated in 1835.
