= Ören Nature Reserve =

Nature reserve in Stockholm, Sweden

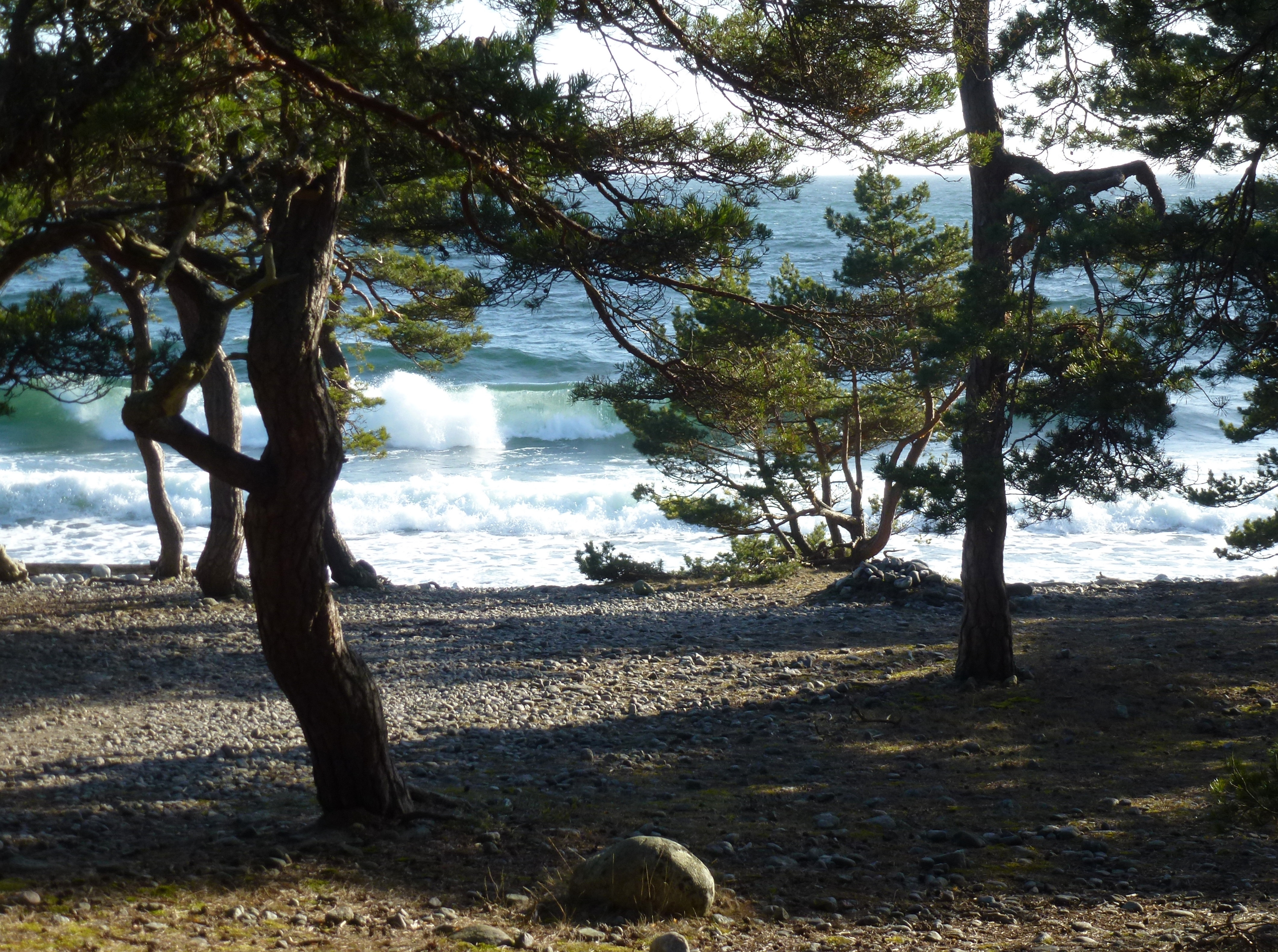

- Location within Stockholm
- Location: Sweden
- Nearest city: Nynäshamn
- Coordinates: 58°48′06″N 17°48′21″E

Ören Nature Reserve (Swedish: Örens naturreservat) is a nature reserve in Nynäshamn Municipality, Stockholm County in Sweden.

The nature reserve is located in the southern part of Torö island in Stockholm archipelago. It contains sparse Scots pine forest and is a well-known resting spot for migratory birds. The flora contains unusual species such as Crambe maritima, Cakile maritima and Lathyrus japonicus.
