= Segersäng =

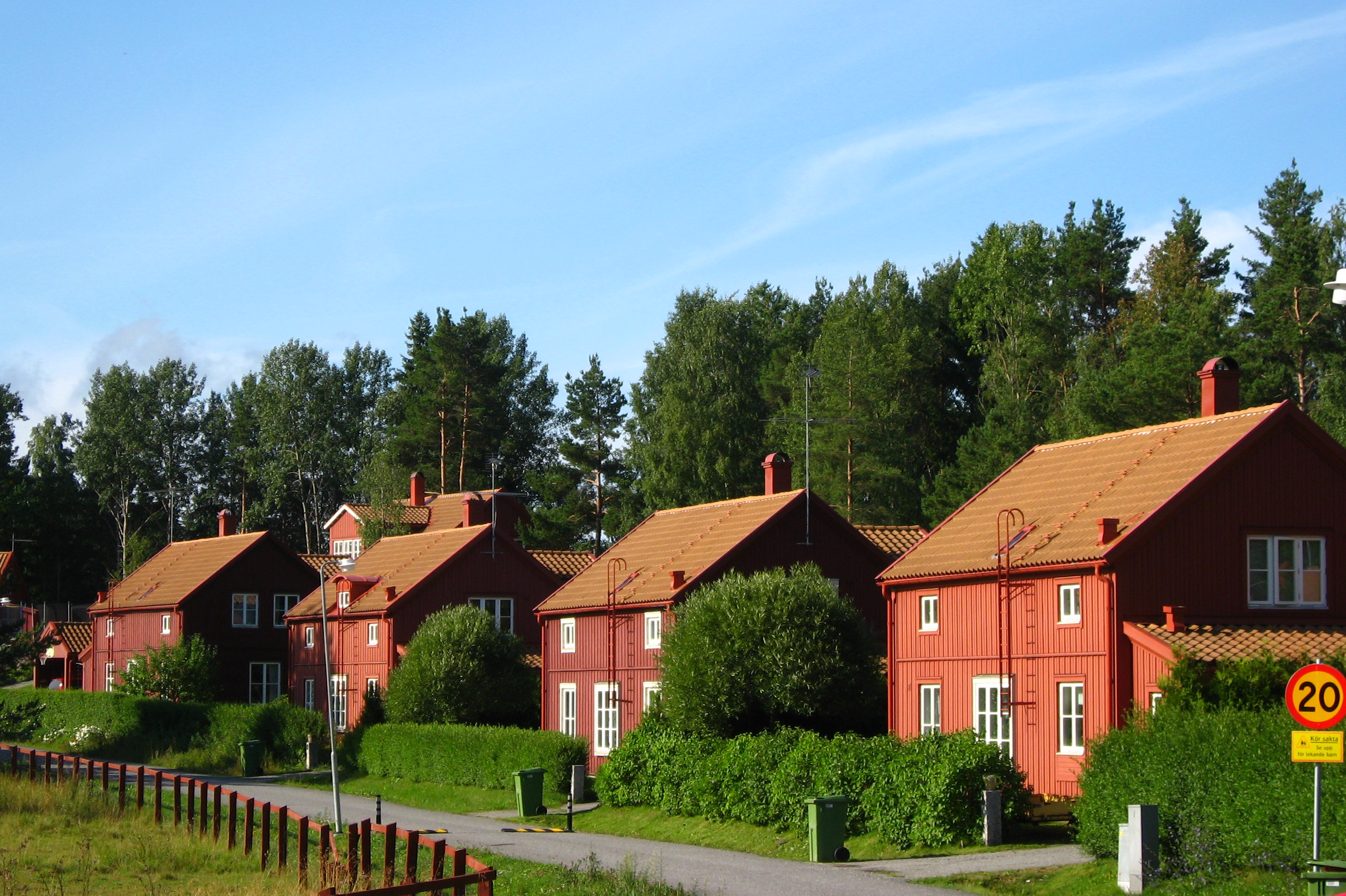

- Location within Stockholm Location within Sweden Location within European Union
- Coordinates: 59°01′39″N 17°55′53″E
- Country: Sweden
- Province: Södermanland
- County: Stockholm County
- Municipality: Nynäshamn Municipality

Area
  - Total: 0.56 km^{2} (0.22 sq mi)

Population (31 December 2020)
  - Total: 765
  - Density: 1,400/km^{2} (3,500/sq mi)
- Time zone: UTC+1 (CET)
  - Summer (DST): UTC+2 (CEST)

Segersäng is a locality situated in Nynäshamn Municipality, Stockholm County, Sweden with 608 inhabitants in 2010.

== Stockholms Lokaltrafik ==
As a municipality in Stockholm County it has a train station for commuter trains of Storstockholms Lokaltrafik connecting line 42/43 all the way to Nynäshamn, in addition it connects from Hemfosa.
