= Burseryd =

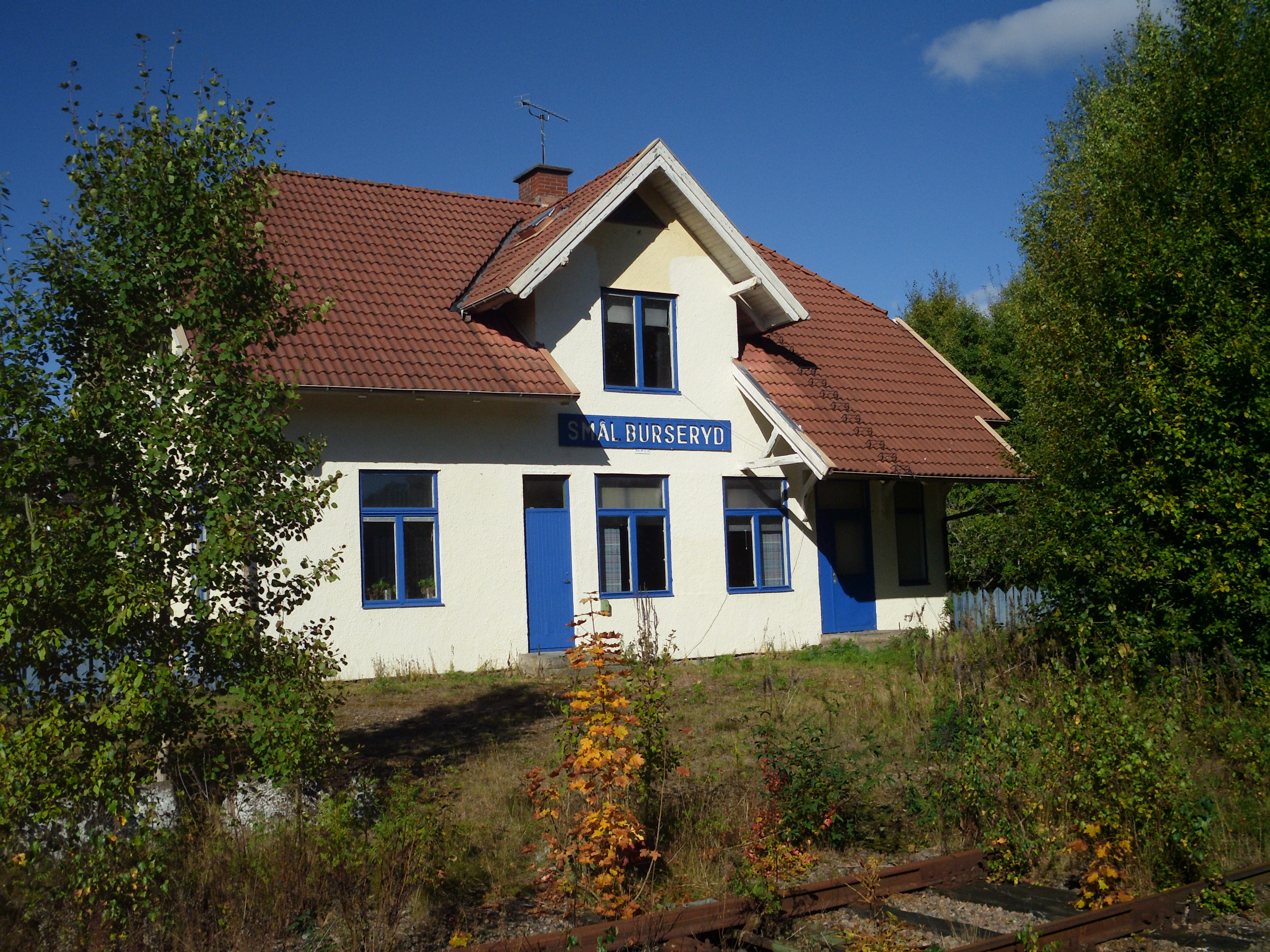
- Former train station

- Location within Jönköping Location within Sweden
- Coordinates: 57°12′N 13°17′E
- Country: Sweden
- Province: Småland
- County: Jönköping County
- Municipality: Gislaved Municipality

Area
  - Total: 1.56 km^{2} (0.60 sq mi)

Population (31 December 2010)
  - Total: 854
  - Density: 548/km^{2} (1,420/sq mi)
- Time zone: UTC+1 (CET)
  - Summer (DST): UTC+2 (CEST)
- Climate: Cfb

Burseryd (Swedish pronunciation: [ˈbɵ̂ʂːɛˌryːd]) is a locality situated in Gislaved Municipality, Jönköping County, Sweden with 854 inhabitants in 2010.
