= Bengt-Anders Johansson =

Swedish politician (born 1951)

Member of the Riksdag
- In office 30 September 2002 – 29 September 2014
- Constituency: Jönköping County

Mayor of Gislaved Municipality
- In office 1 January 1992 – 31 December 1994
- Preceded by: Kjell Magnusson
- Succeeded by: Agne Sahlin

Personal details
- Born: 7 March 1951 (age 75) Villstad parish, Jönköping County, Sweden
- Party: Moderate Party

Bengt-Anders Johansson (born 7 March 1951) is a Swedish politician of the Moderate Party. He was Member of the Riksdag from 2002 to 2014, representing his home constituency of Jönköping County. Prior to his service in the Riksdag, Johansson was municipal commissioner of Gislaved Municipality from 1992 to 2002 and its mayor from 1992 to 1994.

== Career ==
In the Riksdag, Johansson served as member of the Committee on Environment and Agriculture from 2002 to 2010 and as deputy chairman from 2010 to 2014. He was also member of the Committee on European Union Affairs from 2006 to 2010 and from 2012 to 2014, and a member of the War Delegation from 2010 to 2014. Johansson was the Moderate Party's spokesperson on policies regarding hunting and predator issues during his last term in the Riksdag and served as the chairman of the Riksdags's hunting and fishing club. He is a member of the Swedish Hunters' Association.

Johansson declined re-election in the 2014 election and left the Riksdag after the election. He served as member of The Election Review Board from February 2015 to March 2023.
