= Gislaved Municipality =

Gislaved Municipality Gislaveds kommun
- Municipality
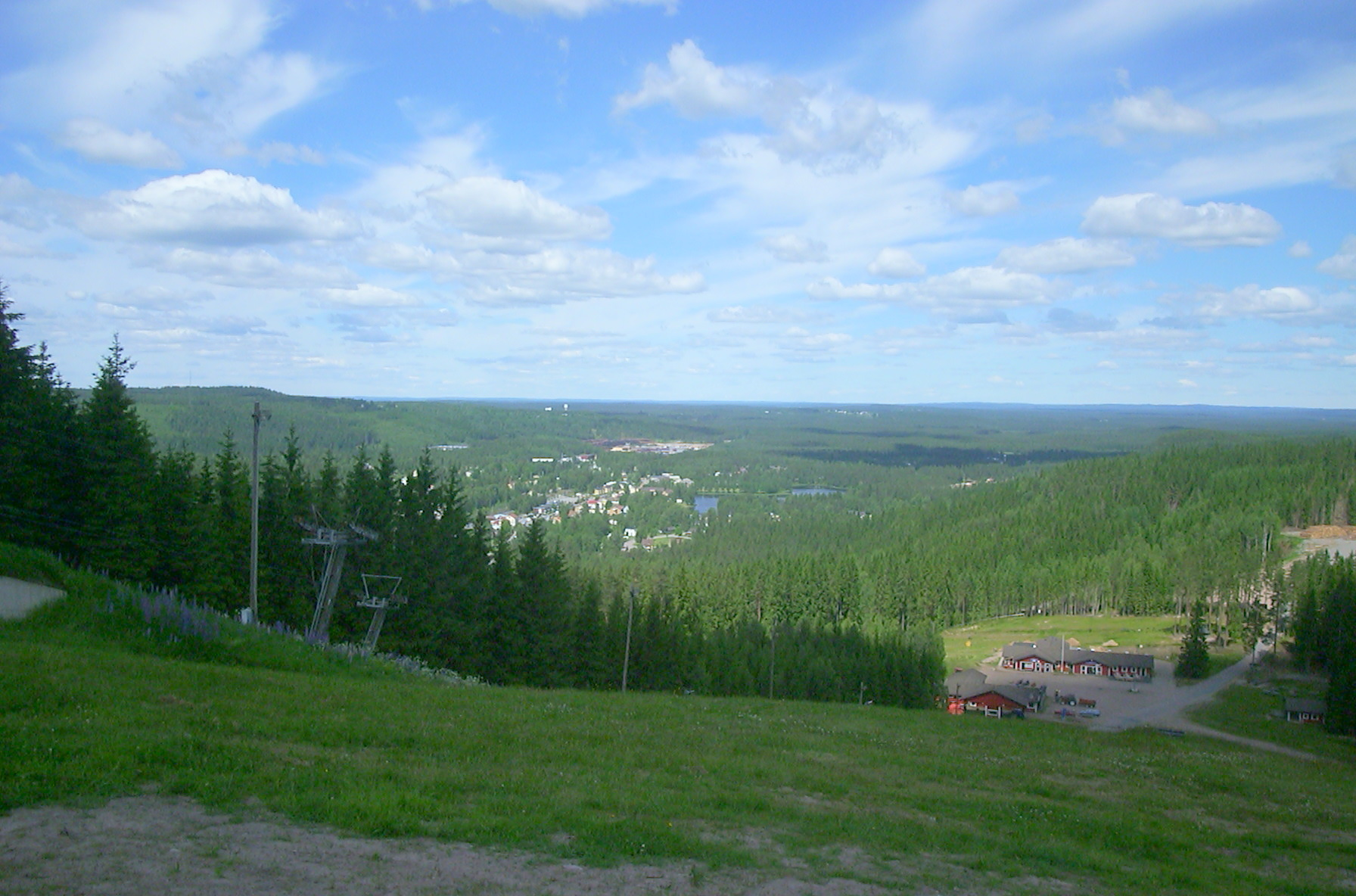

- Coat of arms

- Coordinates: 57°18′N 13°32′E
- Country: Sweden
- County: Jönköping County
- Seat: Gislaved

Government
  - Type: Council-manager
  - Mayor: Anton Sjödell (Moderate)
  - Manager: Stefan Eglinger

Area
  - Total: 1,220.72 km^{2} (471.32 sq mi)
  - Land: 1,137.08 km^{2} (439.03 sq mi)
  - Water: 83.64 km^{2} (32.29 sq mi)
- Area as of 1 January 2014.

Population (30 June 2025)
  - Total: 28,856
  - Density: 25.377/km^{2} (65.727/sq mi)
- Time zone: UTC+1 (CET)
  - Summer (DST): UTC+2 (CEST)
- ISO 3166 code: SE
- Province: Småland
- Municipal code: 0662
- Website: www.gislaved.se

Gislaved Municipality (Swedish: Gislaveds kommun) is a municipality in Jönköping County in southern Sweden, with its seat located in the town Gislaved.

The municipality was created in 1974, when Gislaved locality where amalgamated with the surrounding rural municipalities to form an entity of unitary type. There are seventeen original units making up the present municipality. Within Sweden, and as part of Gnosjö region, it's regarded as being both cultural and industrially dominated. The municipality is notably home to Scandinavian Raceway in Anderstorp, the only Swedish circuit to host a Formula One Grand Prix as it held the Swedish Grand Prix for six years in the 1970s.

== History ==
The municipality has been inhabited for a long time, but without any significant urban areas. At the turn of the 19th century it contained some 700 inhabitants. By 1949 it was eligible to receive rights as a köping, comparable to town rights. A coat of arms was designed for the occasion, traditionally used by the cities of Sweden. When the municipal reform was carried out in the 1970s, Gislaved adapted the still unused coat of arms as the municipal arms. The arms depict the insignia for a historical hostel nearby.

There are 19 churches in the municipality, the oldest from 1350. In the small town of Burseryd is a church bell that is even older. Its inscription was made with the Futhark alphabet and reads in translation "The year Anno Domine 1238 was this bell made. Bero wrote the inscription". It is today the second oldest church bell in Sweden.

== Geography ==
There are six nature reserves in the municipality. Rare plants and animals include the provincial flower the Twinflower (Linnaea borealis), the only flower named after the botanist Carl von Linné. Lake Bolmen lies in the south-east part of the municipality, with its main part in the Ljungby Municipality. It is the tenth largest lake in Sweden and offers fishing, canoeing and other nature activities.

Gislaved used to have a large tire factory under the same name as the town but it has shut down.

=== Localities ===
There are eight urban areas (also called a Tätort or locality) in Gislaved Municipality.

In the table the localities are listed according to the size of the population as of December 31, 2015. The municipal seat is in bold characters.

#	Locality	Population
1	**Gislaved**	10,180
2	Anderstorp	5,076
3	Smålandsstenar	4,564
4	Hestra	1,327
5	Reftele	1,289
6	Burseryd	932
7	Skeppshult	360
8	Broaryd	284

== Demographics ==
This is a demographic table based on Gislaved Municipality's electoral districts in the 2022 Swedish general election sourced from SVT's election platform, in turn taken from SCB official statistics.

In total there were 29,515 inhabitants, including 21,367 Swedish citizens of voting age. 41.4% voted for the left coalition and 57.7% for the right coalition. Indicators are in percentage points except population totals and income.

Location	Residents	Citizen adults	Left vote	Right vote	Employed	Swedish parents	Foreign heritage	Income SEK	Degree
Location			%	%					
Anderstorp C	1,647	1,194	36.1	63.4	89	78	22	28,347	29
Anderstorp N	1,947	1,445	38.6	60.7	81	65	35	25,019	25
Anderstorp S	1,778	1,176	38.9	59.2	80	55	45	25,251	27
Burseryd-Sandvik	1,400	1,019	40.4	59.0	81	78	22	24,926	24
Gislaved C	1,755	1,274	51.9	46.6	77	48	52	23,583	26
Gryteryd-S Hestra	925	677	29.2	69.9	89	86	14	26,417	23
Gullvivan	1,944	1,110	66.3	32.8	60	27	73	17,919	18
Gyllenfors-Hult	1,449	1,118	45.9	53.1	80	62	38	24,645	20
Henja	1,653	1,165	48.5	51.0	80	55	45	25,151	22
Lundåker	1,696	1,240	46.7	52.2	85	64	36	26,928	28
Norra Hestra	1,967	1,482	38.2	61.2	87	84	16	26,502	32
Reftele	1,947	1,474	36.8	62.2	86	81	19	26,970	24
Smålandsstenar C	2,228	1,531	39.9	59.5	82	67	33	26,715	28
Smålandsstenar V	1,970	1,505	39.0	60.0	86	73	27	25,953	26
Smålandsstenar Ö	1,615	1,158	35.9	63.0	80	66	34	25,059	22
Sörgården	1,798	1,374	42.3	56.6	89	73	27	28,288	33
Våthult-Bosebo	836	664	38.7	60.8	86	89	11	27,600	31
Ås-Kållerstad	960	761	33.0	66.9	91	92	8	28,355	25
Source: SVT

== Politics ==
=== Municipal council ===
Election	Party												Total seats	Turnout
Election	**V**	**S**	**MP**	**KP**	**MiG**	**WeP**	**MED**	**SD**	**C**	**L**	**KD**	**M**	Total seats	Turnout
1970	1	20							6	4	1	3	35	92.30%
1973	1	18							16	5	2	7	49	93.60%
1976	1	19							16	5	1	7	49	91.90%
1979	1	19							14	5	2	8	49	90.20%
1982	1	20		1					12	3	2	10	49	90.50%
1985	1	19		1					11	5	2	10	49	88.10%
1988	1	19	2	1					11	5	2	8	49	84.60%
1991	1	18	1	2					9	4	4	10	49	84.50%
1994		21	2	4					7	3	3	9	49	84.90%
1998	1	18	2	4					6	2	5	11	49	77.75%
2002	1	19	1	3					7	4	5	9	49	76.42%
2006	1	18	1	2				2	6	3	4	12	49	77.56%
2010	1	17	2	2				3	6	2	3	13	49	80.33%
2014	1	18	2	1				6	6	2	2	11	49	82.18%
2018	1	13	1	1		4		7	10	2	2	8	49	81.01%
2022	2	10			9	5		7	4	1	2	9	49	77.37%
2026	3	9			12	1	1	6	4	1	2	10	49	79.30%
Data from Statistics Sweden and Swedish Election Authority.

=== Mayors ===
==== List of mayors ====
Name and party		Period
C	Arvid Persson	1974–1977
C	Thage Mårtensson	1977–1987
C	Kjell Magnusson	1987–1991
M	Bengt-Anders Johansson	1991–1994
S	Agne Sahlin	1994–2006
M	Niclas Palmgren	2006–2014
S	Marie Johansson	2014–2018
C	Carina Johansson	2018–2022
S	Marie Johansson	2022–2024
M	Anton Sjödell	2025–

=== Timeline ===
Gislaved Municipality has for most of its history been governed by the centre-right parties, with the Centre Party heading the municipality from 1974 to 1991 and again since 2018. The Moderate Party headed the municipality from 1991 to 1994 and from 2006 to 2014 while the Social Democrats did so from 1994 to 2006 and again from 2014 to 2018. The Social Democrats have been the largest party in the council since its founding in 1974.

Gislaved Municipality is currently governed by a majority coalition between the Social Democrats, the Moderate Party, the Centre Party, the Westbo Party and the Liberal Party. The coalition is led by Anton Sjödell from the Moderate Party, who is also Mayor since 1 January 2025, and Niclas Palmgren from the Moderate Party who is President of the City Council. Ruth Johannesson from the local Civic Party in Gisalved heads the opposition.

== Notable people ==
Locality within Gislaved Municipality in parentheses.

- Ann-Charlotte Alverfors, author (Reftele)
- Darijan Bojanic, professional footballer (Gislaved)
- Johan Büser, politician (Anderstorp)
- Lars Danielsson, bassist, composer, and record producer (Smålandsstenar)
- Samuel Fröler, actor (Reftele)
- Oscar Hiljemark, professional footballer (Gislaved)
- Simon Hjalmarsson, professional ice hockey player (Gislaved)
- Bengt-Anders Johansson, politician (Smålandsstenar)
- Annie Oliv, model (Gislaved)
- Maria Rydqvist, cross-country skier (Smålandsstenar)
- Johan Runesson, orienteering competitor (Smålandsstenar)
- Henrik Skoog, distance runner (Smålandsstenar)
- Iréne Theorin, dramatic soprano opera singer (Broaryd)
- Åsa Westlund, politician (Anderstorp)

== Sights ==
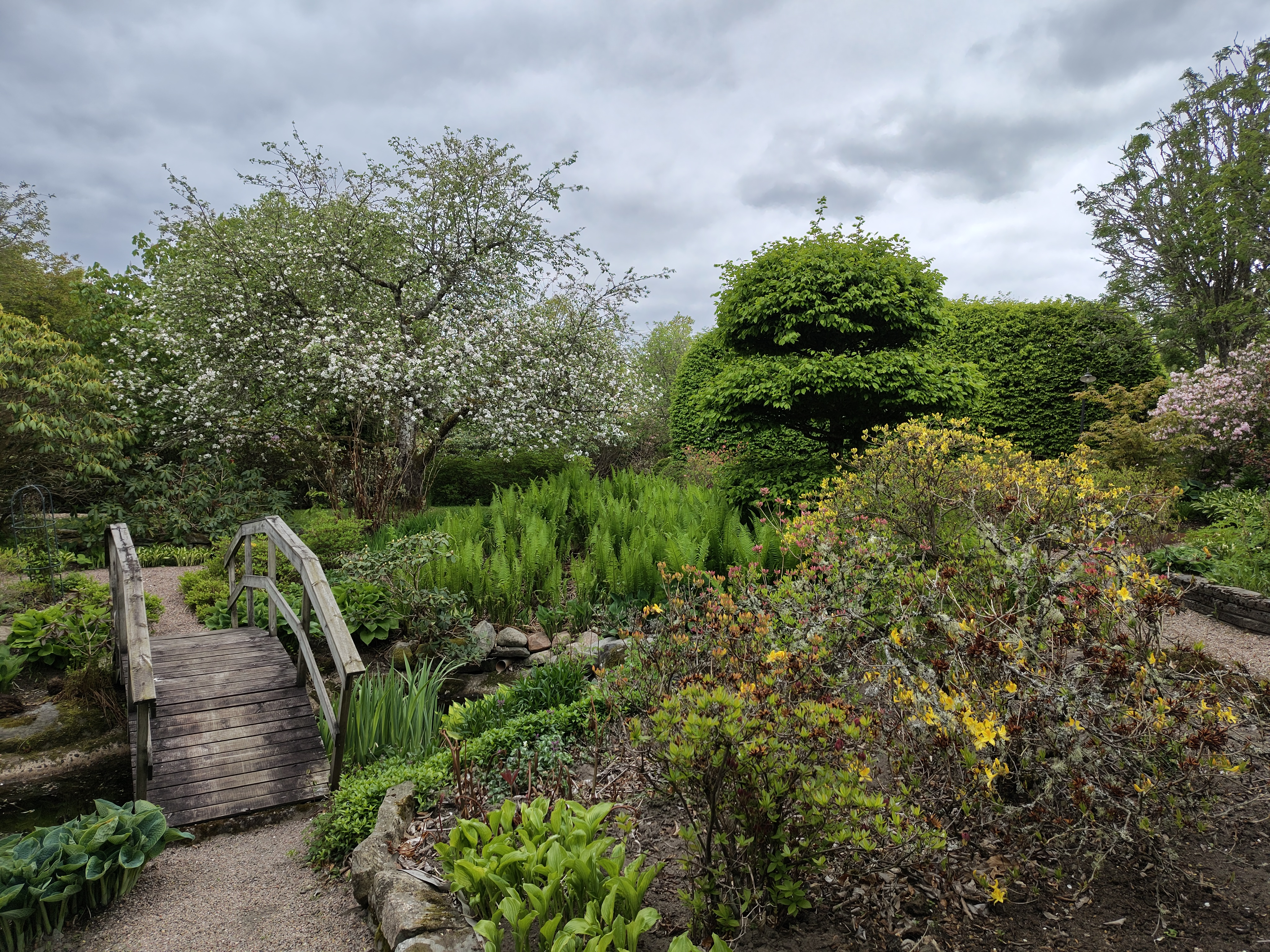
Kärrhults gård bothanical garden

The Scandinavian Raceway, near Anderstorp, was built in 1968.
