= Broaryd =

- Location within Jönköping Location within Sweden
- Coordinates: 57°07′N 13°15′E
- Country: Sweden
- Province: Småland
- County: Jönköping County
- Municipality: Gislaved Municipality

Area
  - Total: 0.69 km^{2} (0.27 sq mi)

Population (31 December 2010)
  - Total: 271
  - Density: 392/km^{2} (1,020/sq mi)
- Time zone: UTC+1 (CET)
  - Summer (DST): UTC+2 (CEST)
- Climate: Cfb

Broaryd is a locality situated in Gislaved Municipality, Jönköping County, Sweden with 271 inhabitants in 2010.

== Gallery ==
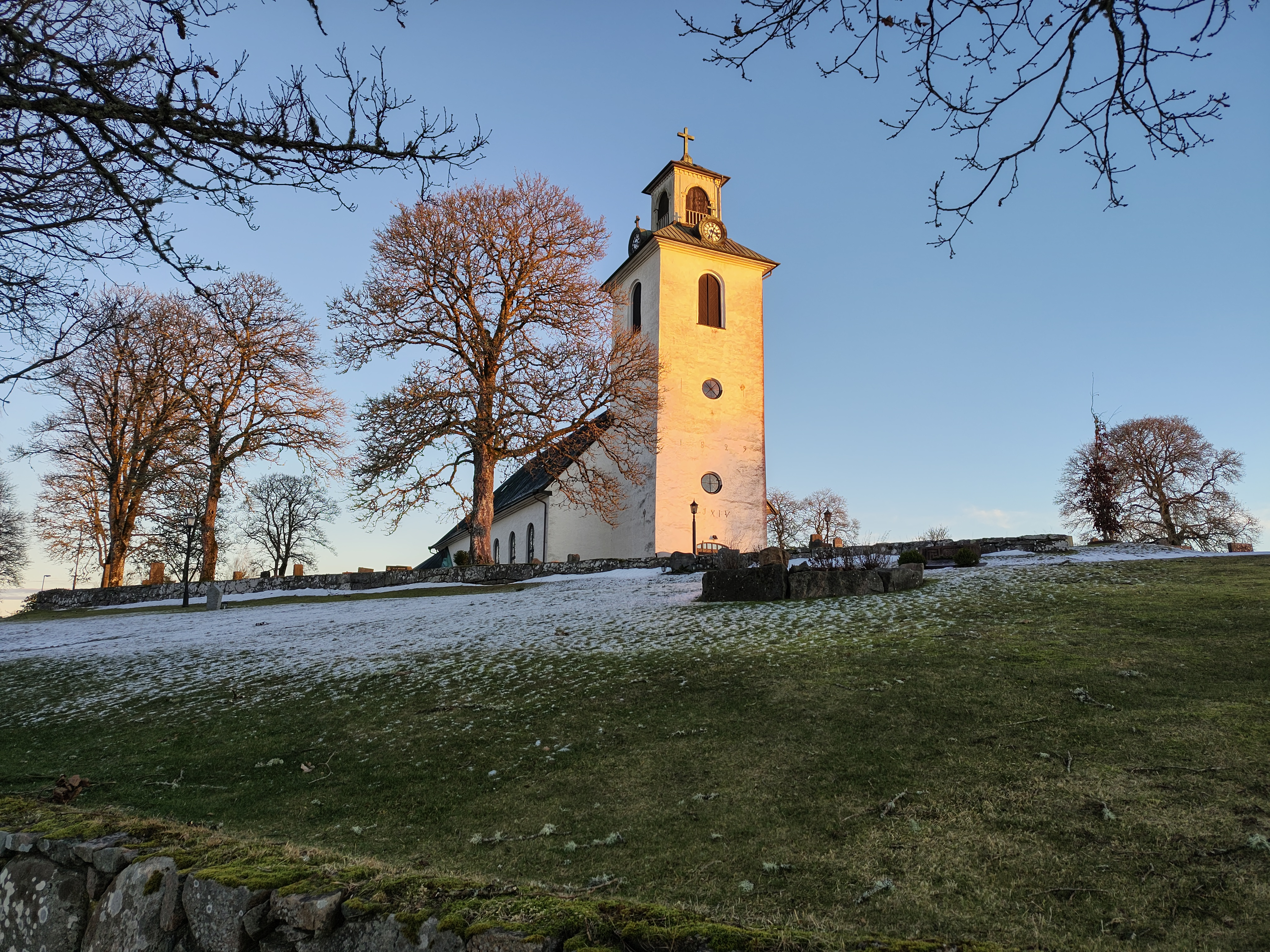
South Hestra Church

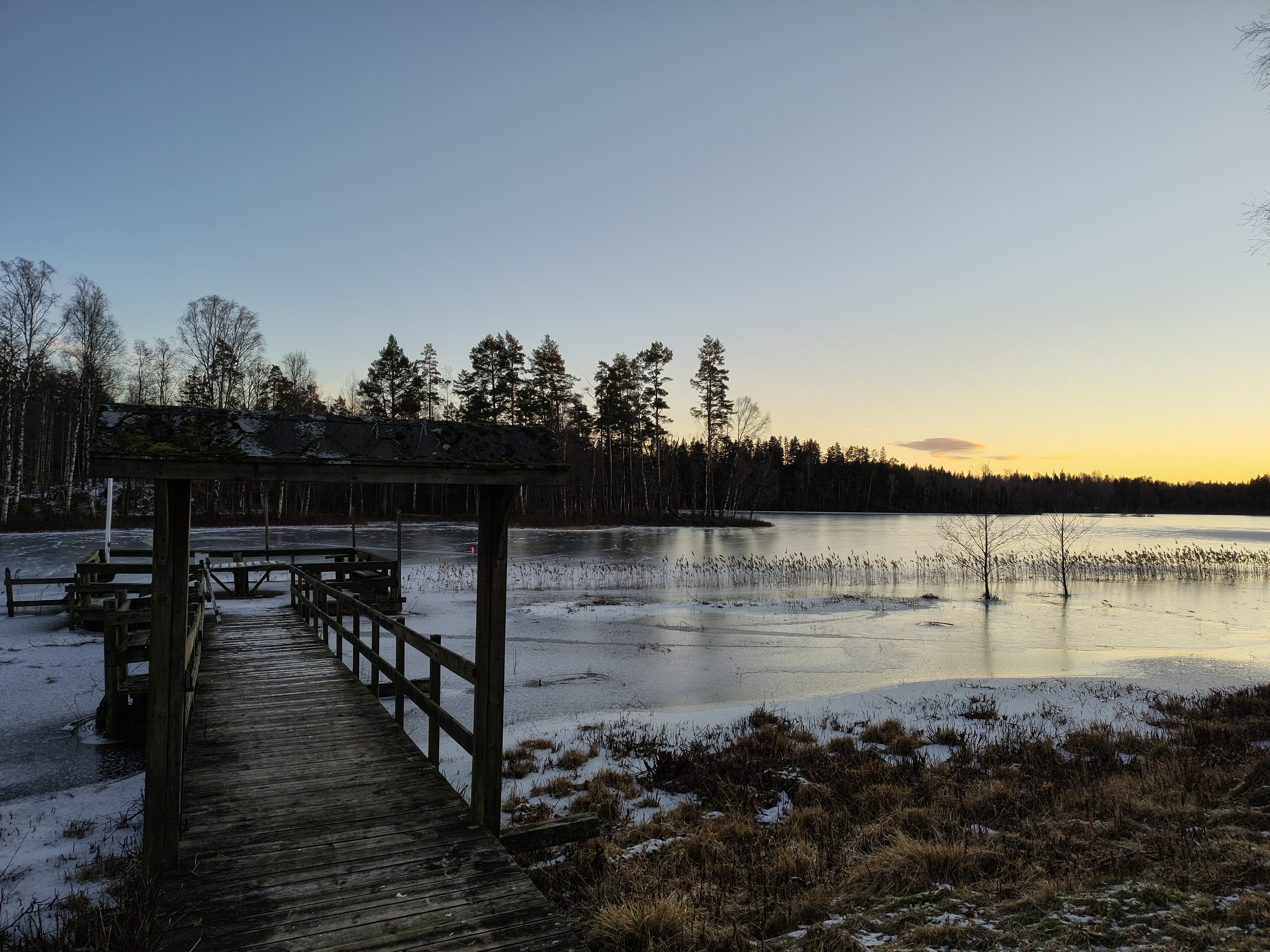
Hestra Lake

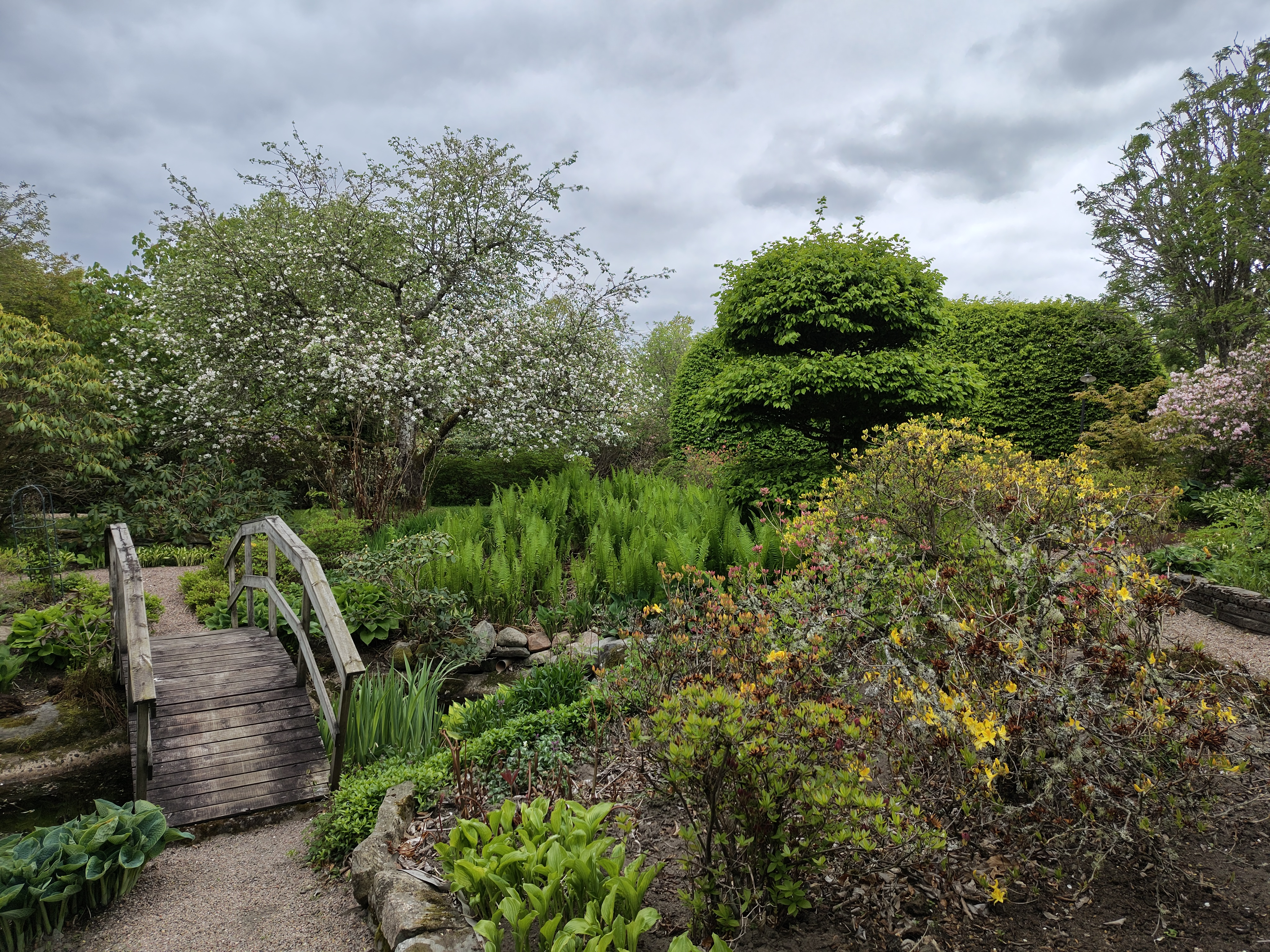
Kärrhults Gård botanical garden
