= Nynäshamn Municipality =

Nynäshamn Municipality Nynäshamns kommun
- Municipality
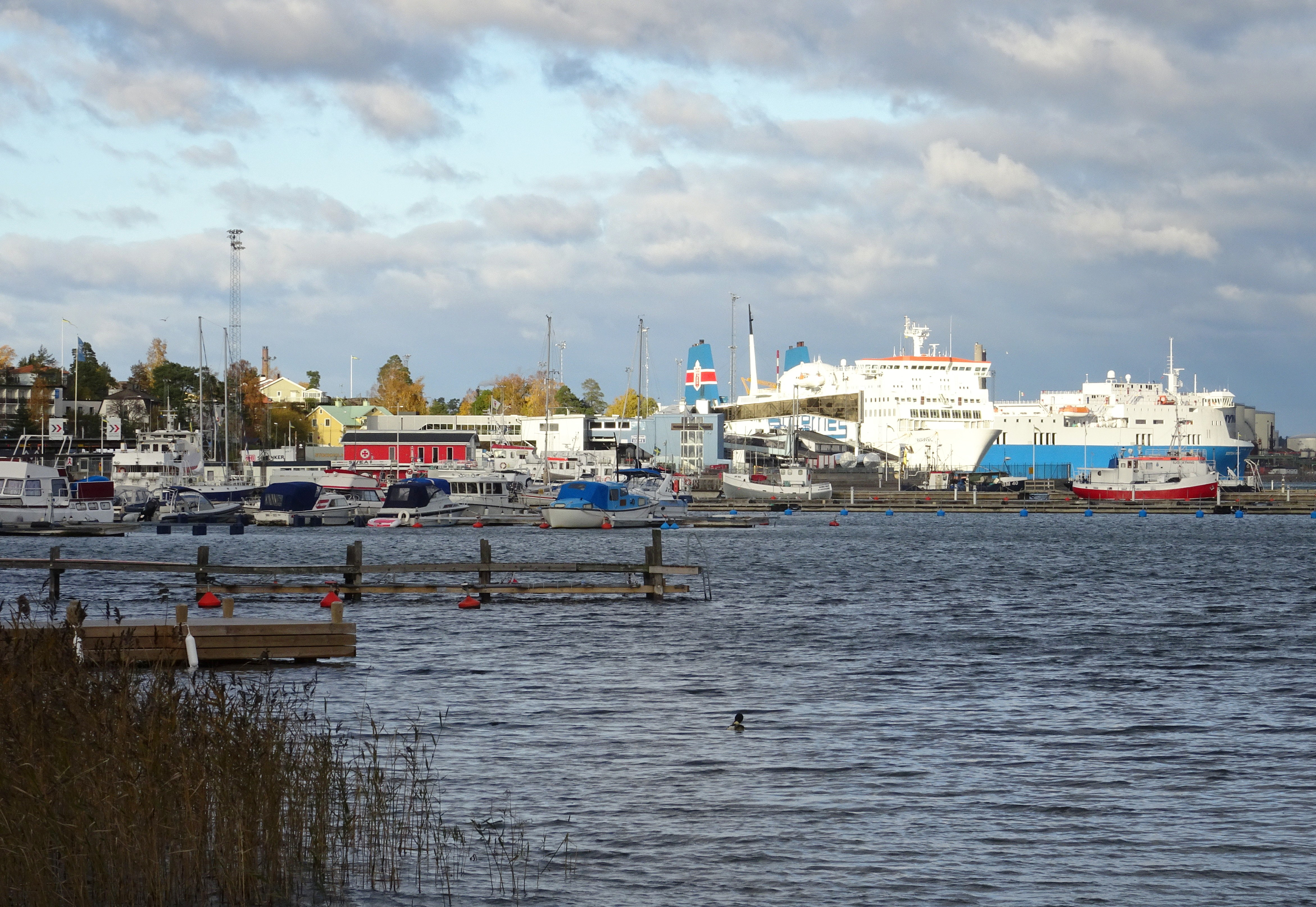

- Flag Coat of arms

- Coordinates: 58°54′N 17°57′E
- Country: Sweden
- County: Stockholm County
- Seat: Nynäshamn

Area
  - Total: 1,300.83 km^{2} (502.25 sq mi)
  - Land: 358.76 km^{2} (138.52 sq mi)
  - Water: 942.07 km^{2} (363.74 sq mi)
- Area as of 1 January 2014.

Population (30 June 2025)
  - Total: 30,605
  - Density: 85.308/km^{2} (220.95/sq mi)
- Time zone: UTC+1 (CET)
  - Summer (DST): UTC+2 (CEST)
- ISO 3166 code: SE
- Province: Södermanland
- Municipal code: 0192
- Website: www.nynashamn.se
- Density is calculated using land area only.

Nynäshamn Municipality (Swedish: Nynäshamns kommun) is a municipality in Stockholm County in east central Sweden. Its seat is located in the city of Nynäshamn.

In 1974 the former City of Nynäshamn (itself instituted in 1946) was merged with Ösmo, from which it had been detached as a market town (köping) in 1911 and Sorunda, all in the Södertörn peninsula and adjacent islands.

== Demography ==
=== Population development ===
Population development in Nynäshamn Municipality 1970–2019
Year	Population
1970	18,227
1975	19,100
1980	20,333
1985	20,857
1990	21,992
1995	22,786
2000	23,965
2005	24,648
2010	26,032
2015	27,500
2017	28,109
2019	28,575
Source: SCB - Folkmängd efter region och år.

=== 2022 by district ===
This is a demographic table based on Nynäshamn Municipality's electoral districts in the 2022 Swedish general election sourced from SVT's election platform, in turn taken from SCB official statistics.

In total there were 29,442 residents, including 21,526 Swedish citizens of voting age. 45.2% voted for the left coalition and 53.4% for the right coalition. Indicators are in percentage points except population totals and income.

Location	Residents	Citizen adults	Left vote	Right vote	Employed	Swedish parents	Foreign heritage	Income SEK	Degree
Location			%	%					
1 Sandhamn	1,126	843	48.3	50.7	87	84	16	28,235	36
2 Estö Ö	1,433	1,087	46.6	52.4	81	83	17	27,884	40
3 Estö V	1,563	1,158	52.4	46.3	79	79	21	26,721	39
4 Centrala Nynäs	2,066	1,617	52.5	46.9	78	77	23	23,699	35
5 Gröndal	1,084	764	50.8	47.2	71	65	35	21,286	29
7 Via	1,855	1,558	53.7	45.0	80	83	17	23,203	33
8 Kullsta	1,182	951	45.5	52.5	82	83	17	26,045	32
9 Nicksta	2,360	1,301	57.4	40.4	68	41	59	20,466	30
10 Vaktberget	2,009	1,518	45.8	51.4	78	59	41	23,661	36
11 Hacktorp	1,146	891	49.3	49.2	88	86	14	30,381	34
13 Ösmo V	1,812	1,253	44.4	54.3	76	69	31	25,347	31
14 Ösmo Ö	1,835	1,125	47.5	51.4	77	58	42	24,617	28
15 Ösmo S	1,634	1,213	41.1	57.1	82	80	20	26,501	29
16 Ösmo N	1,691	1,195	38.3	60.7	87	87	13	33,618	40
17 Torö	621	521	38.8	60.8	82	88	12	28,122	31
18 Sorunda S	1,892	1,407	37.3	61.9	81	81	19	26,278	26
19 M Sorunda	1,906	1,408	34.9	63.0	83	87	13	26,536	27
20 Sorunda N	2,227	1,716	34.5	64.3	87	84	16	29,668	30
Source: SVT

=== Residents with a foreign background ===
On 31 December 2017 the number of people with a foreign background (persons born outside of Sweden or with two parents born outside of Sweden) was 6 082, or 21.64% of the population (28 109 on 31 December 2017). On 31 December 2002 the number of residents with a foreign background was (per the same definition) 3 178, or 12.96% of the population (24 528 on 31 December 2002). On 31 December 2017 there were 28 109 residents in Nynäshamn, of which 4 849 people (17.25%) were born in a country other than Sweden. Divided by country in the table below - the Nordic countries as well as the 12 most common countries of birth outside of Sweden for Swedish residents have been included, with other countries of birth bundled together by continent by Statistics Sweden.

Country of birth
31 December 2017
1	Sweden	23,260
2	Poland	745
3	European Union: Other countries	722
4	Finland	675
5	Asia: Other countries	414
6	Africa: Other countries	302
7	Europe outside of the EU: other countries	216
8	Iraq	208
9	Syria	171
10	South America	165
11	Thailand	153
12	Iran	143
13	Turkey	139
14	Somalia	128
15	Yugoslavia/Yugoslavia; SFR Yugoslavia/Serbia and Montenegro	101
16	Germany	99
17	Afghanistan	92
18	Norway	83
19	North America	82
20	Bosnia and Herzegovina	69
21	Denmark	53
22	Eritrea	48
23	Soviet Union	18
24	Oceania	15
25	Iceland	5
26	Unknown country of birth	3

== Localities ==
- Grödby
- Nynäshamn (seat)
- Stora Vika
- Sorunda
- Ösmo

== Public transportation ==
As all municipalities in Stockholm County Nynäshamn is served by the public transport system operated by SL. There are a number of stations of Stockholm commuter rail as well as a bus network in the municipality.

There are car- and passenger ferries to the Swedish island Gotland and to Poland and Latvia.

There are over 1,800 islands and islets in the municipality. The Draget Canal allows boats to traverse the municipality from west to east without needing to pass offshore of the Landsort peninsular. Nynäshamn boasts sandy beaches, areas suitable for long walks, for riding horses and for bicycling, all popular activities. The municipality may have one of the most varying natures in the county, as it allows both activities related to the Stockholm archipelago, such as boat tours, as well as boggy grounds, agricultural areas, urban areas and even forests with elk and deer.

Its history is traced several thousands of years back. About 50 historical remains are considered notable enough to be marked on maps and attract visitors. They include both grave fields from the Iron Age, runestones from the Viking Age as well as newer curiosities such as 18th century farms and cottages.

== Notable people ==
- Kent Nilsson, retired NHL hockey player
- Erik Gustafsson, NHL player for the Detroit Red Wings

== See also ==
- Ören Nature Reserve
