= Tungelsta railway station =

Railway station in Haninge, Sweden

Tungelsta
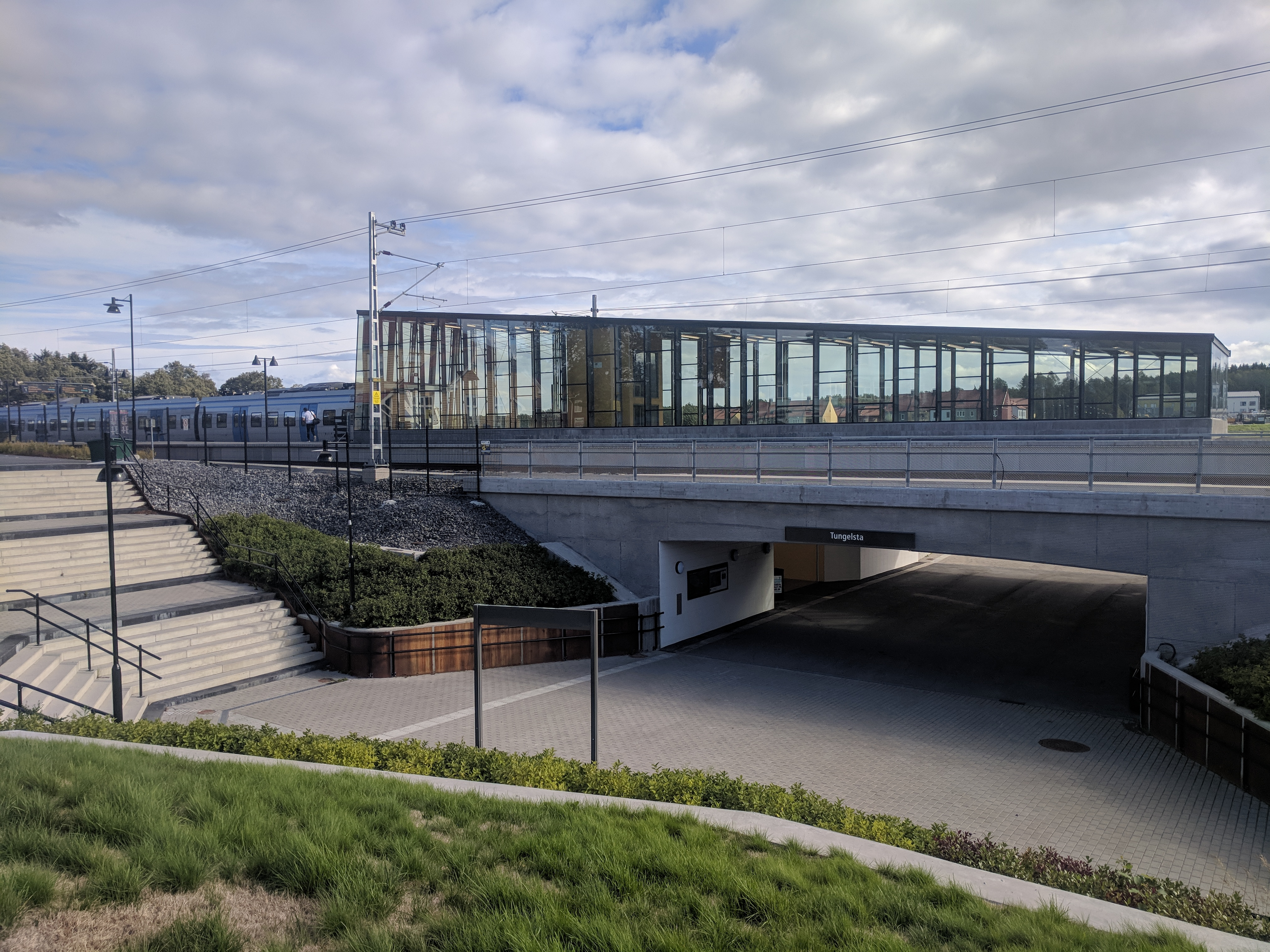
- Tungelsta station in 2018

General information
- Location: Stockholm County
- Coordinates: 59°6′9″N 18°2′43″E
- System: Pendeltåg
- Owner: Swedish Transport Administration
- Platforms: 1 island platform
- Tracks: 2

Construction
- Structure type: At-grade
- Accessible: Yes

Other information
- Station code: Ts

History
- Opened: 1901
- Rebuilt: 2012

Passengers
- 2015: 400 boarding per weekday (2015) (commuter rail)

Services
Preceding station	Stockholm commuter rail	Following station
Krigslida towards Bålsta	43	Hemfosa towards Nynäshamn
Location

Tungelsta is a station on Stockholm's commuter rail network, located in the locality of Tungelsta within Haninge Municipality. It is situated on the Nynäs Line. The station was originally opened in 1901. On December 3, 2012, the station was expanded when the double track between Västerhaninge and Tungelsta was completed, followed by the double track between Tungelsta and Hemfosa in December 2016. As of 2015, approximately 400 passengers boarded trains at Tungelsta each weekday.

== History ==
Tungelsta Station opened in 1901. The original station building was designed by architect Ferdinand Boberg and features elements characteristic of early 20th-century railway architecture.

Originally built in a rural area, the station facilitated the development of market gardening by providing transport access to Stockholm. This led to the establishment of over 100 market gardens in Tungelsta during the early to mid-20th century, specialising in the cultivation of flowers and vegetables for sale in the capital.

Following the Second World War, residential development in the area increased, while the number of market gardens decreased.

=== 1907 train robbery ===
In November 1907, following a train robbery near Barkarby, two men stole a locked cash chest containing approximately 9,000 kronor from a train travelling from Köping to Stockholm. One of the perpetrators, Karl Edvin Hansson, attempted to flee via Tungelsta Station. When confronted by police officer Waldén, Hansson attacked the officer and fled towards Västerhaninge, leaving behind a package with over 8,800 kronor in stolen cash. He was captured near Handen while attempting to escape on a railway handcar. Hansson and his accomplice, Henning Johansson, were later convicted of the crime.

== Connections ==
During peak hours, two trains per hour run in each direction between Bålsta/Kallhäll and Nynäshamn. At other times, only two trains per hour operate. Bus connections are available to Västerhaninge and other parts of the municipality. The travel time by commuter train to Stockholm is approximately 30–40 minutes.

The station is remotely controlled from Stockholm's train control center. The interlocking system is a computer-based model called Ställverk 85.

The following buses serve Tungelsta station:

- 835 Tungelsta (Lillgården) - Länna/Vega (Vardövägen)
- 893 Tungelsta (Lillgården) - Sergels torg

At Tungelsta school, bus 848 also stops (Västerhaninge - Tungelsta - Västerby - Sorunda - Stora Vika - Nynäshamn).

== Gallery ==
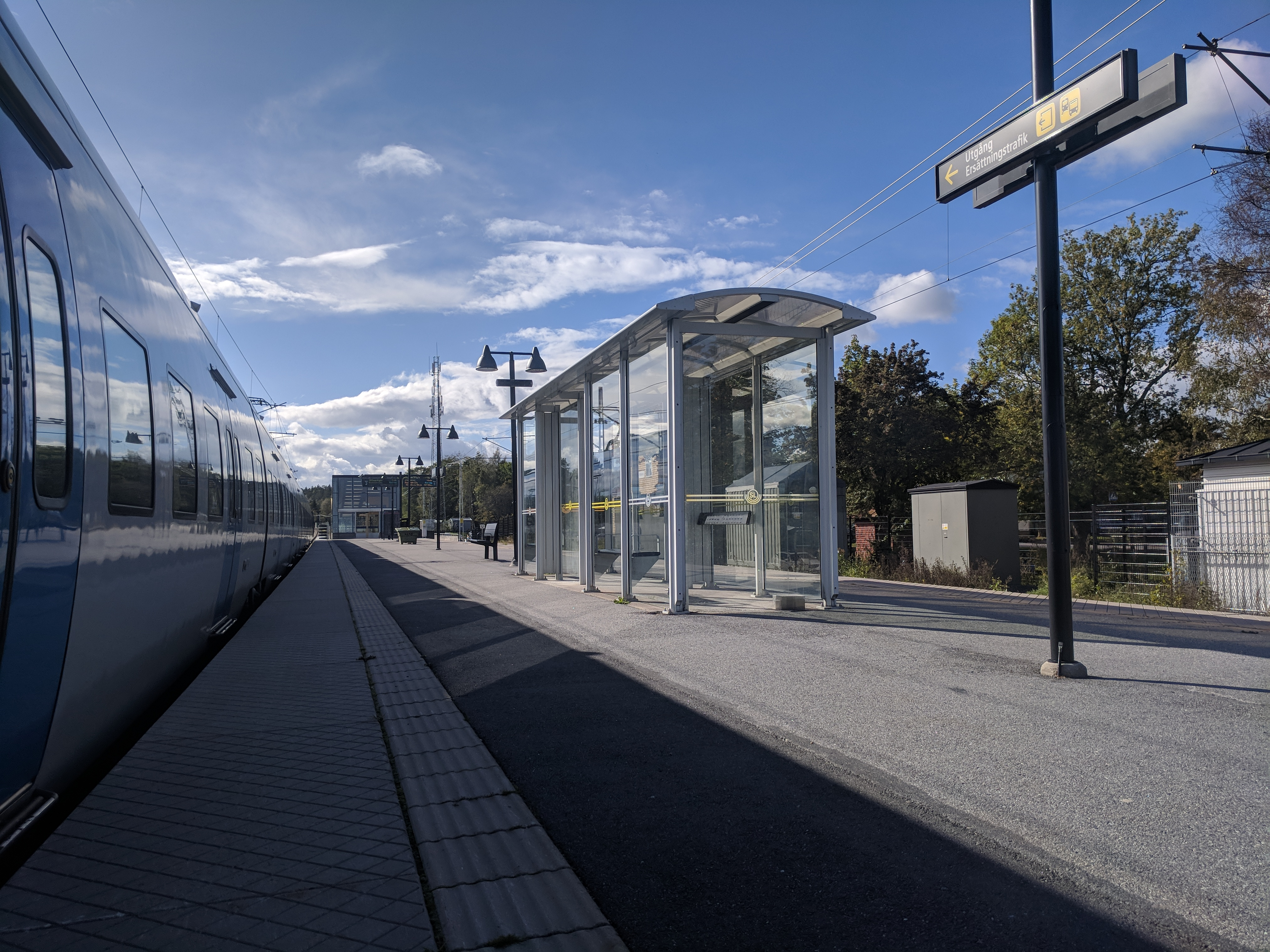
Platform with a commuter train at the station

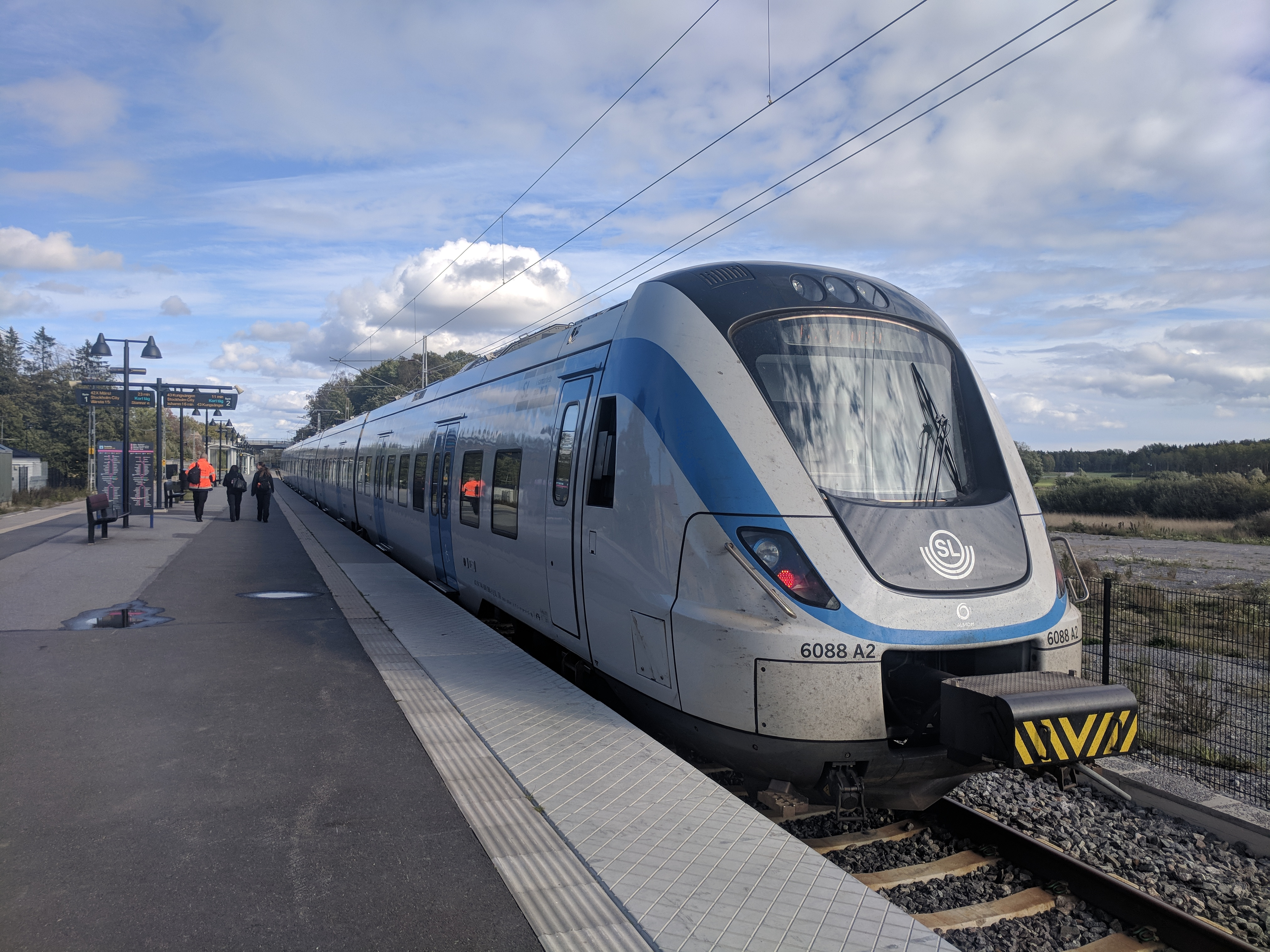
Commuter train at the station

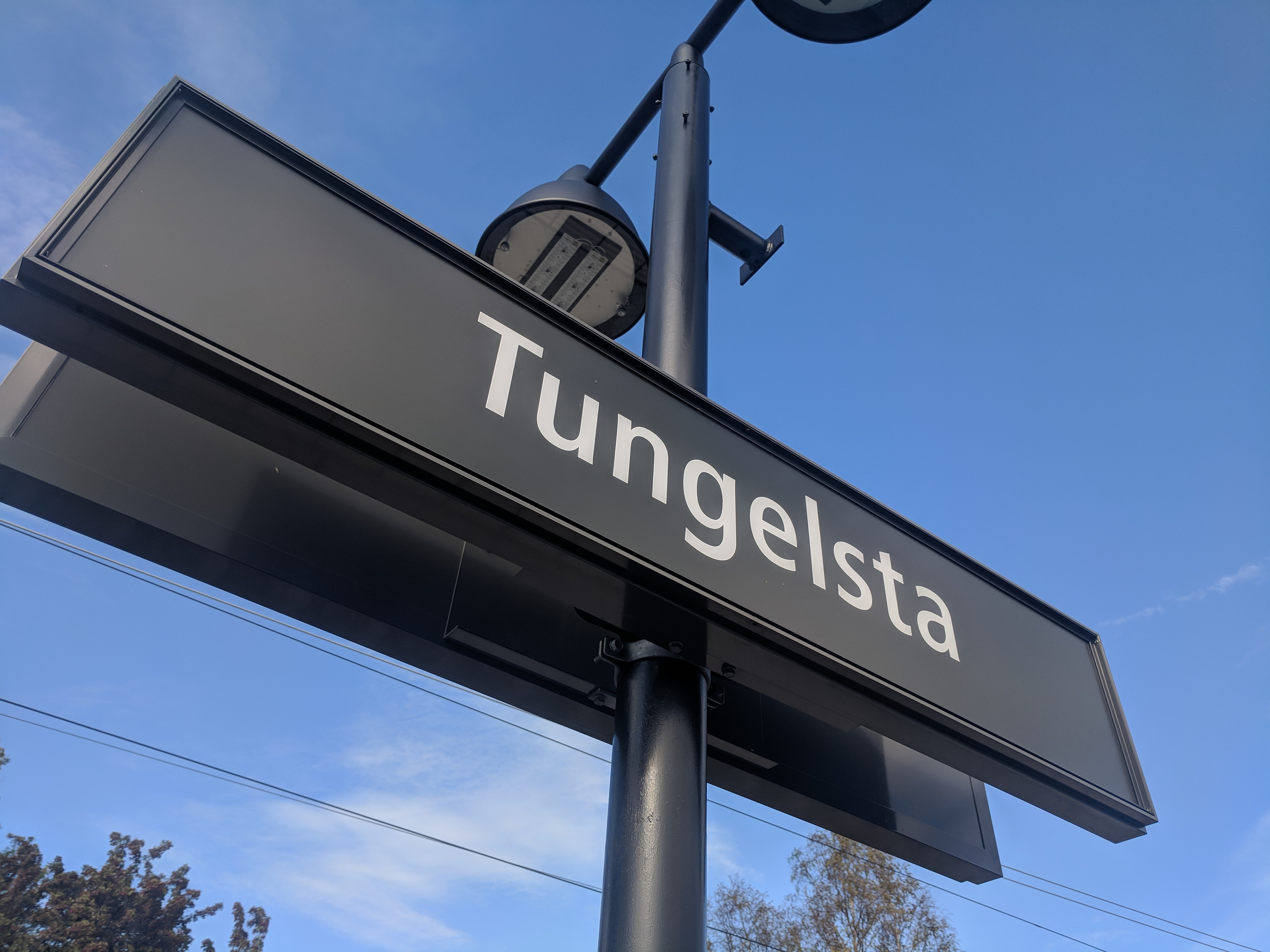
Station sign

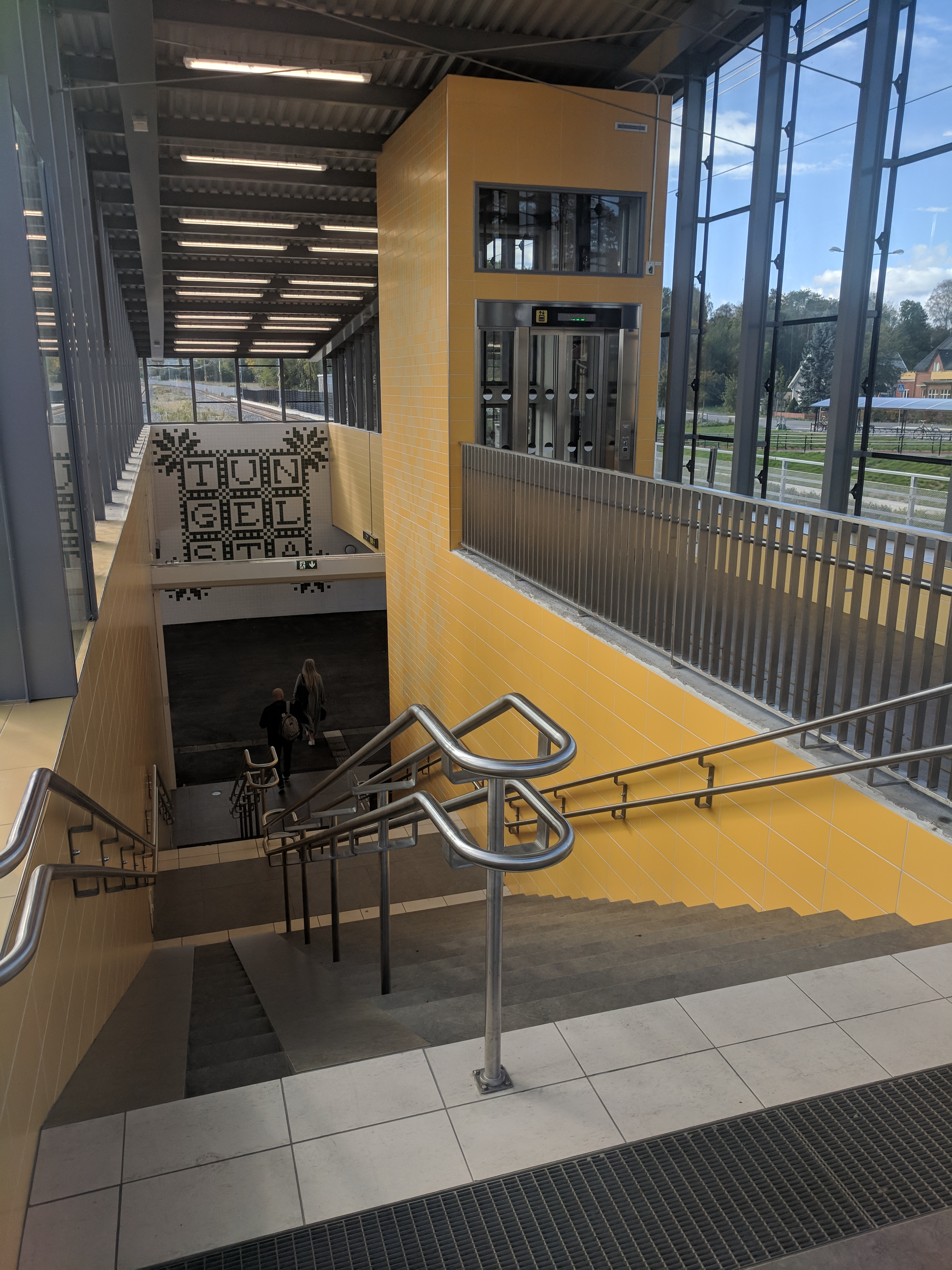
Entrance

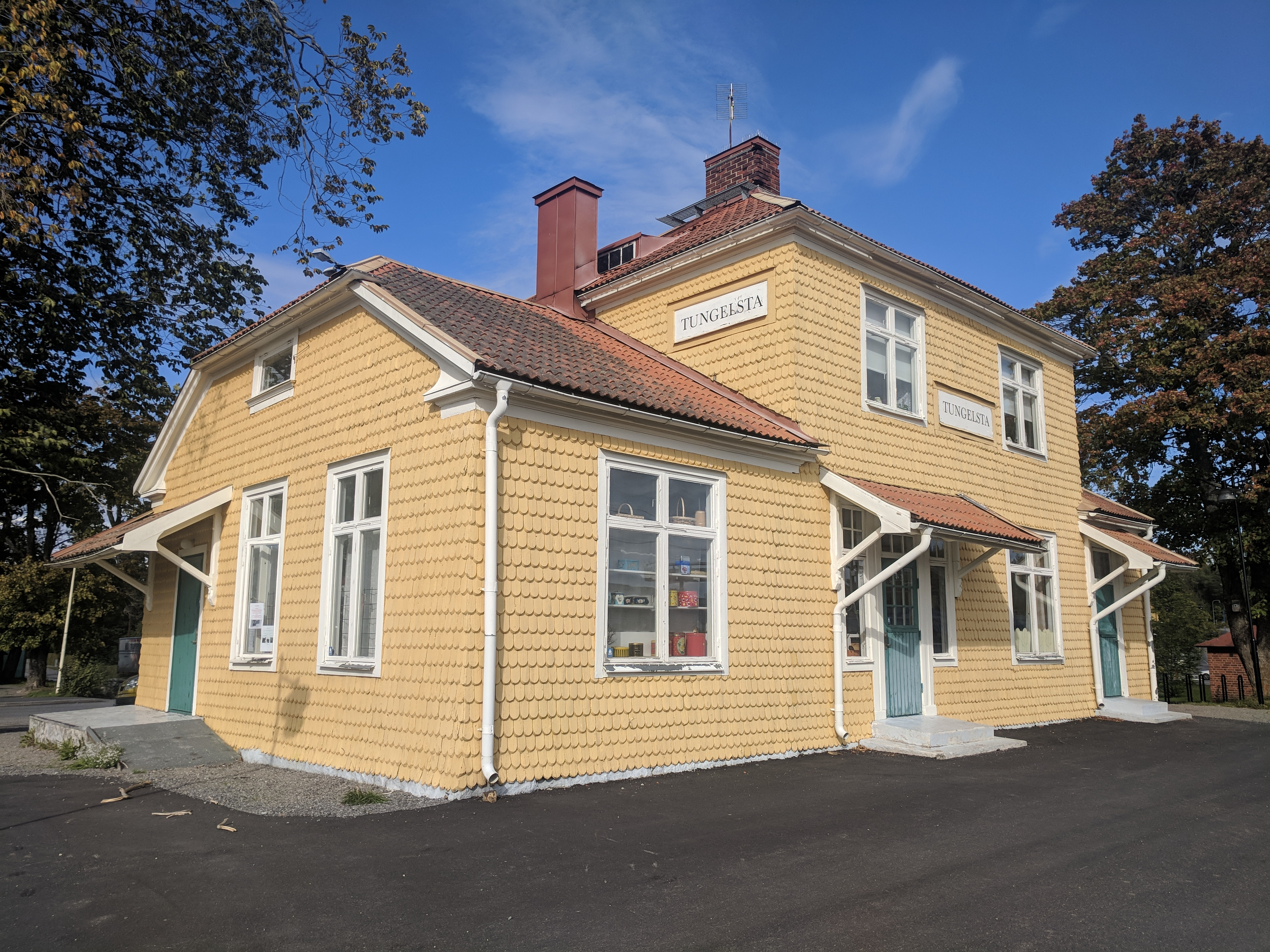
Old station building

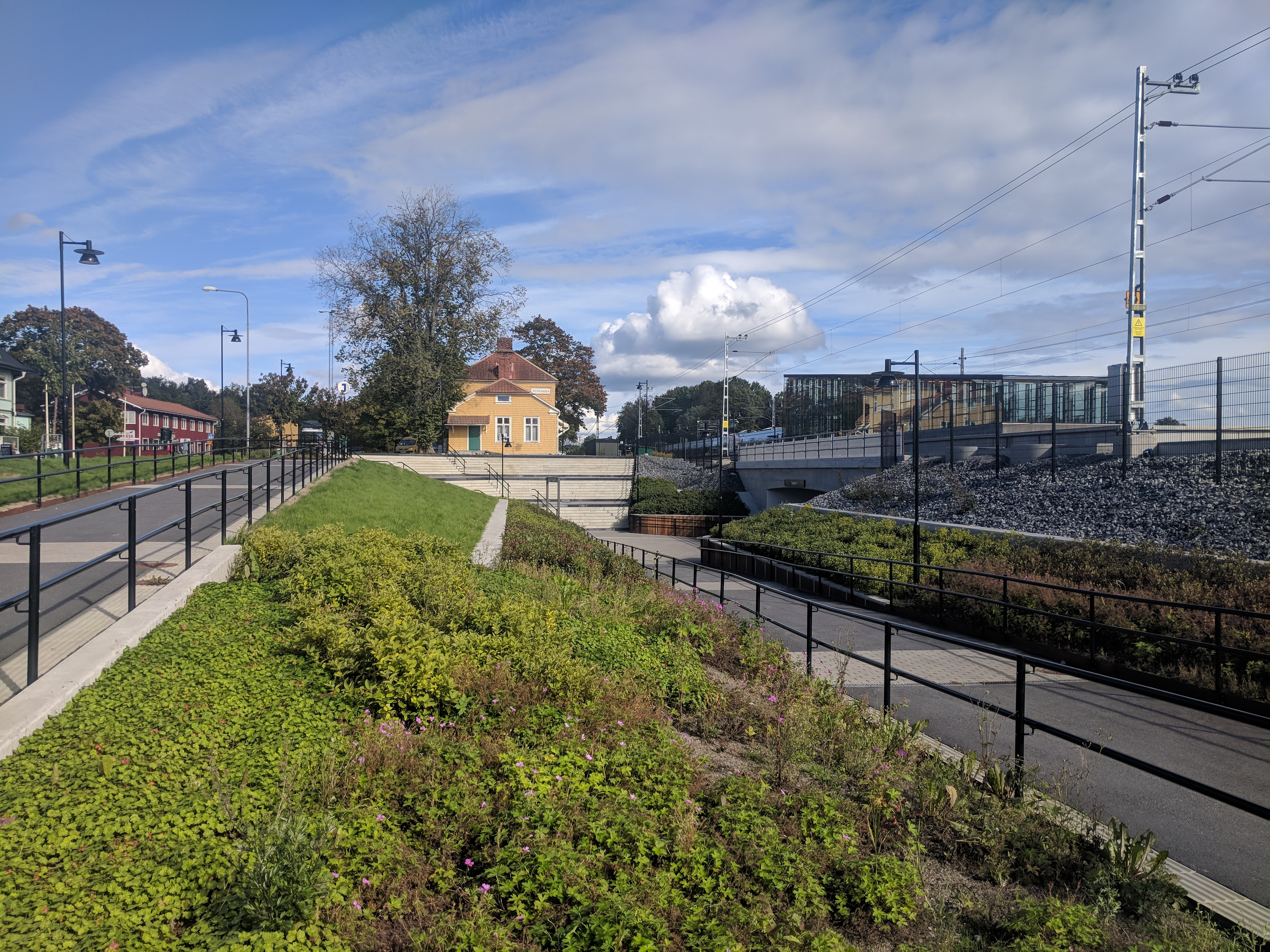
Station area
