= List of Dhammakaya branches =

List of international branch centres of the Thai Buddhist Dhammakaya tradition

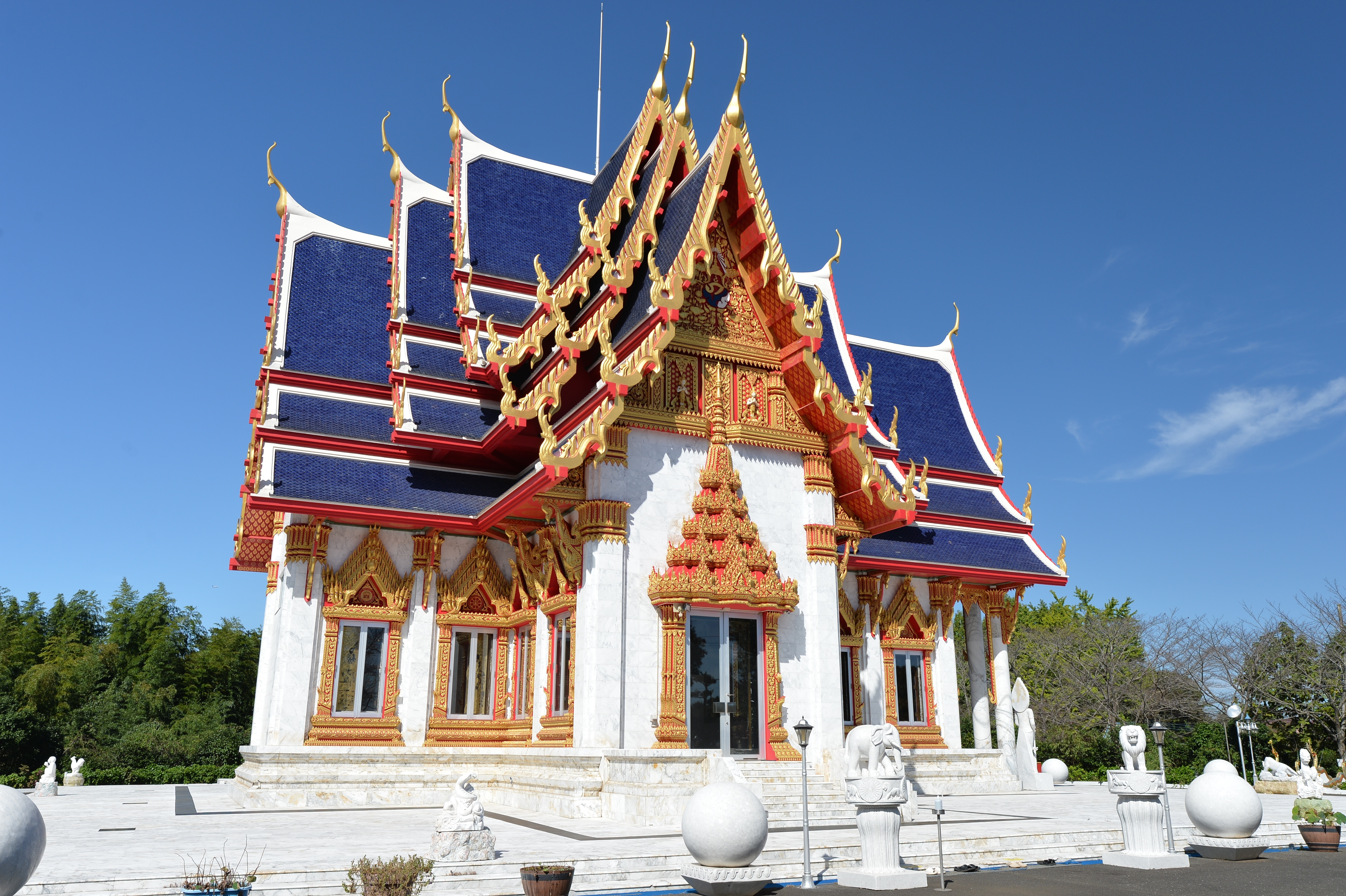
The ubosot of Wat Paknam Japan, a branch temple in Narita, Chiba Prefecture, Japan

The Dhammakaya tradition, a Thai Buddhist tradition associated with Luang Pu Sodh Candasaro and Dhammakaya meditation, has developed a network of international branch temples, meditation centres and Buddhist associations. Overseas branches are chiefly associated with several Thai temples in the tradition, including Wat Paknam Bhasicharoen, the Bangkok temple where Luang Pu Sodh served as abbot; Wat Phra Dhammakaya, a large temple in Pathum Thani province founded in 1970 by Chandra Khonnokyoong and Luang Por Dhammajayo; and Wat Luang Phor Sodh Dhammakayaram, a temple in Ratchaburi province associated with the same meditation lineage.

The branches listed here include temples, registered Buddhist associations, meditation centres and coordination centres that are identified in branch lists, Thai Buddhist missionary directories, official temple or centre websites, or published news coverage. Names vary by source: some centres use the Thai word wat ('temple'), while others use English-language names such as "Meditation Center" or "Meditation Centre".

== Background and scope ==
Wat Paknam Bhasicharoen is a royal wat in Phasi Charoen district, Bangkok. The temple was transformed after Luang Pu Sodh became abbot in 1916, growing from an almost abandoned temple with thirteen monks into a major centre of Buddhist education and meditation practice with hundreds of monks and mae chi. It is widely identified as the origin of the Dhammakaya tradition.

Wat Phra Dhammakaya is a Buddhist temple in Khlong Luang district, Pathum Thani province, north of Bangkok. Thai and international sources describe it as the best-known and fastest-growing temple of the Dhammakaya tradition; its foundation and affiliated branch lists describe overseas centres in multiple regions.

Wat Luang Phor Sodh Dhammakayaram is a Thai Buddhist temple in Ratchaburi province associated with the Dhammakaya meditation tradition. Overseas centres connected with the temple are listed separately where published sources identify them as branches or affiliated centres.

For the purposes of this list, an international branch is an overseas temple, meditation centre, registered Buddhist association or coordination centre that is explicitly associated in published sources with Wat Paknam Bhasicharoen, Wat Phra Dhammakaya or Wat Luang Phor Sodh Dhammakayaram. The list excludes domestic Thai temples and informal meditation groups unless they are identified as official overseas branches or centres in published sources. Names are given in the English form used by the source where available; alternative names, older names and local-language forms are noted only where they help identify the centre. The list is organised first by associated Thai parent temple and then by region and country.

The reference column normally gives the source that verifies the branch entry. The notes column is reserved for points that affect identification, such as alternative names, former names, notable premises, establishment dates or independent coverage; ordinary branch-list entries are left without additional notes.

== Wat Paknam Bhasicharoen branches ==
Wat Paknam Bhasicharoen has established or supported overseas branch temples in Asia, Europe, North America and Oceania.

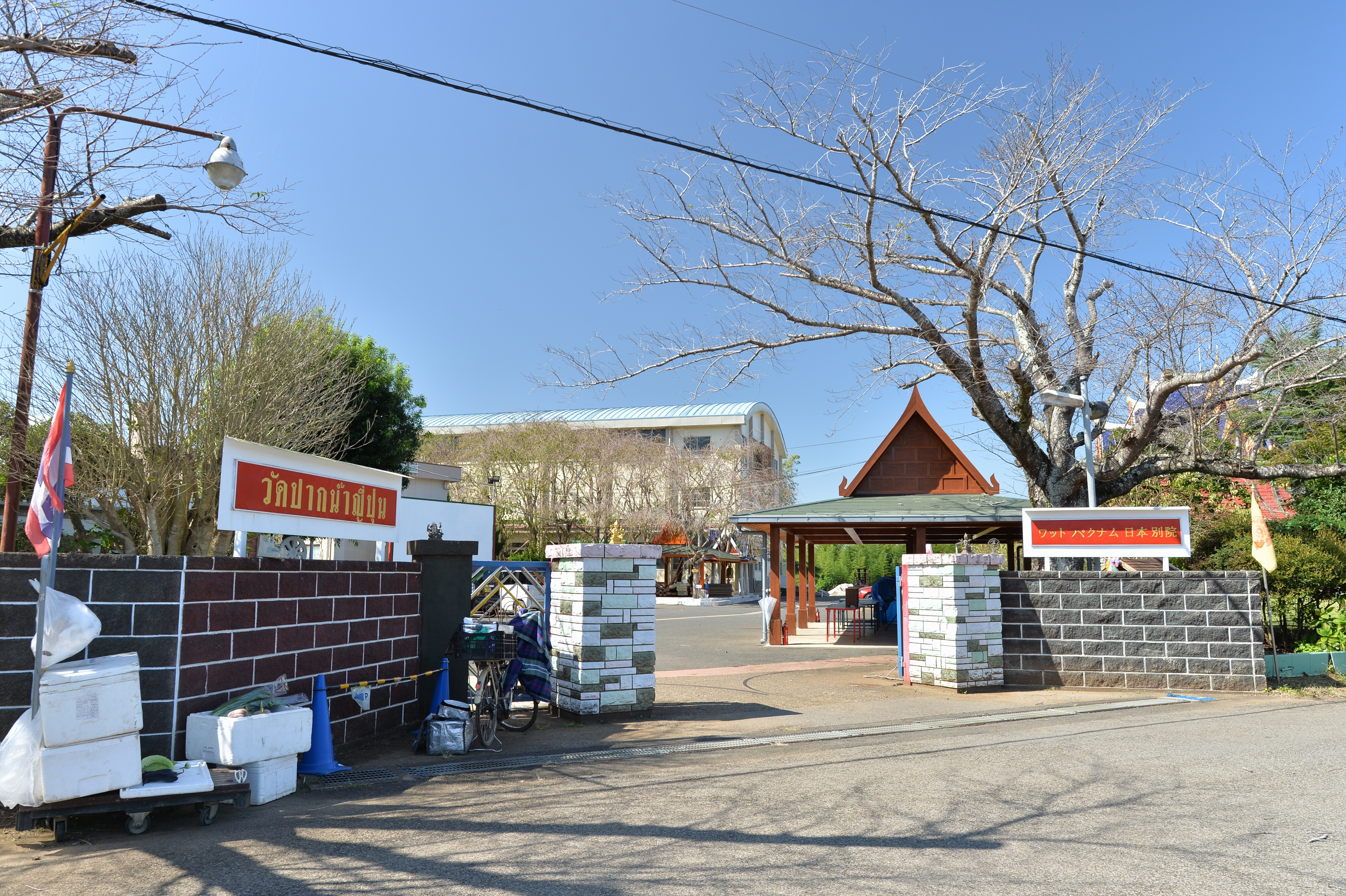
Wat Paknam Japan in Narita, Chiba, Japan.

Overseas branches associated with Wat Paknam Bhasicharoen
Region	Country	Branch	Location	Notes	Ref.
Asia	India	Wat Paknam India	Bodh Gaya		
Asia	Japan	Wat Paknam Japan	Narita, Chiba Prefecture	Described as the first Thai temple in Japan; land purchased in 1996.	
Europe	Norway	Wat Paknam Europe	Torvastad, Rogaland		
North America	United States	Wat Somdej Phramaharatchamangalacharn	Bakersfield, California		
North America	United States	Wat Mongkoltepmunee	Bensalem, Pennsylvania	Registered as in 1983; opened in Bensalem in 1986.	
North America	United States	Wat Paknam America	Huber Heights, Ohio	Founded in 2004 as Wat Buddhamongkol Bhavana; renamed Wat Paknam America in 2007.	
North America	United States	Wat Paknam Michigan	Sterling Heights, Michigan	Reported as a newly built Wat Paknam branch in 2010.	
Oceania	New Zealand	Wat Paknam New Zealand	Tauranga	Land purchased in 2001; first resident monks arrived in January 2002.	

== Wat Phra Dhammakaya branches ==
Wat Phra Dhammakaya and the Dhammakaya Foundation list overseas meditation centres and coordination centres in Africa, Asia, Europe, North America and Oceania. Some centres are also listed in national Thai Buddhist missionary directories, such as the Council of Thai Bhikkhus in the U.S.A. directory and the Thai Sangha missionary coordination records of Mahachulalongkornrajavidyalaya University.

=== Africa and the Middle East ===
Africa and Middle East branches associated with Wat Phra Dhammakaya
Country	Branch	Location	Notes	Ref.
Bahrain	Bahrain Meditation Center	Bahrain		
Oman	Oman Meditation Center	Oman		
South Africa	The Johannesburg Meditation Center	Johannesburg	Supported by the Royal Thai Embassy in Pretoria in 2014.	
South Africa	Cape Town Meditation Centre	Cape Town	Non-profit meditation organisation in Cape Town.	
United Arab Emirates	Dubai Meditation Centre	Dubai		

=== Asia ===
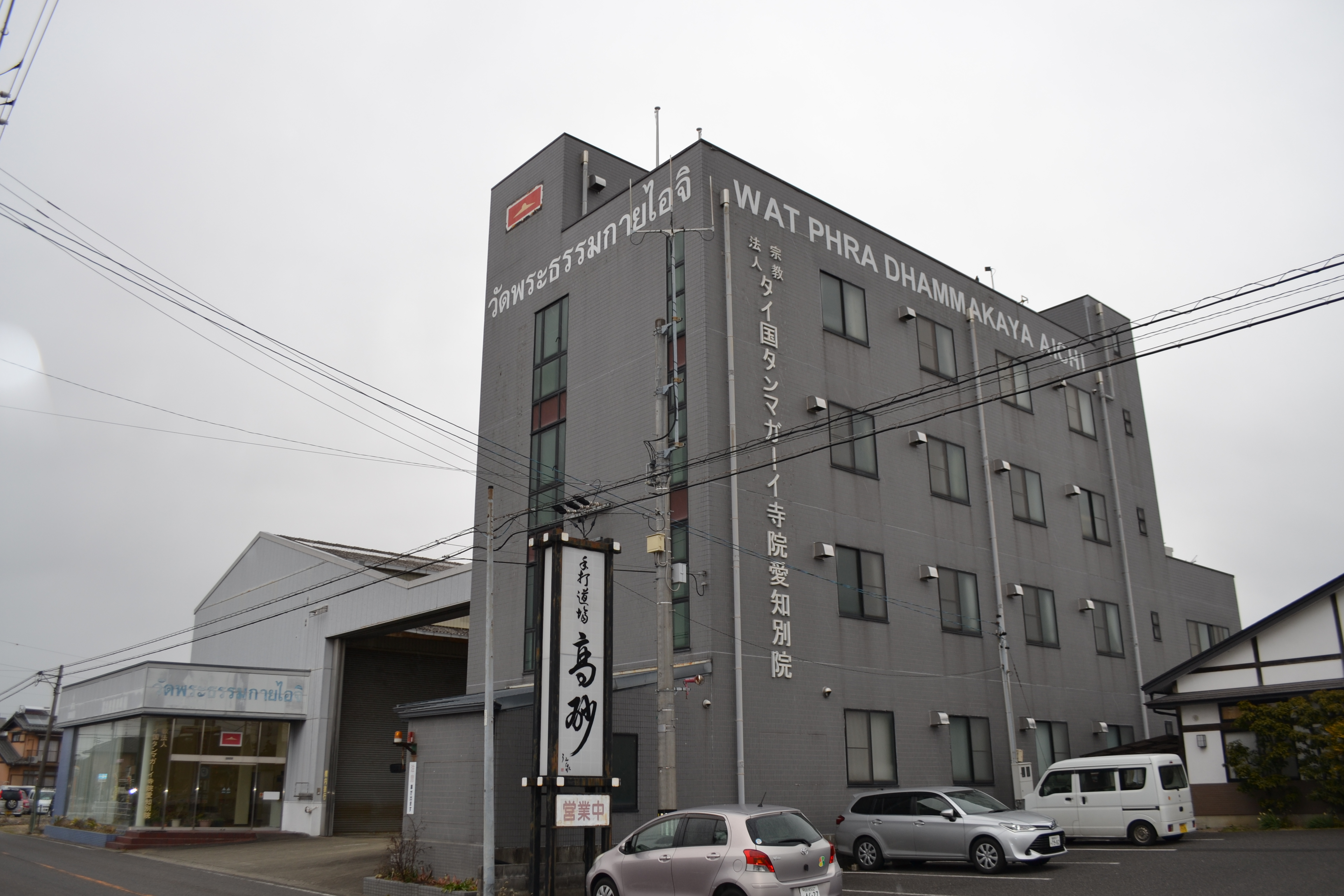
Wat Phra Dhammakaya Aichi in Konan, Aichi, Japan.

Asian branches associated with Wat Phra Dhammakaya
Country or territory	Branch	Location	Notes	Ref.
Brunei	Brunei Meditation Center	Kampong Lambak, Brunei–Muara	Also known in Thai as Wat Bhavana Brunei.	
Cambodia	Angkor Wat Moral Training Center	Siem Reap		
China	Beijing Meditation Center	Beijing		
China	Dhammakaya Coordination Center Shanghai China	Shanghai		
China	Kunming Dhammakaya Co-ordination Center	Kunming		
Hong Kong	Wat Phra Dhammakaya Hong Kong	Wan Chai		
Hong Kong	Wat Phra Dhammakaya Kowloon	Kwai Chung, New Territories		
India	Wat Buddha Santiwan Dhammachai	Nagpur, Maharashtra		
Indonesia	Bali Meditation Center	Gianyar Regency, Bali		
Indonesia	Dhammakaya Meditation Center of Indonesia	Tangerang, Banten		
Indonesia	Wat Buddha Jambi (MBMI Jambi)	Jambi		
Indonesia	Wat Buddha Sumatra (MBMI Tebing Tinggi)	Tebing Tinggi, North Sumatra		
Indonesia	Yogyakarta Meditation Center	Yogyakarta		
Japan	Dhammakaya International Meditation Center Tochigi	Nasukarasuyama, Tochigi		
Japan	Wat Bhavana Nagano	Tōmi, Nagano		
Japan	Wat Buddha Meisou (Thai Bukkyo Meisou Center)	Arakawa, Tokyo		
Japan	Wat Phra Dhammakaya Aichi	Kōnan, Aichi		
Japan	Wat Phra Dhammakaya Gunma	Yoshioka, Gunma		
Japan	Wat Phra Dhammakaya Ibaraki	Tsukuba, Ibaraki		
Japan	Wat Phra Dhammakaya Kanagawa	Ebina, Kanagawa		
Japan	Wat Phra Dhammakaya Nagano	Ueda, Nagano		
Japan	Wat Phra Dhammakaya Osaka	Osaka		
Japan	Wat Phra Dhammakaya Saitama	Higashimatsuyama, Saitama		
Japan	Wat Phra Dhammakaya Tochigi	Utsunomiya, Tochigi		
Japan	Wat Phra Dhammakaya Tokyo	Arakawa, Tokyo		
Japan	Wat Phra Dhammakaya Yamanashi	Nirasaki, Yamanashi		
Malaysia	Dhammakaya Meditation Association of Selangor	Puchong, Selangor		
Malaysia	Dhammakaya Meditation Center of Penang	Bayan Lepas, Penang		
Mongolia	Wat Phra Dhammakaya Mongolia (Dhammakaya Meditation Center of Mongolia)	Ulaanbaatar		
Nepal	Dhammakaya Meditation Center of Nepal	Kathmandu		
Philippines	The Middle Way Meditation Institute	Iloilo City		
Singapore	Dhammakaya Centre Singapore	Punggol, Singapore		
South Korea	Dhammakaya Meditation Center of Korea	Uijeongbu, Gyeonggi Province	Also known as Wat Bhavana Seoul.	
South Korea	Wat Bhavana Gyeongju	Gyeongju, North Gyeongsang Province		
South Korea	Wat Bhavana Yangju	Yangju, Gyeonggi Province		
South Korea	Wat Buddha South Gwangju (Gwangju Thai Meditation Center)	Gwangju		
Taiwan	Dhammakaya International Meditation Center of Gaoxiong [sic] / Wat Bhavana Kaohsiung	Kaohsiung		
Taiwan	Wat Bhavana Taizhong [sic]	Taichung		
Taiwan	Wat Phra Dhammakaya Taipei	New Taipei City		
Taiwan	Wat Phra Dhammakaya Taoyuan	Taoyuan		

=== Europe ===
European branches associated with Wat Phra Dhammakaya
Country	Branch	Location	Notes	Ref.
Austria	Wat Buddha Vienna	Vienna		
Austria	Wat Phra Dhammakaya Austria	Linz		
Belgium	Wat Phra Dhammakaya Belgium	Lede	Also known as Bron van Stilte.	
Denmark	Wat Phra Dhammakaya Denmark	Juelsminde		
Denmark	Wat Phra Dhammakaya Sjælland	Korsør		
France	Wat Bouddha Toulouse	Toulouse		
France	Wat Phra Dhammakaya Bordeaux	Saint-Vincent-de-Paul, Gironde		
France	Wat Phra Dhammakaya Paris	Torcy, Seine-et-Marne		
Germany	Wat Buddha Heilbronn	Obersulm, Baden-Württemberg		
Germany	Wat Buddha Nordrhein-Westfalen	Moers, North Rhine-Westphalia		
Germany	Wat Phra Dhammakaya Bavaria	Königsbrunn, Bavaria	Covered by local German press.	
Germany	Wat Phra Dhammakaya Berlin	Blankenfelde-Mahlow, Brandenburg		
Germany	Wat Phra Dhammakaya Frankfurt	Frankfurt Rhine-Main		
Germany	Wat Phra Dhammakaya Humburg	Gerdau, Lower Saxony		
Germany	Wat Phra Dhammakaya Rheinland	Ingelheim am Rhein		
Germany	Wat Phra Dhammakaya Schwarzwald	Kippenheim, Baden-Württemberg	Visited by representatives of the Thai consulate in Munich.	
Iceland	Wat Buddha Iceland	Reykjanesbær		
Italy	Wat Buddha Venezia	Venice		
Italy	Wat Phra Dhammakaya Italy	Vaprio d'Agogna, Piedmont		
Malta	Wat Buddha Malta	Malta		
Netherlands	Wat Phra Dhammakaya Netherlands	Afferden, Gelderland	Began in 2014 and has been based in a former church in Afferden since 2017.	
Norway	Wat Phra Dhammakaya Eigersund	Eigersund		
Norway	Wat Phra Dhammakaya Norway	Holmestrand		
Sweden	Wat Phra Dhammakaya Borås	Borås		
Sweden	Wat Phra Dhammakaya North Sweden	Gävle		
Sweden	Wat Phra Dhammakaya Stockholm	Stora Vika, Stockholm County		
Switzerland	Wat Phra Dhammakaya Switzerland	Arni, Bern	Uses a former mountain hotel as a temple.	
United Kingdom	Wat Phra Dhammakaya London	Woking, Surrey	Part of the Dhammakaya Movement UK network.	
United Kingdom	Wat Phra Dhammakaya Manchester	Stockport, Greater Manchester		
United Kingdom	Wat Phra Dhammakaya Newcastle	Hebburn, Tyne and Wear	Subject of Thai media coverage on its contemporary temple architecture.	
United Kingdom	Wat Phra Dhammakaya Scotland	Helensburgh, Scotland	Also known as Meditation Center of Scotland.	

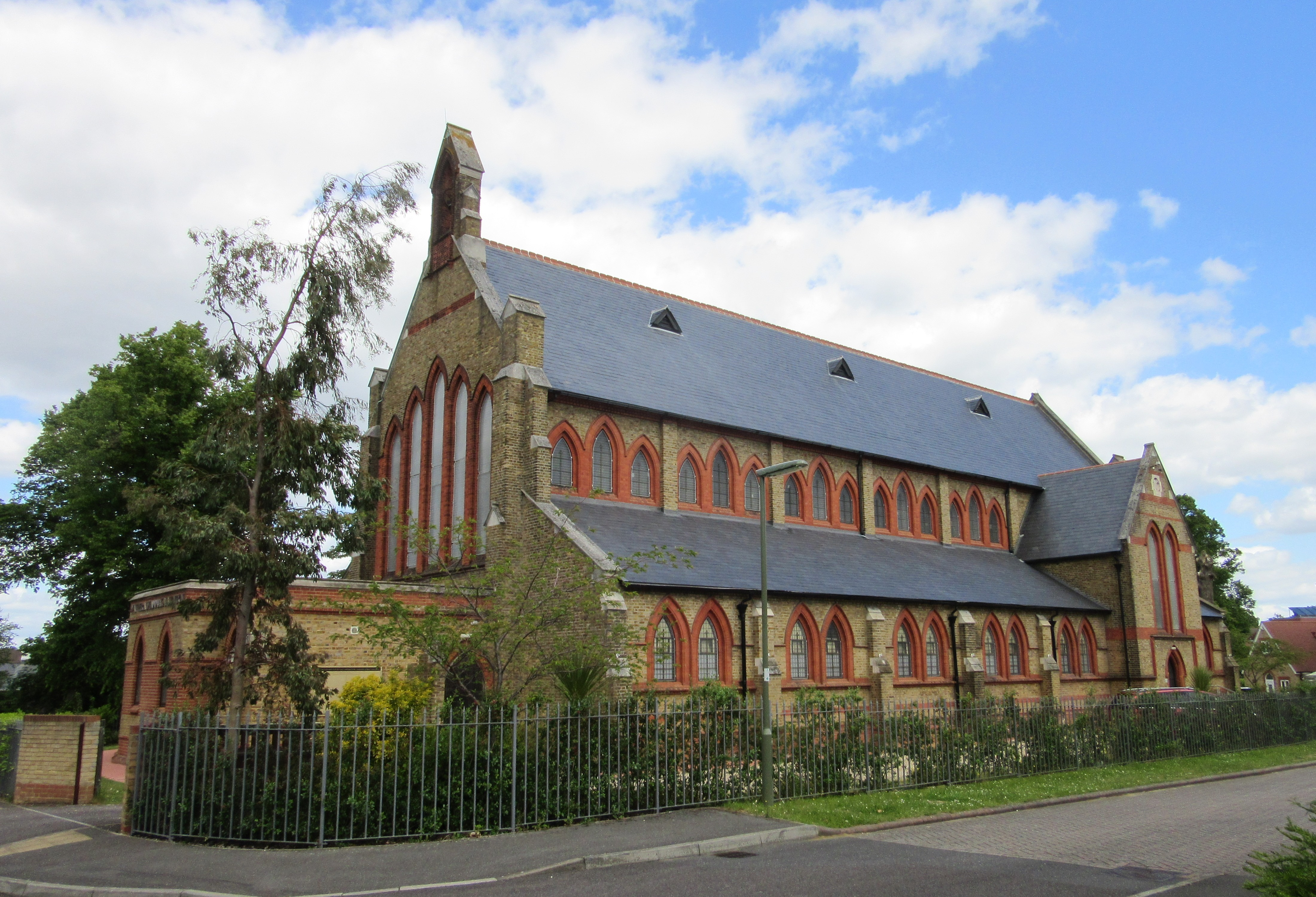
Wat Phra Dhammakaya London in Woking, United Kingdom.

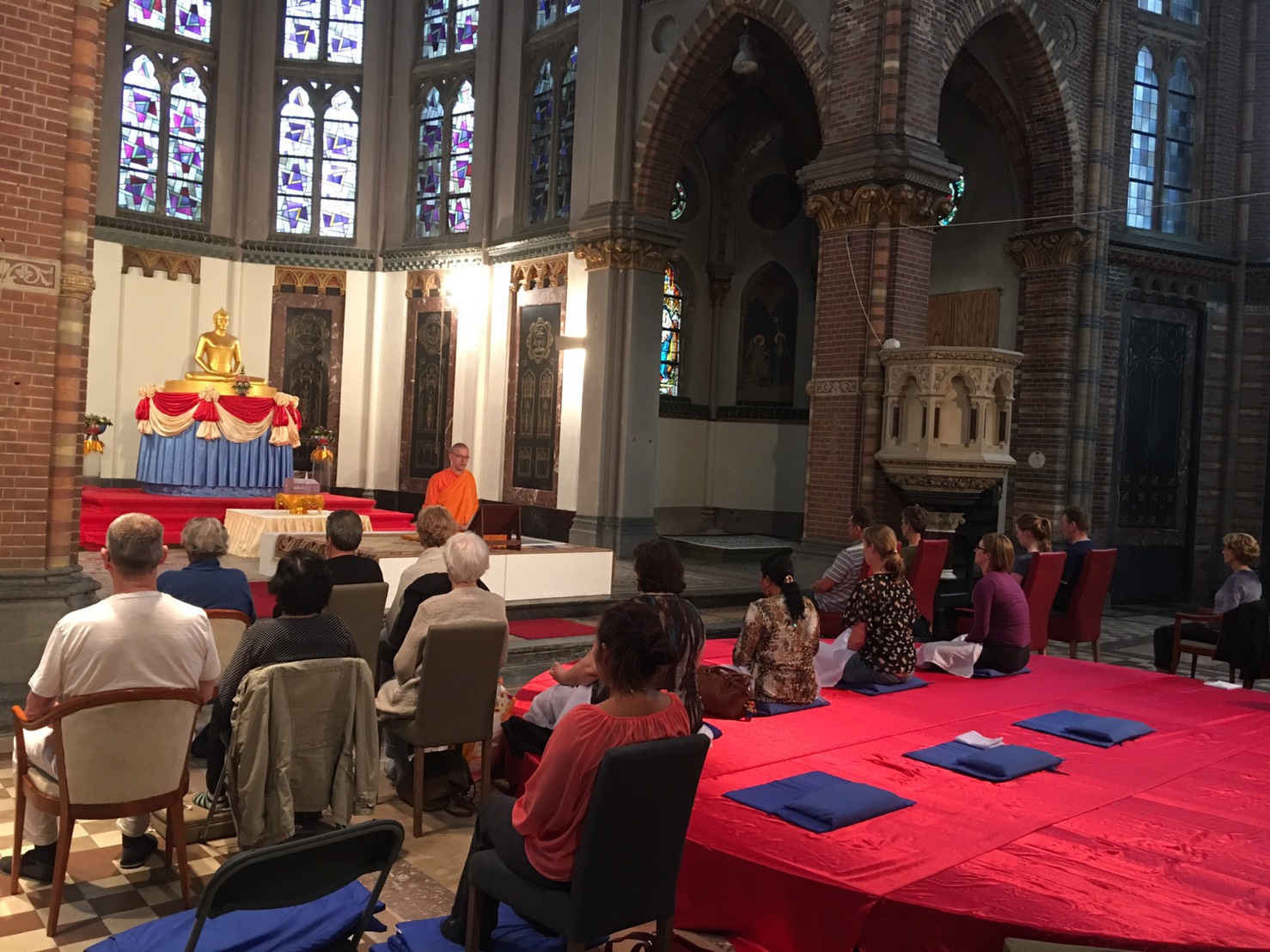
Meditation evening at Wat Phra Dhammakaya Netherlands in Afferden.

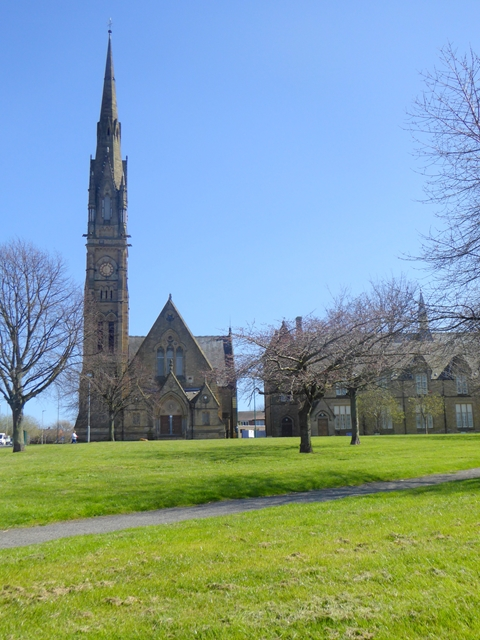
Wat Phra Dhammakaya Newcastle in Hebburn, Tyne and Wear.

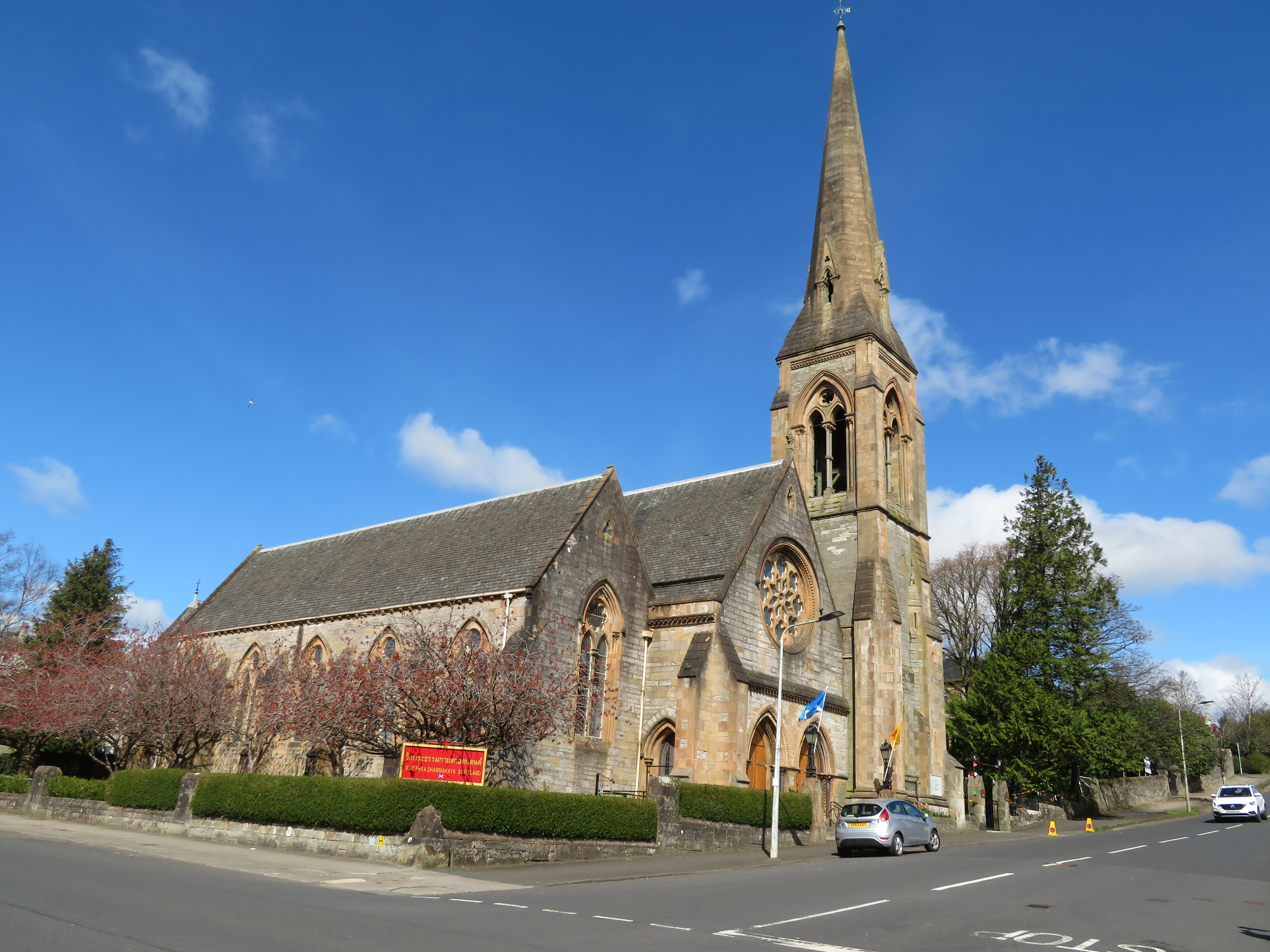
Wat Phra Dhammakaya Scotland in Helensburgh, Scotland.

=== North America ===
North American branches associated with Wat Phra Dhammakaya
Country	Branch	Location	Notes	Ref.
Canada	Centre Meditation Dhammakaya de Montreal	Montreal, Quebec		
Canada	Dhammakaya International Meditation Society of British Columbia	British Columbia	Also known as Wat Phra Dhammakaya Vancouver.	
United States	Dhammakaya International Meditation Center	Azusa, California		
United States	Dhammakaya International Meditation Center Denver	Denver, Colorado		
United States	Dhammakaya International Meditation Center Kansas	Kansas		
United States	Dhammakaya International Meditation Center of New Jersey	New Jersey		
United States	Dhammakaya Meditation Center Boston	Massachusetts		
United States	Dhammakaya Meditation Center Silicon Valley	California		
United States	Dhammakaya Meditation Center Tennessee	Tennessee		
United States	Florida Meditation Center (Wat Phra Dhammakaya Florida)	Florida		
United States	Georgia Meditation Center	Atlanta, Georgia		
United States	Meditation Center of Chicago	Chicago, Illinois		
United States	Meditation Center of D.C.	Washington metropolitan area		
United States	Meditation Center of Texas	Arlington, Texas		
United States	Minnesota Meditation Center	Minnesota		
United States	Oregon Meditation Center	Portland, Oregon		
United States	Palm Beach Meditation Center	Palm Beach County, Florida		
United States	Seattle Meditation Center	Washington		

=== Oceania ===
Oceanian branches associated with Wat Phra Dhammakaya
Country	Branch	Location	Notes	Ref.
Australia	Wat Phra Dhammakaya Albury	East Albury, New South Wales	Activities began in 2010; officially permitted to open as a temple in 2014.	
Australia	Wat Buddha Adelaide	Prospect, South Australia	Founded in 2025.	
Australia	Wat Phra Dhammakaya Brisbane	Kalinga, Queensland	Acquired a house for use as a temple in 2006.	
Australia	Wat Phra Dhammakaya Melbourne	Camberwell, Victoria	Also known as Dhammakaya Multicultural Meditation Centre Melbourne.	
Australia	Wat Phra Dhammakaya Sydney	Berrilee, New South Wales	Registered in 1997; permanent site opened in 2004.	
Australia	Wat Phra Dhammakaya Western Australia	Mandurah, Western Australia	Permanent centre established in 2004; Mandurah property purchased in 2009.	
New Zealand	Wat Phra Dhammakaya Auckland	Auckland	Permanent centre established in Orewa in 2004; later moved to Auckland.	
New Zealand	Wat Phra Dhammakaya Dunedin	Dunedin	Opened in 2006; permanent meditation centre opened in 2007.	
New Zealand	Wat Phra Dhammakaya Wellington	Tawa, Wellington	Formally established in 2011; became a branch meditation centre in 2012.	
Solomon Islands	Wat Phra Dhammakaya Solomon	Honiara	Registered as a non-profit charitable organisation in 2009.	

== Wat Luang Phor Sodh Dhammakayaram branches ==
Wat Luang Phor Sodh Dhammakayaram is a Thai Buddhist temple in Ratchaburi province, Thailand, associated with the Dhammakaya meditation tradition.

Overseas branches associated with Wat Luang Phor Sodh Dhammakayaram
Region	Country	Branch	Location	Notes	Ref.
Europe	Norway	Wat Luang Phor Sodh Norway	Tananger, Rogaland		

== See also ==
- Dhammakaya tradition
- Dhammakaya Movement UK
- Dhammakaya meditation
- International Thai Buddhist monasteries
- Buddhism in Thailand
