= Hemfosa railway station =

Railway station in Haninge, Sweden

Hemfosa
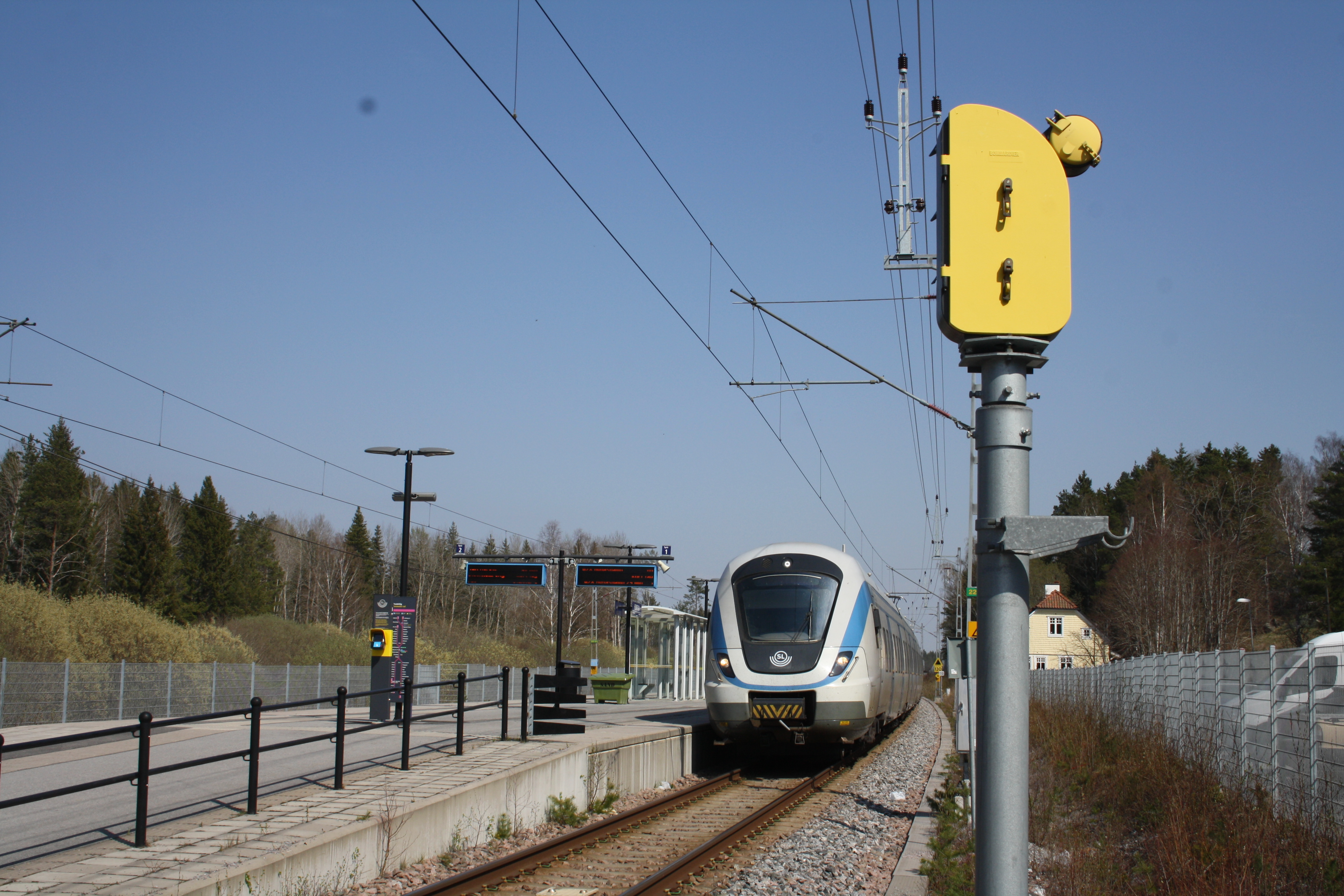
- Hemfosa station in 2019

General information
- Location: Stockholm County
- Coordinates: 59°4′7″N 17°58′35″E
- System: Pendeltåg
- Owner: Swedish Transport Administration
- Platforms: 1 Island Platform
- Tracks: 1

Construction
- Structure type: At-grade

Other information
- Station code: Hfa

History
- Opened: 1901

Passengers
- 2021: 150 boardings per weekday (2021) (commuter rail)

Services
Preceding station	Stockholm commuter rail	Following station
Tungelsta towards Bålsta	43	Segersäng towards Nynäshamn
Location

Hemfosa is a station on Stockholm's commuter rail network, located in Haninge Municipality on the Nynäs Line. It is the least-used station in the entire commuter rail system, with approximately 150 boardings per weekday as of 2021. During the 1990s, the station was under threat of closure due to low passenger numbers.

== History ==
The station was originally opened in 1901. The station building was converted into a residential house in 1963 and was later designated as a heritage-listed (q-märkt) building. However, the building suffered an interior fire on the night of March 17, 2023, with the cause remaining unclear.

== Public transport connections ==
Hemfosa is, along with Krigslida, one of two stations on Stockholm's commuter rail network that lacks connections to other public transport services.

== Gallery ==
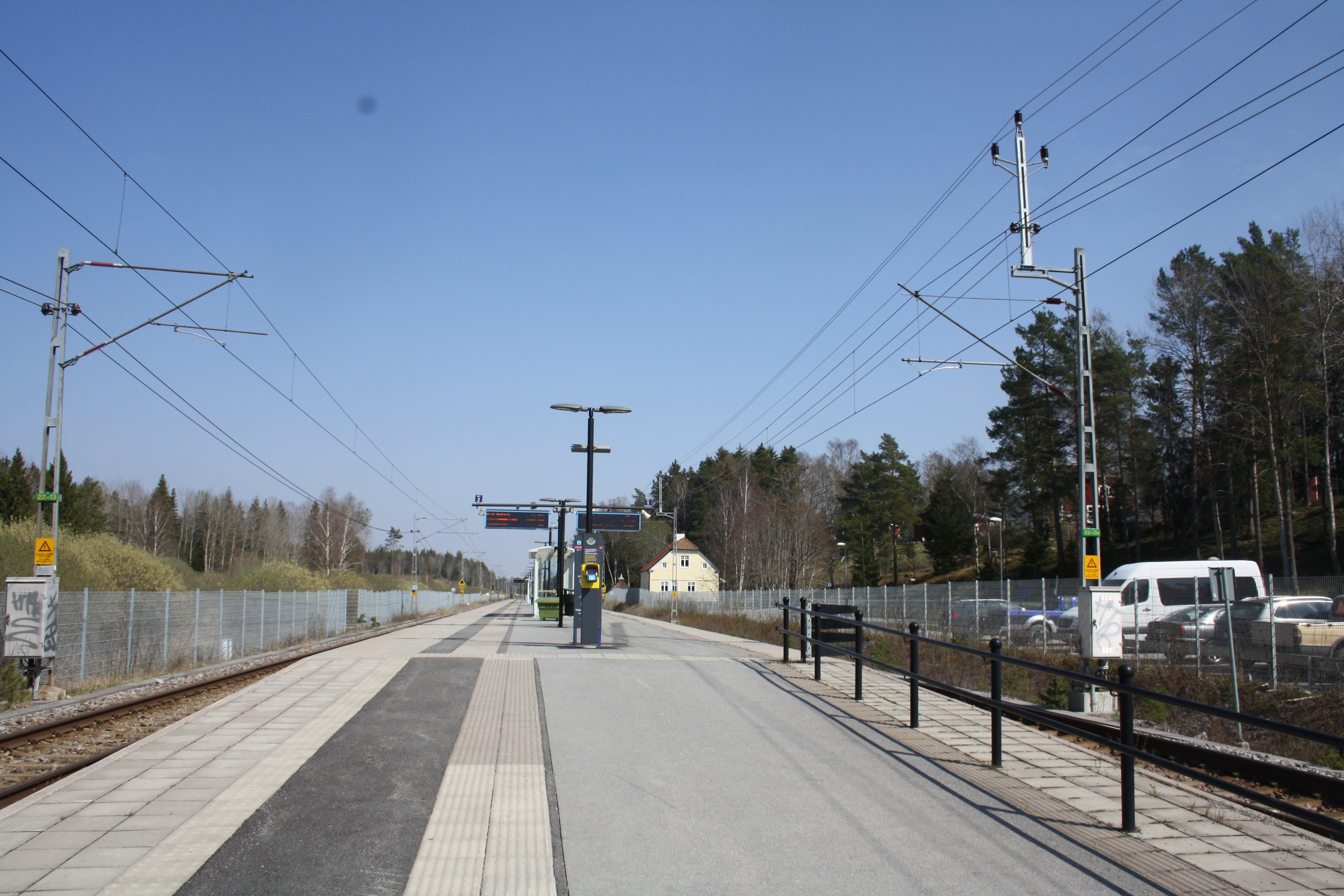
Platform

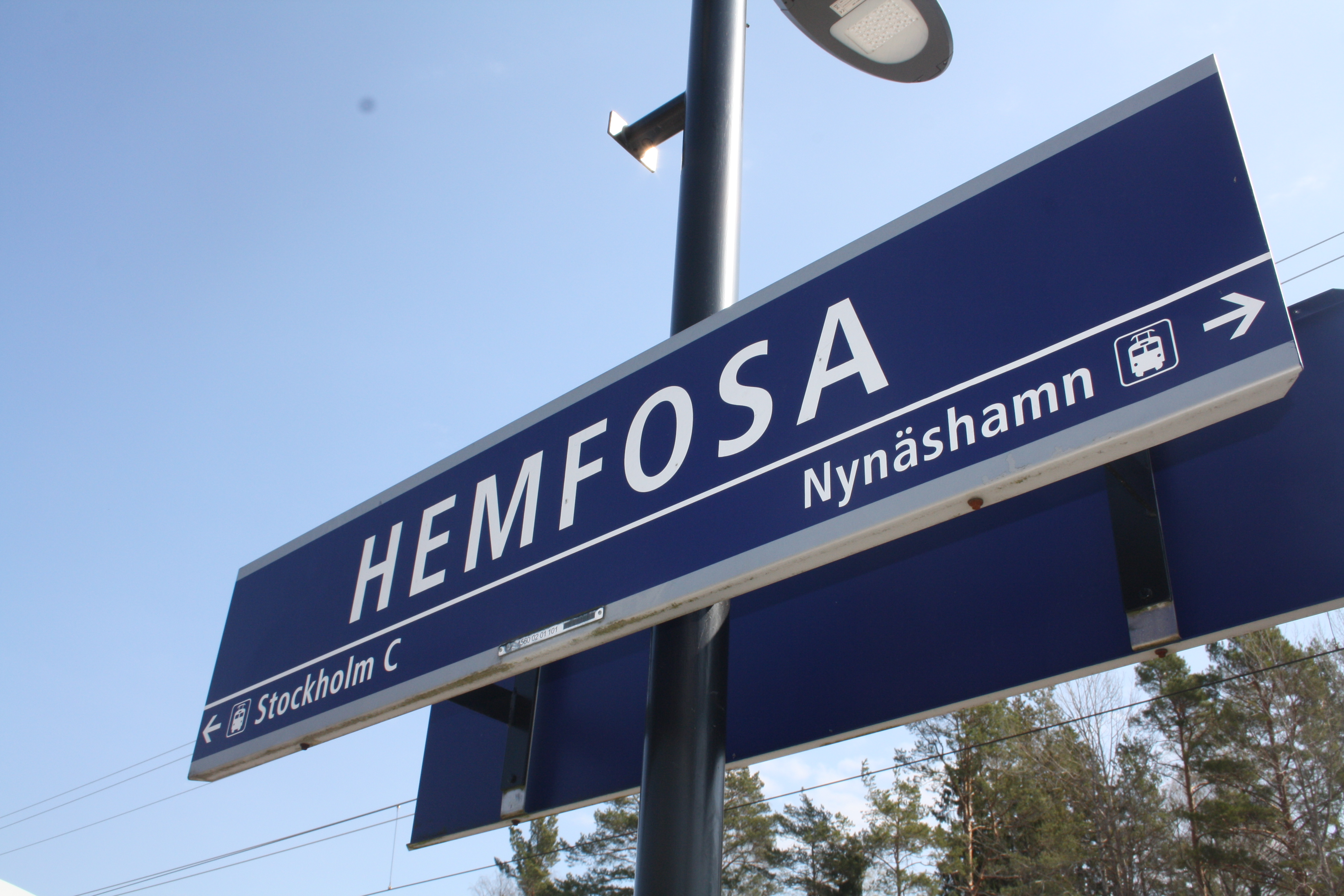
Station sign

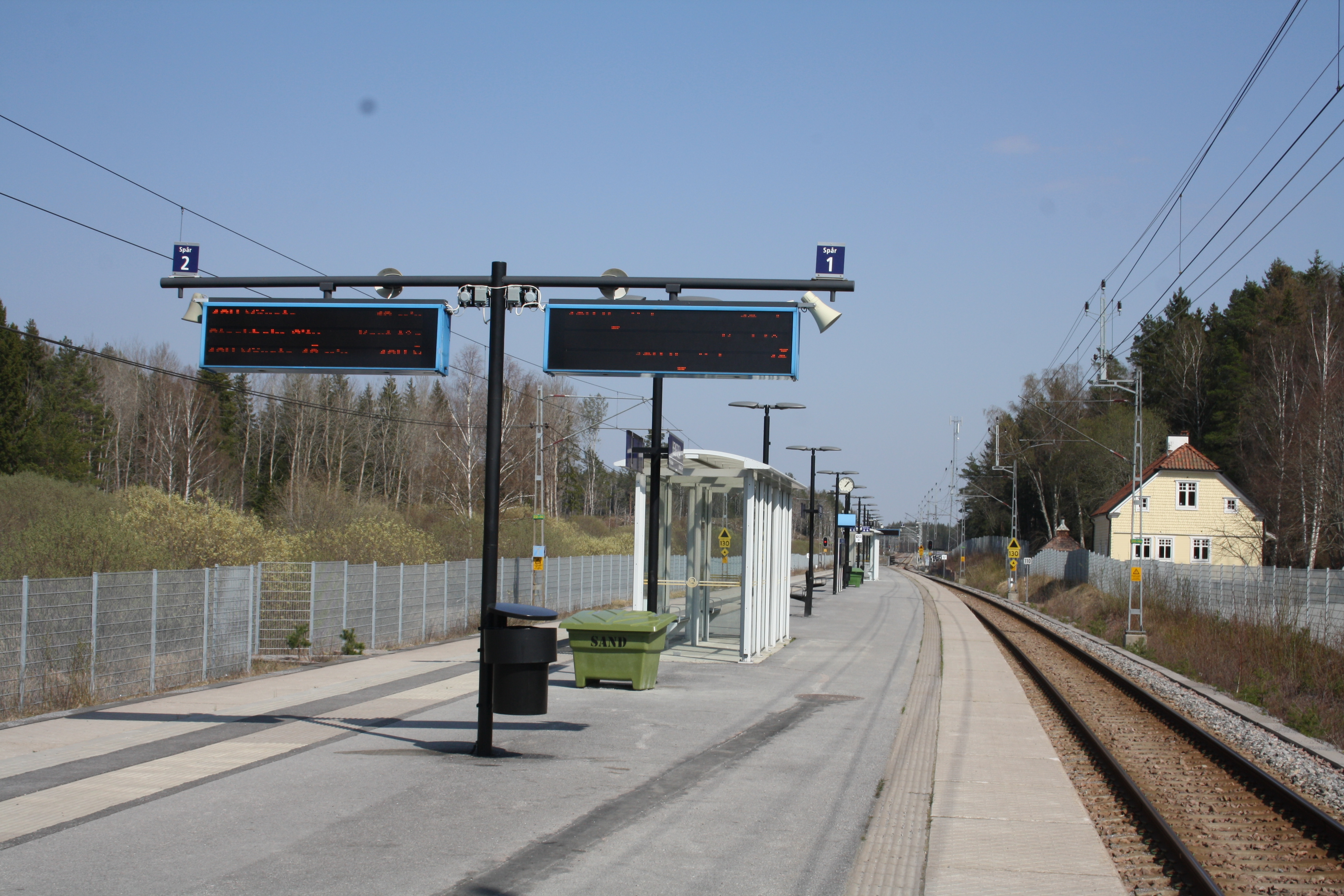
View of the platform

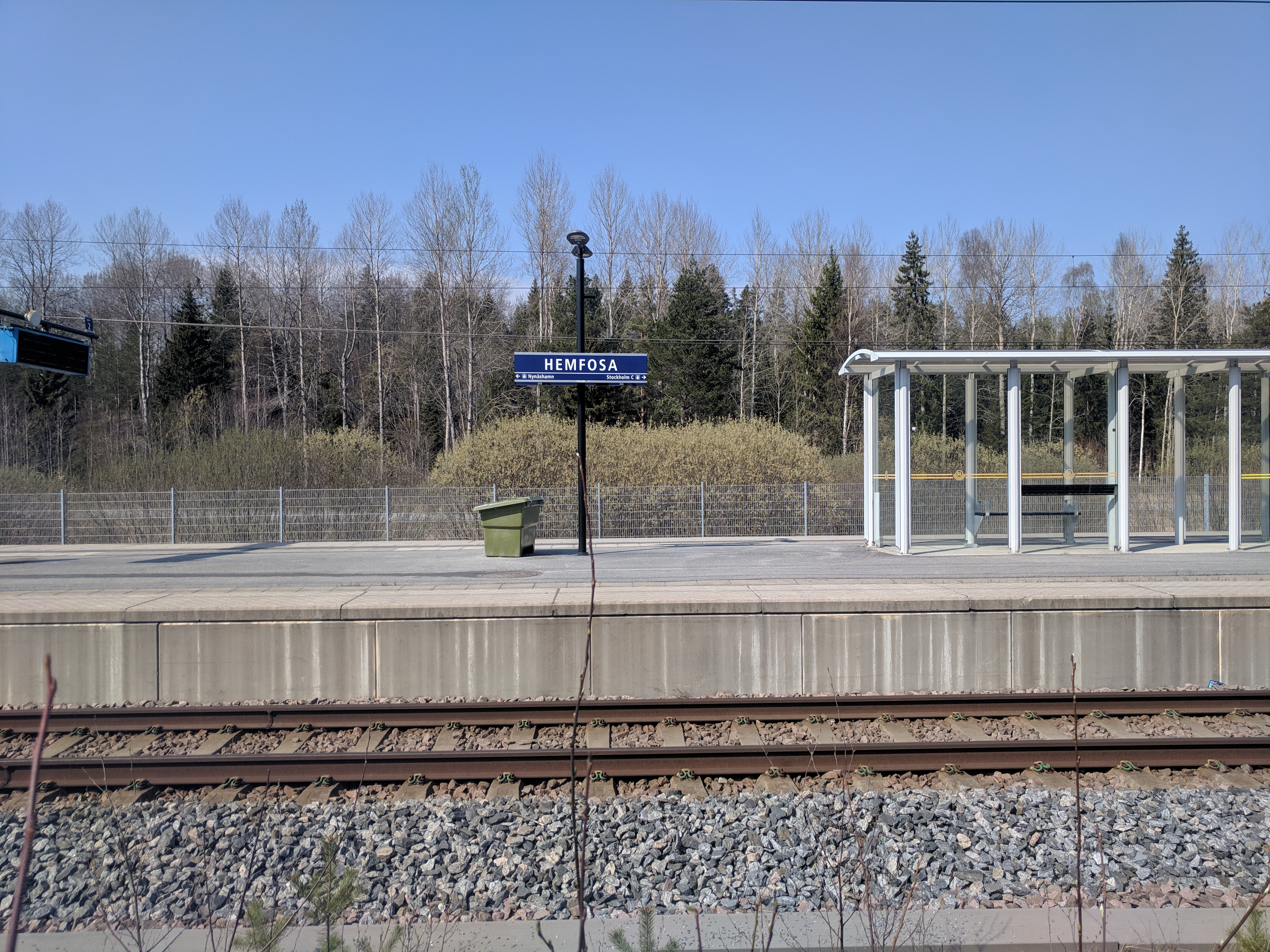
Station and sign
