= Krigslida railway station =

Railway station in Haninge, Sweden

Krigslida
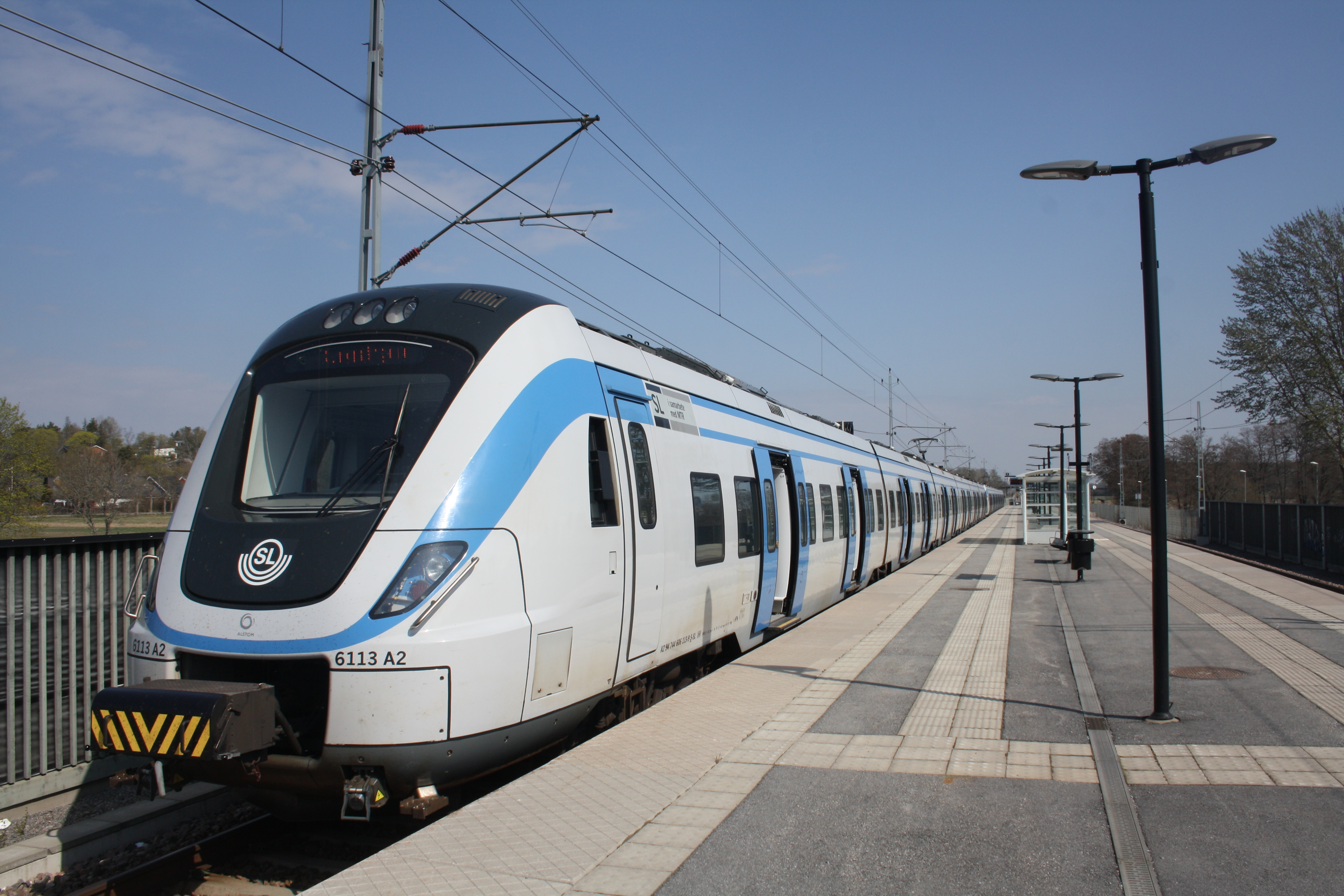
- Krigslida station in 2019

General information
- Location: Stockholm County
- Coordinates: 59°6′32″N 18°3′55″E
- System: Pendeltåg
- Owner: Swedish Transport Administration
- Platforms: 1 island platform
- Tracks: 2

Construction
- Structure type: At-grade

Other information
- Station code: Kda

History
- Opened: 1980
- Rebuilt: 2012 (double track upgrade)

Services
Preceding station	Stockholm commuter rail	Following station
Västerhaninge towards Bålsta	43	Tungelsta towards Nynäshamn
Location

Krigslida is a station on Stockholm's commuter rail network, located in the locality of Tungelsta within Haninge Municipality. It is situated on the Nynäs Line, 33.5 km from Stockholm City. The station was opened in the summer of 1980 as a single-track stop, replacing the former Nedersta station approximately 600 meters to the north. On December 3, 2012, the double-track upgrade between Västerhaninge and Tungelsta was completed, after which Krigslida received a central island platform.

Krigslida, together with Hemfosa, is one of only two stations on the Stockholm commuter rail network that lack connections to other public transport services.

== Gallery ==
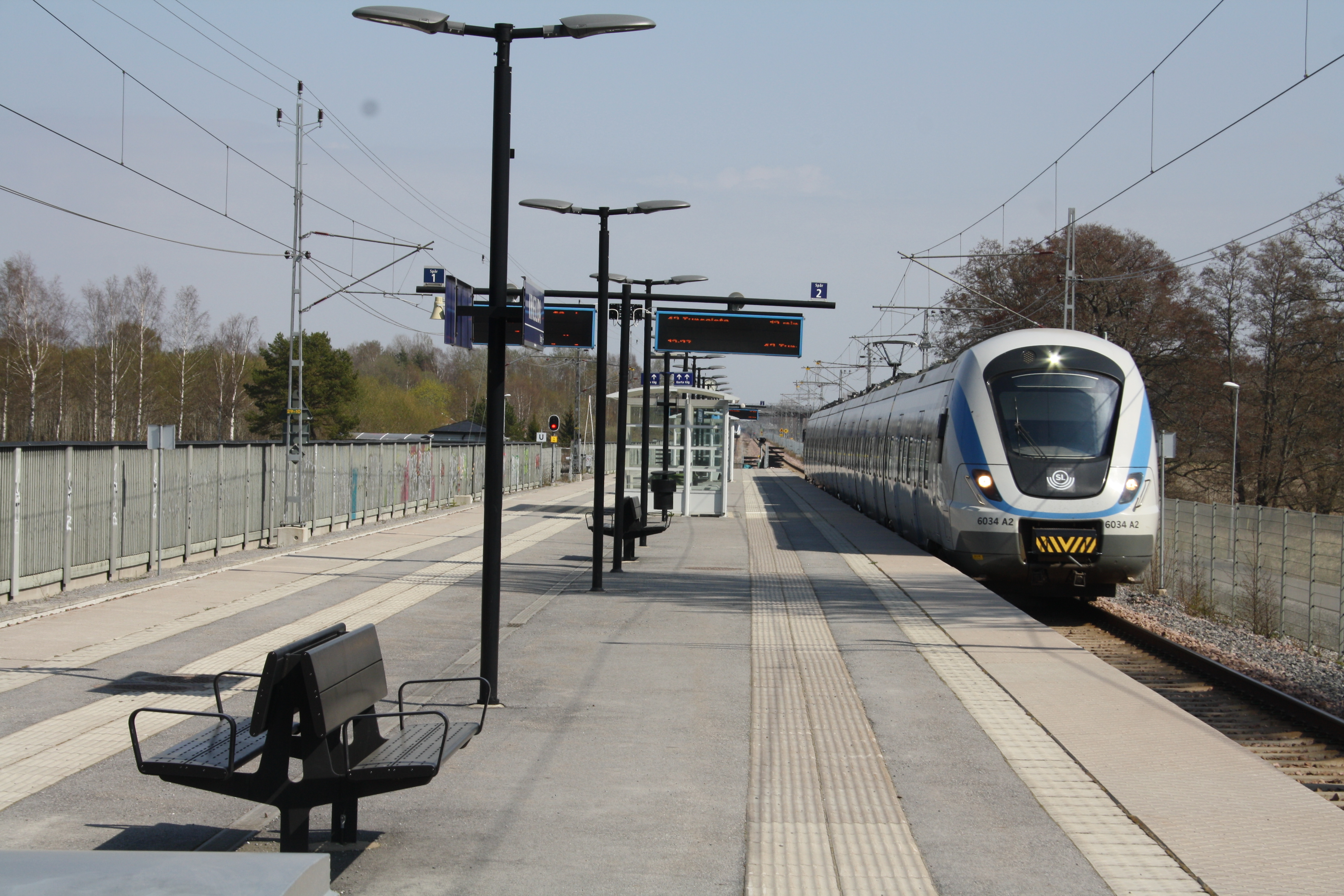
Platform

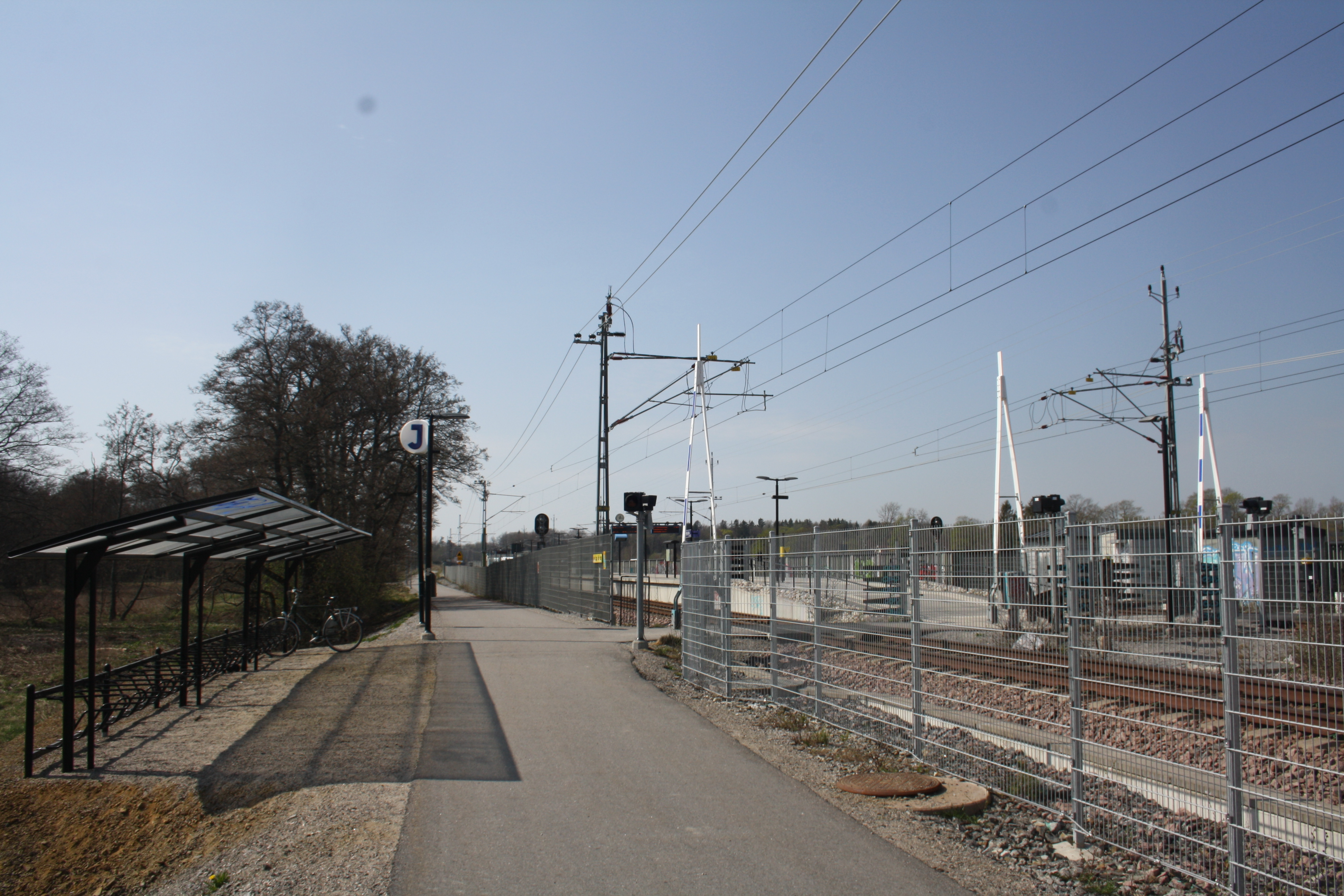
Entrance

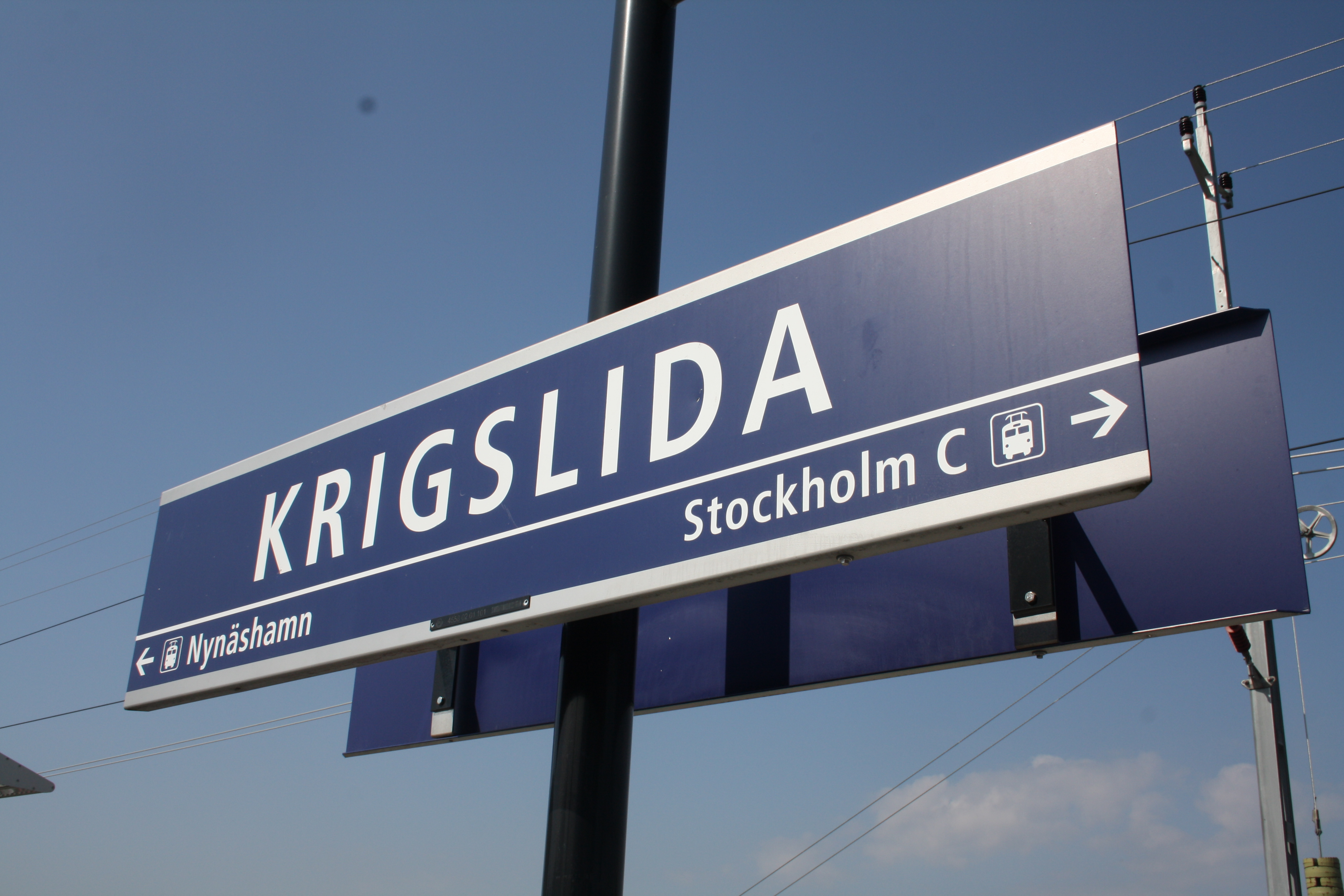
Station sign

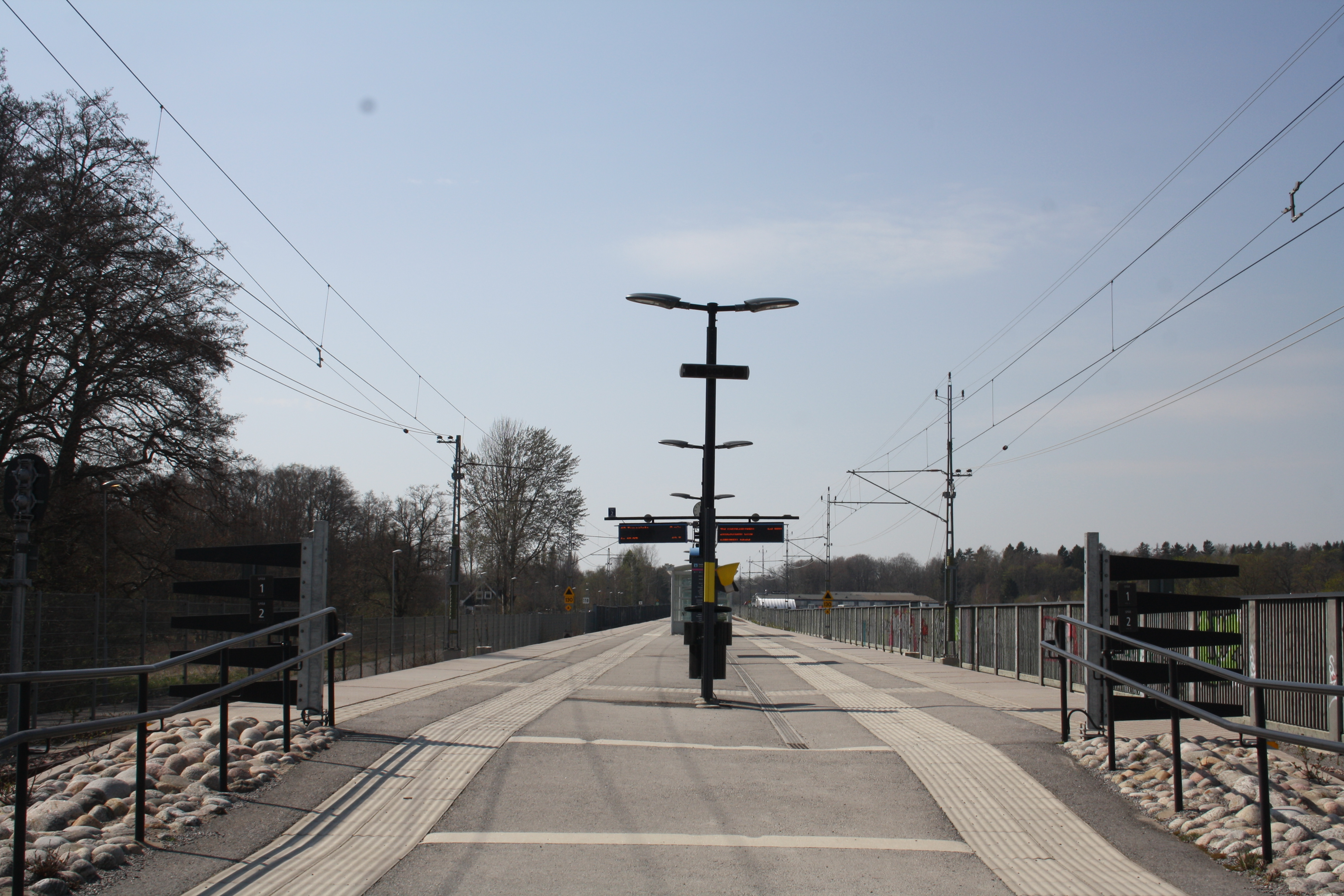
Platform view
