= Västerhaninge railway station =

Railway station in Haninge, Sweden

Västerhaninge
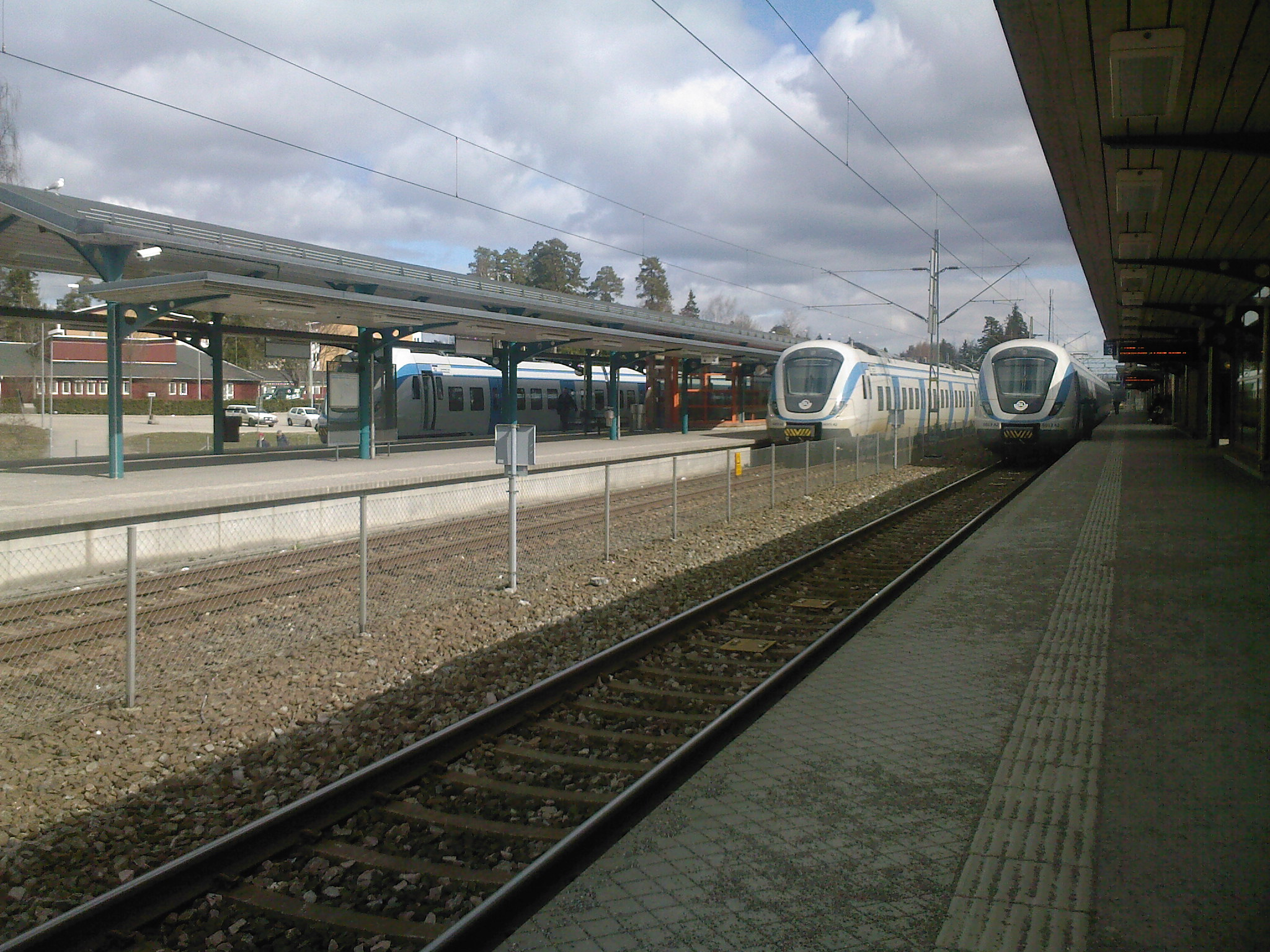
- Västerhaninge station

General information
- Location: Västerhaninge, Haninge Municipality, Stockholm County; Sweden
- Coordinates: 59°7′3″N 18°6′3″E
- System: Pendeltåg
- Owner: Swedish Transport Administration
- Platforms: 2
- Tracks: 3

Construction
- Structure type: At-grade

Other information
- Station code: Vhe

History
- Opened: 1901

Services
Preceding station	Stockholm commuter rail	Following station
Krigslida towards Bålsta	43	Jordbro towards Nynäshamn
Location

Västerhaninge is a station on the Stockholm commuter rail network, located in Västerhaninge within Haninge Municipality, 31.1 km from Stockholm Central Station.

The travel time by train to Stockholm City or Nynäshamn is approximately 30 minutes. The number of boarding passengers on a winter weekday is estimated at 4,500. The station is the terminus for some services.

== History ==
The land for the station and surrounding infrastructure was acquired in 1900, with the station area taken from the Erikslund property, while the tracks were built on land from the Västerhaninge rectory. The construction altered local roads, with Klockargatan being rerouted parallel to the railway before crossing it via a pedestrian path with a turnstile. A bridge now exists at approximately the same location.

The original station building was designed by architect Ferdinand Boberg and featured a distinctive yellow wooden facade with a "fish scale" panel design. The building was demolished in 1974. A separate railway worker's house, initially a small track watchman's hut, was expanded into the railway master's residence. The station was managed by multiple stationmasters between 1901 and 1967.

During the mid and late 1990s, the station underwent renovations, including an expanded rail yard, direct connections between buses and trains, a platform accessible via a pedestrian tunnel that also helped connectivity between western and eastern Västerhaninge, new station buildings on the side platform and at the pedestrian and bicycle tunnel, as well as heated waiting areas on the platforms.

== Buses ==
Adjacent to the station is a bus terminal with direct transfers between trains and buses. Several SL bus lines serve the terminal. There is also a park-and-ride facility and a taxi station at the station.

== Gallery ==
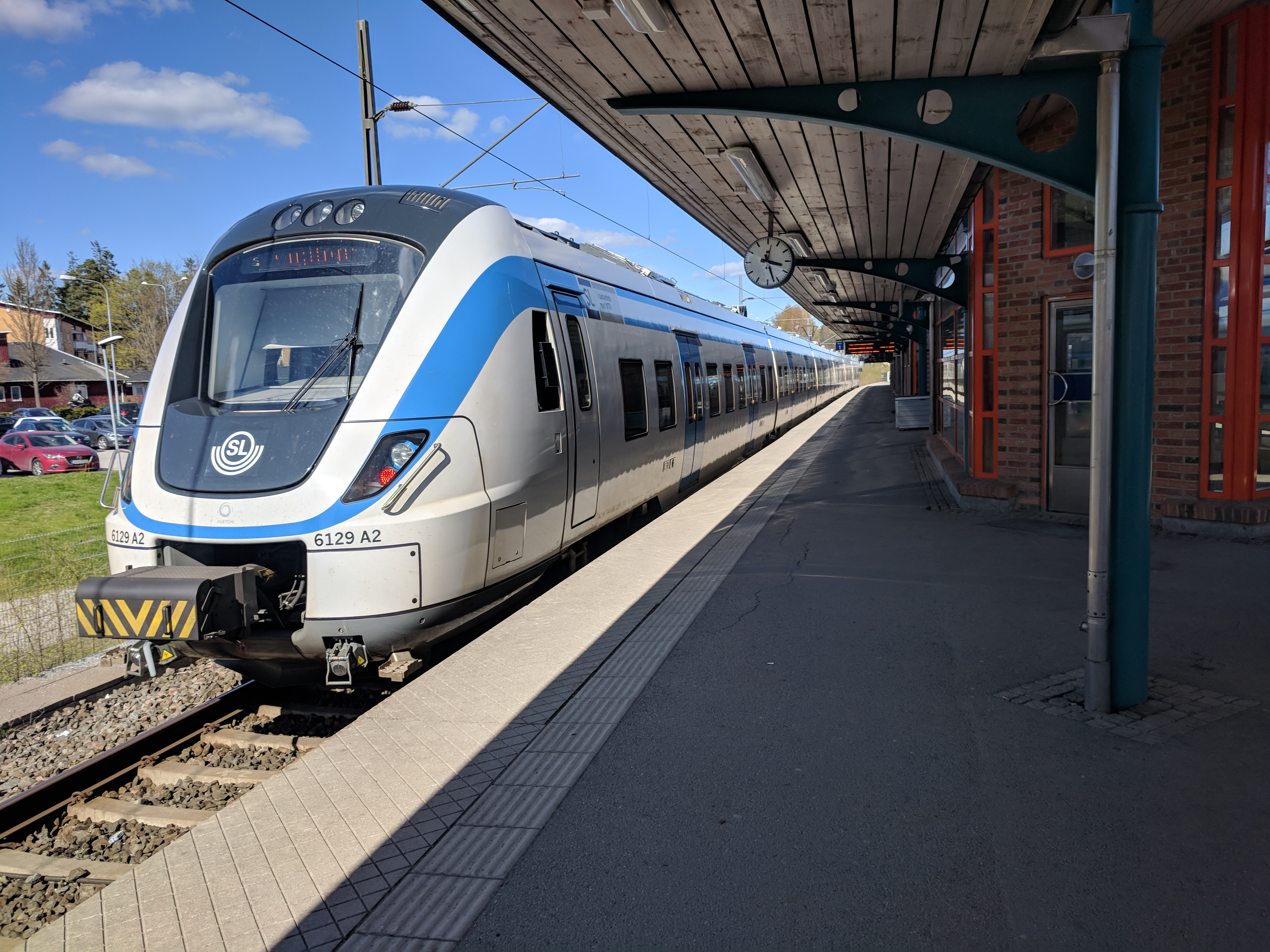
Entrance

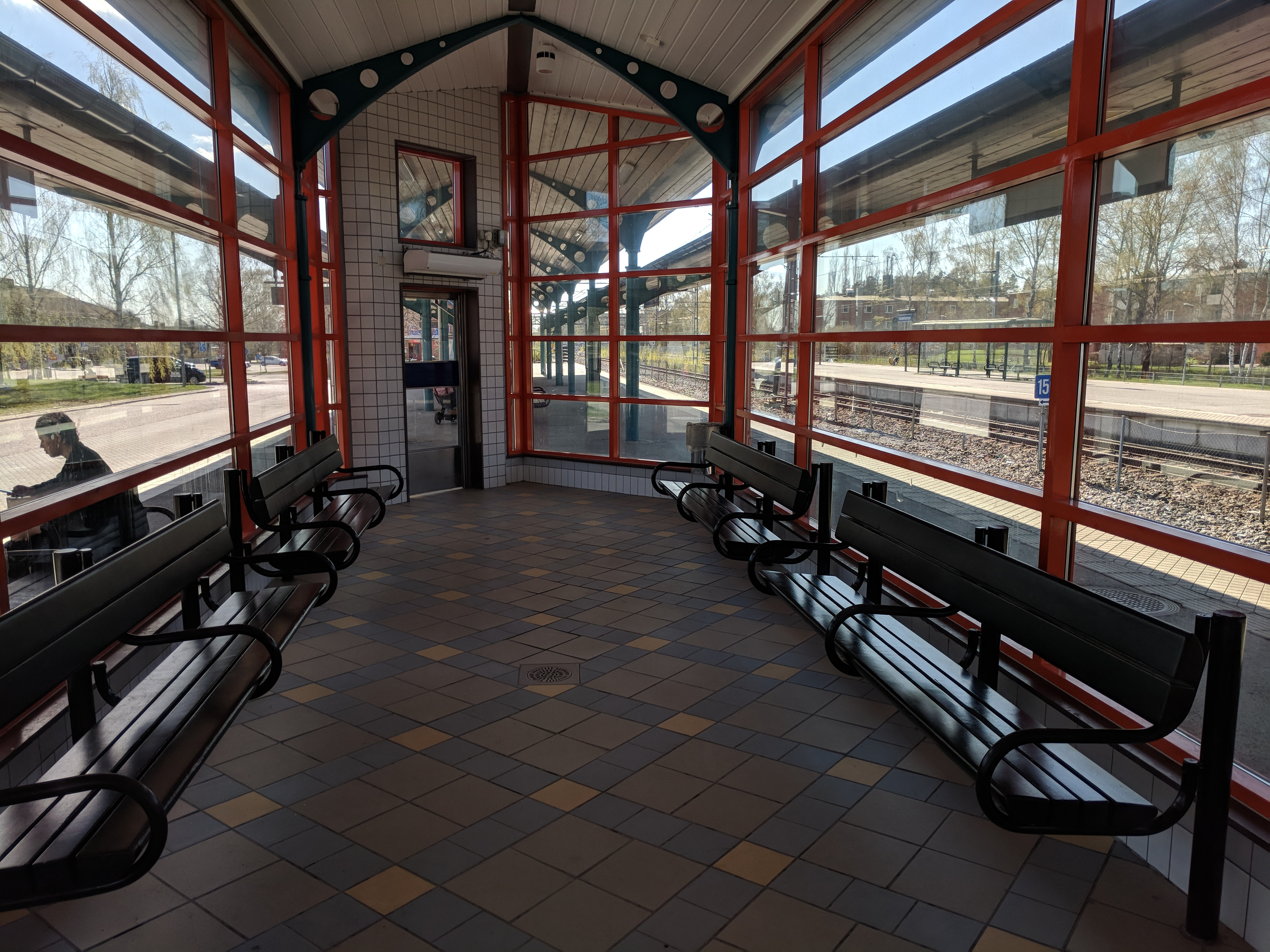
Waiting hall

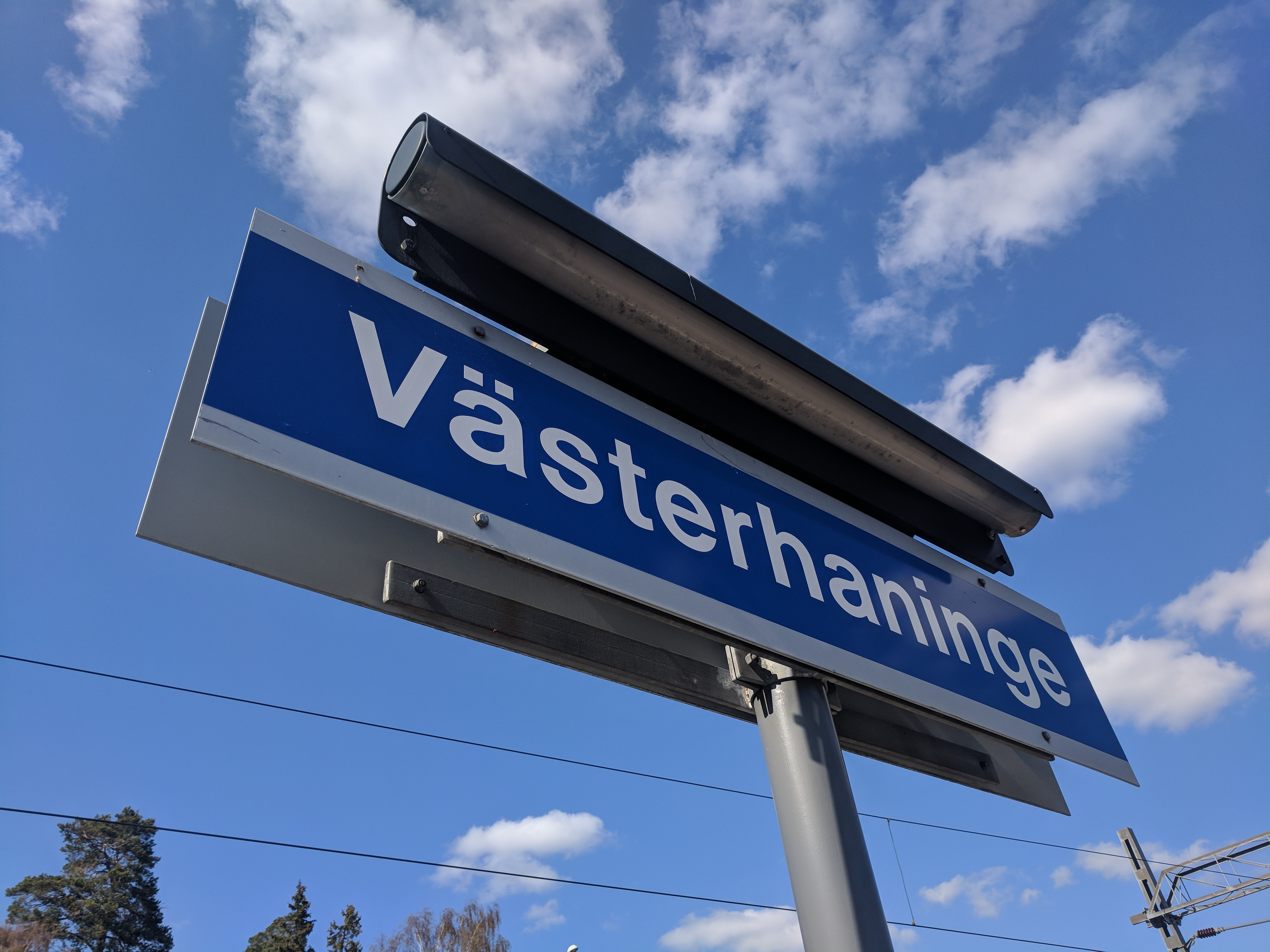
Station sign

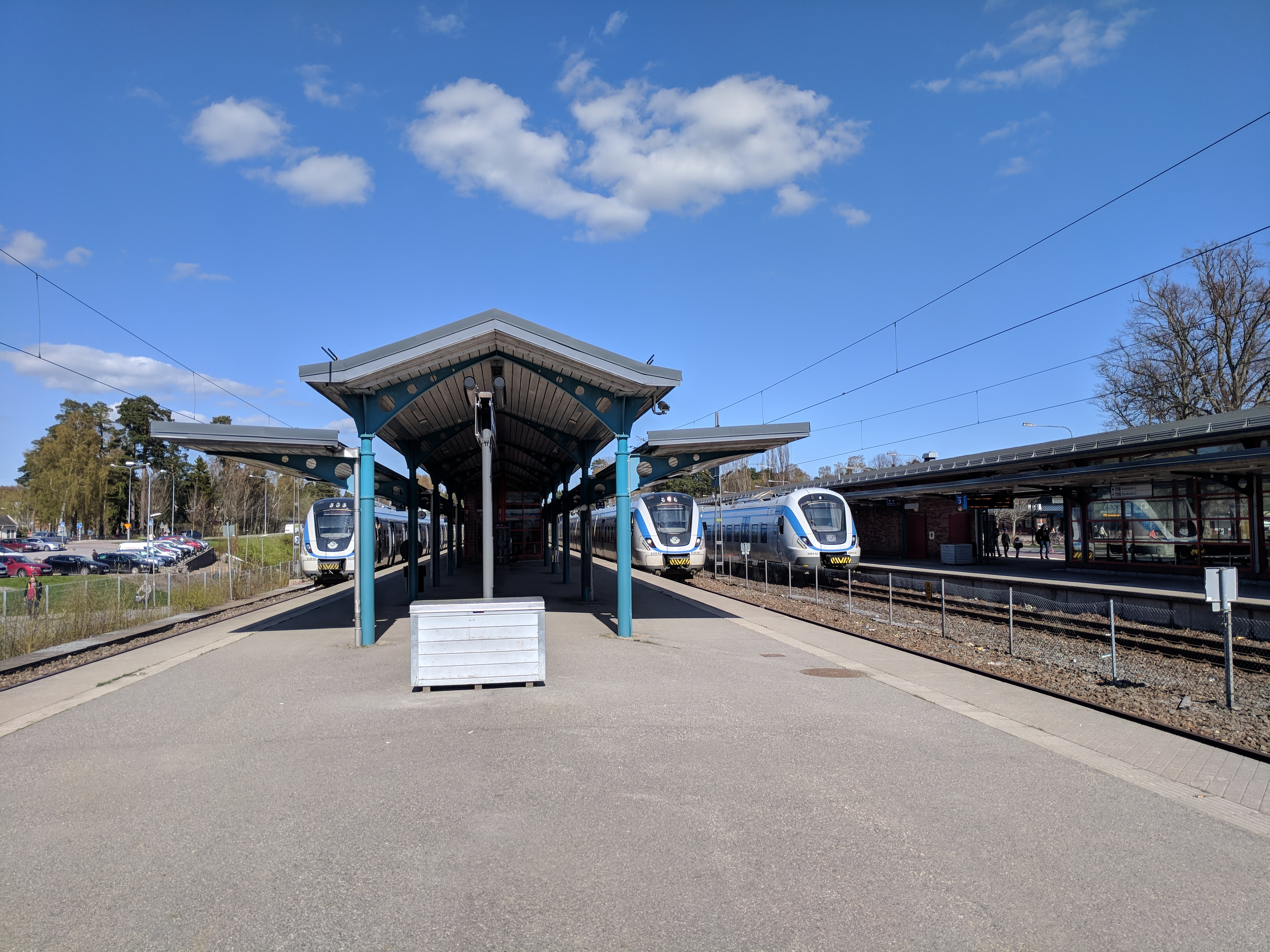
Platform

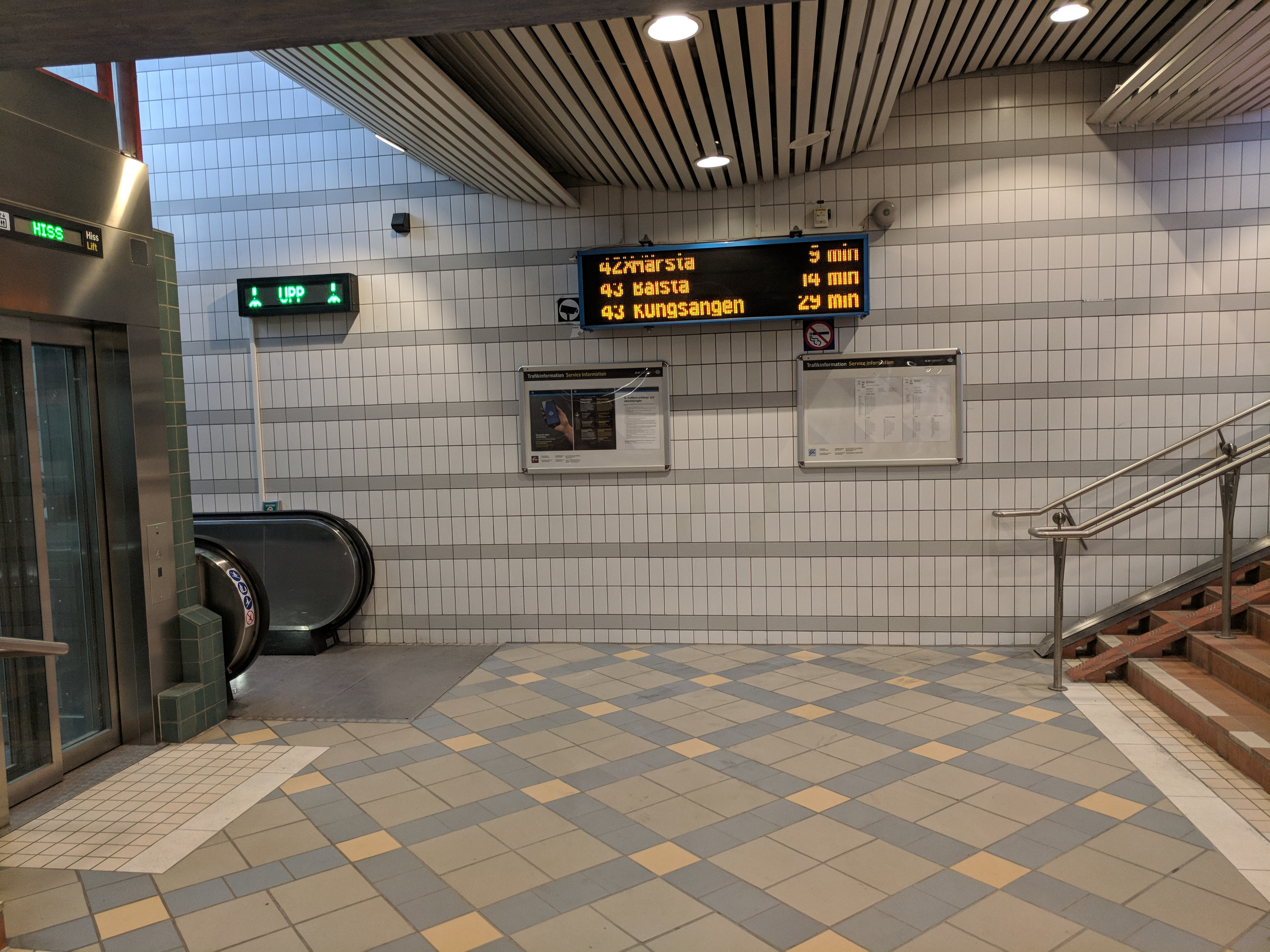
Access to the platform

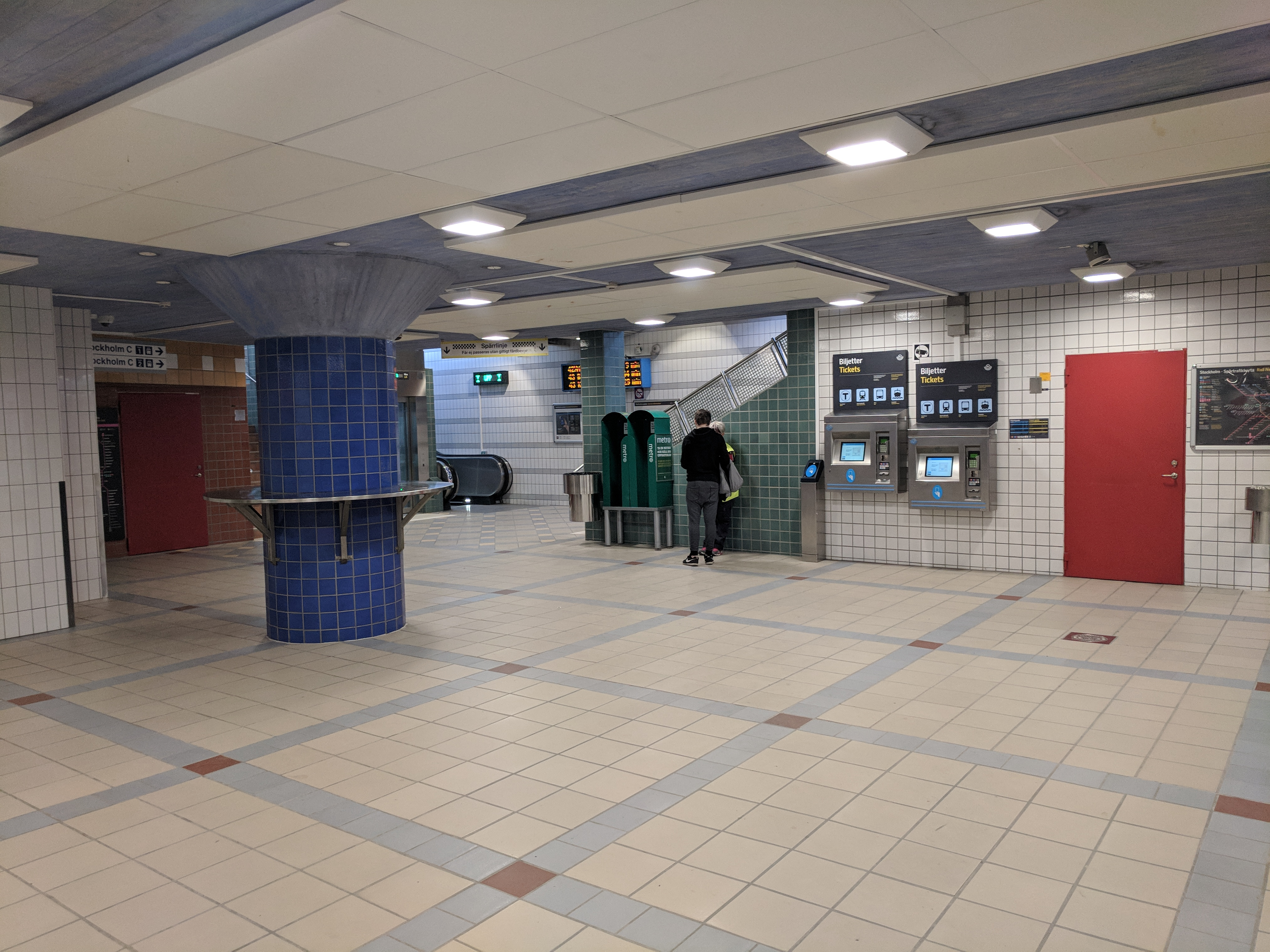
Station hall

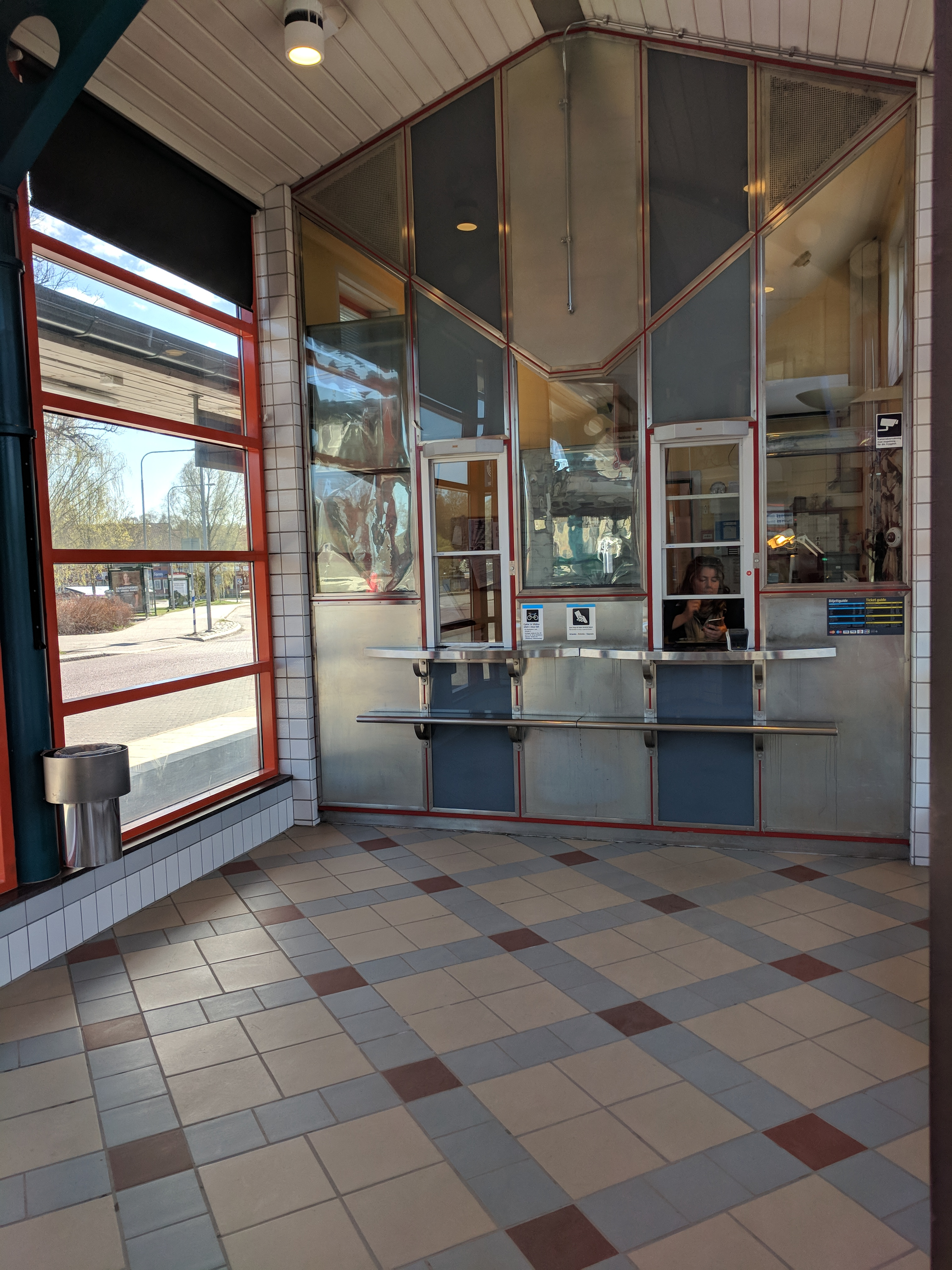
Ticket hall

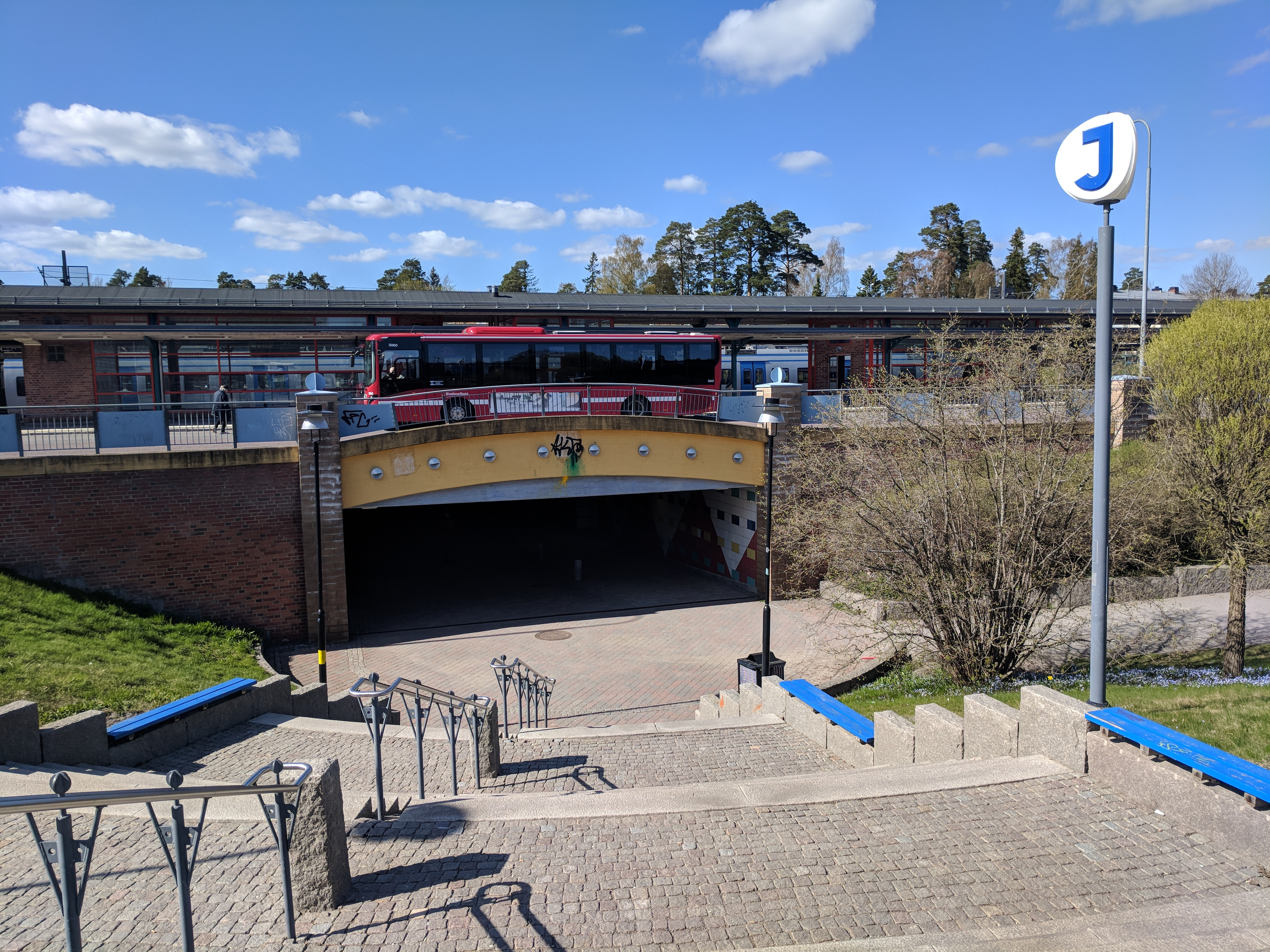
The station
