= Stora Vika =

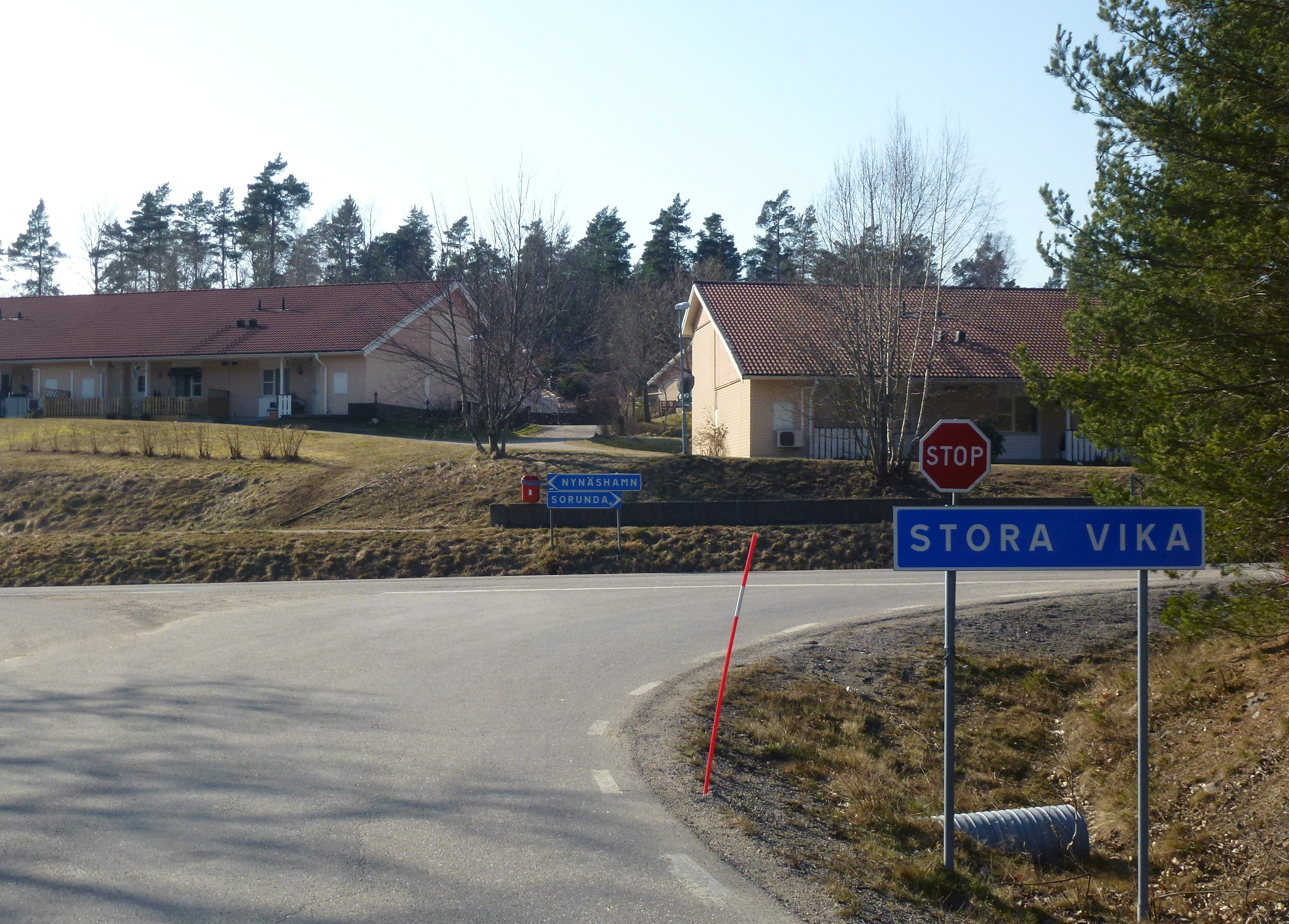
- Stora Vika road sign

- Location within Stockholm Location within Sweden Location within European Union
- Coordinates: 58°56′N 17°48′E
- Country: Sweden
- Province: Södermanland
- County: Stockholm County
- Municipality: Nynäshamn Municipality

Area
  - Total: 0.48 km^{2} (0.19 sq mi)

Population (31 December 2020)
  - Total: 748
  - Density: 1,600/km^{2} (4,000/sq mi)
- Time zone: UTC+1 (CET)
  - Summer (DST): UTC+2 (CEST)

Stora Vika is a locality situated in Nynäshamn Municipality, Stockholm County, Sweden with 651 inhabitants in 2010.
