= Nynäsgård railway station =

Railway station in Nynäshamn, Sweden

Nynäsgård
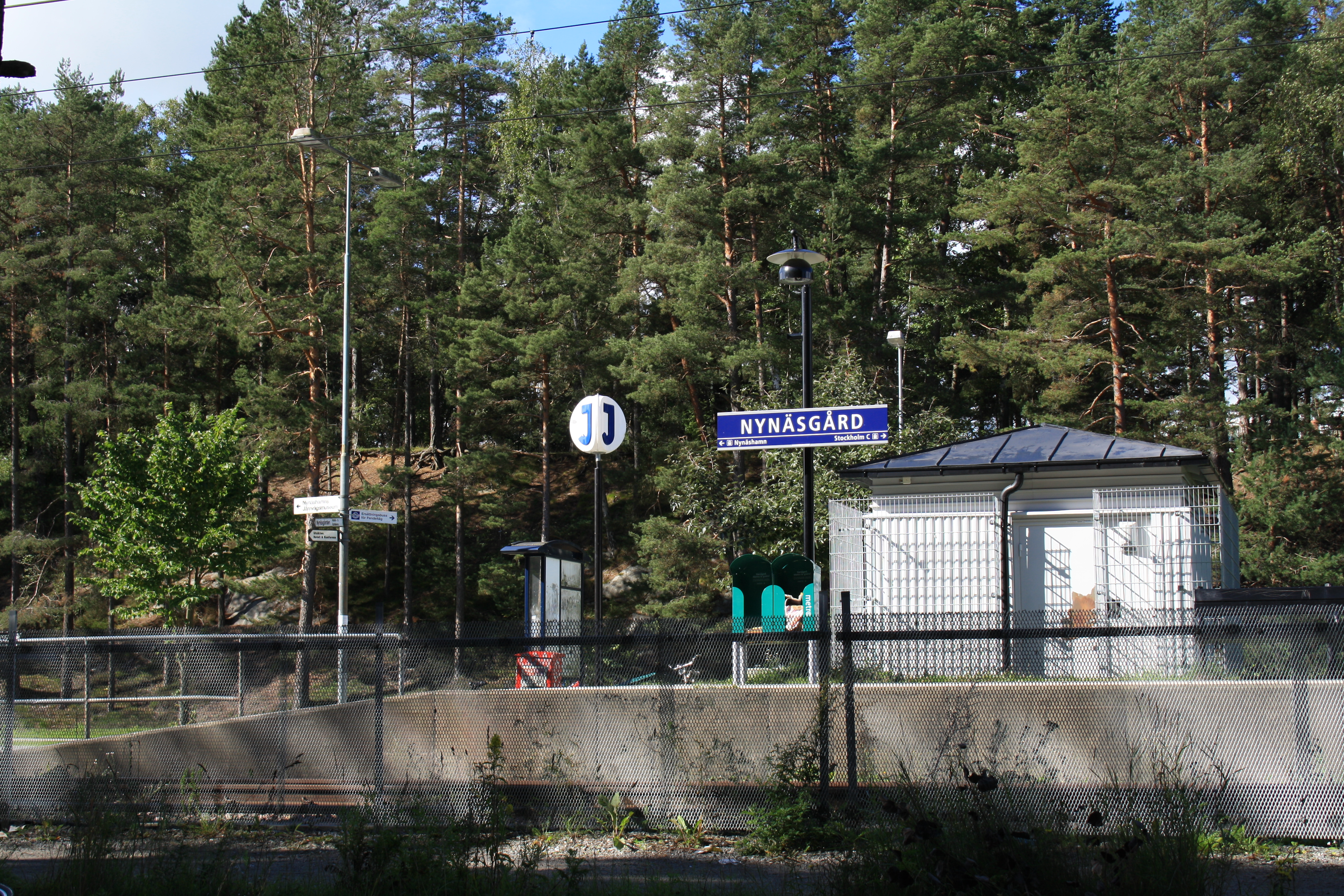
- Nynäsgård station in 2010

General information
- Location: Stockholm County
- Coordinates: 58°54′48″N 17°56′33″E
- System: Pendeltåg
- Owner: Swedish Transport Administration
- Platforms: 2 Side Platforms
- Tracks: 2

Construction
- Structure type: At-grade

Other information
- Station code: Ngd

History
- Opened: 1901
- Rebuilt: 2011
- Former names: Kullsta (until 1916)

Passengers
- 2015: 1,000 boarding per weekday (commuter rail)

Services
Preceding station	Stockholm commuter rail	Following station
Ösmo towards Bålsta	43	Gröndalsviken towards Nynäshamn
Ösmo towards Kallhäll	43X	Gröndalsviken towards Nynäshamn
Location

Nynäsgård is a station on Stockholm's commuter rail network, located 60.6 km from Stockholm Central Station and 3.3 km from Nynäshamn railway station on the Nynäs Line. The station has two side platforms and no ticket barriers. As of 2015, the station had approximately 1,000 boardings per weekday.

== History ==
The station was originally opened in 1901 under the name "Kullsta," but it was renamed "Nynäsgård" in 1916.

The name was derived from the nearby Nynäs estate, home to professor Hjalmar Sjögren, one of the founders of both Nynäshamn and the Nynäs Line. Originally, authorities considered naming the station "Gropen," referring to the excavation through the sand ridge during railway construction, but this was not approved.

A station building was moved from Trångsund to Nynäsgård in 1932, along with the addition of an open waiting hall on one gable side. The building was demolished in the early 1970s.

The station's single-side platform was upgraded and extended in 2008, and on November 21, 2011, the station was rebuilt with an additional track and platform for passing trains.

== Railway Museum ==
The former maintenance facility for Nynäs Line trains, which operated until 1962, now houses the Nynäshamn Railway Museum with vintage steam locomotives, railcars, and a preserved roundhouse. The site was designated a listed building in 1999. The museum operates heritage trains on the Nynäs Line on occasion.

== Gallery ==
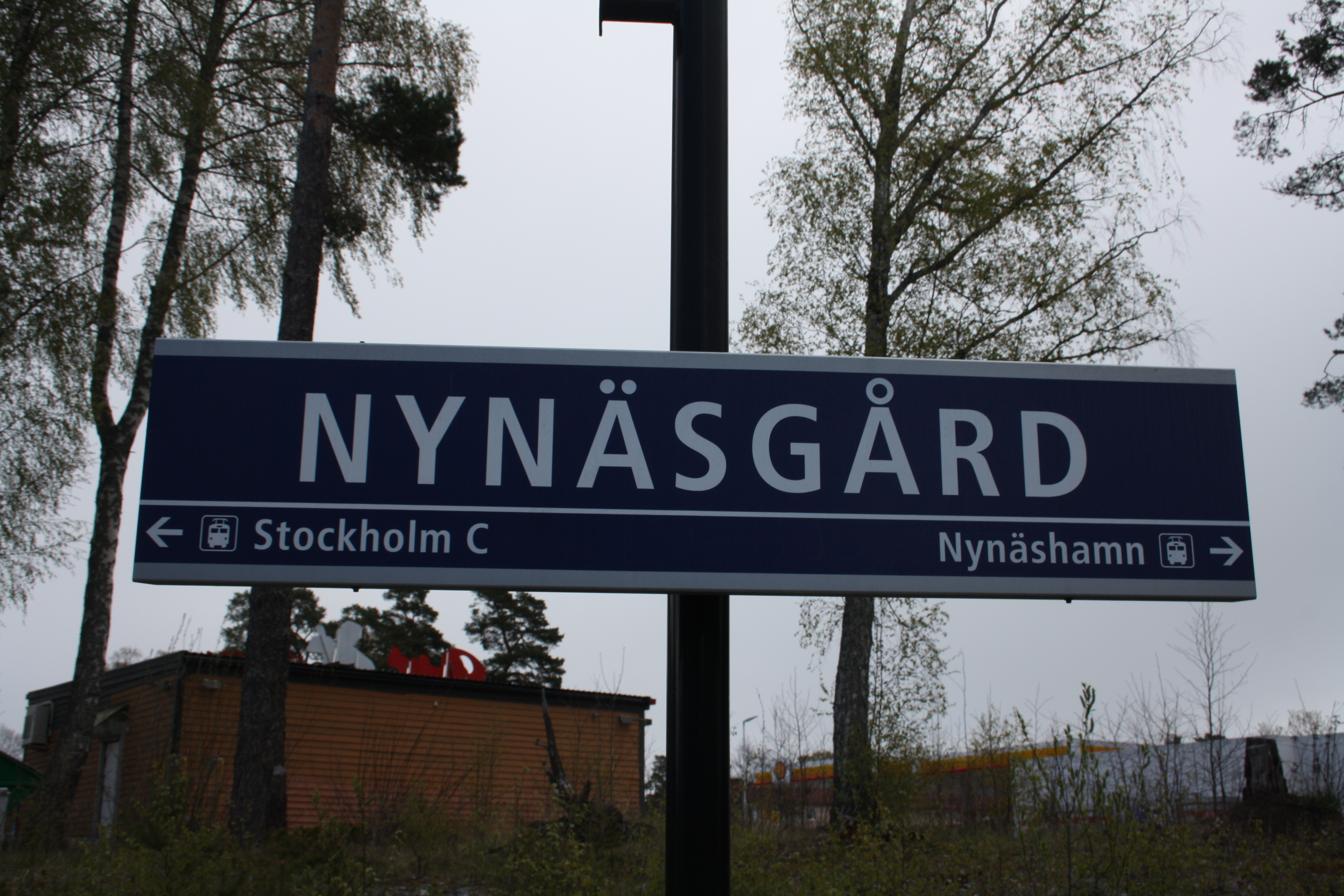
Station sign

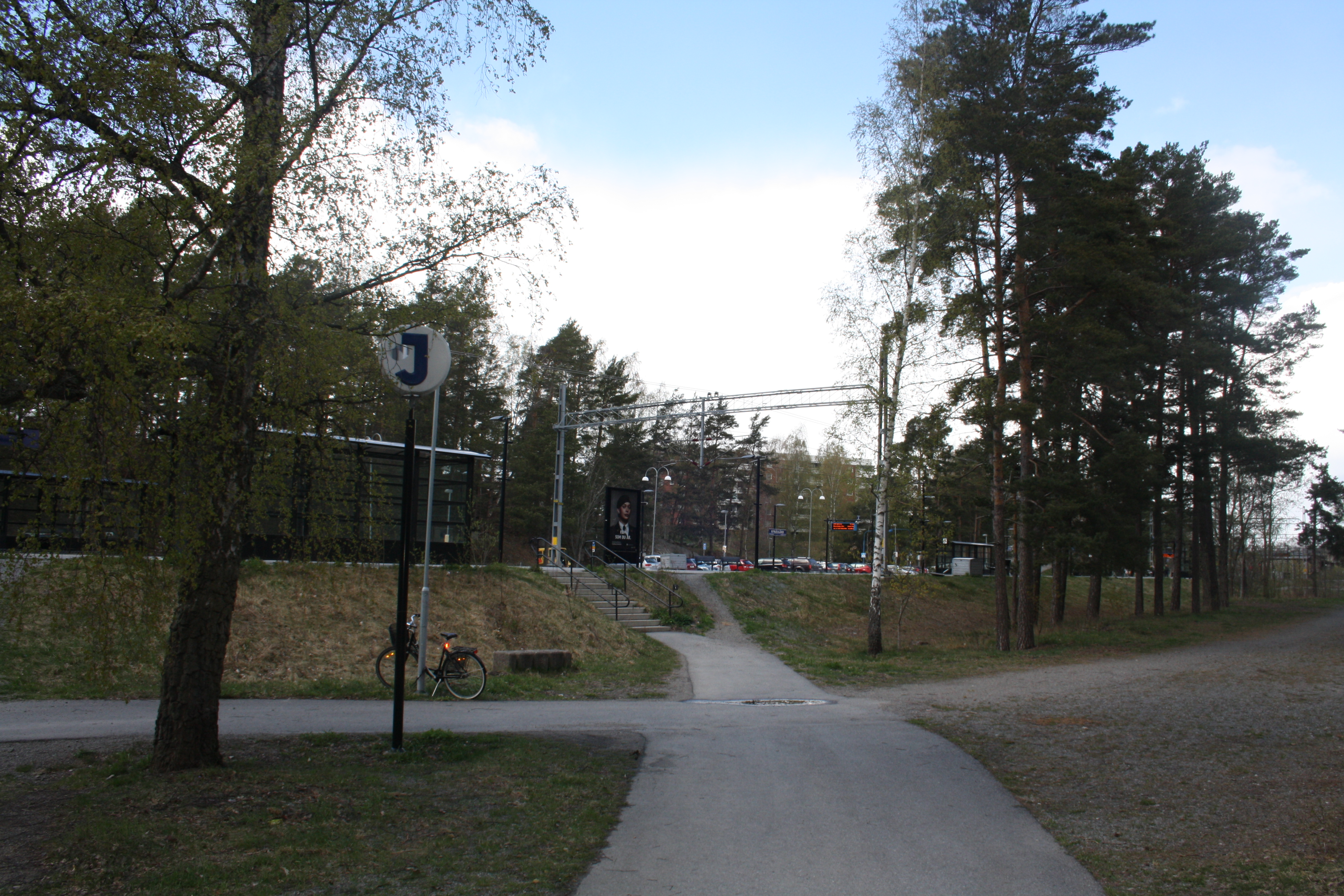
View of the station

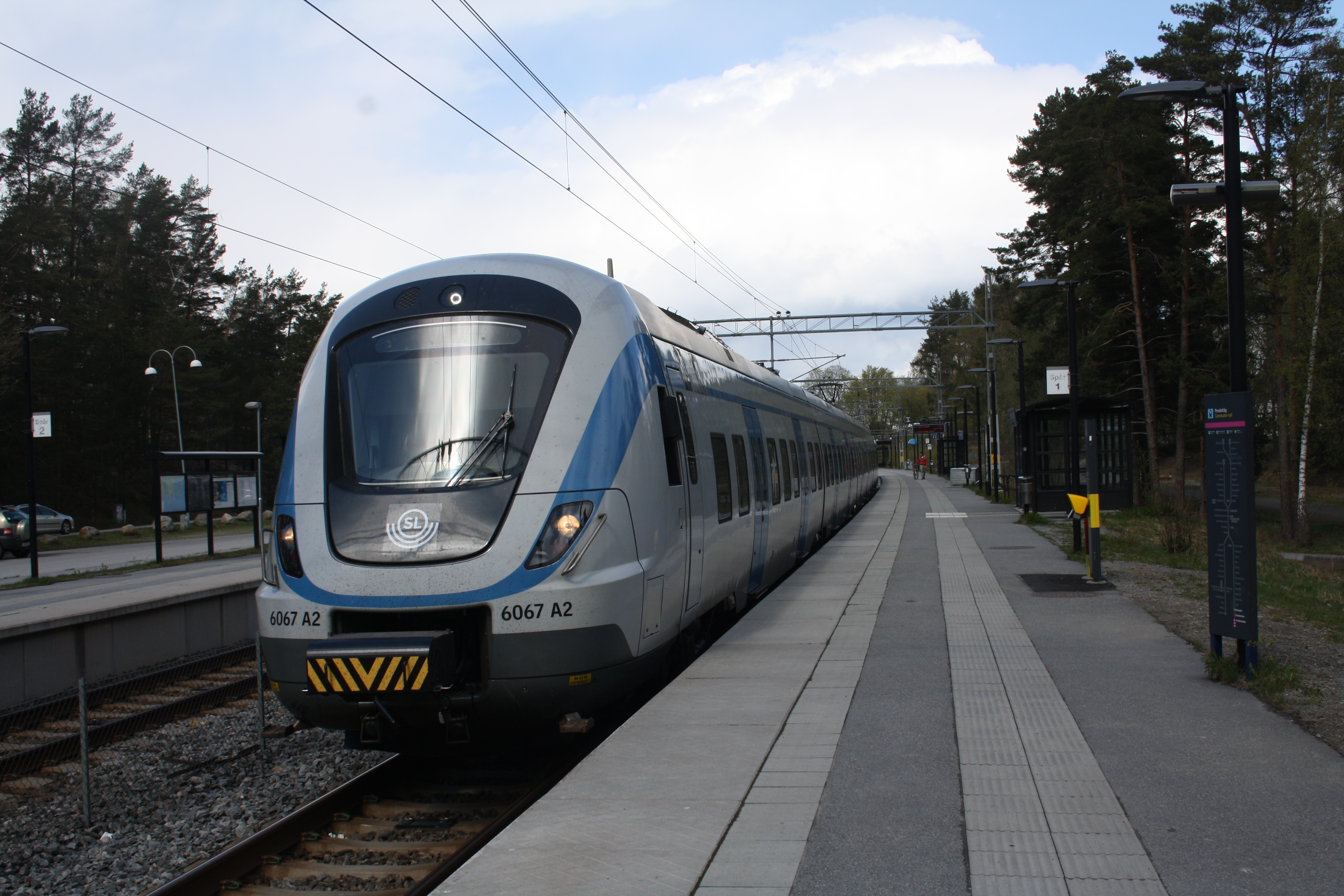
Platform

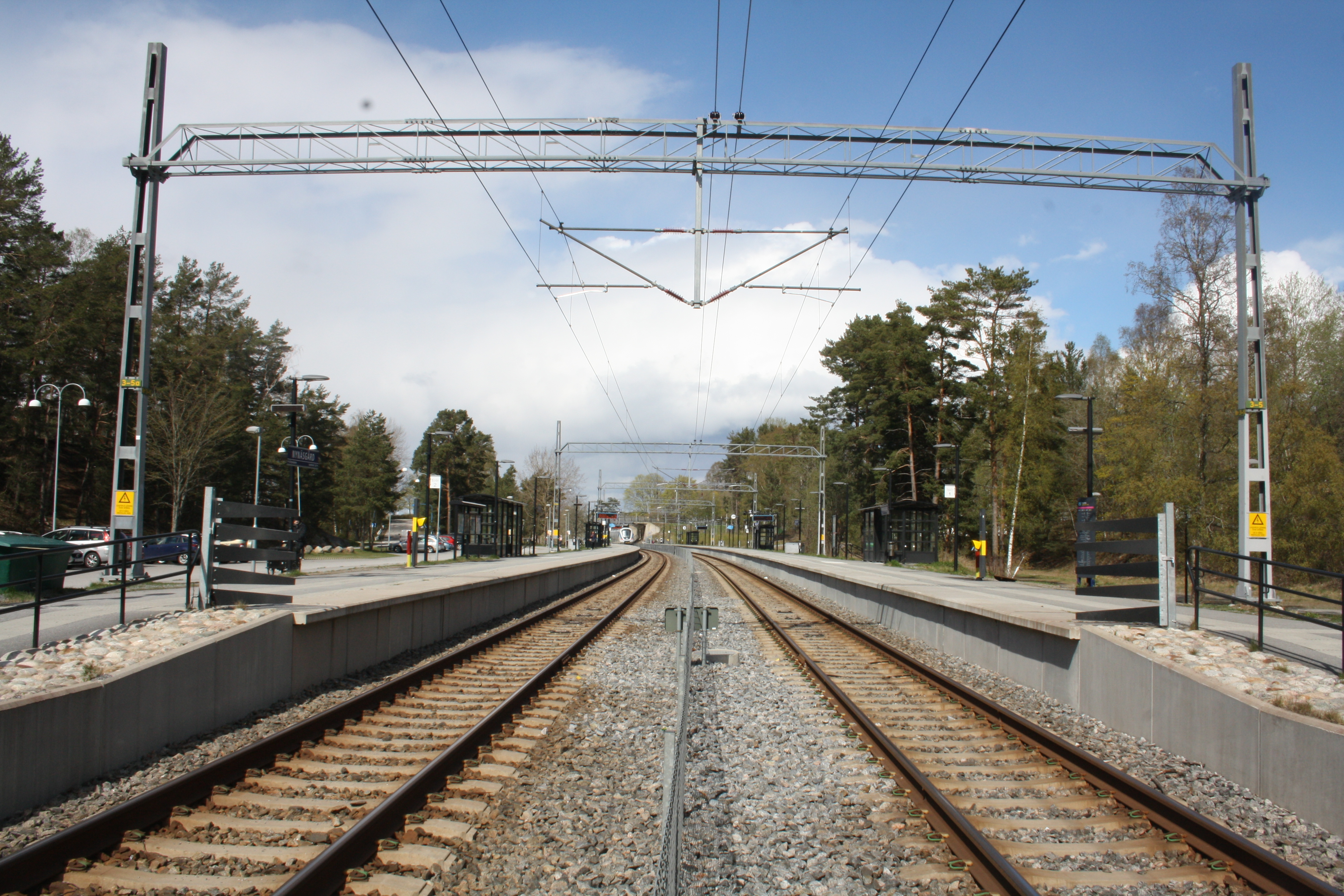
Platform area

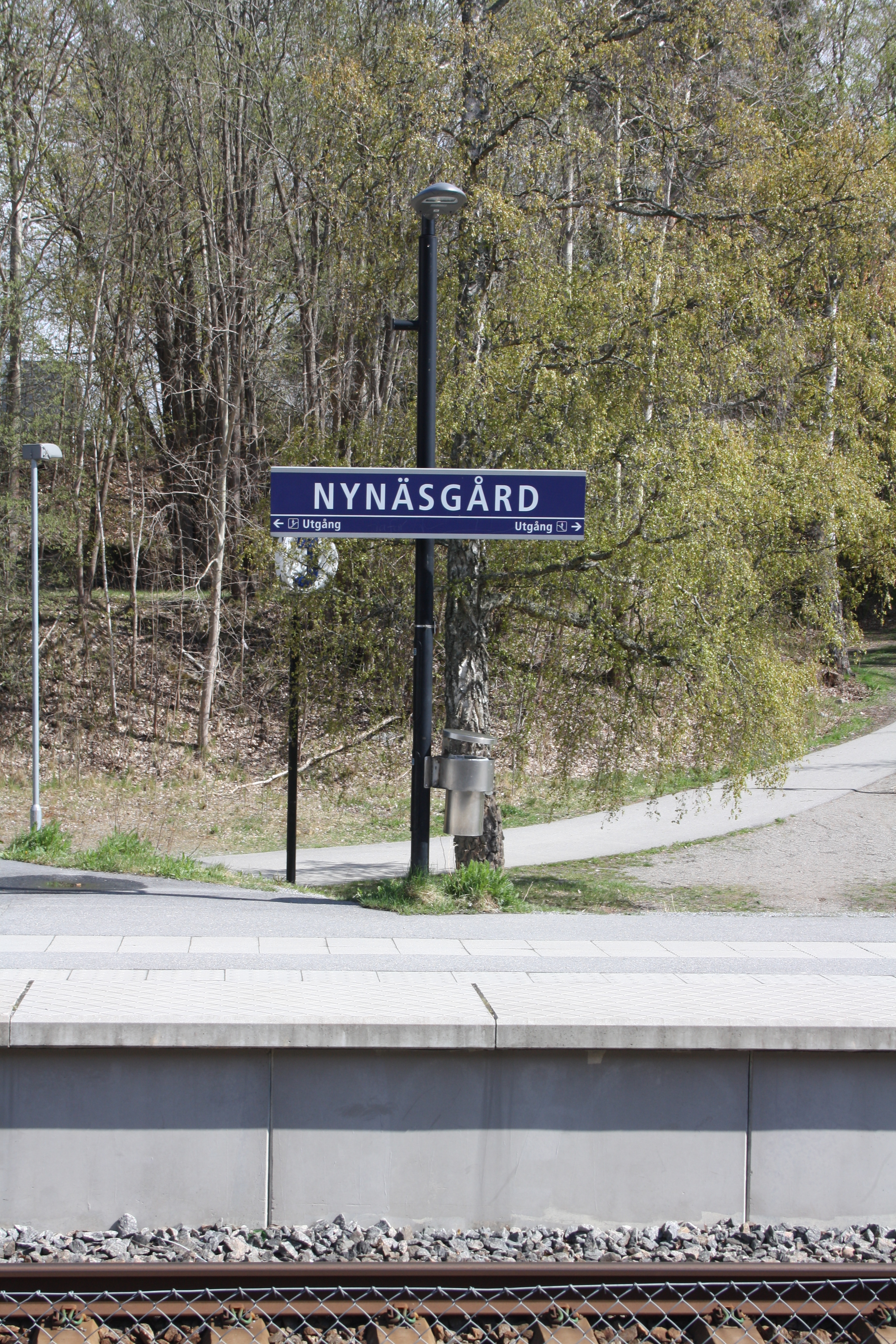
Platform and station sign

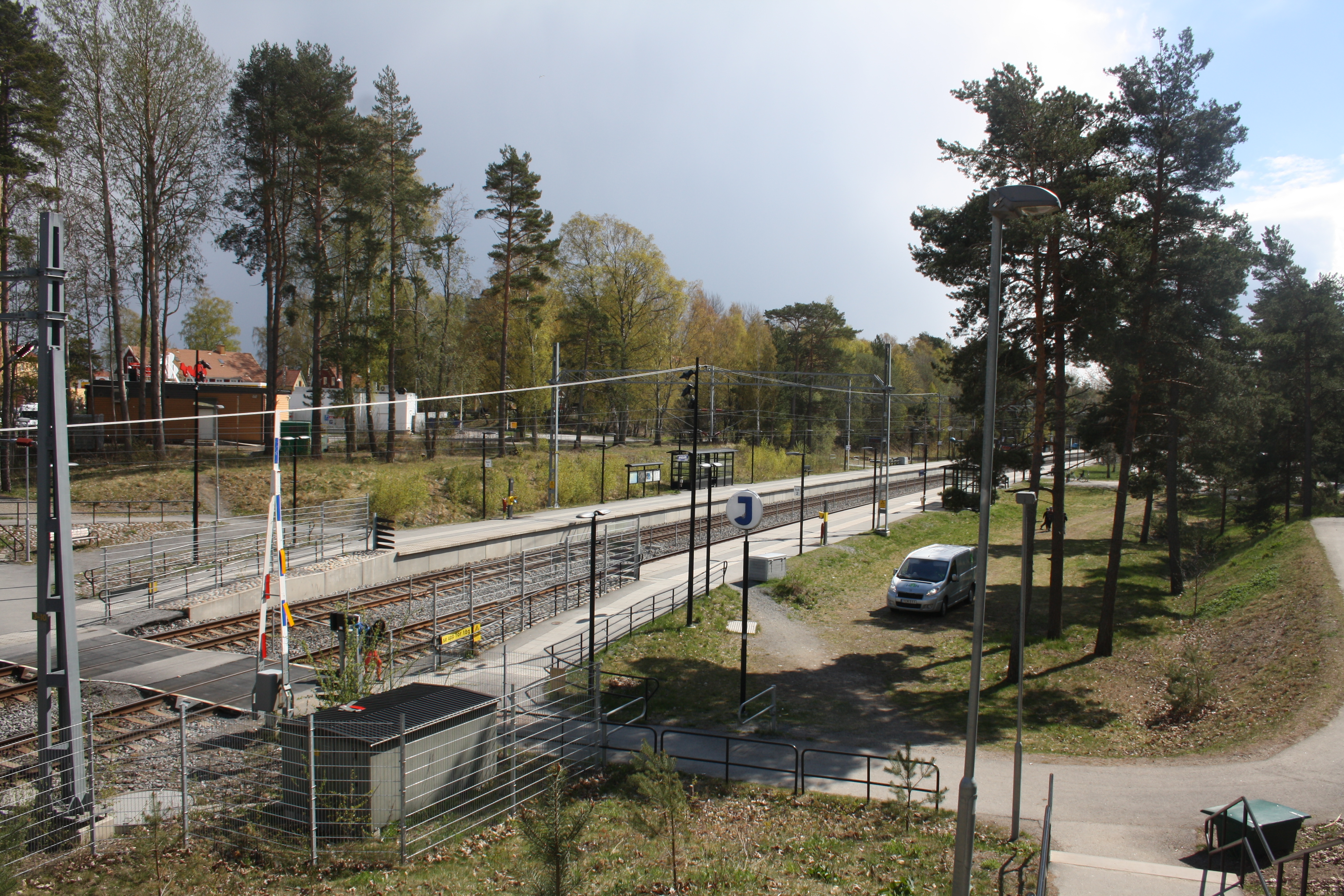
Station area
