= Gröndalsviken railway station =

Railway station in Nynäshamn, Sweden

Gröndalsviken
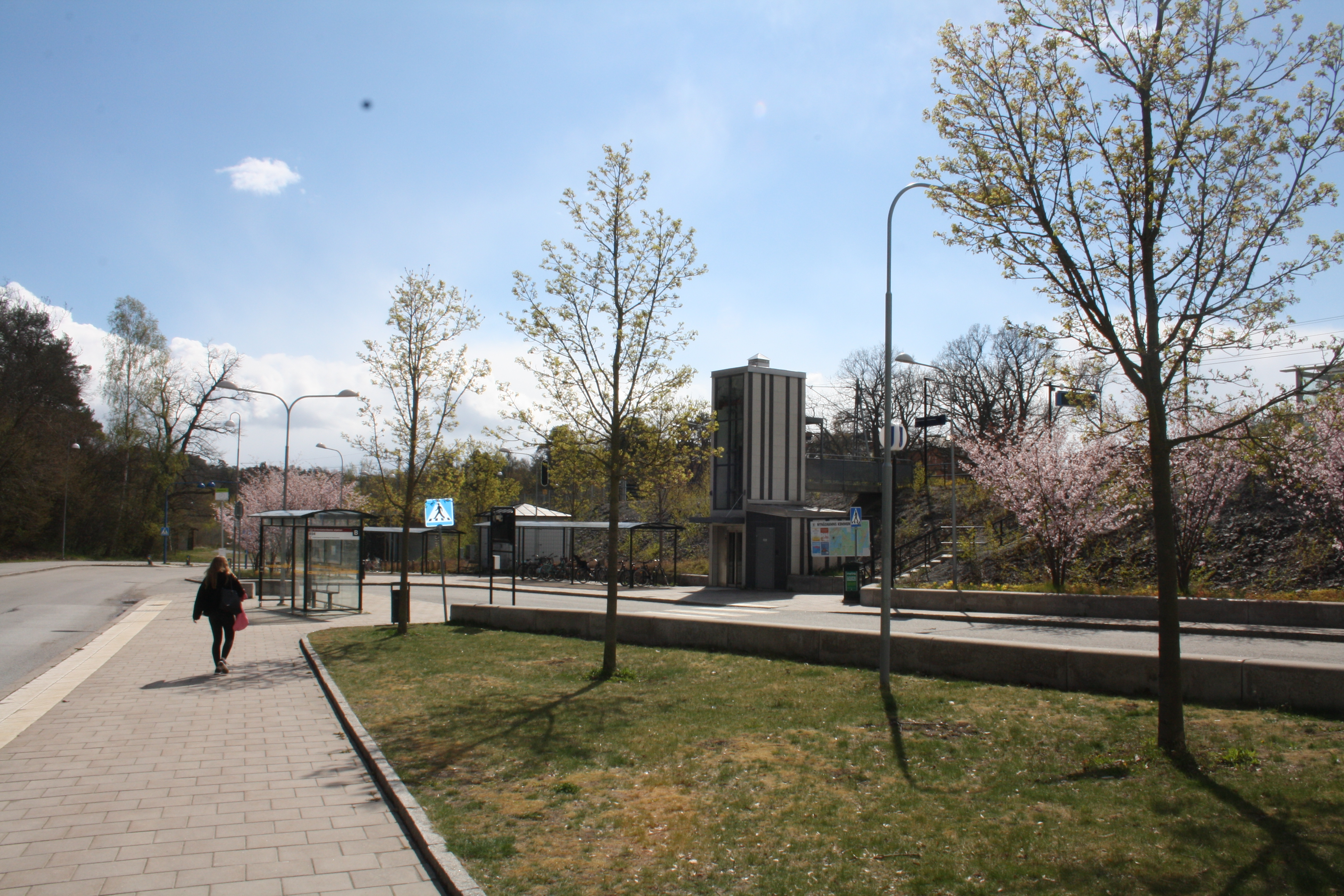
- Gröndalsviken station

General information
- Location: Nynäshamn; Sweden
- Coordinates: 58°53′59.1″N 17°55′48.7″E
- System: Pendeltåg
- Owner: Swedish Transport Administration
- Line: Nynäs Line
- Platforms: 1 side platform
- Tracks: 1

Construction
- Structure type: At-grade
- Parking: Park & ride
- Accessible: Yes

Other information
- Station code: Gdv

History
- Opened: 18 August 2008

Passengers
- 2015: 700 boardings per weekday (2015) (commuter rail)

Services
Preceding station	Stockholm commuter rail	Following station
Nynäsgård towards Bålsta	43	Nynäshamn Terminus
Nynäsgård towards Kallhäll	43X	Nynäshamn Terminus
Location

Gröndalsviken is a station on Stockholm's commuter rail network, located in the Estö/Gröndal district of central Nynäshamn, 62.4 km from Stockholm Central Station and 1.5 km from Nynäshamn railway station along the Nynäs Line. The station opened on 18 August 2008, replacing the former station at Nynäs havsbad, approximately 800 meters away.

The station consists of a single side platform along a single track and lacks a ticket hall or fare gates. The area surrounding Gröndalsviken includes a park-and-ride facility. As of 2015, the station had approximately 700 boardings per weekday. Along with Bålsta, it is one of the only commuter rail stations in Stockholm with a single track.

== Gallery ==
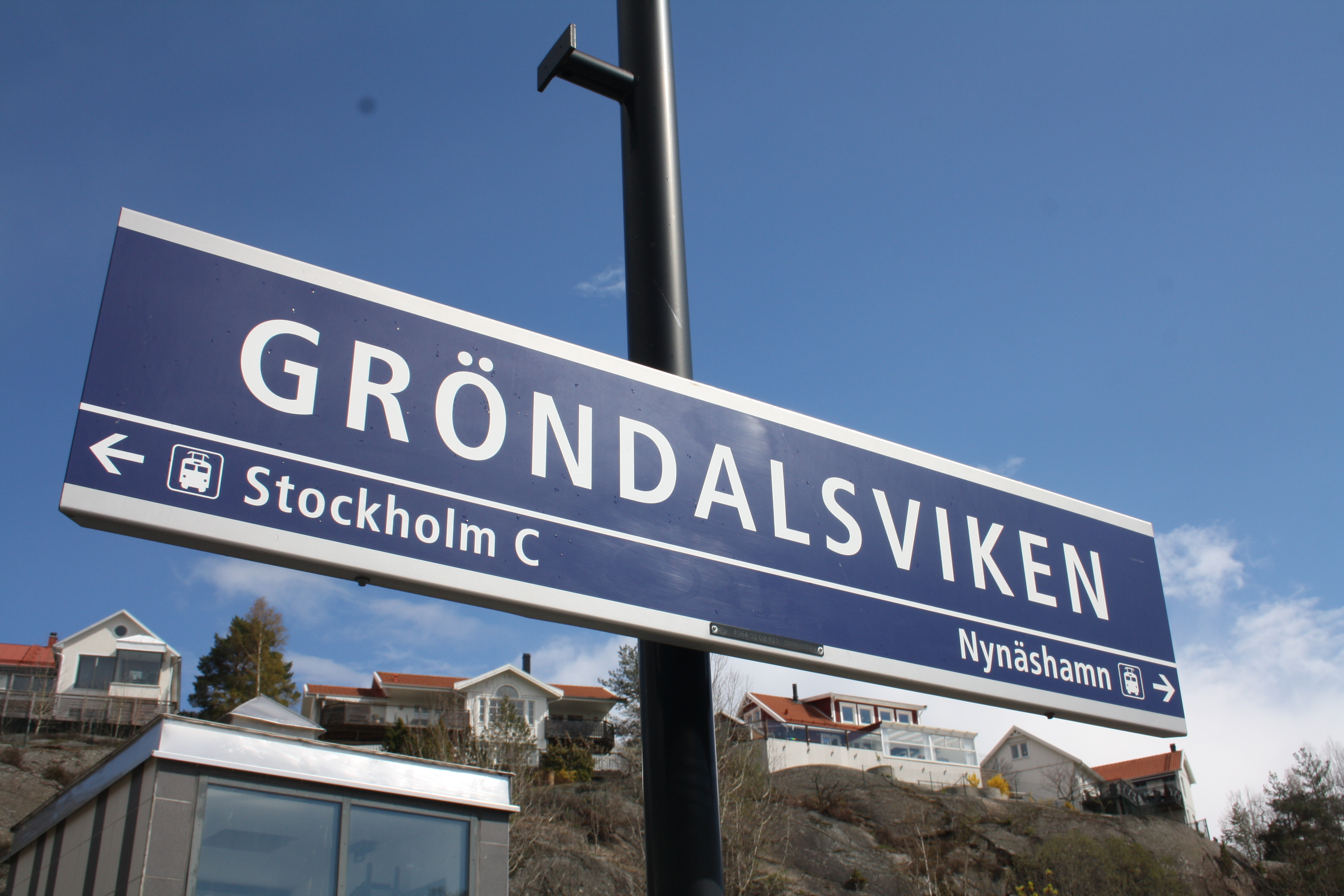
Station sign

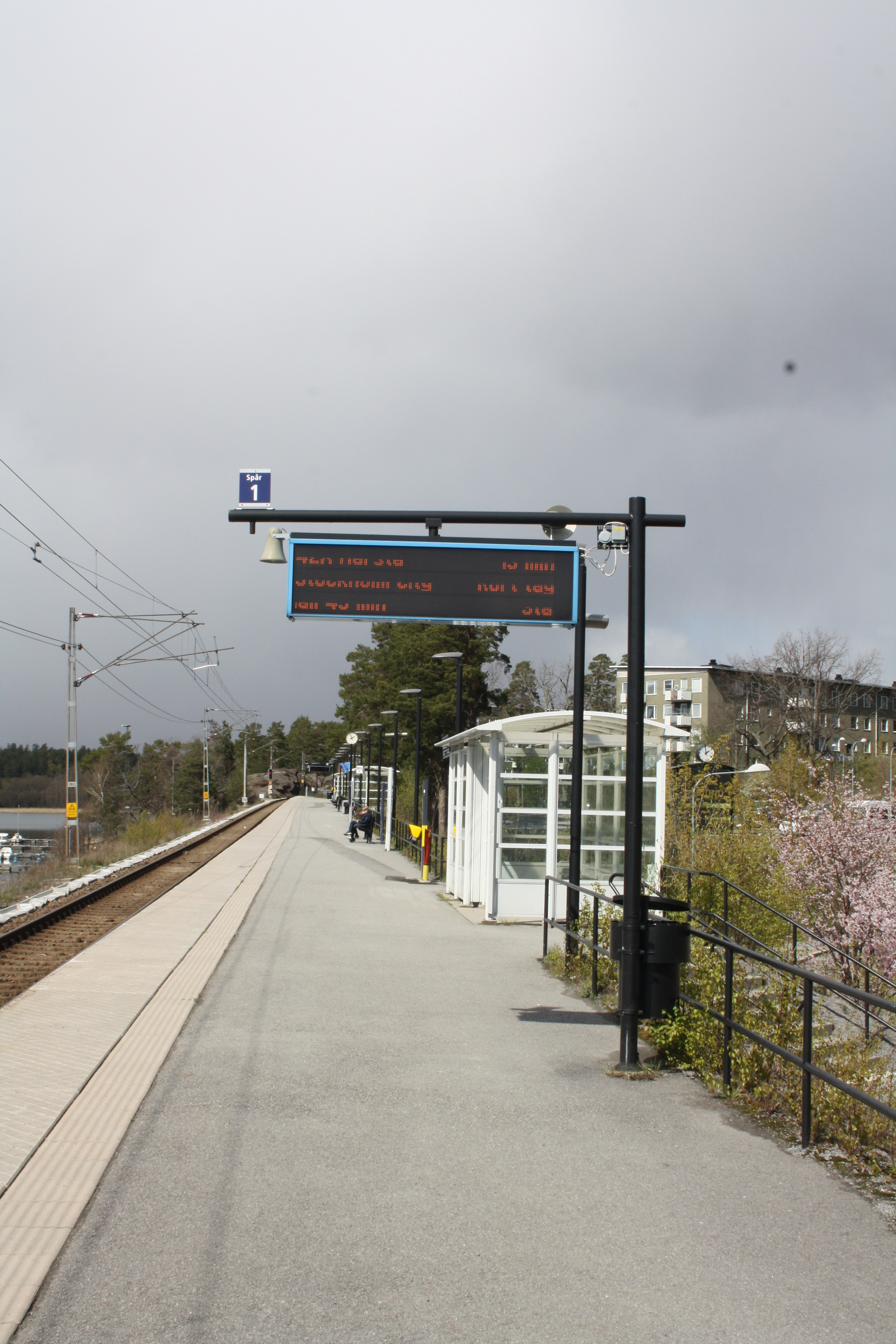
Platform view

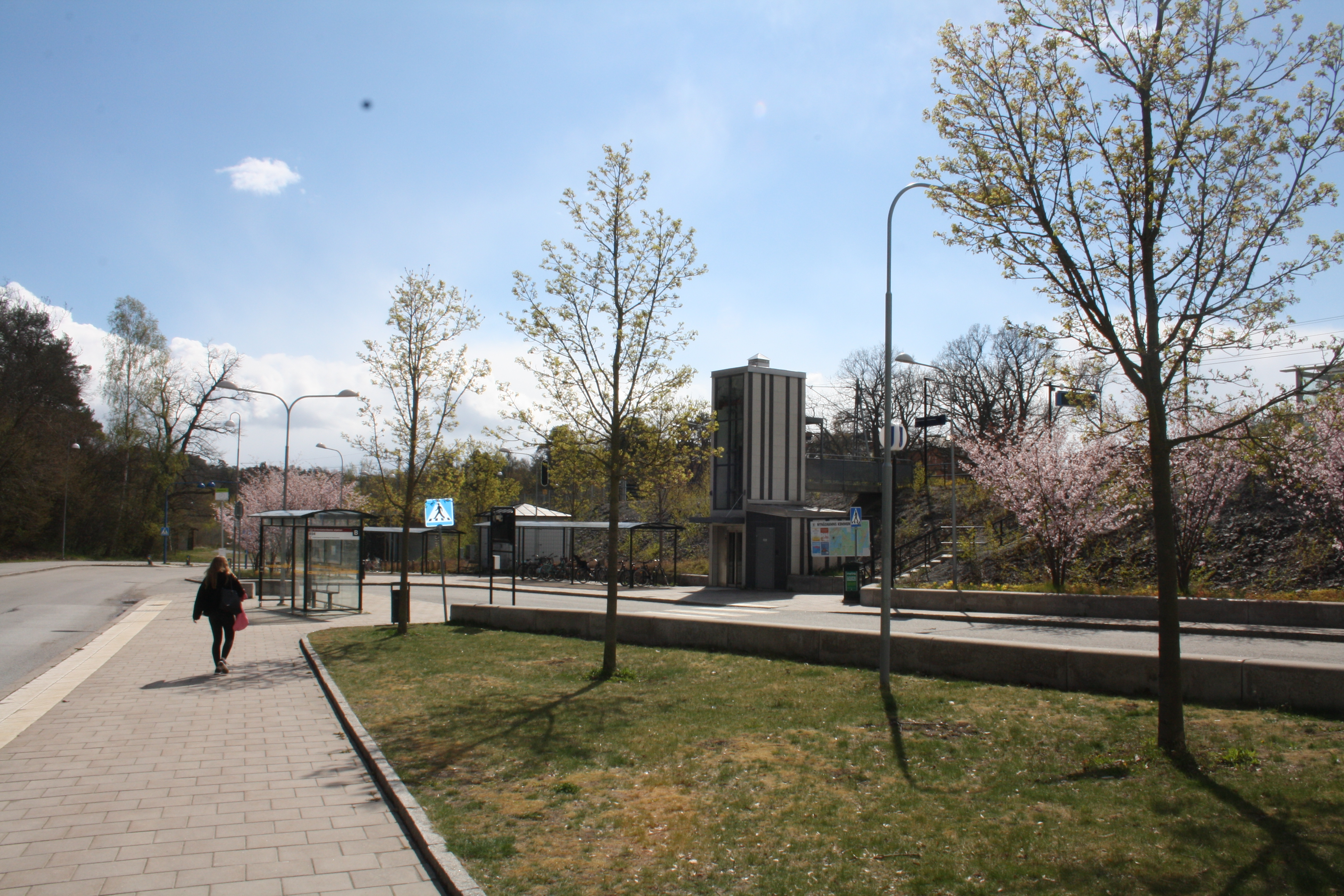
Station area
