= Refined Bitumen Association =

Bitumen trade association of the United Kingdom

- Abbreviation: RBA
- Formation: 1968
- Legal status: Non-profit company
- Location: Harrogate Business Centre, Hammerain House, Hookstone Avenue, Harrogate, HG2 8ER
- Region served: UK
- Members: Five bitumen companies
- Affiliations: Eurobitume
- Website: RBA

The Refined Bitumen Association is the trade association for UK bitumen companies.

== History ==
It was formed in 1968.

=== Asphalt Industry Alliance ===
In 2000, it formed the Asphalt Industry Alliance with the Mineral Products Association, based in London. Asphalt is a mixture of bitumen and quarried mineral products, represented by both trade organisations.

== Structure ==
Its five main members cover 95% of the UK market

- ExxonMobil Bitumen, based in Leatherhead, Surrey
- Nynas UK (a Swedish company), based in Eastham, Merseyside, Wirral, north of Ellesmere Port
- Petroplus Bitumen (formerly BP Bitumen before Petroplus bought the Coryton Refinery in 2007), based in Llandarcy, Neath Port Talbot
- Shell Bitumen, based in Wythenshawe
- Total Bitumen UK Ltd, based in Ashton-on-Ribble in Preston, Lancashire

== Function ==
It represents the UK bitumen industry at a national level. The UK produces around 1.5 million tonnes of bitumen a year. 90% of UK bitumen is used on roads.
