= Rosenlundsskogen Nature Reserve =

Nature reserve in Stockholm, Sweden

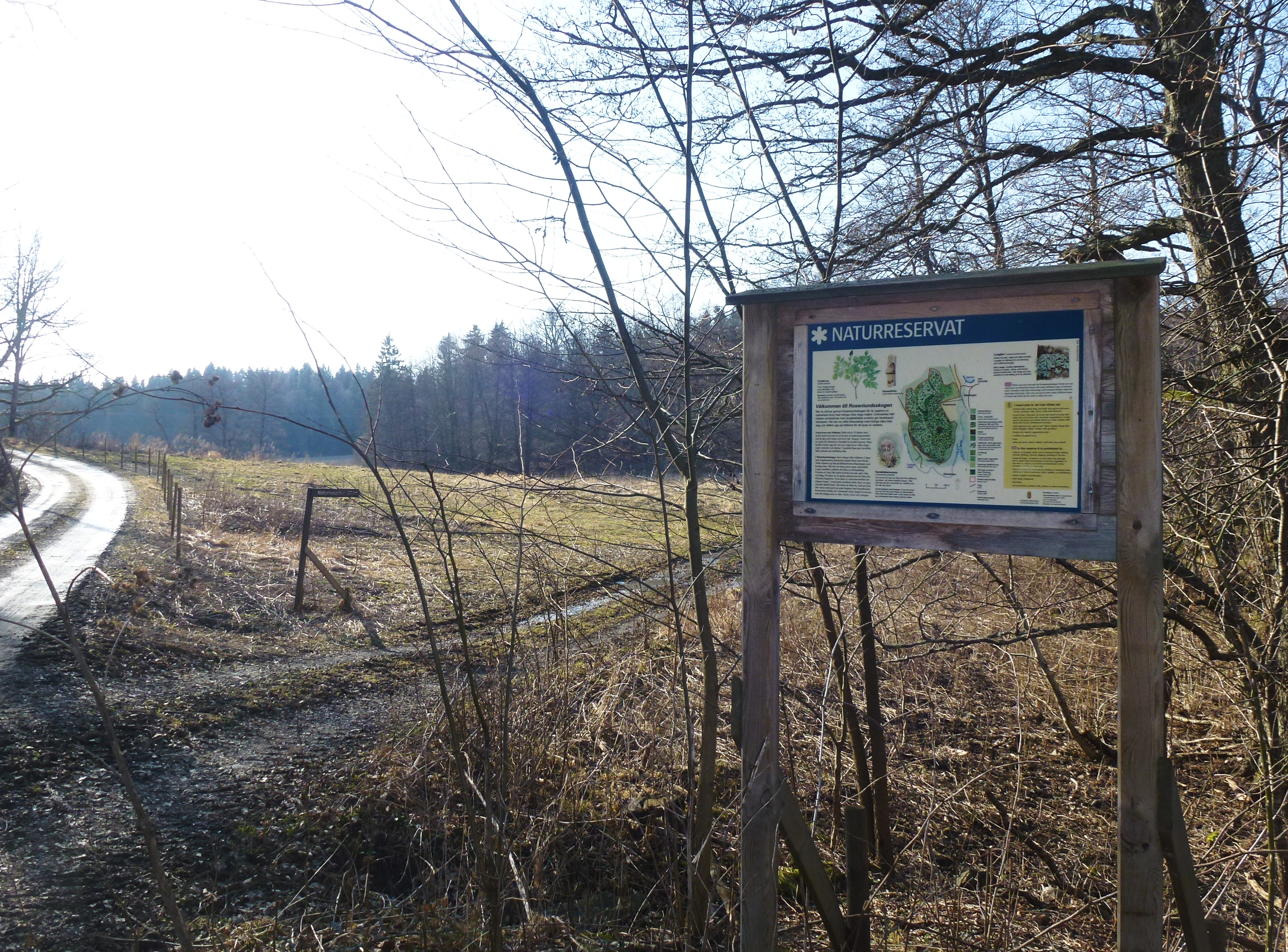

- Location within Stockholm
- Location: Sweden
- Nearest city: Nynäshamn
- Coordinates: 58°55′00″N 17°48′40″E
- Area: 35 ha (86 acres)
- Established: 2004

Rosenlundsskogen Nature Reserve (Swedish: Rosenlundsskogens naturreservat) is a nature reserve in Stockholm County in Sweden.

Centred on the Rosenlund forest, this nature reserve contains a large array of different kinds of relatively old forest within its area. The topography of the nature reserve is varied, with damper areas interspersed with drier areas of bare rock and other kinds of vegetation. The large variety of forest types and topography means that the reserve is an area with unusual high biodiversity.
