= Drottningviken =

Coordinates: 57°35′30″N 11°54′4″E

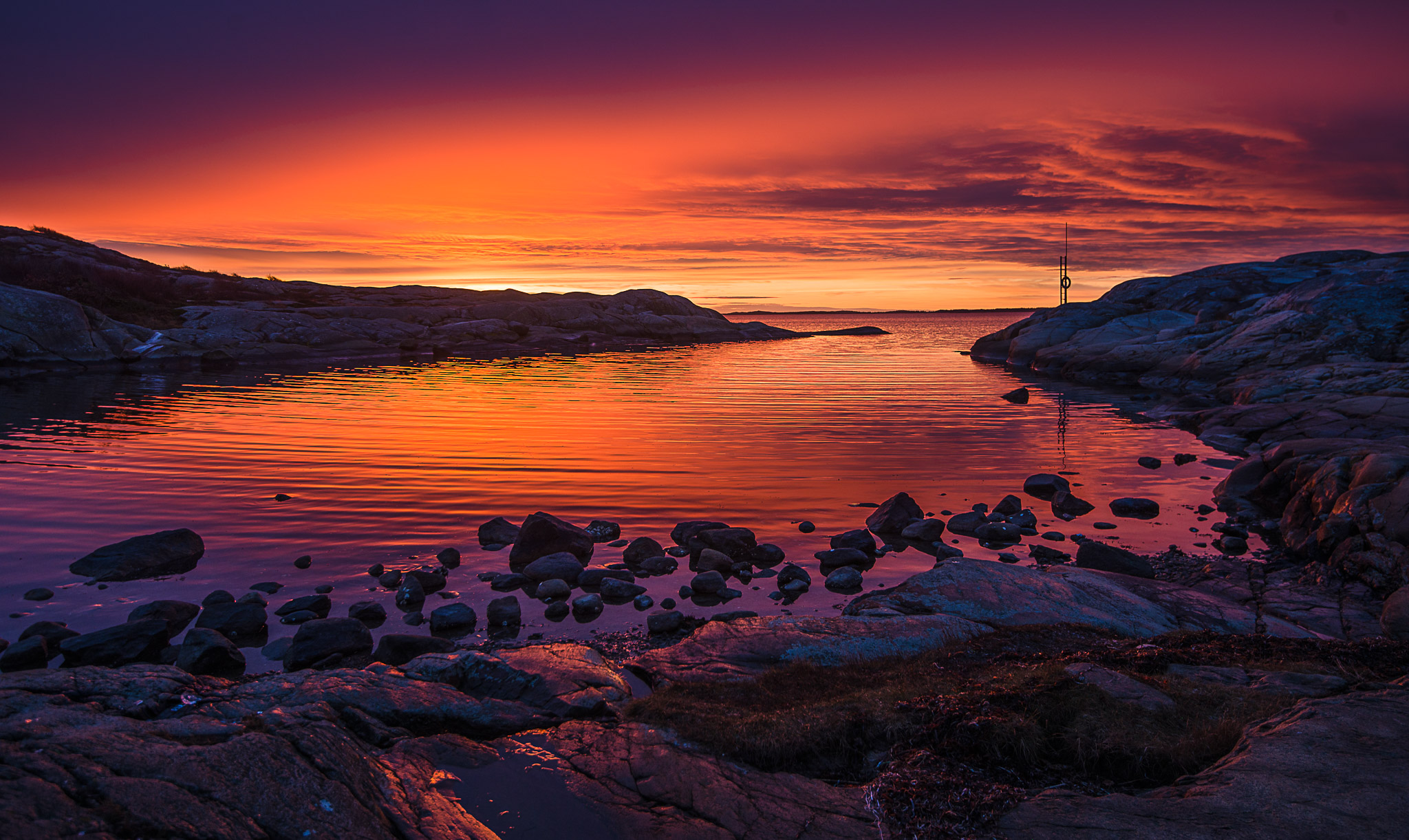
Drottningviken bay

Drottningviken is the name of a small bay in Nynäshamn, Sweden. The bay is a popular training ground among scuba divers in the Nynäshamn and Stockholm regions, due to its shallow and accessible waters.
