= Nynäshamn railway station =

Railway station in Nynäshamn, Sweden

Nynäshamn
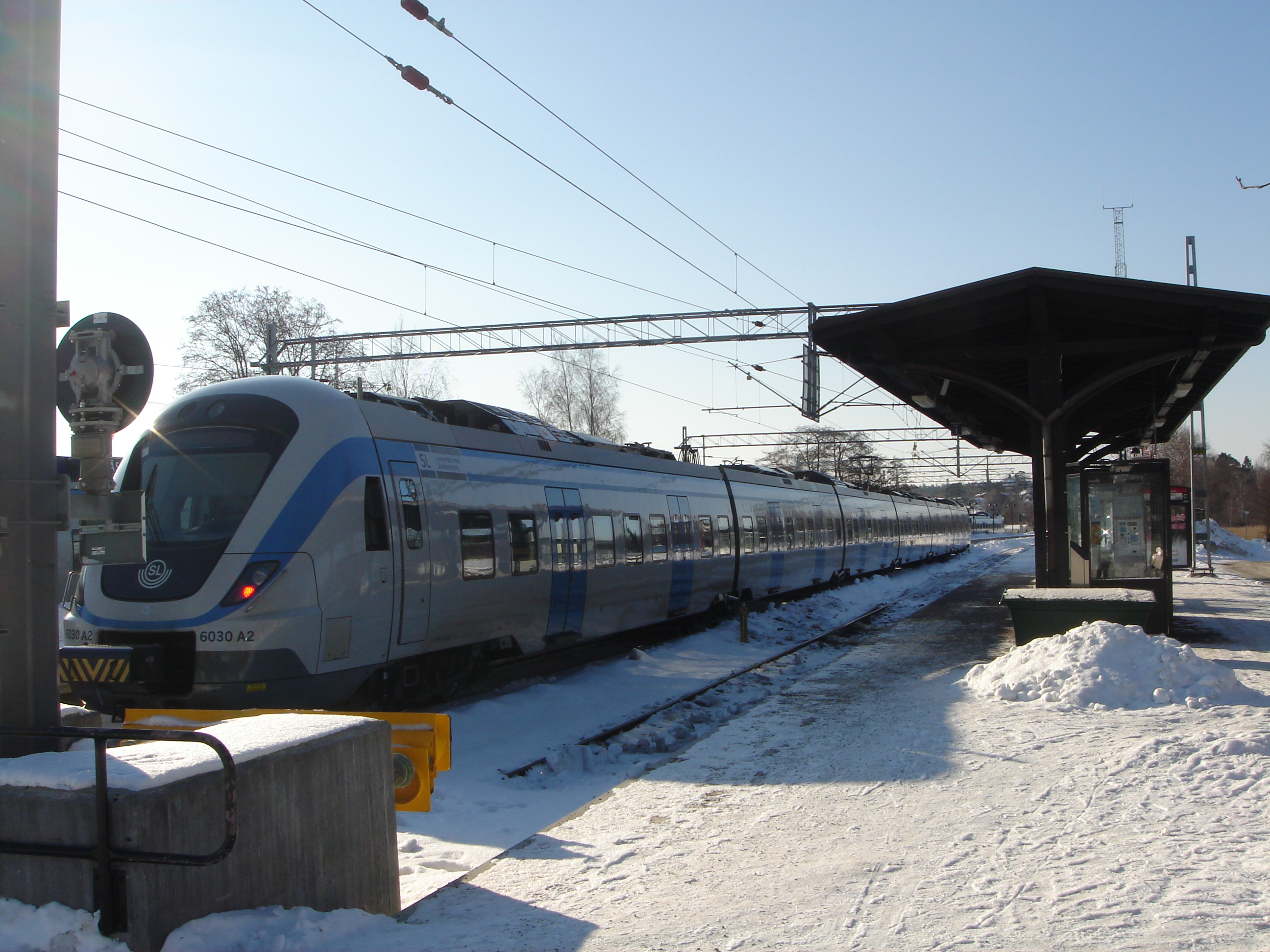
- Nynäshamn Station in 2011

General information
- Location: Nynäshamn, Nynäshamn Municipality; Stockholm County; Sweden
- Coordinates: 58°57′N 17°55′E
- System: Pendeltåg
- Operator: SL
- Line: Nynäs Line
- Distance: 62.8 km (39.0 mi) from Stockholm C
- Platforms: 2
- Tracks: 3
- Connections: Port of Nynäshamn

Construction
- Architect: Ferdinand Boberg

History
- Opened: 1901

Passengers
- 2019: 1,000 boarding per weekday (commuter rail)

Services
Preceding station	Stockholm commuter rail	Following station
Gröndalsviken towards Märsta	42X	Terminus
Gröndalsviken towards Kallhäll	43X	Terminus
Gröndalsviken towards Bålsta	43	Terminus
Location
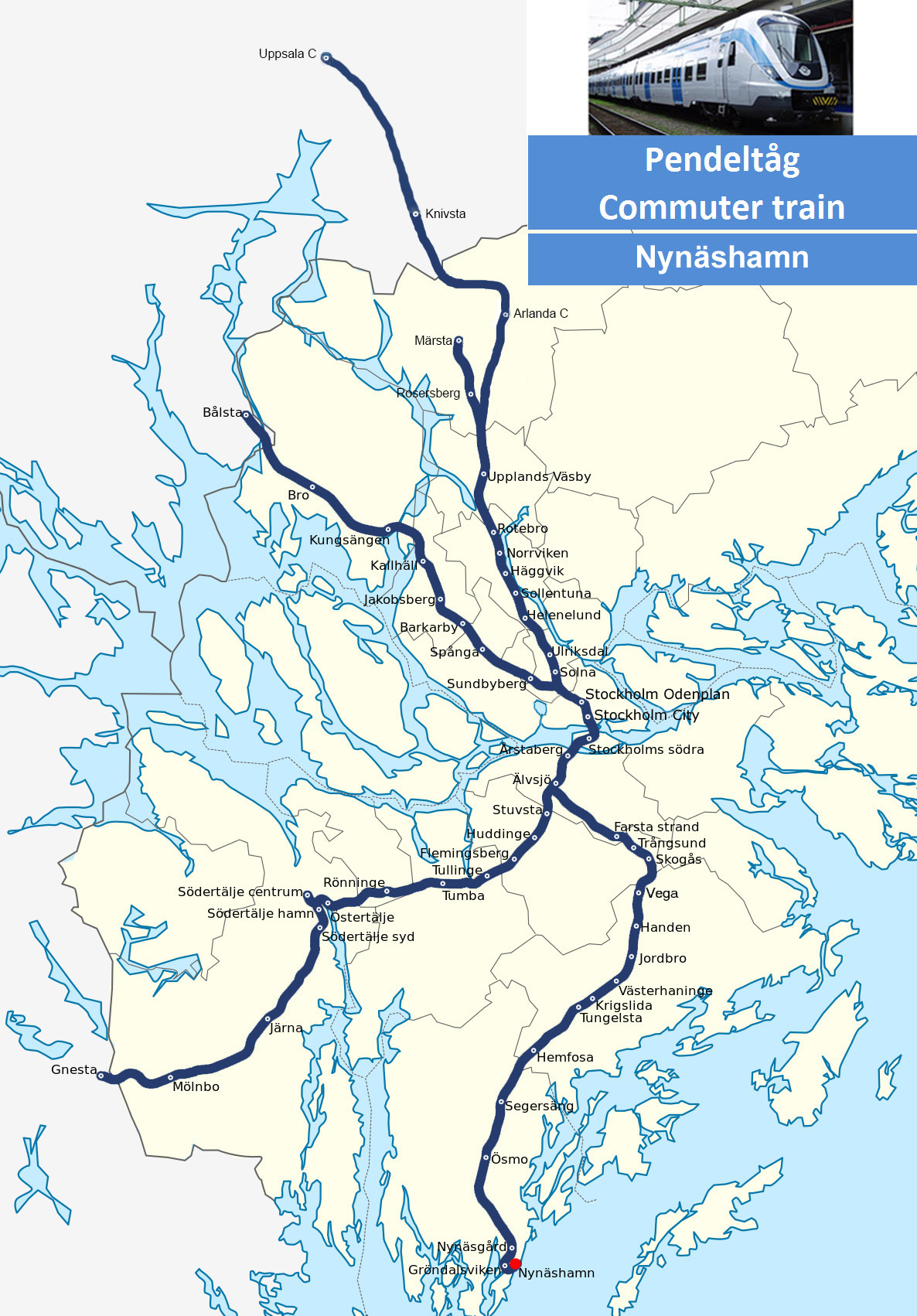

Nynäshamn is a station on Stockholm's commuter train network, located in Nynäshamn within Nynäshamn Municipality and is the terminus for the Nynäs Line. On a normal winter weekday, the station has about 900 boarders (2015). The station has three tracks, which end with stop buffers. Entrance to the platform is geographically from the north (the track runs in a half loop through the city and ends in the "wrong" direction). The station no longer has an entrance building or ticket hall, but has weather protection on the platform. Nynäshamn is used as a transfer to the Destination Gotland ferries to the island of Gotland.

== History ==
The station was built as part of the Nynäs Line, and was opened to traffic in 1901. The old station building was designed by the architect Ferdinand Boberg. It is a wooden building with yellow-painted facades and has a similar appearance to other station buildings line, also designed by Boberg. Today, the building is owned by housing association Nynäshamnsbostäder.

The old station building is located some distance from the track area itself. This is it was originally planned for the tracks to end in front of the building. However, a longer track was built to enable direct connection to the Gotland boats. This occurred in the years 1902-1973 and 1995-2007.

In 2007, the platform located just beside Nynäshamn Ferry Terminal was closed to allow expansion of the ferry terminal, and the track was shortened by 500m to the current terminus.

== Gallery ==
=== Station Building ===
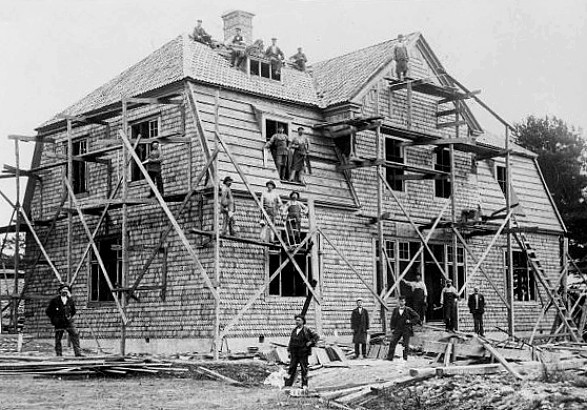
Old station building under construction, 1900-1901

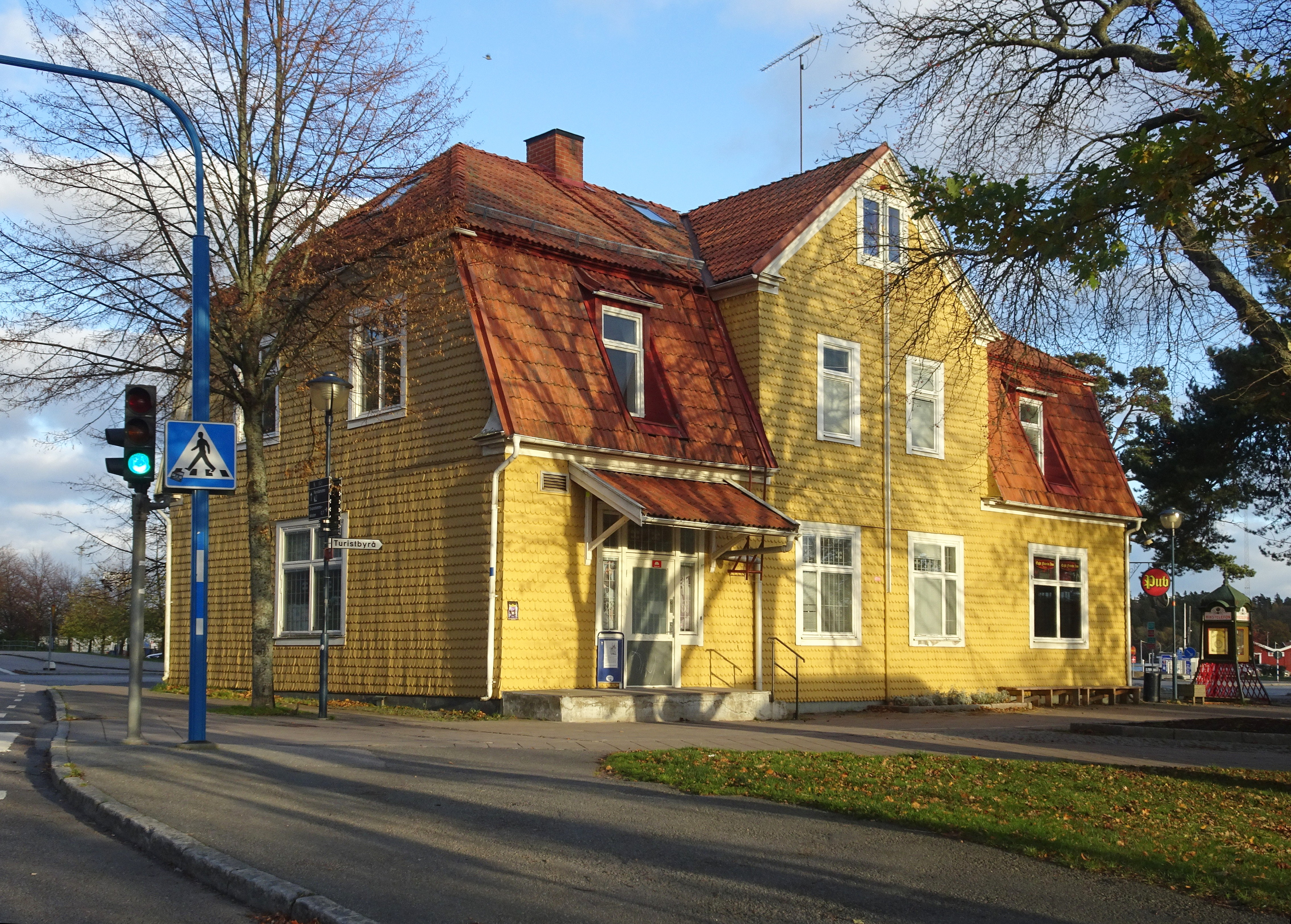
Old Station Building

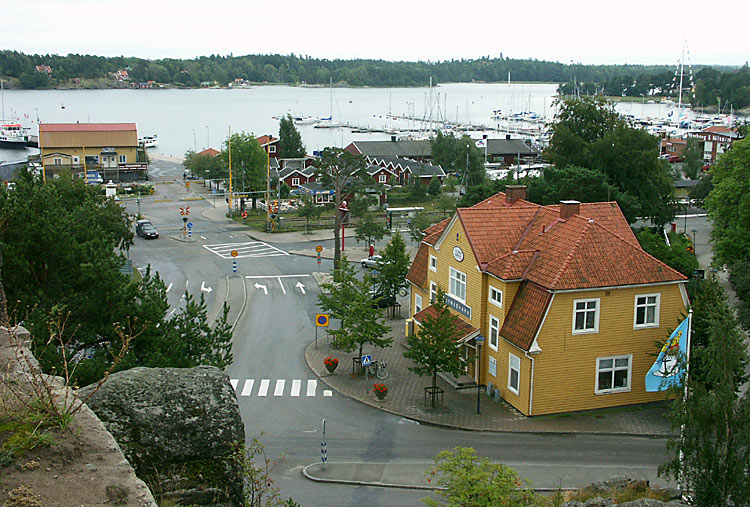
Old station building, showing previous track extension

=== Station Platforms ===
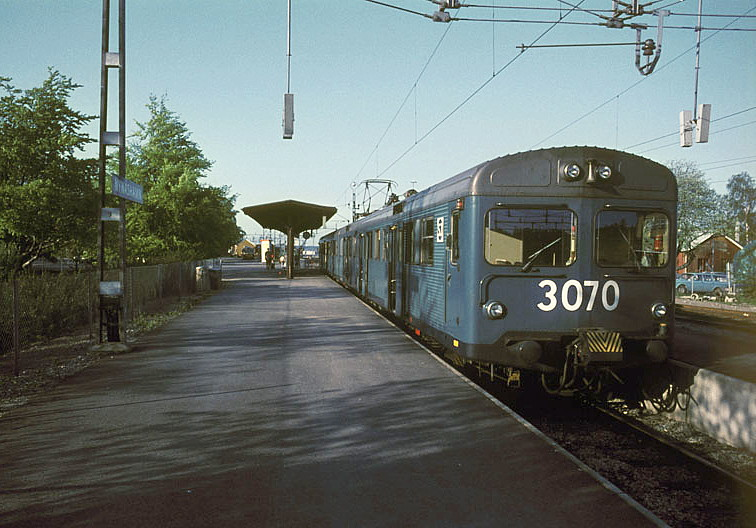
Platform in 1975

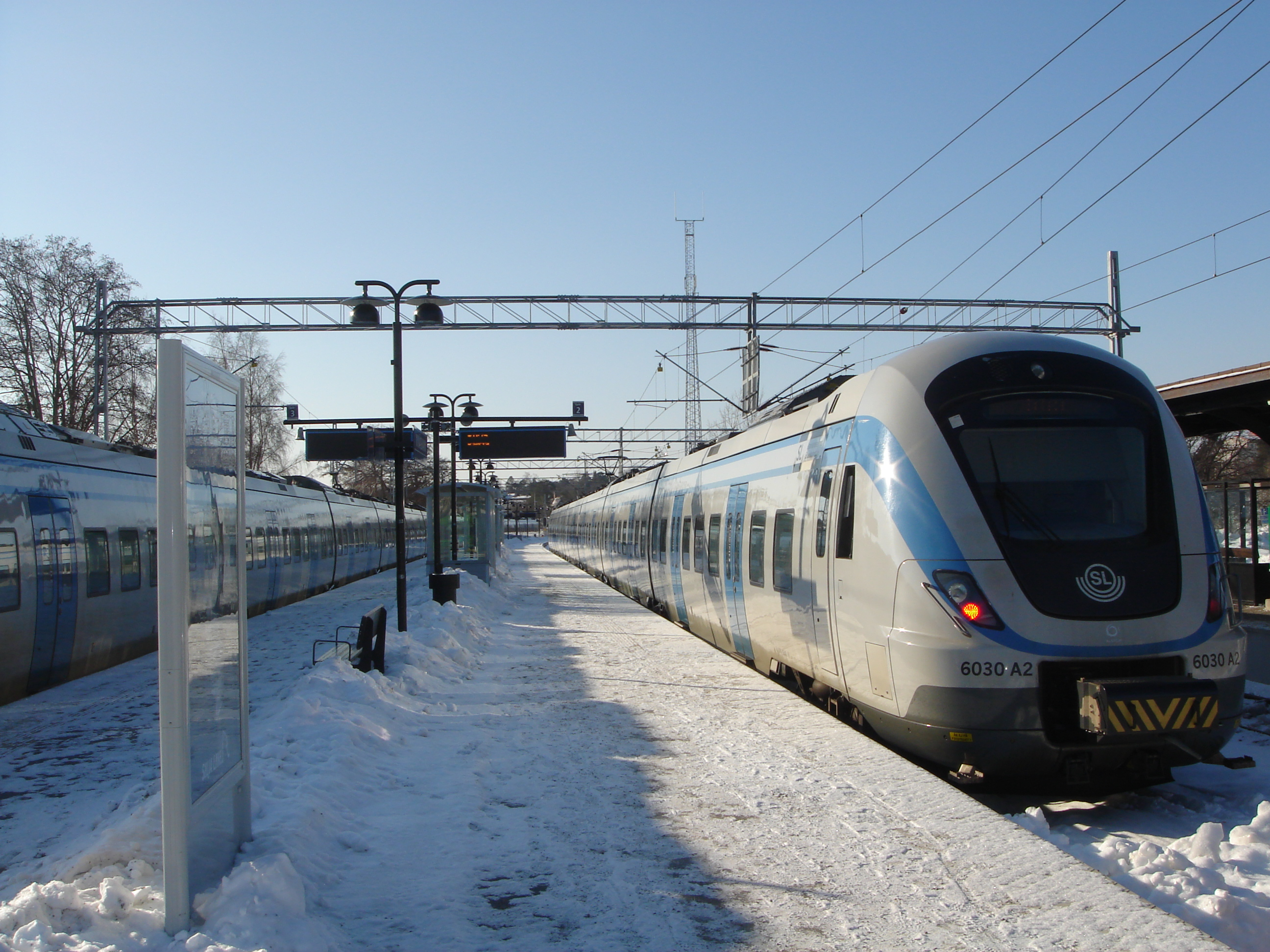
Platform in Winter

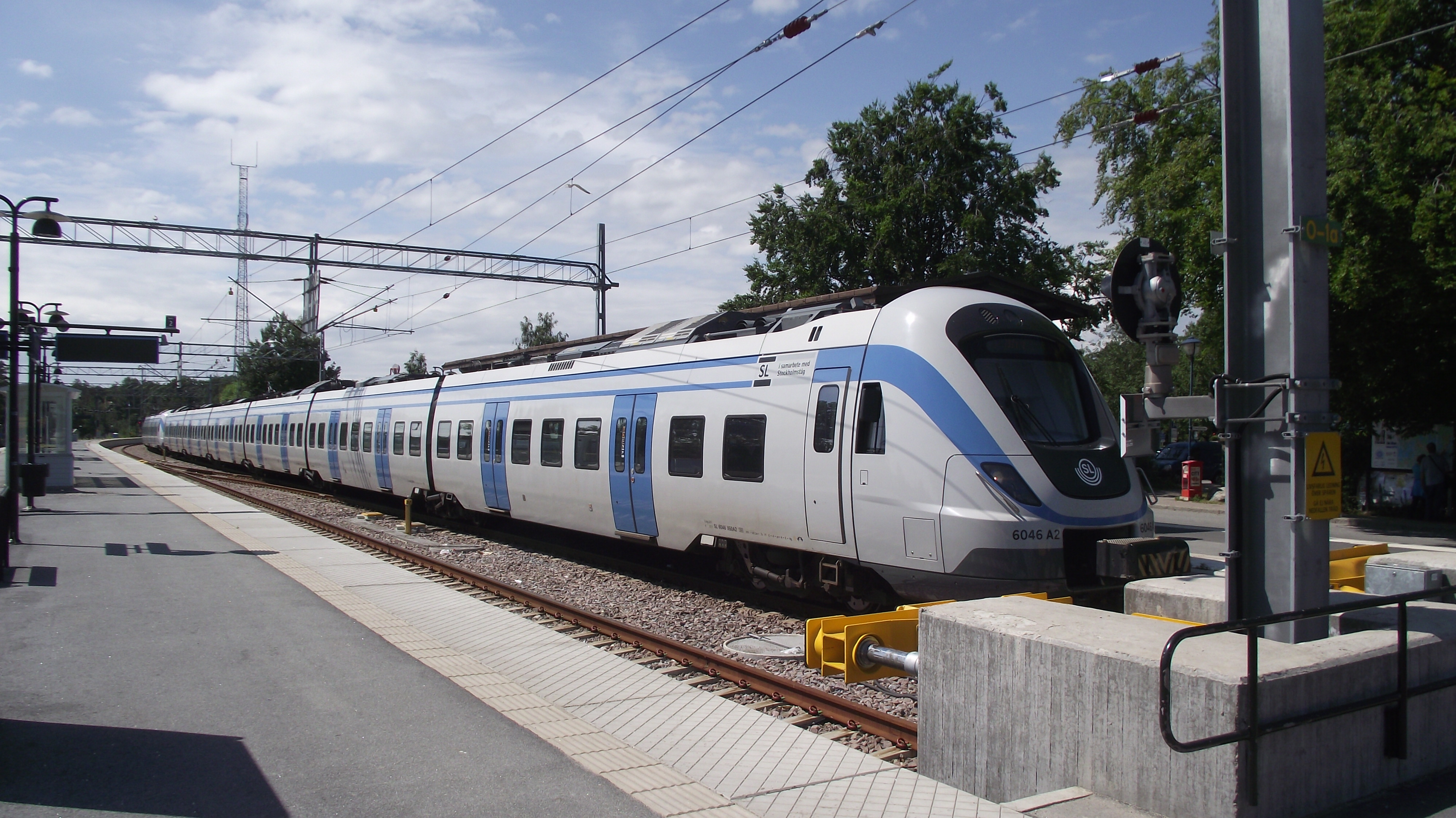
Platform in Summer

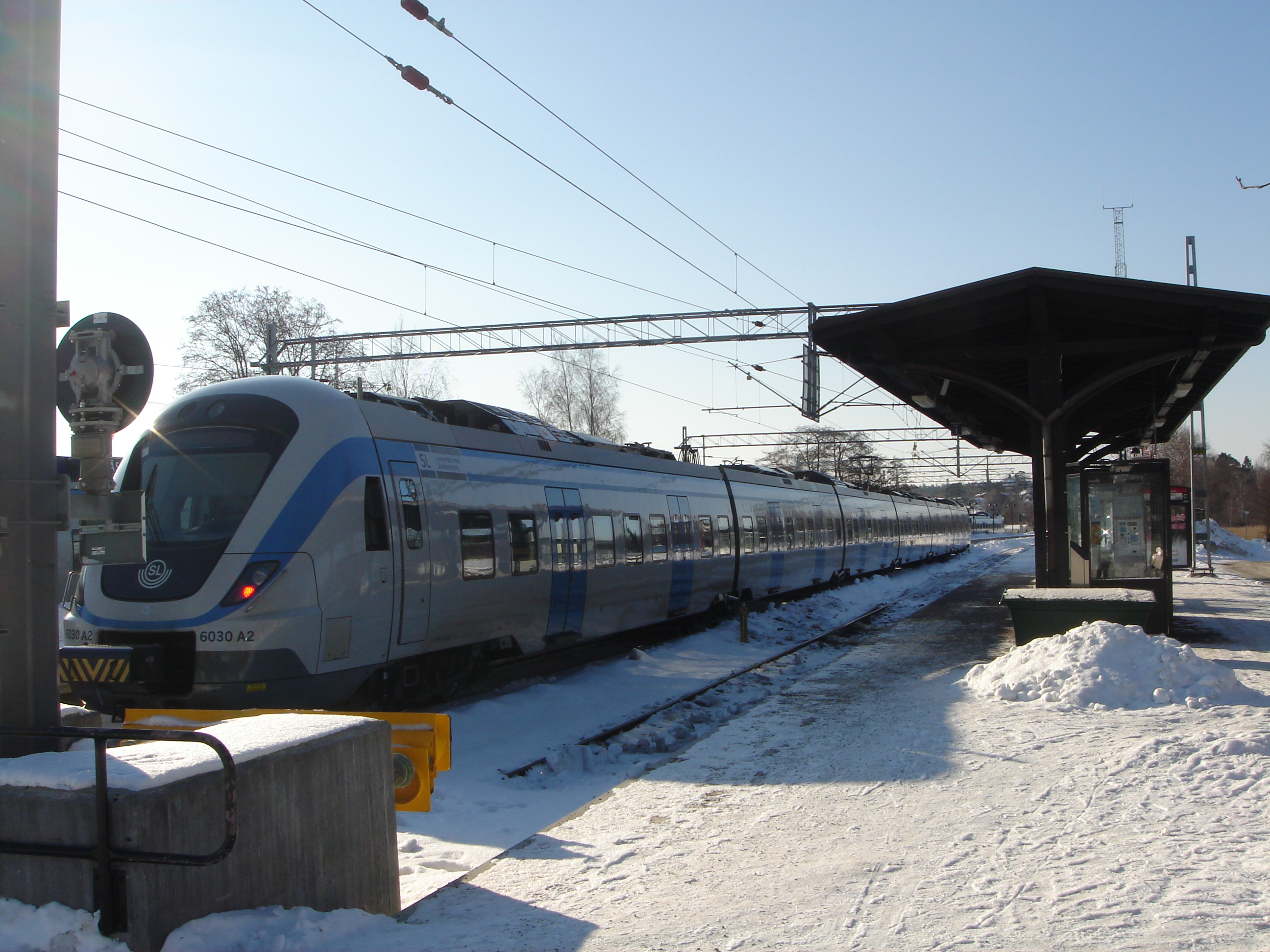
Platform in Winter
