= Nynäs Line =

Railway line between Älvsjö and Nynäshamn in Sweden

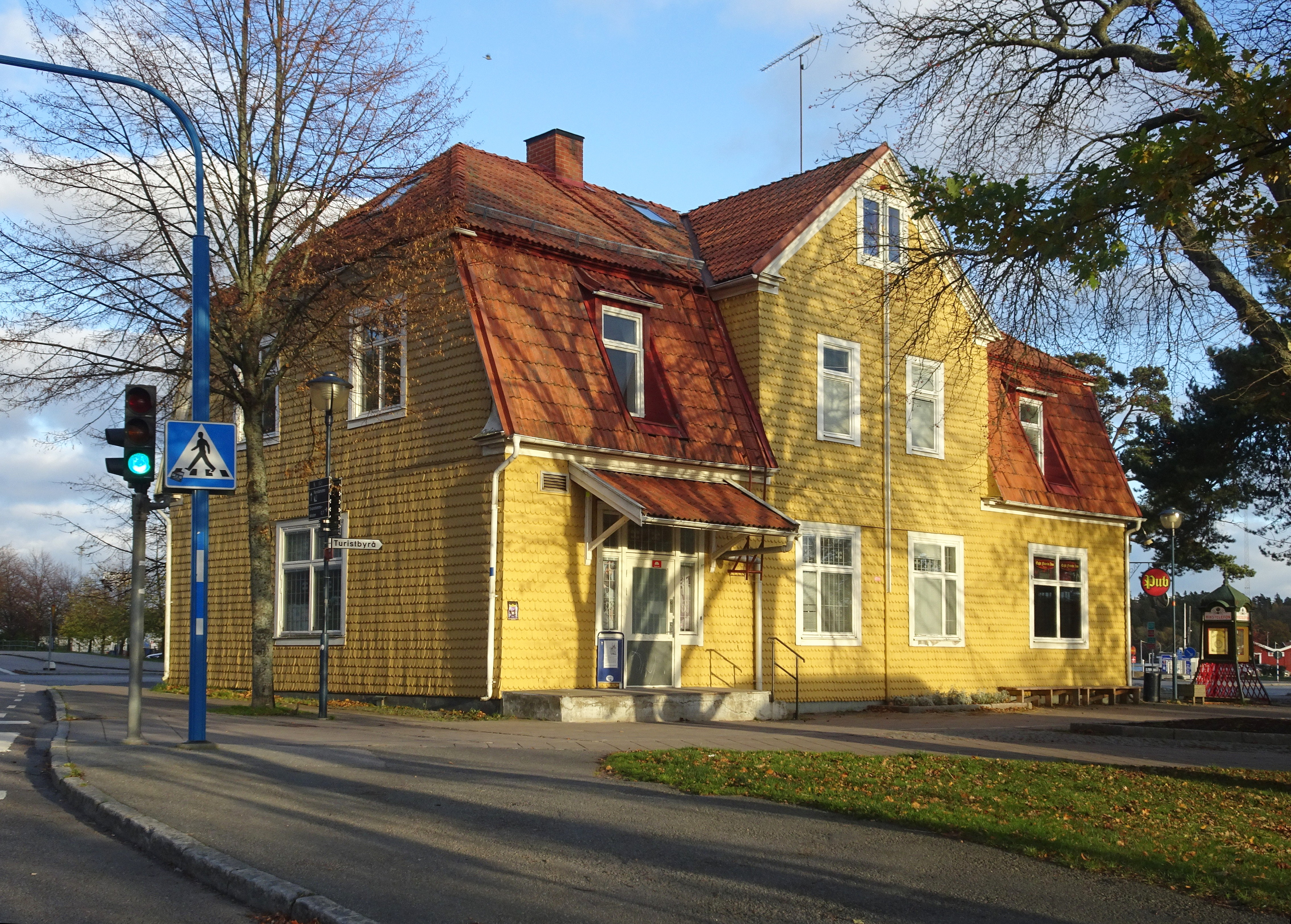
- Nynäshamn railway station is the southern terminus.

Overview
- Native name: Nynäsbanan
- Owner: Swedish Transport Administration
- Locale: Sweden
- Termini: Älvsjö railway tation; Nynäshamn railway station

Service
- System: Swedish Railway Network
- Operator(s): MTR Nordic/Storstockholms Lokaltrafik (passenger); Green Cargo (cargo)

History
- Opened: 28 December 1901

Technical
- Line length: 55 km (34 mi)
- Character: Commuter and freight
- Track gauge: 1,435 mm (4 ft 8 1/2 in) standard gauge
- Electrification: 15 kV 16.7 Hz AC

The Nynäs Line (Swedish: Nynäsbanan) is a 55-kilometer (34 mi) long railway line between Älvsjö and Nynäshamn in Sweden. The line is electrified and is double track on the 22-kilometer (14 mi) section from Älvsjö to Västerhaninge.

The line is used by the Stockholm commuter rail network and freight trains. At Älvsjö, it connects to the Western Main Line. At Farsta strand there is a connection to Farsta strand metro station, which is a terminus at the Stockholm underground railway. At Nynäshamn there is a transfer to the Destination Gotland ferries to the island of Gotland.

== History ==
Nynäshamn was established as a port during the 1860s, to allow ships to avoid the skerries surrounding Stockholm. Construction of Nynäsbanan was started by the private company Stockholm-Nynäs Järnvägs AB in 1898 and the line was opened on 28 December 1901. Initially, there was a change of trains at Älvsjö, but from 1909 onwards trains starting running directly to Stockholm Central Station. To being with, one of the major traffic generators was the ferry service to Gotland. In 1928, an oil refinery was opened and the line started transporting oil. Diesel multiple units were introduced in 1928 and in 1935, the line started using diesel-electric locomotives. Nynäsbanan was nationalised in 1957, although Stockholm-Nynäs Järnvägs AB continued to exist at least on paper until it was fully absorbed into the Swedish State Railways in 1968. The line was electrified in 1962, and in 1973 it became part of the Stockholm commuter rail network, when at the same time X1 electric multiple units were introduced. A modern automatic train control (ATC) signalling system was introduced on Nynäsbanan in 1980.

From 1993 until 1996, the line was upgraded, including double track from Älvsjö to Västerhaninge. This allowed a 15-minute headway on that section. Oil transport was terminated from Nynäsbanan in the 1990s. In 2007, the then-southern terminus located just beside Nynäshamn Ferry Terminal (sv) was closed to allow expansion of said ferry terminal and the terminus was shortened by 500m to Nynäshamn railway station. Between 2008 and 2016, all station platforms on the line were extended and passing loops were built at Hemfosa Station and Segersäng Station.

A new station called Vega, located in Haninge Municipality between Skogås and Handen stations, opened on 1 April 2019 after almost four years of construction. Vega was also the name of a small halt on the Nynäs Line which existed between 1929 and 1973, although it was built at a different location from the current Vega railway station.

In connection with the expansion of the Stockholm Norvik freight port, a siding was built from the Nynäs line towards the harbour, which was completed in April 2020.
