= Nynas =

Swedish naphthenic specialty products and bitumen manufacturer

Nynas AB
- Industry: Speciality chemicals
- Founded: 1928
- Headquarters: Stockholm, Sweden
- Key people: Eric Gosse, CEO
- Products: Bitumen; Naphthenic specialty products
- Revenue: approx. SEK 14.5 billion (2025)
- Owner: Davidson Kempner Capital Management, Independent Swedish foundation Nynässtiftelsen and PDVSA
- Number of employees: 592 (December 2025)
- Website: http://www.nynas.com

Nynas AB is a Swedish manufacturer of naphthenic specialty products and bitumen products, serving electrification and infrastructure. Founded in 1928 as a national oil company with a traditional range of products, the company today supplies specialist products and niche markets.

As of 2025, Nynas operated three production sites, 18 offices and 22 depots, serving customers in more than 80 countries with approximately 600 employees globally. It's net sales in 2025 was SEK 14.5 billion.

== Business activities ==
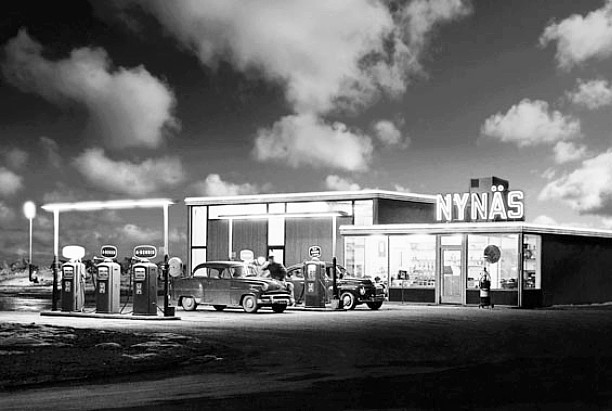
Archive photo of a Nynas petrol station in Sweden during the 1950s.

Until the 1970s Nynas was a traditional oil company, manufacturing and selling a large number of products, from petrol and diesel to heating oil and lubricants. Following the oil crises (1973 and 1979), activity now focuses on naphthenic specialty products and bitumen products.

Naphthenic specialty oils consist of three different kinds of products:

- Insulating fluids are used primarily to insulate and cool transformers.
- Process oils are included in products such as industrial rubber, explosives, car tyres, printing inks, nappies and other hygiene articles, and in thermoplastics for items such as tool handles.
- Base oils are suitable for liquids used in metal processing, hydraulic fluids and other industrial lubricants.

Bitumen products are available in various versions depending on which properties are required:

- Standard binding agents to hold together the stones in asphalt surfaces.
- Special binding agents for demanding applications such as noise-dampening asphalt and roads with high traffic intensity.
- Binding agents for surface treatment, for example emulsions for roads with little traffic.
- Binding agents for cold mix asphalt technology, which has lower energy consumption and is also used to recycle old asphalt surfaces.
- Binding agents for industrial use, primarily for roof coverings and to provide anti-corrosion protection for items such as pipes.

Nynas conducts extensive work on product development. This involves not least of all catalyst and hydrotreatment technology, which has resulted in, among other things, the launch of a new kind of transformer oil. Nynas also manufactures products that comply with the new environmental requirements that came into force in 2010, when the European Union bans aromatic oils in car tyres. In recent years, Nynas has launched transformer and tyre oils that are partly manufactured from bio-based feedstock and are thus renewable. This is an important stage in reducing dependence on fossil feedstock, thereby contributing towards sustainable development. The company also produuces an insulating fluid using 100% recycled transformer oils feedstock.

Efforts on the bitumen side have focused on products suitable for various conditions with regard to temperature, stone material and traffic loads. One example is the special bitumen found in noise-dampening asphalt, which results in the noise from traffic being almost halved. Nynas is also the leader in the field of water-based emulsions. These can be used in cold and semi-hot asphalt masses, which means both reduced energy consumption and lower hydrocarbon emissions. In 2022, Nynas launched a polymer-modified bitumen (PMB) that contains biogenic material, resulting in a significantly reduced climate impact.

Manufacturing takes place at a number of refineries in Europe. Two of these, at Gothenburg and Nynäshamn, are wholly owned by Nynas, while the refinery at Eastham is co-owned with Shell. Nynas has its own laboratories for quality control and product development. The company invests heavily in its manufacturing facilities, including a 213 MSEK investment approved in 2025 to increase vacuum distillation capacity at the Nynäshamn site.

== History ==
The name primarily associated with the original Nynas is Axel Ax:son Johnson. At an early stage he recognised the opportunities created by car ownership, and in 1928 he had Sweden's first refinery built in Nynäshamn. During World War II, Nynas played a prominent role in supplying energy in Sweden, as the company developed methods for manufacturing oil products made of coal and tar.

The decades immediately after the Second World War were characterised by rapid expansion, and in 1956 the refinery in Gothenburg was opened. At that time Nynas was a Swedish family firm, manufacturing a large number of oil products and also with a national network of petrol stations.

But changes in the outside world soon made it economically unviable to run a small, national oil company. The two energy crises in the 1970s resulted in Nynas suffering a serious cost crisis, as they did not have access to their own crude oil. The only way out was to specialise in a small number of products and to look beyond the borders of Sweden.

In order to grow on the bitumen side, the refinery in Antwerp was bought in 1985, and in 1992 the UK bitumen company Briggs Oil was acquired. The latter acquisition included the refineries in Dundee and Eastham. In parallel with this expansion in the bitumen area, hundreds of million Swedish kronor were invested in turning the Nynäshamn refinery into a modern facility for the production of naphthenic specialty oils.

In September 2013, Nynas received EU approval to take over the Harburg base oil manufacturing plant and some associated refining facilities of the Harburg refinery in Hamburg, Germany. However, the plant was closed down in 2022.

2017 saw the start of a period that resulted in significant financial problems because of an increasingly stressed political and economic situation in Venezuela. Initially this caused disruption to crude oil deliveries, which gradually stopped completely because the USA introduced far-reaching sanctions against Venezuela. During a transitional period, it was still possible to run the business thanks to the exemption – General Licence – that Nynas was a granted by the US Office of Foreign Assets Control (OFAC). This exemption meant that other companies were permitted to continue trading with Nynas without being in breach of the USA’s sanctions. But the situation became economically unsustainable, and in December 2019 Nynas was granted an application for a company reconstruction at a Swedish court in order to investigate the possibilities of continuing to run the business, either partly or in full.

In May 2020, the OFAC announced that Nynas was no longer blocked under the sanctions because of changes in the company’s ownership structure. This meant that American individuals and companies no longer required a permit from the OFAC for transactions or activities that involved Nynas.

The company reconstruction involved changes to Nynas’ ownership structure. The biggest owner is now the US asset management company Davidson Kempner Capital Management, with 49.9% of the shares. The other co-owners are an independent Swedish foundation Nynässtiftelsen (approx. 35%) and PDVSA (approx. 14,9 %).

With the new ownership structure in place, the strategic guidelines were also modified as a consequence of the changed conditions in the external environment. The strategic approach sees operations focusing on Europe, as an element of the objective to strengthen competitiveness in Nynas’ core markets. Despite a stated European focus, sales of naphthenic specialty oils will continue to take place to selected customers in regions including India, the Middle East, South Africa and Turkey. As for bitumen activities, these were centralised to the markets in the Nordic region, the Baltic region and the UK.

=== Timeline ===
- 1928 The refinery in Nynäshamn is built.
- 1950s Nynas builds up a national network of petrol stations.
- 1981 The petrol stations are sold to Shell.
- 1986 Nynas buys a refinery in Antwerp, Belgium.
- 1992 UK company Briggs Oil is acquired.
- 2001 The refinery in Nynäshamn undergoes an extensive modernisation process.
- 2004-2006 Partnership agreements are concluded with US oil companies Valero and Lyondell
- 2007 The Nova Grades product range is launched
- 2008: A new bitumen laboratory is built in Antwerp.
- 2010-2011: A new hydrogen plant is built in Nynäshamn. In summer 2011 the plant starts to run on natural gas instead of naphtha, cutting carbon dioxide emissions by 20,000 tonnes per year.
- 2012: A new sulphur treatment plant is opened at the refinery in Nynäshamn at a cost of SEK 600 million, cutting emissions from sulphur recovery to one fifth.
- 2013: Nynas receives approval from the European Commission to take over production and responsibility for the base oil plant and associated production units at the Harburg refinery in Hamburg, Germany.
- 2014-2016: Extensive investments to convert Harburg from a fuel refinery into a refinery for specialty oils, resulting in a 30 per cent increase in capacity for naphthenic specialty oils.
- 2017: Financial problems because of an increasingly stressed political and economic situation in Venezuela, resulting in disruption to feedstock supplies.
- 2019: Nynas introduces a bio-based high-performance transformer fluid, NYTRO® BIO 300X.
- 2020: US sanctions are removed because of the new ownership structure and ongoing reconstruction of the company.
- 2021: US asset management company Davidson Kempner Capital Management becomes the biggest shareholder.
- 2022 New strategic guidelines with a focus on the European market for increased competitiveness.

== Sources ==
- Nationalencyklopedin
- Annual Report 2007 download
- Annual Report 2008
- Annual Report 2011 PDF
- Annual Report 2013 PDF
- The book "75 years old – looking back"
- Brochure: "Taking Oil Further" download
- Brochure: "Nynas in society"
- Brochure: "Welcome to a specialist oil company" download
- Advantage Environment: "Oil from Sweden is better for the environment"
- Lube Report: "Nynas Beefs Up as Citgo Bows Out of Pale Oils"
- Lube report: "Nynas Ups Pale Oil Output"
- Nynas Annual Report 2018
- US Department of the Treasury
- Ackordcentralen
- Nynas Annual report 2020
- Nynas Annual report 2021
- New shareholder in Nynas [www.nynas.com/en/media/newslist/new-shareholder-in-nynas/]
- Bitumen Matters: Nynas breaking new ground for lower carbon roads
- Core European naphthenics markets in focus
- Nynas Annual report 2024
