= Nynäshamn =

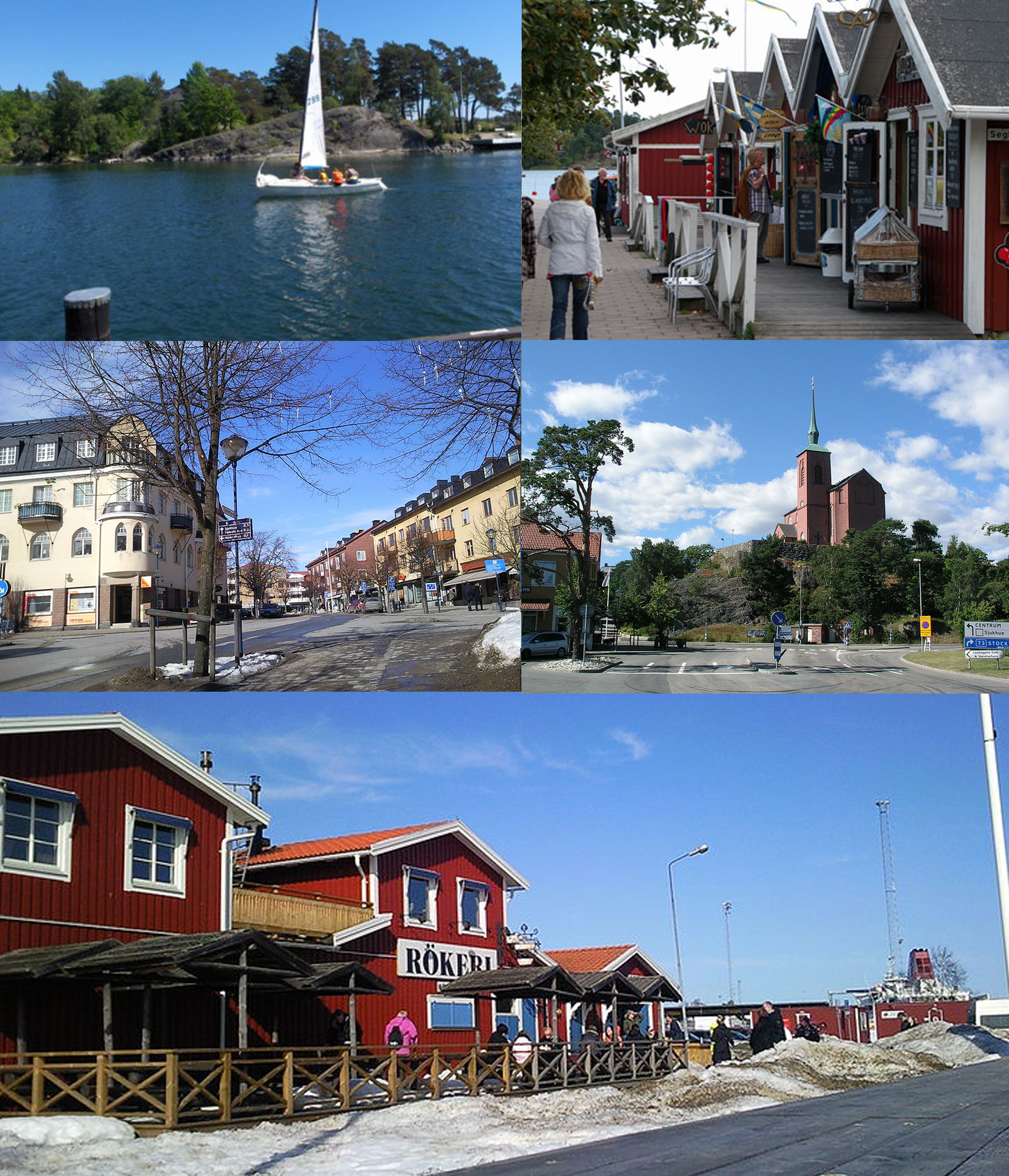
- Nynäshamn

- Flag Coat of arms

- Location within Stockholm Location within Sweden Location within European Union
- Coordinates: 58°54′N 17°57′E
- Country: Sweden
- Province: Södermanland
- County: Stockholm County
- Municipality: Nynäshamn Municipality

Area
  - Total: 6.68 km^{2} (2.58 sq mi)

Population (31 December 2023)
  - Total: 16 447
  - Density: 2.4/km^{2} (6.2/sq mi)
- Time zone: UTC+1 (CET)
  - Summer (DST): UTC+2 (CEST)

Nynäshamn is a locality and the seat of Nynäshamn Municipality, Stockholm County, Sweden with 16 447 inhabitants in 2023.

While interest in the area as a potentially useful port grew from the mid-19th century, it was only with the opening of the railway station to Stockholm in 1901 that Nynäshamn started to develop.

During the early 20th Century, Nynäshamn also became well known as a spa town, though most such facilities were closed down before the end of World War I. Main industries arrived through Telegrafverkets verkstäder (the factories of the Government owned telephone company) in 1916 and an oil refinery built in 1928–29 by Axel Ax:son Johnson & Co. The latter still remains though under different ownership and under the name Nynas.

Nynäshamn was the venue of the Olympic sailing regatta in 1912.

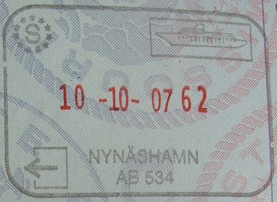
Passport stamp issued to ferry passengers to Gdańsk before Poland joined the Schengen Area

Nynäshamn, which lies about 60 km (37 mi) south of Stockholm, is well known for being one of the places on the Swedish mainland from where ferries to the island Gotland depart. This is a hugely popular destination for Swedes of all ages in the summer months. The Polferries terminal also offer regular routes to Gdańsk in Poland. Several cruise ships on tours in the Baltic Sea also stay in the harbour, because they are too large to go into Stockholm.

A harbour party is hosted each summer, as well as local craft fairs. During these events a steam train often runs routes to and from Stockholm. During the summer months, the harbour is packed with boats of all sizes, and bustles with both visitors and locals. There are a number of eateries and boutiques with locally made produce. The main town is mainly modern and the buildings uninteresting generally. A library and one screen cinema is centrally located, and a limited number of shops catering to mainly to local trade.

Many people in Nynäshamn live in apartment blocks, situated in estates, although they are not more than 10 stories high. There are also multiple villas scattered throughout the town, as well as terraced houses. With he surrounding nature and sea, as well as the low crime rates, Nynäshamn is relaxed, in contrast to the bustle of Stockholm.

Nynäshamn is served by Stockholm commuter rail (Pendeltåg) and several bus routes.

Popular singer Meja, and ice hockey player Kent Nilsson were born in Nynäshamn.

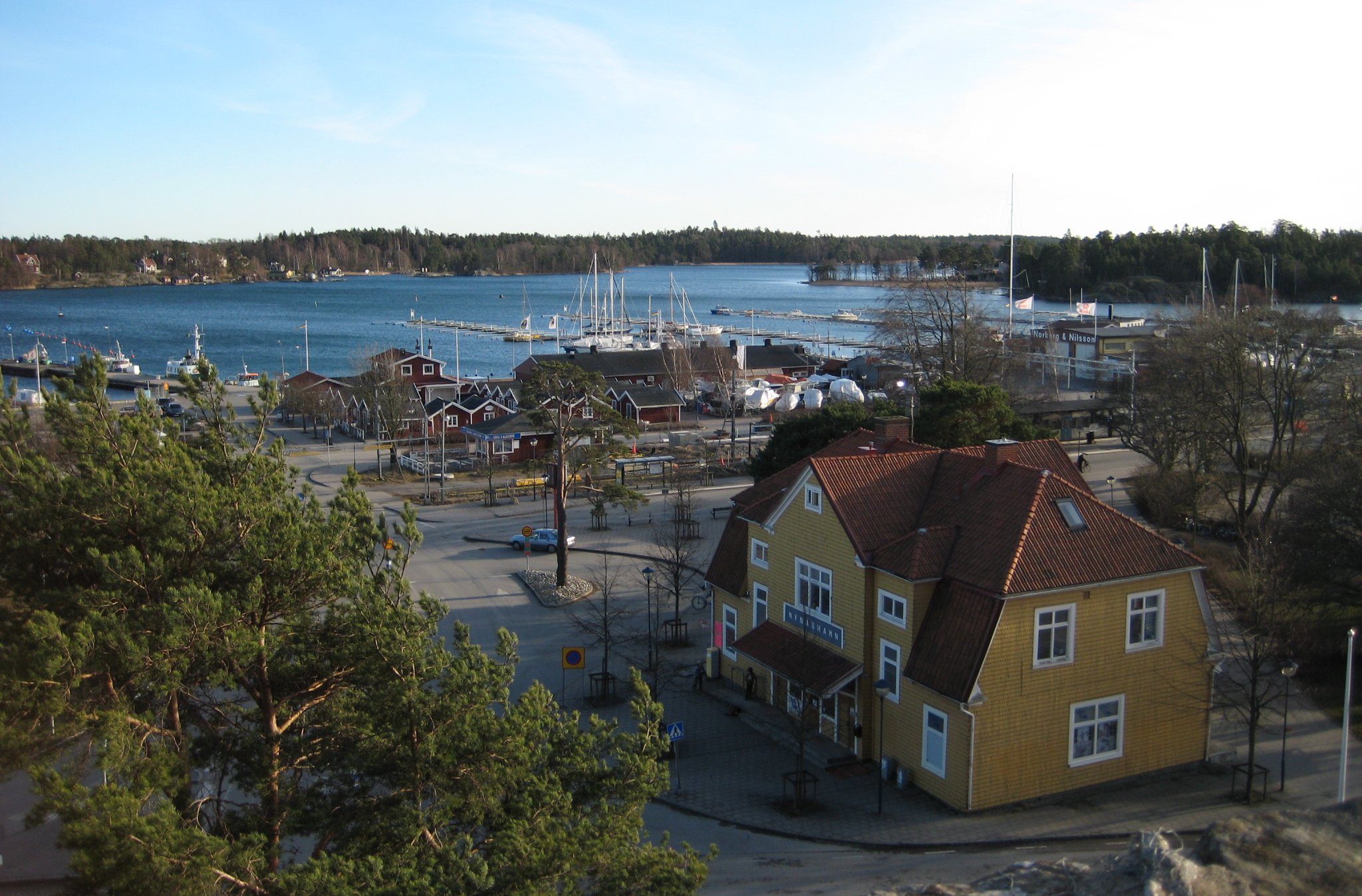
Railway station and harbour, seen from the Nynäshamn church

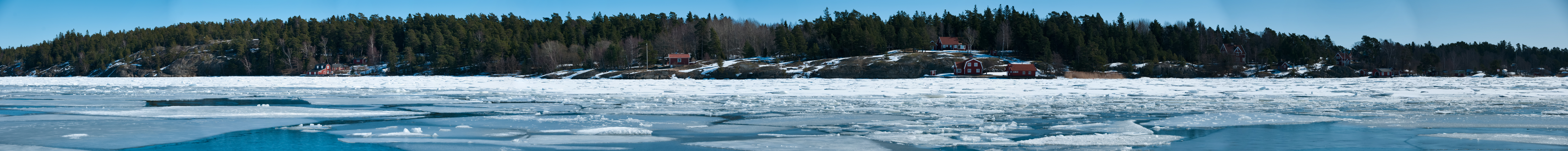
Panoramic view from Nynäshamn harbour, March 2011.

== Notable locations ==
- Drottningviken

== Twin towns and sister cities ==
- Liepāja, Latvia
