= World Architecture Festival =

Annual festival and awards ceremony for architecture

- Nickname: WAF
- Status: Active
- Genre: Festival; Conference
- Begins: November 12, 2025
- Ends: November 14, 2025
- Frequency: Annually
- Venue: Miami Beach Convention Center
- Years active: 18
- Established: October 22, 2008
- Founders: Paul Finch; Jeremy Melvin
- Major events: World Building of the Year awards programme
- Sponsor: Grohe
- Website: worldarchitecturefestival.com

The World Architecture Festival (WAF) is an architectural and design event held annually and considered to be one of the most prestigious events dedicated to the architecture and development industries. It was founded by Paul Finch and Jeremy Melvin for the purpose of showcasing and exhibiting architectural projects and is the world's largest annual architectural event. It is the only architecture festival that combines a live–judged awards programme, where shortlisted architects present their projects live in crit rooms to a judging panel, with seminars and networking events. One of these projects is then awarded the 'World Building of the Year' title.

== History ==
The World Architecture Festival was first held in 2008 as a "festival and live awards competition dedicated to celebrating and sharing architectural excellence from across the globe". The first four events were held in Barcelona, from 2008 to 2011, at which point the festival moved to Singapore for four years. Since 2016, host cities have included Berlin and Amsterdam.

== Awards Programme ==
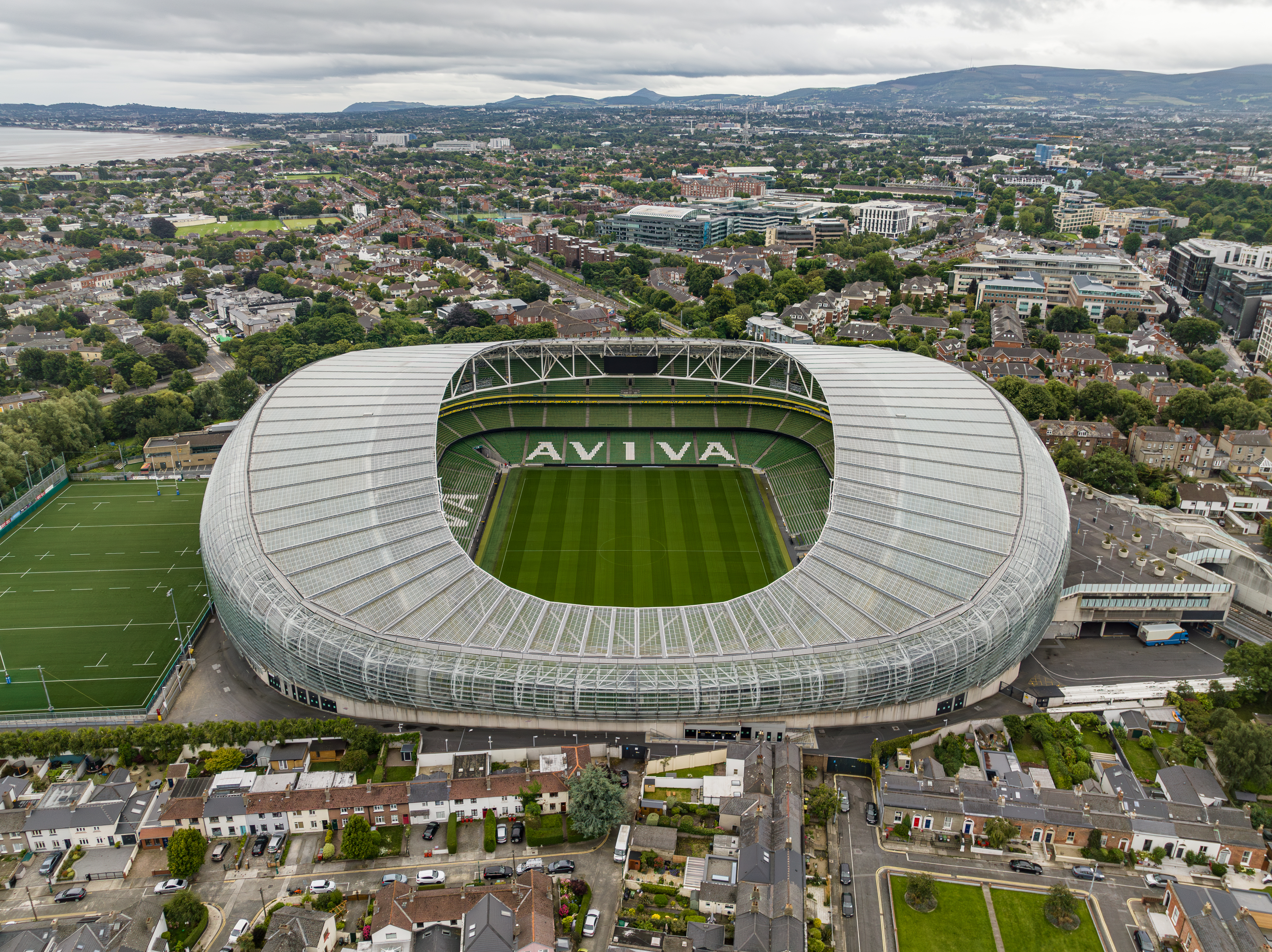
2010 Award winner: ONCE Foundation Award for Accessibility (Two joint winners) Category: Sport. Aviva Stadium, Ireland, Dublin by Populous in association with Scott Tallon Walker

Over a thousand projects are entered in the competition for the awards each year and more than 550 of these are shortlisted for live presentation at the festival. The architects pay a submission fee to enter a Future Project or a Completed Building project and travel to where the festival is arranged to present the shortlisted project live to a jury panel. The entries are voluntary and the festival does not control who submits projects. In 2011, the sister event INSIDE Festival (for interior architecture and design) was added in the same venue and arranged at the same time as WAF.

WAF maintains the World Buildings Directory as an official listing of all past and present projects entries to festivals.

=== Award Categories ===
Entries can be submitted to the following award categories – Completed Building, Future Project, Landscape or Inside.

- COMPLETED
  - Completed Buildings - Civic and Community
  - Completed Buildings - Creative Re-use
  - Completed Buildings - Culture
  - Completed Buildings - Display
  - Completed Buildings - Health
  - Completed Buildings - Higher Education and Research
  - Completed Buildings - Hotel and Leisure
  - Completed Buildings - House and Villa
  - Completed Buildings - Housing
  - Completed Buildings - Mixed-Use
  - Completed Buildings - Retrofit
  - Completed Buildings - Office
  - Completed Buildings - Production, Energy and Logistics
  - Completed Buildings - Religion
  - Completed Buildings - School
  - Completed Buildings - Shopping
  - Completed Buildings - Sport
  - Completed Buildings - Transport
- FUTURE
  - Future Projects - Civic
  - Future Projects - Commercial Mixed-Use
  - Future Projects - Competition Entries
  - Future Projects - Culture
  - Future Projects - Education
  - Future Projects - Experimental
  - Future Projects - Health
  - Future Projects - House
  - Future Projects - Infrastructure
  - Future Projects - Leisure-led Development
  - Future Projects - Masterplanning
  - Future Projects - Office
  - Future Projects - Residential
- LANDSCAPE
- INSIDE (Interiors Category)
  - Inside - Bars and Restaurants
  - Inside - Education
  - Inside - Health and Fitness
  - Inside - Hotels
  - Inside - Public Buildings
  - Inside - Residential (housing, more than one dwelling)
  - Inside - Residential (single dwelling)
  - Inside - Retail
  - Inside - Temporary/Meanwhile uses
  - Inside - Workplace (Large)
  - Inside - Workplace (Small)
- SPECIAL PRIZES
  - Best Use of Natural Light
  - Best Use of Stone
  - Sustainability Prize
  - Best Use of Colour
  - Best Use of Timber
  - Small Project of the Year
- ADDITIONAL PRIZES
  - The GROHE Water Prize
  - Student Charette

=== Award winners ===
Each year the World Architecture Festival publishes a list of the winners of the awards on their official website.

== Annual Festivals ==
WAF organises an annual architectural and design event for architects, designers and suppliers to gather together and celebrate, learn and discover. It provides an opportunity for architects to present their projects and ideas, highlighting innovative design solutions, sustainable practices, and cultural diversity in architecture. The festival aims to promote architectural innovation, recognize outstanding projects, and stimulate meaningful and impactful conversations about the future and processes of the built environments.

=== The 2008 festival ===
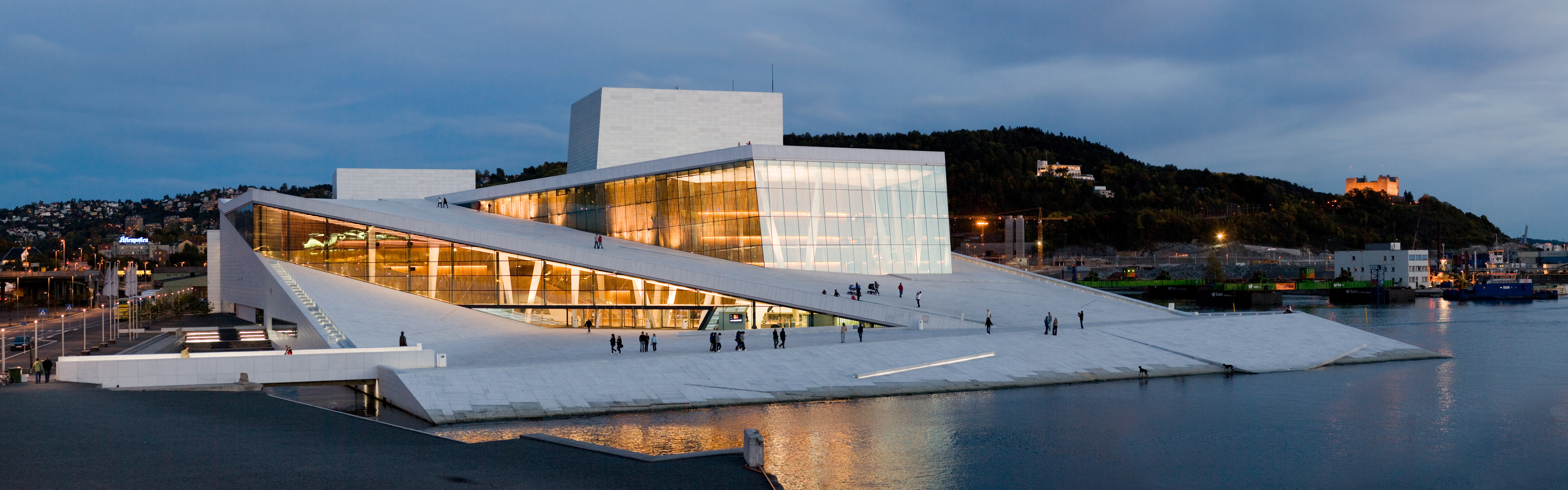
2008 Culture of the Year: Oslo Opera House, Norway, by Snøhetta

The World Architecture Festival was held for the first time on 22–24 October 2008 in Barcelona. Its programme director was Paul Finch. An important part of the festival was the awards programme. The competition was open to building completed within the past 18 months, between January 1, 2007 and June 20, 2008. There were 722 entries competing in 17 categories, comprising 96 building types from 63 countries. After a preselection, 224 projects from 43 countries have been shortlisted. All the shortlisted architects presented their work during the festival and the winners competed for the top award, the World Building of the Year. The judging panel was headed by Norman Foster and included Stefan Behnisch, Robert Stern and Zaha Hadid among the 40 architects on the panel. 1,900 visitors from 70 countries attended the festival.

In 2008, the World Building of the Year was awarded to: Bocconi University, Italy (by Grafton Architects).

Gallery of some of the 2008 winners

New building with the Aula Magna In the background: 2008 'Building of the Year, Learning: Universita Luigi Bocconi, Italy, by Grafton Architects

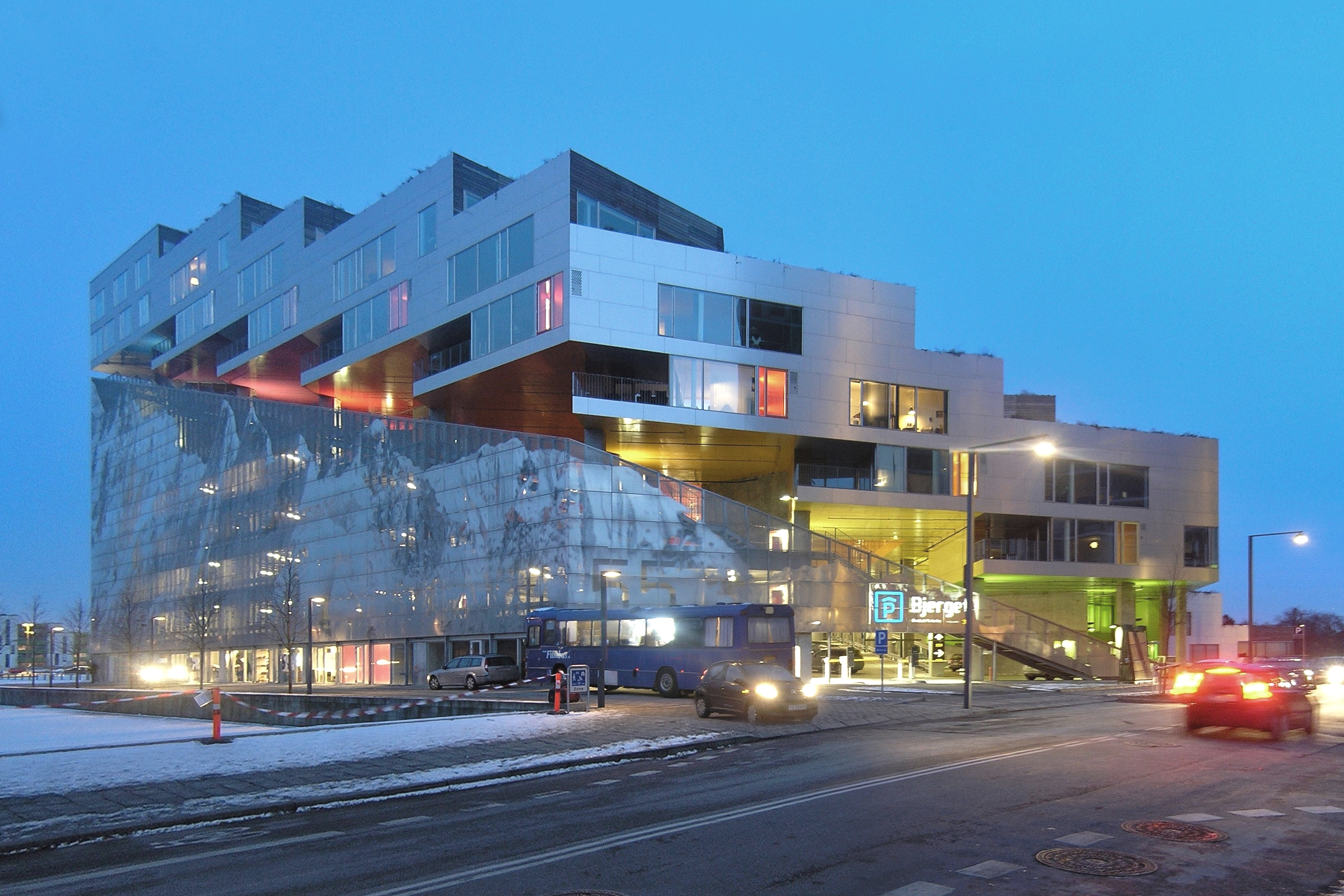
2008 Housing of the Year: Mountain Dwellings, Denmark by Bjarke Ingels Group

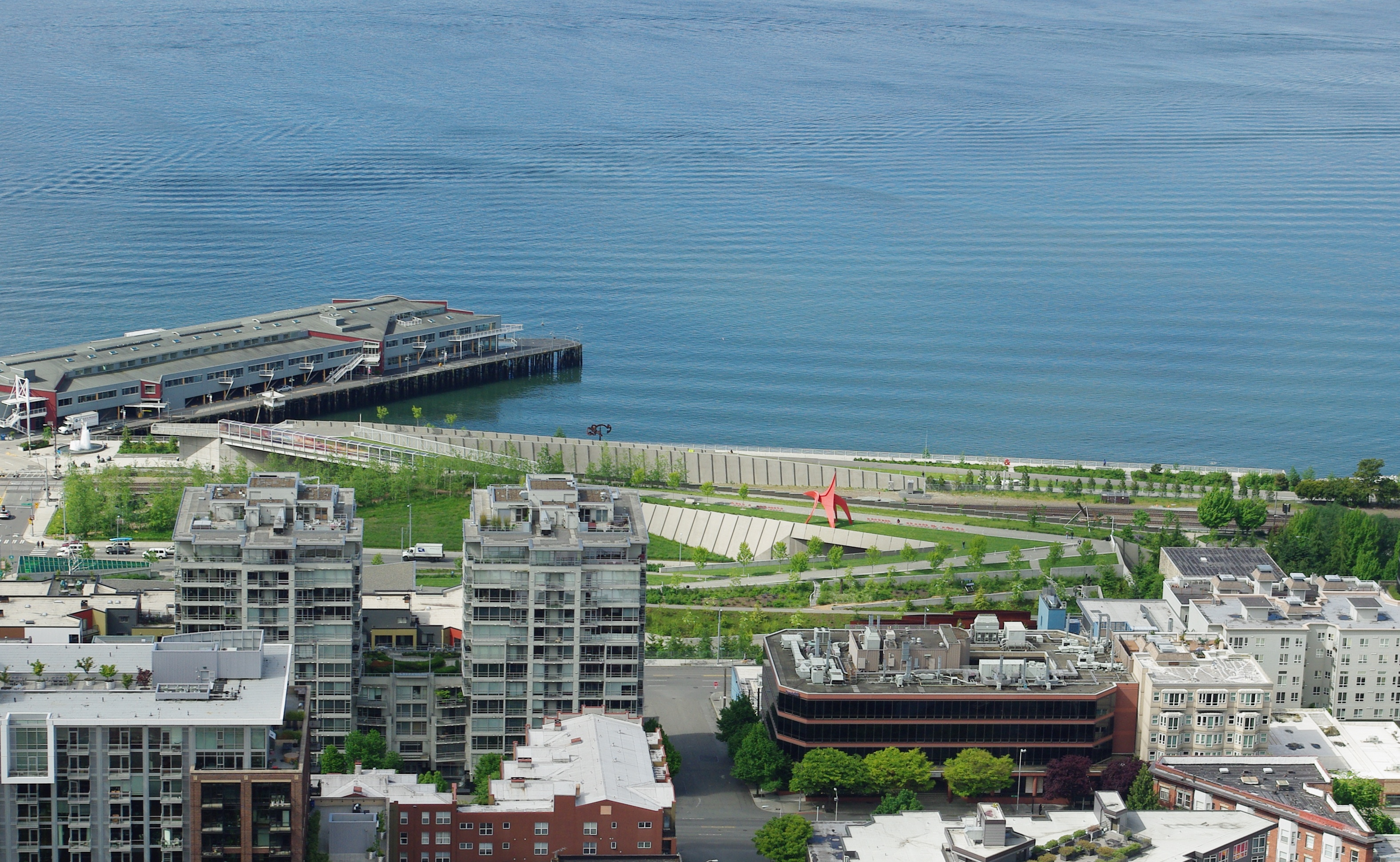
2008 Nature of the Year: Olympic Sculpture Park, Seattle Art Museum, USA, by Weiss/Manfredi Architecture/Landscape/Urbanism

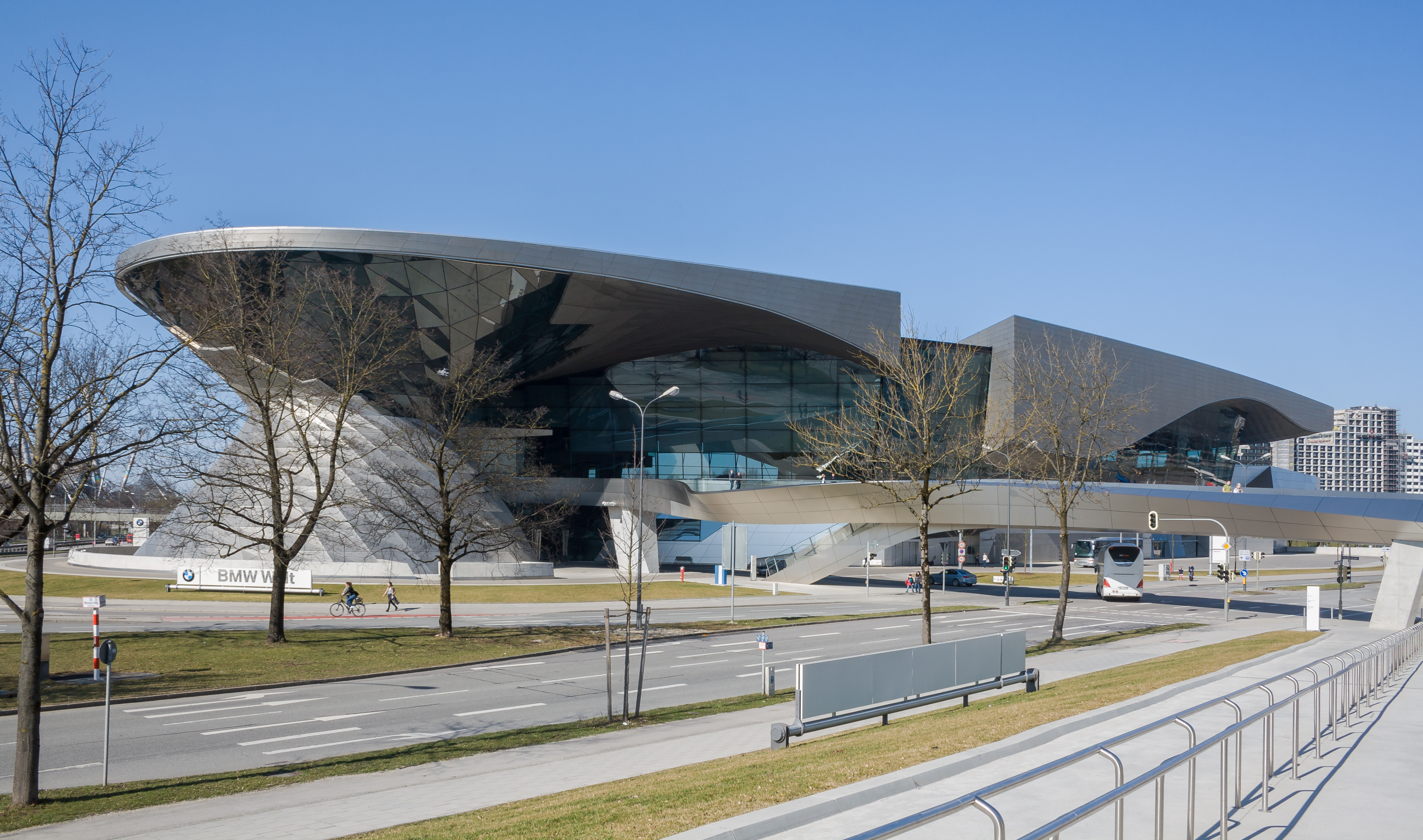
2008 Production of the Year: BMW Welt, Germany by Coop Himmelb(l)au

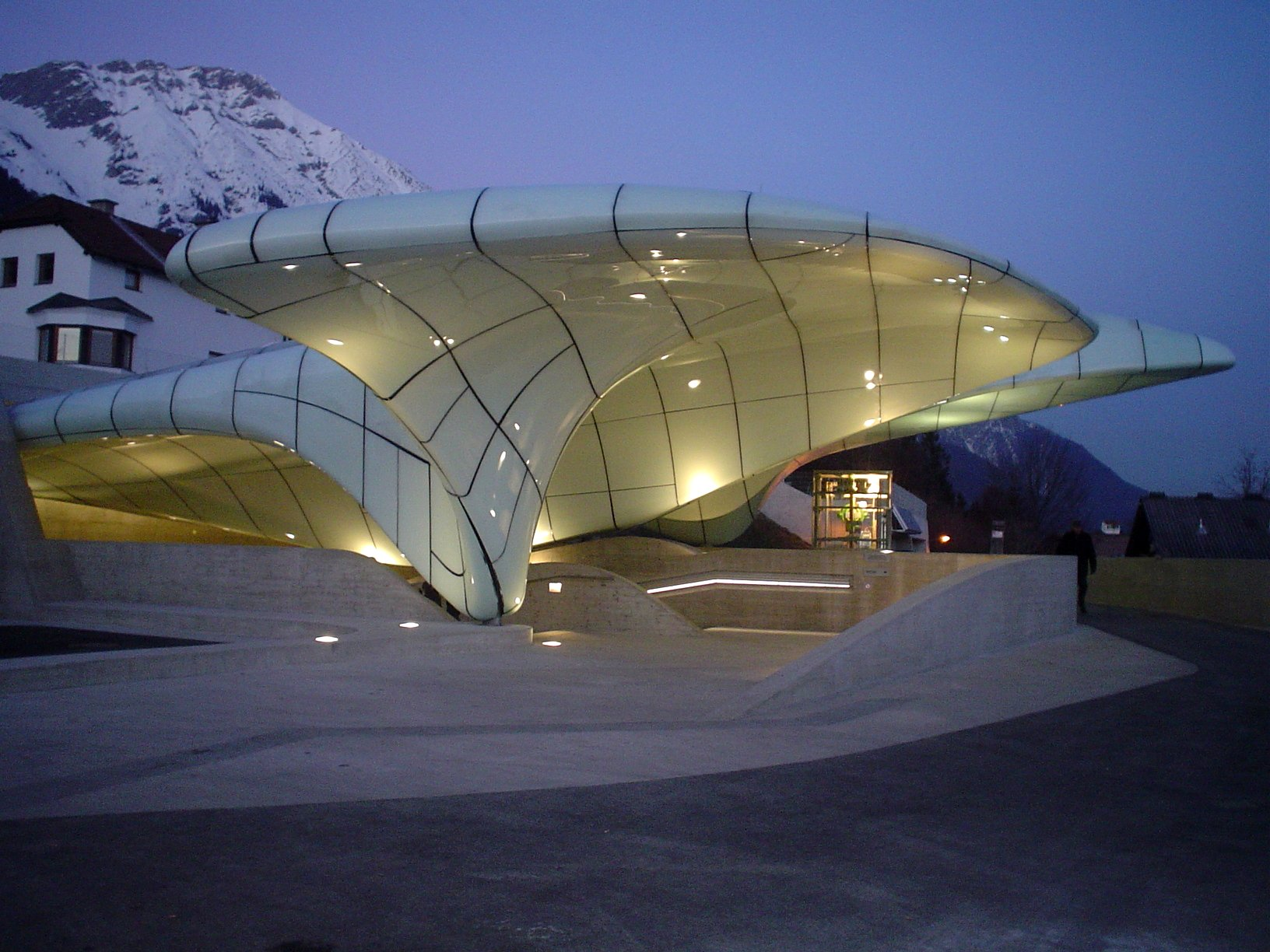
2008 Transport of the Year: Nordpark Cable Railway Stations, Austria by Zaha Hadid Architects

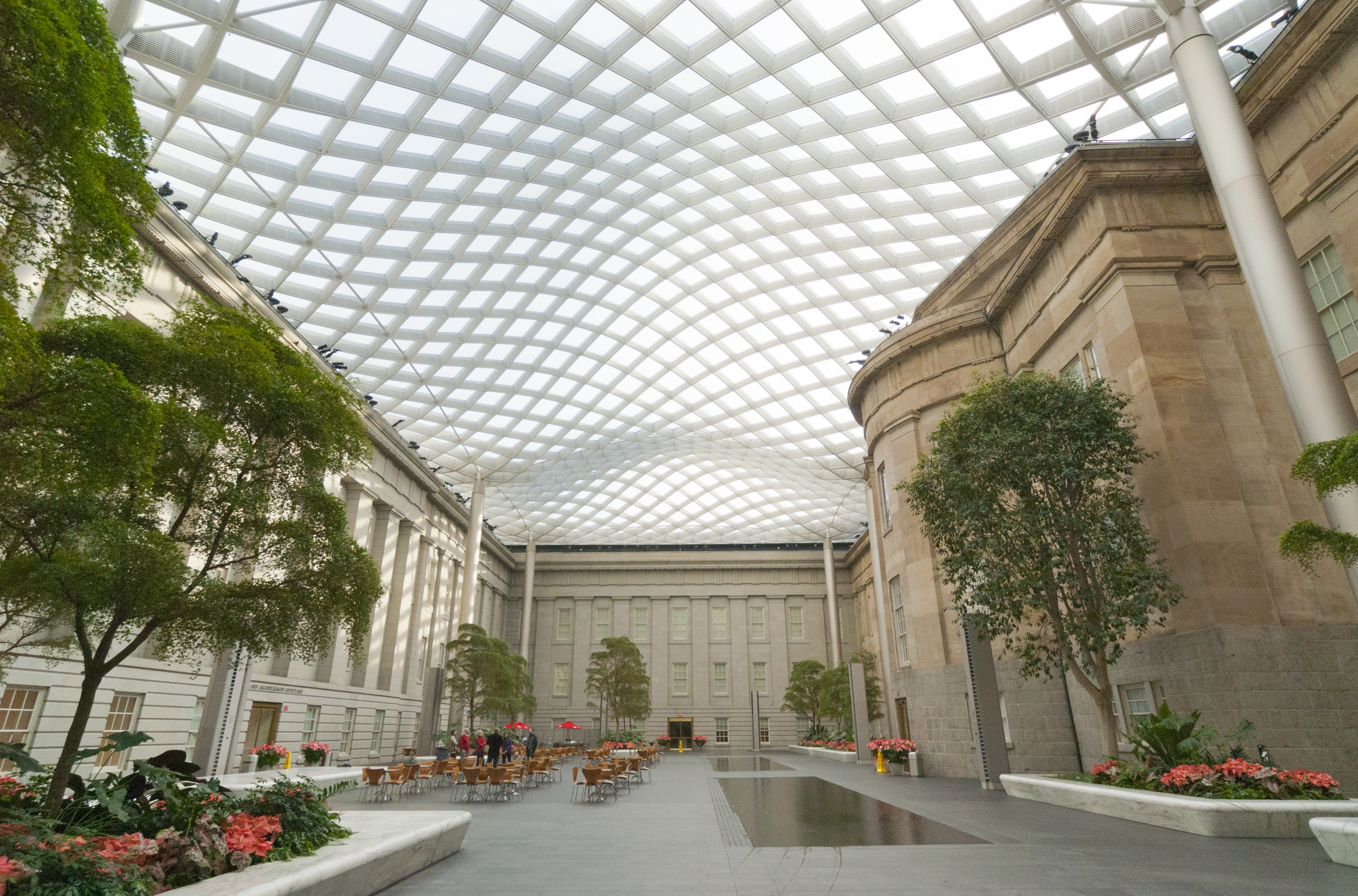
2008 Award winner, New & Old: Robert and Arlene Kogod Courtyard, Smithsonian Institution, United States, Washington D.C. by Foster + Partners

2008 Award winner, Shopping: K:fem, Sweden, Stockholm by Wingårdh Arkitektkontor AB

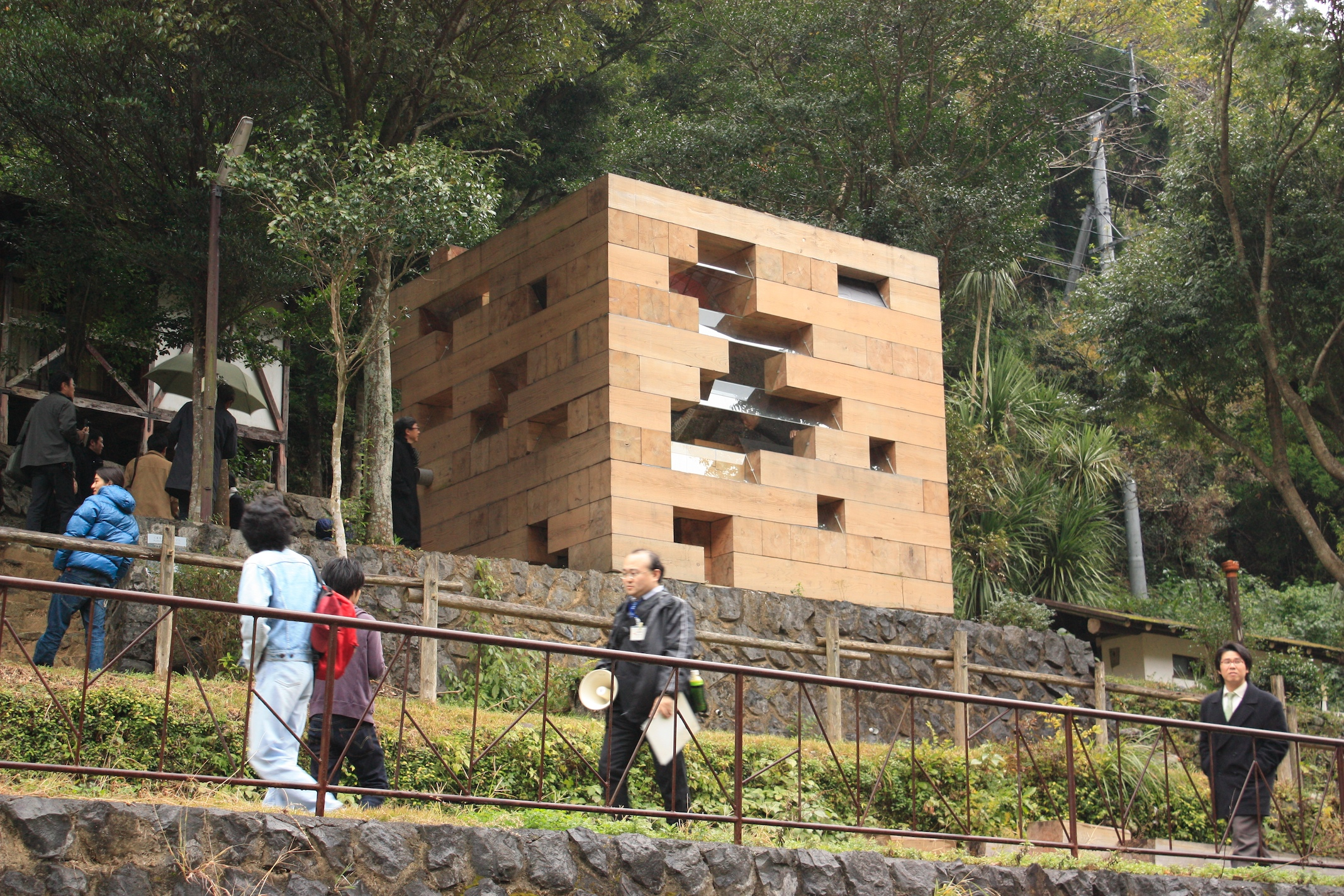
2008 Award winner, Private House: Final Wooden House, Japan by Sou Fujimoto Architects

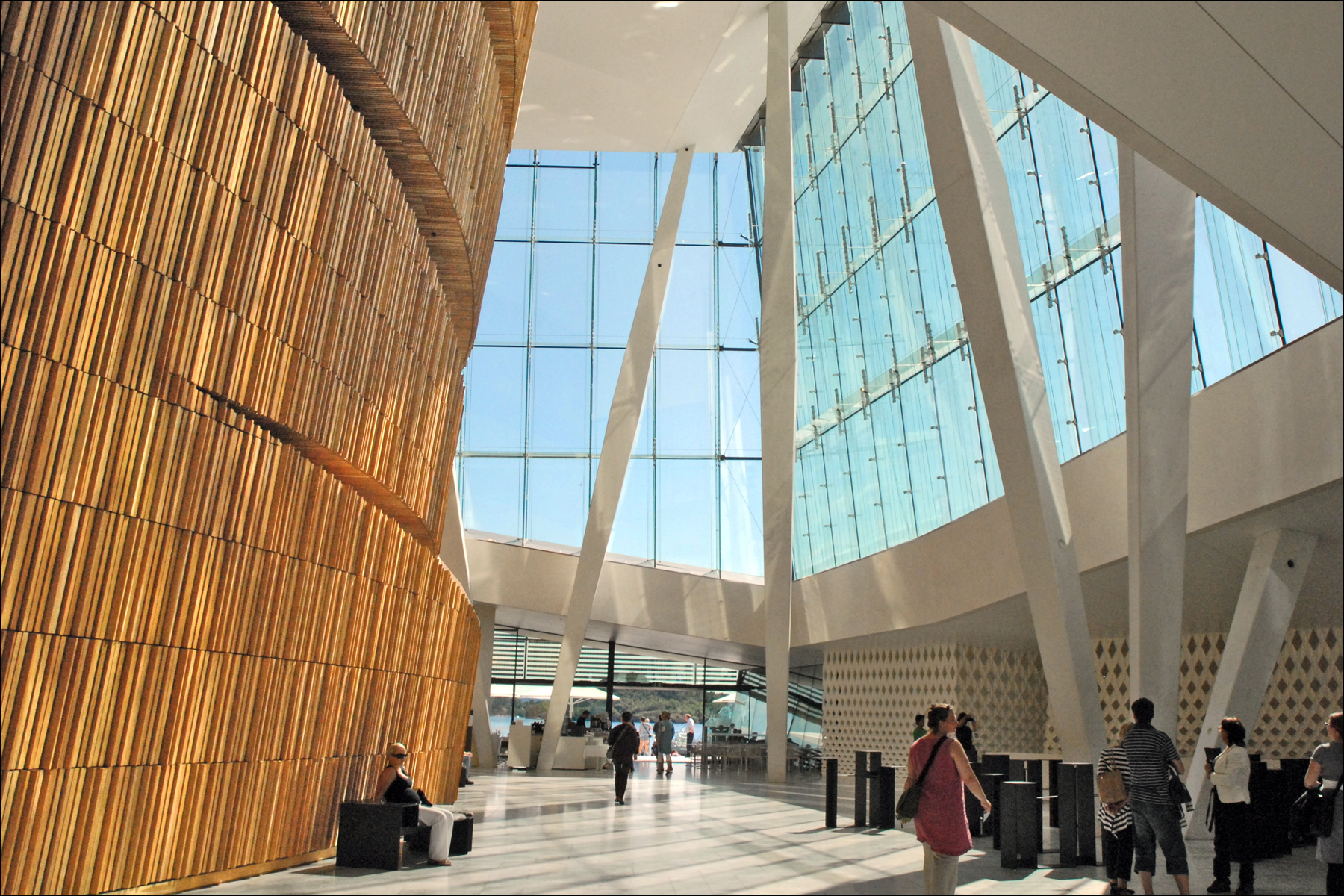
2008 Award winner, Culture: Oslo Opera House, Norway, by Snøhetta

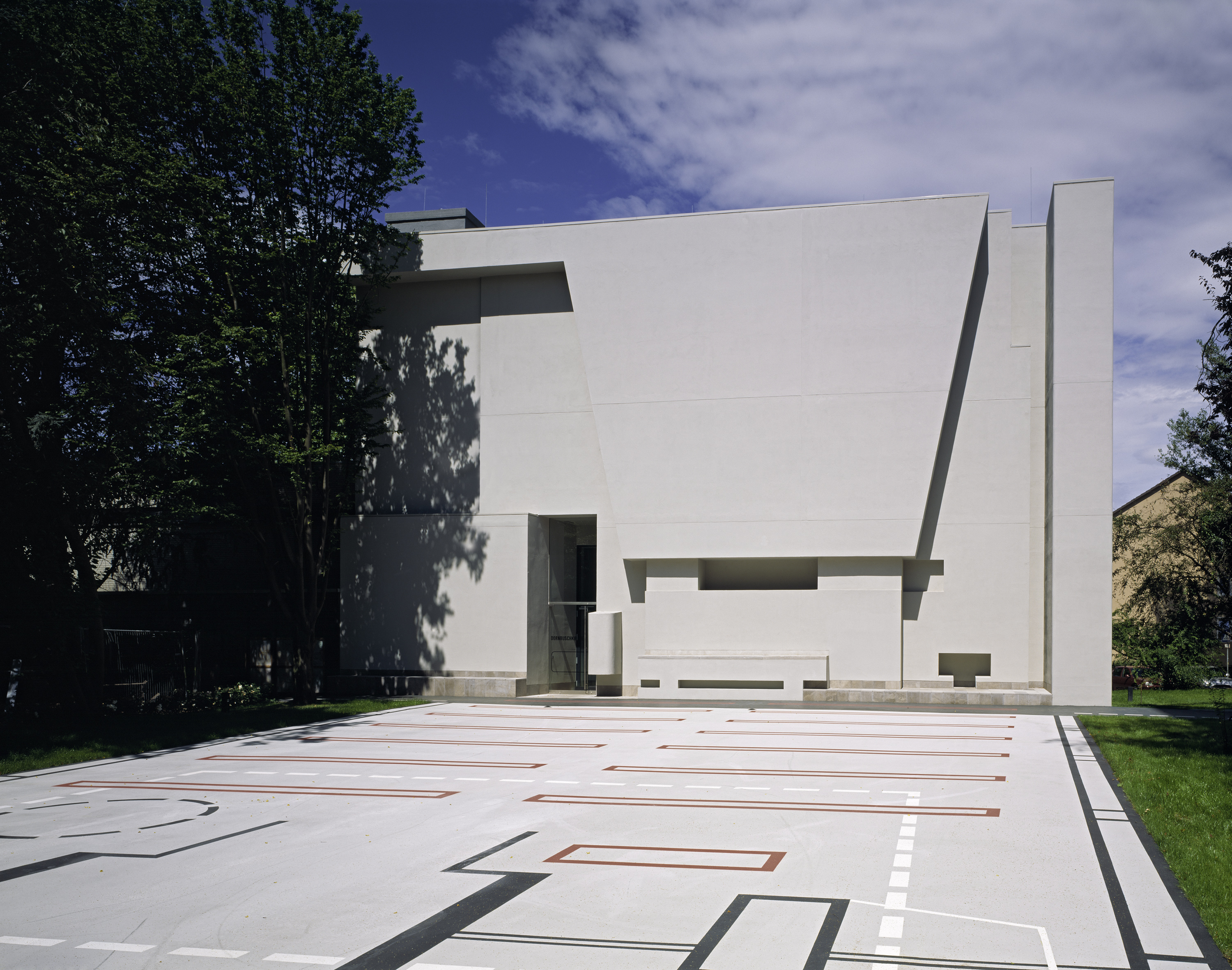
2008 Award winner, Religion & Contemplation: Dornbusch-Church, Germany, Frankfurt, by Meixner Schlüter Wendt

=== The 2009 festival ===
The second World Architecture Festival took place in Barcelona at the Centre Convencions International Barcelona (CCIB) on November 4 to 6 2009. Projects from 67 countries participated in the competition. 272 projects were shortlisted, in 15 categories. A jury of architects and industry figures from around the world judged the competition's 45 Awards. The winners of the 15 categories of completed buildings competed for the Building of the Year Award. In addition to the categories from the 2008 festival three new sections were added: Interiors and Fit-out, Structural Design and Future Projects. In 2009, 1,507 architects from 71 countries came to Barcelona for the festival.

Awards 2009

- World Building of the Year (Category: Culture, Completed Buildings ) Mapungubwe Interpretation Center in South Africa by Peter Rich Architects
- Future Project of the Year (Category: Cultural, Future Projects ) Spanish Pavilion for 2010 Expo Shanghai in China by Miralles Tagliabue EMBT
- Interiors and Fit Out Overall Winner (Category: Interiors and Fit Out - Retail (small) ) Corian Super-Surfaces Showroom in Italy, Milano by Architect Amanda Levete Architects
- Structural Design of the Year (Category: Structural Design - Spans (e.g. bridges, stadiums, big sheds) ) Arena Zagreb in Croatia, by Zagrebby Architect UPI-2M
- Student design competition (Category: Student design competition: Distressed Cities, Creative Responses ) AECOM Design + Planning Urban SOS in India, Mumbai by Sabrina Kleinenhammans, a graduate at MIT

Gallery of some of the 2009 winners

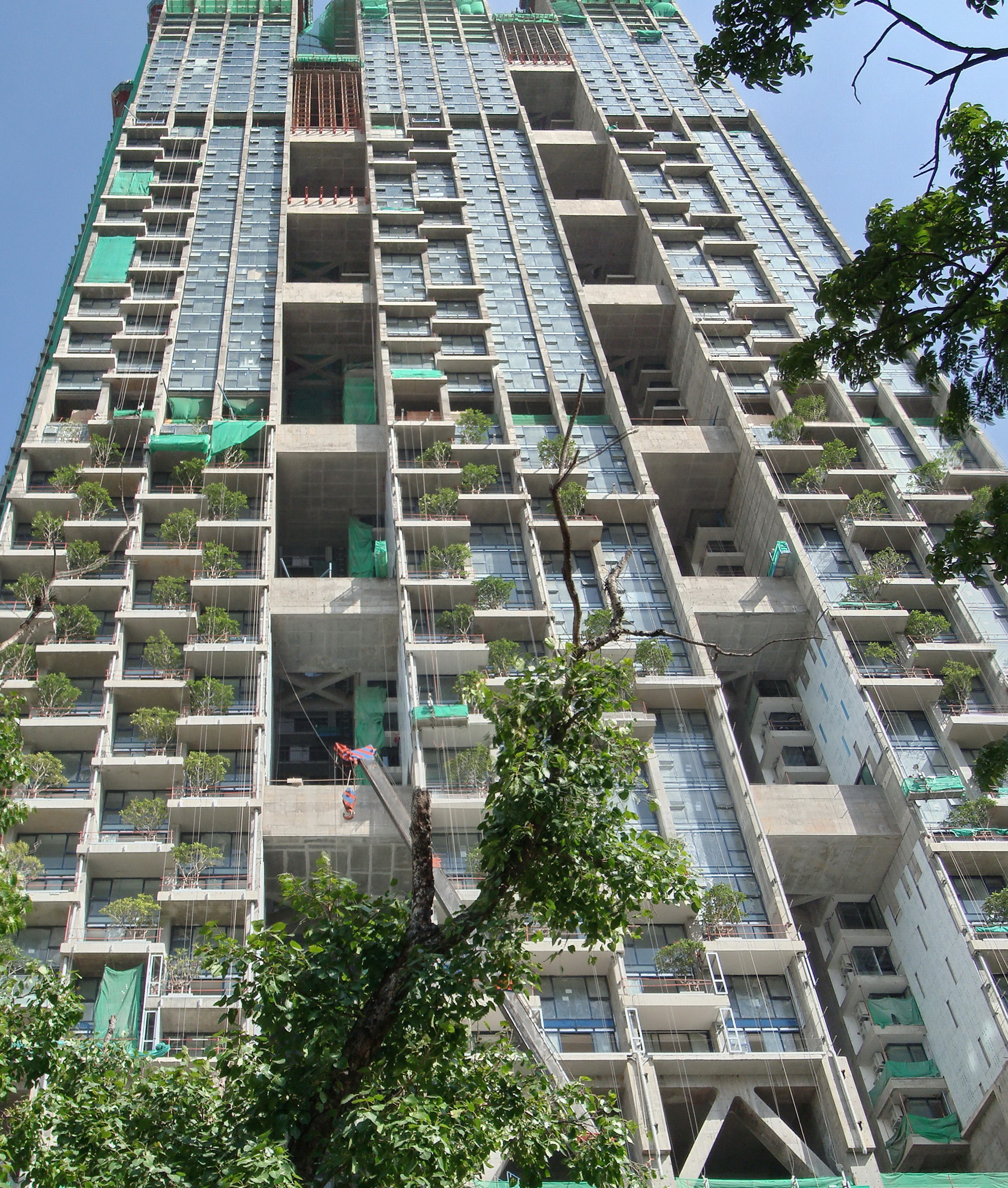
2009 Category Winner, Completed Buildings, Housing (inc mixed use) The Met, Thailand, Bangkok by WOHA

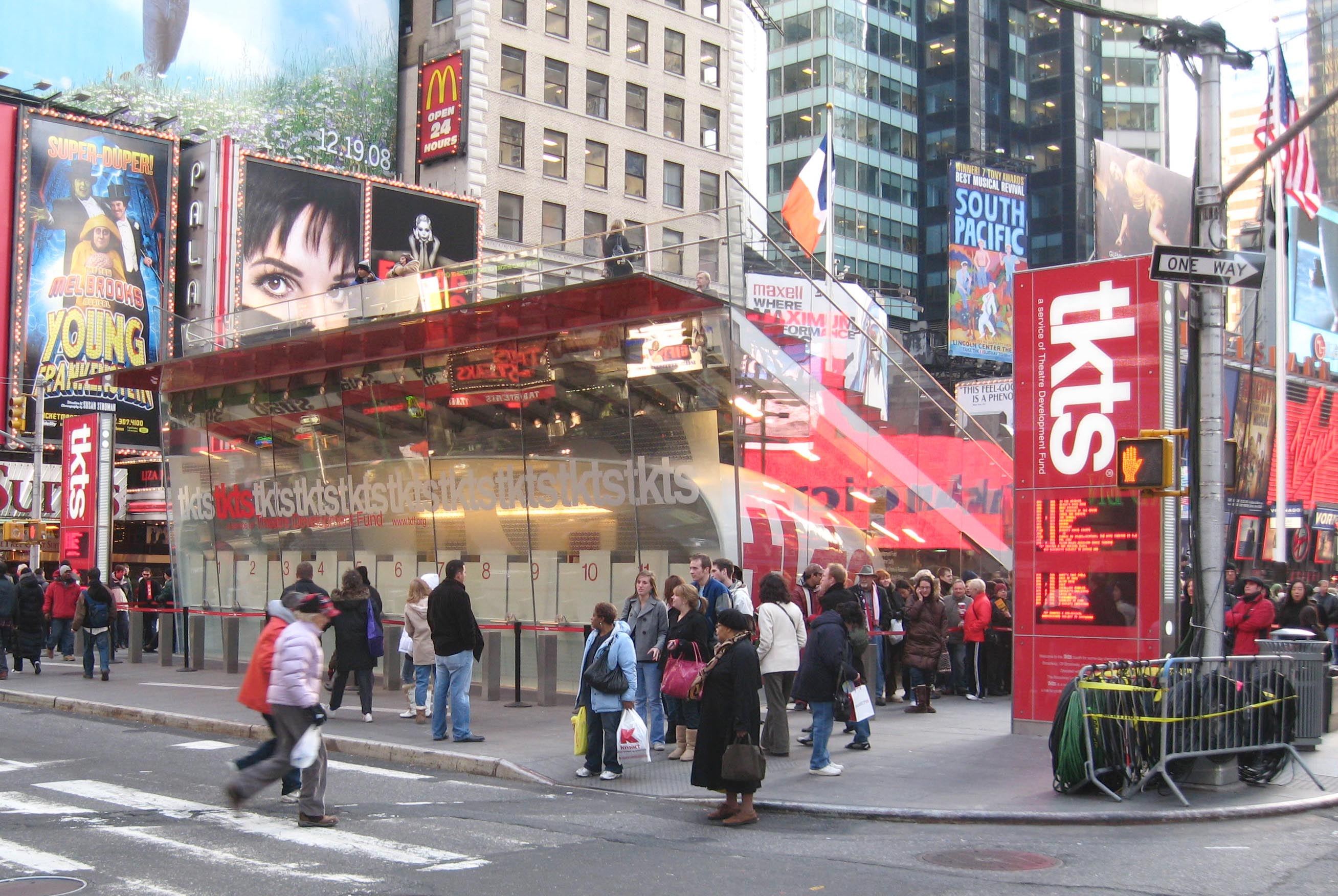
2009 Category Winner, Completed Buildings, New and old, TKTS Booth / Redevelopment of Father Duffy Square, USA, New York by Choi Ropiha, Perkins Eastman and William Fellows/PKSB Architects

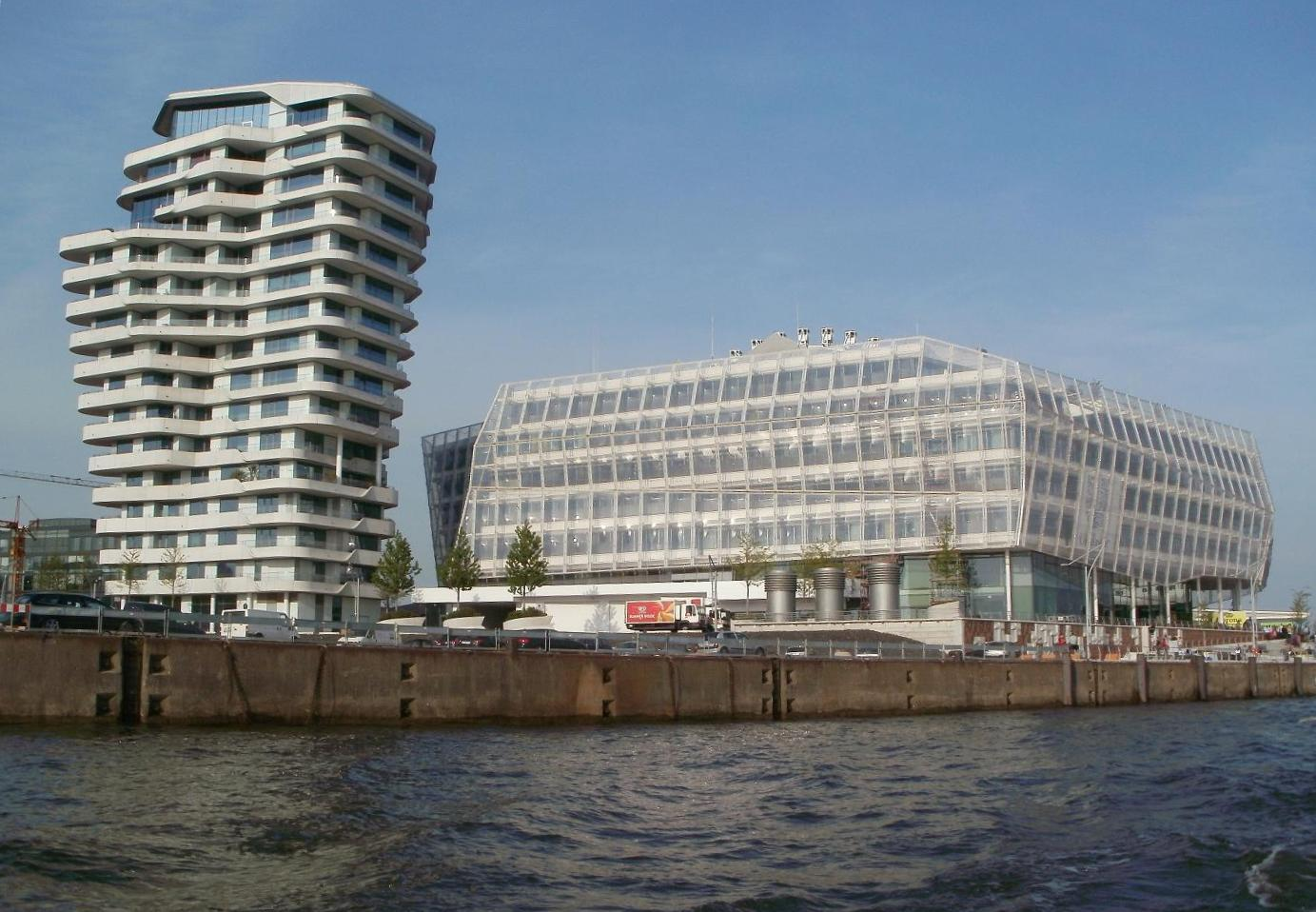
2009 Category Winner, Completed Buildings, Office (inc mixed use) Unileverhaus, Germany, Hamburg by Projektarbeitsgemeinschaft Behnisch Architekten

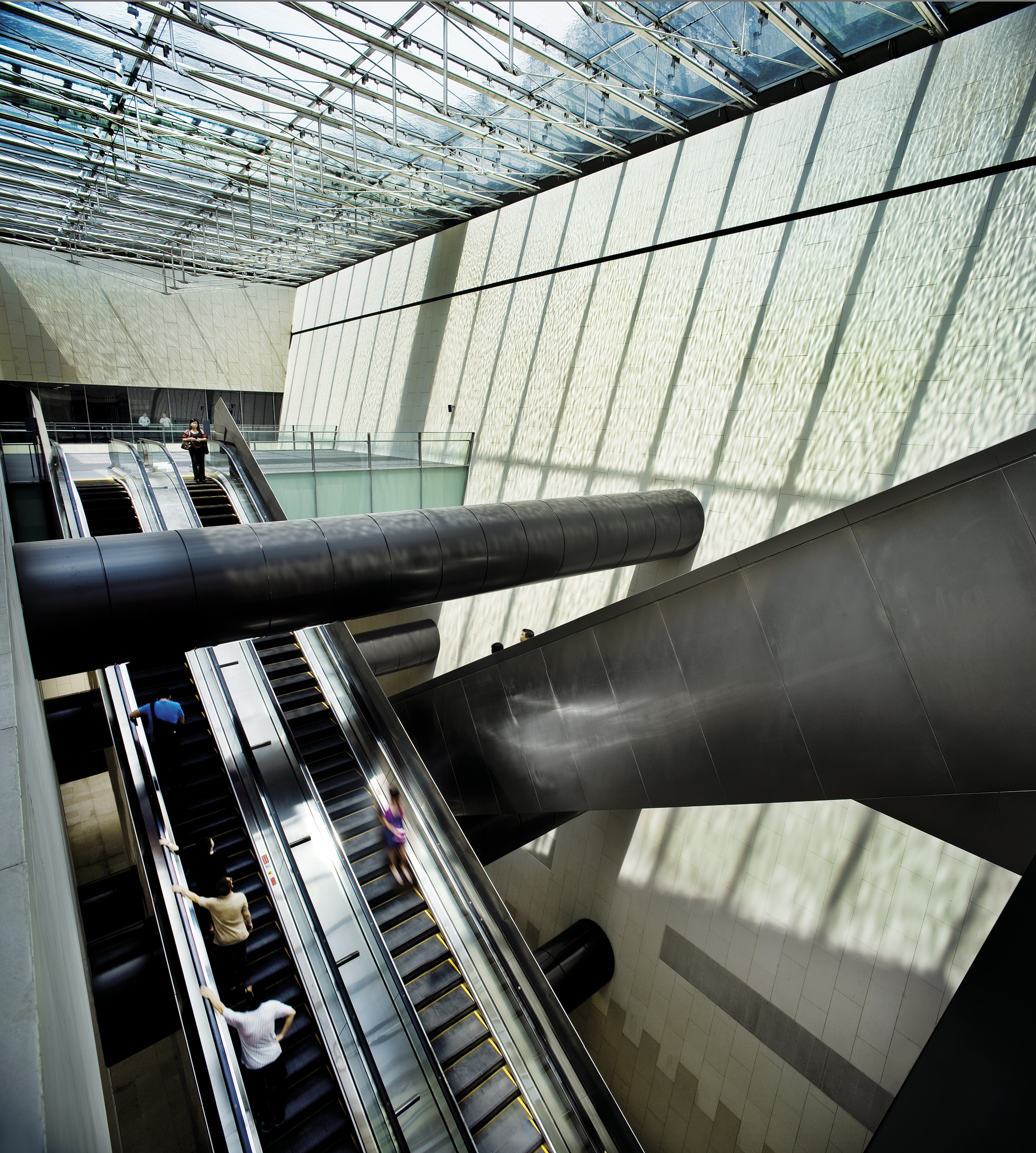
2009 Category Winner, Completed Buildings, Transport, Bras Basah Mass Rapid Transit stationSingapore, Republic of, Singapore by WOHA

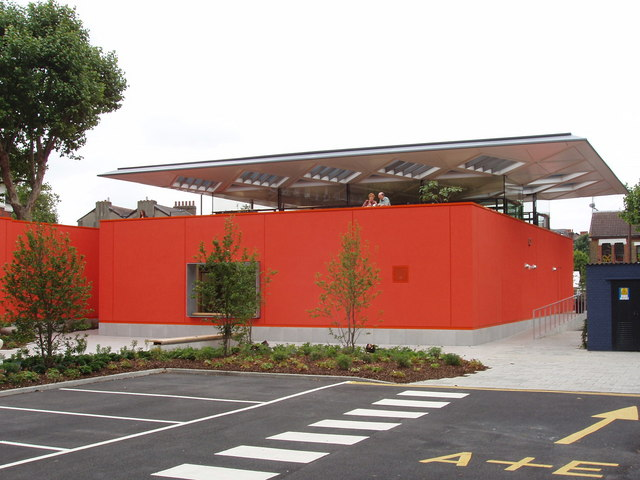
2009 Commendation, Completed Buildings, Health, Landscape, Maggie's Centre London, United Kingdom, London by Rogers Stirk Harbour + Partners

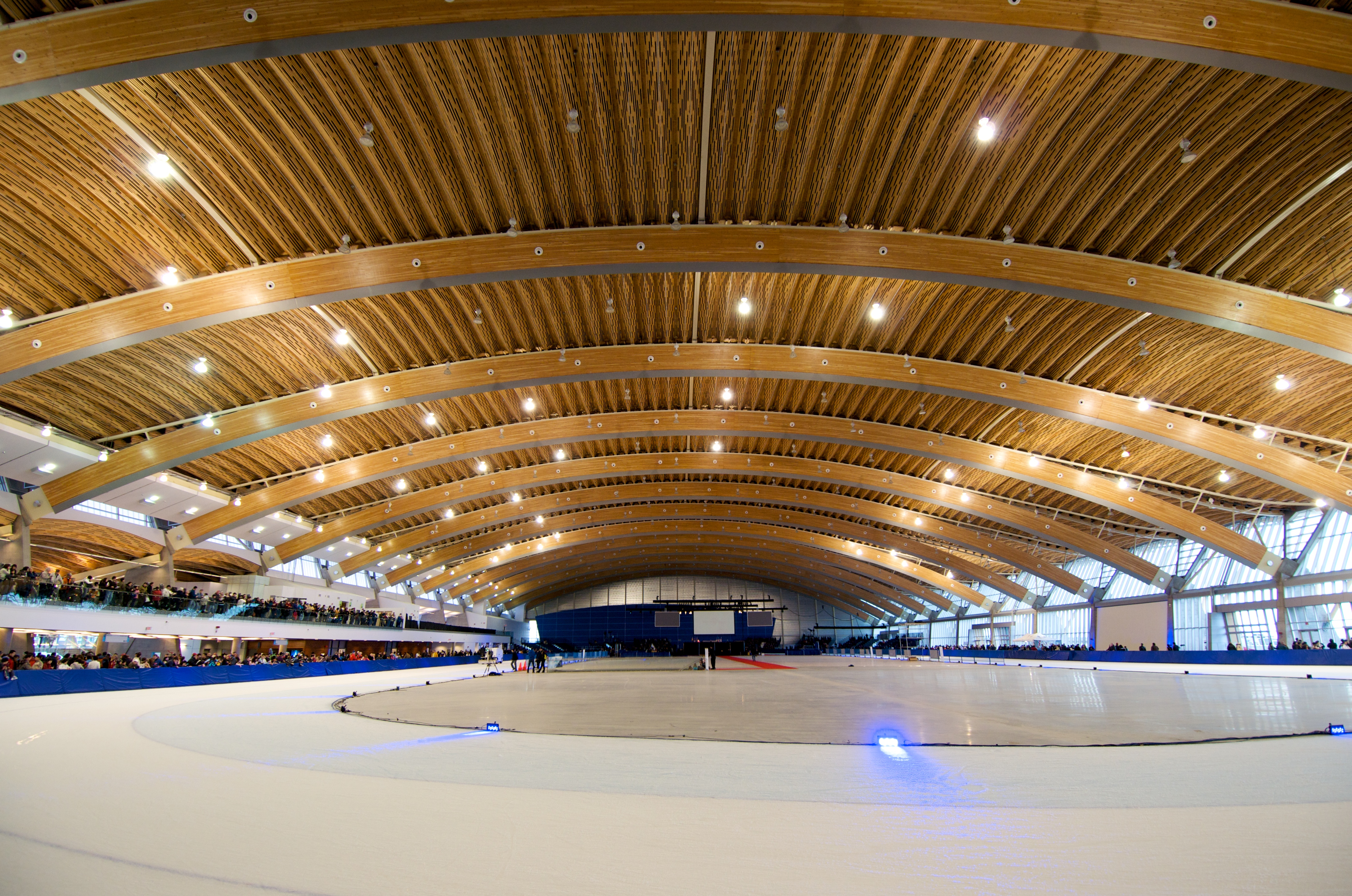
2009 Commendation, Structural Design, Spans (e.g. bridges, stadiums, big sheds), Structural Design - Timber: Richmond Olympic Oval Roof, Canada, Richmond by Cannon Design

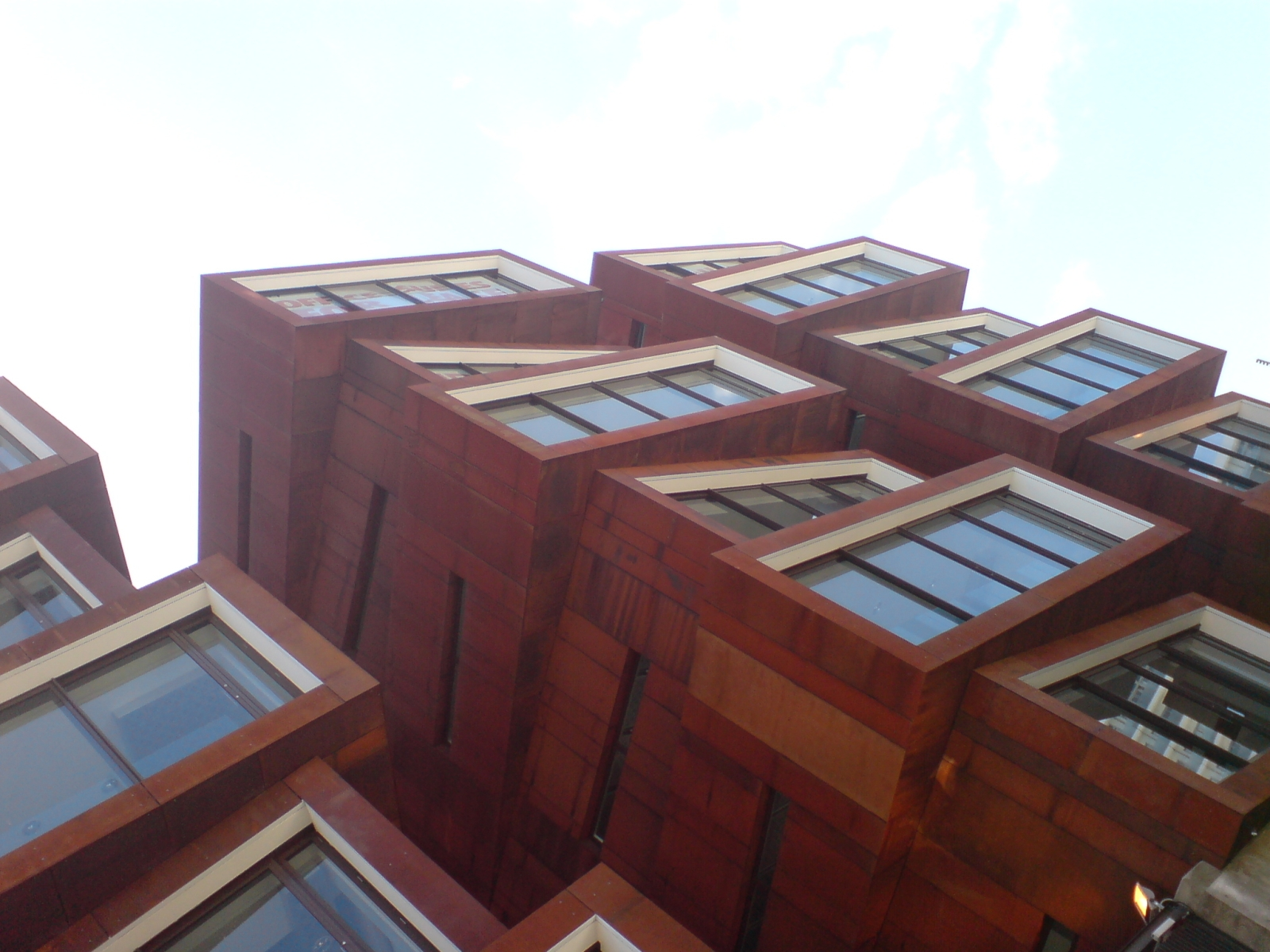
2009 Commendation, Completed Buildings: Ironbank (Auckland), New Zealand, by RTA Studio

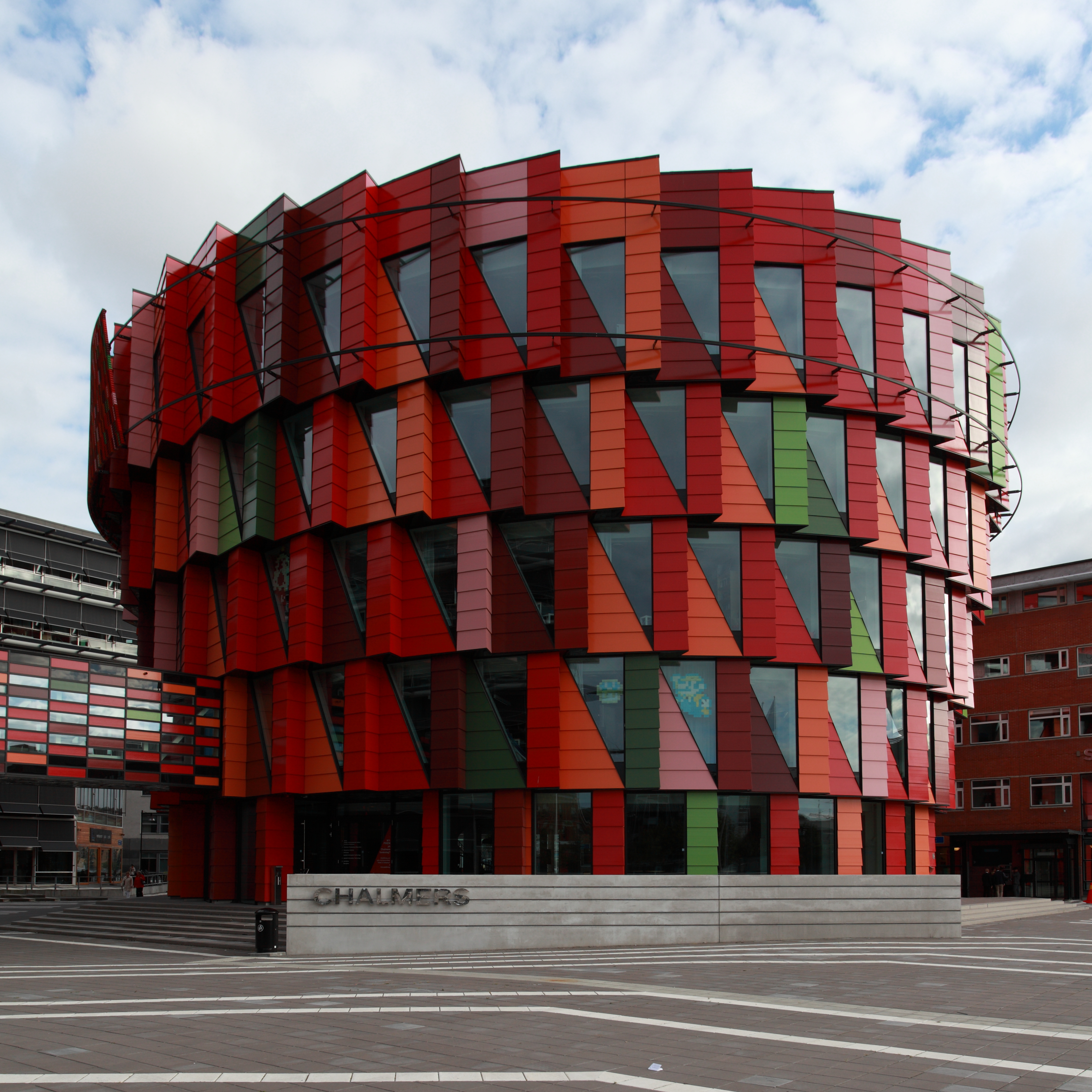
2009 Commendation, Future Projects: Kuggen, Sweden, by Wingårdh arkitektkontor AB

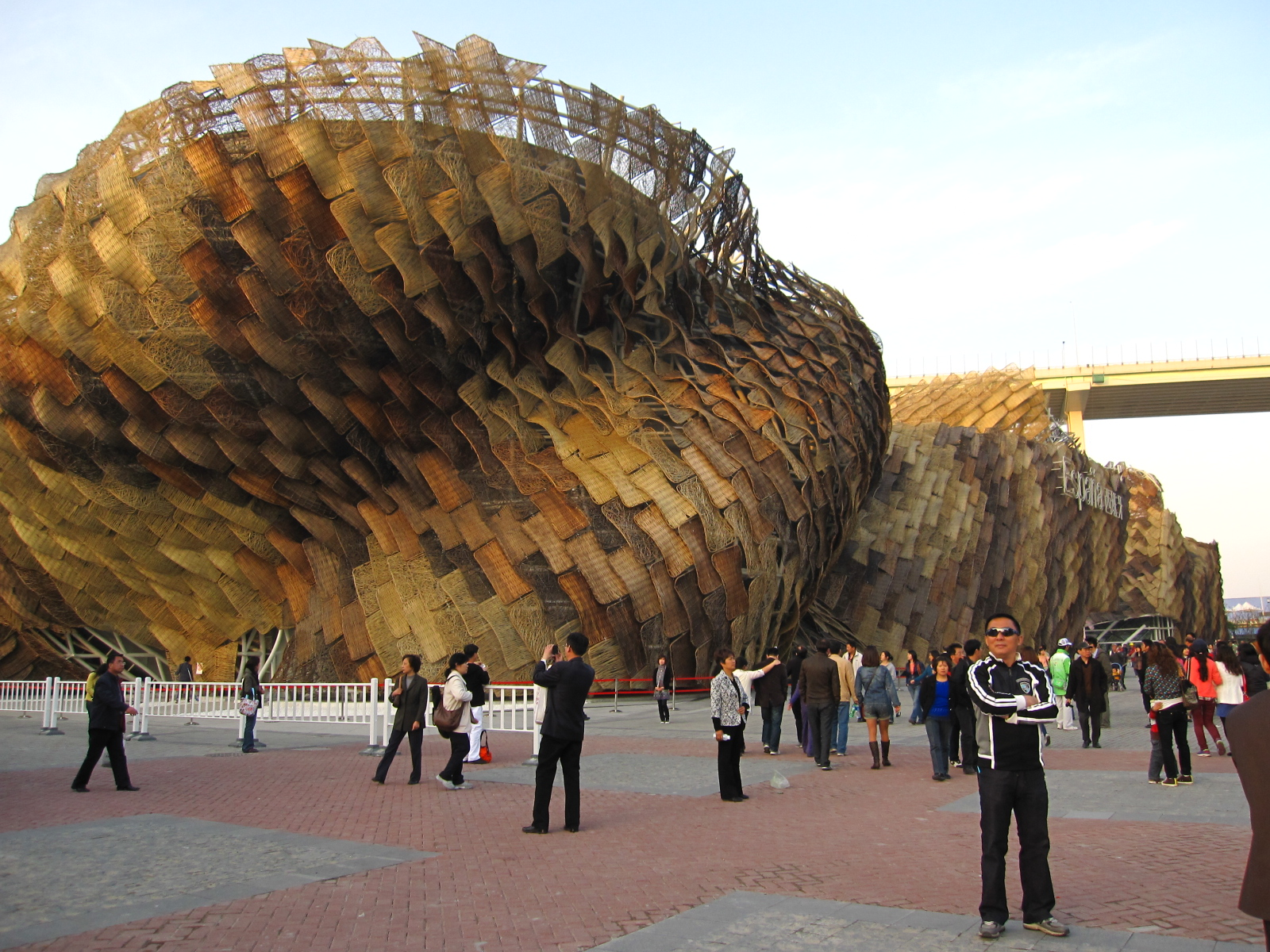
2009 Award winner: Future Project of the Year, Cultural, Future Projects, Spanish Pavilion for 2010 Expo Shanghai in China by Miralles Tagliabue EMBT

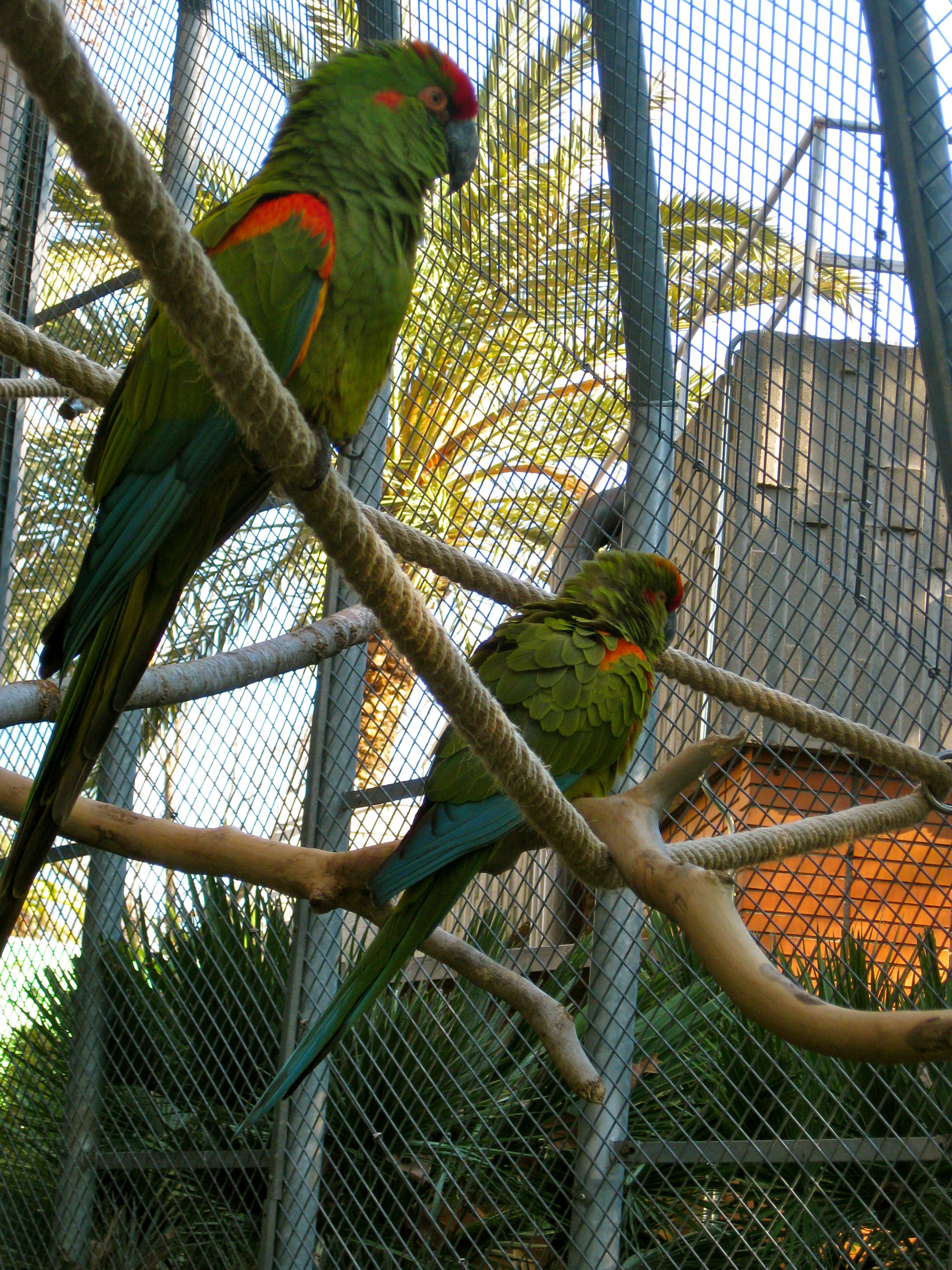
2009 Category Winner, Completed Buildings, Display: Cages for Macaws in the Palm Grove of Barcelona Zoo, Spain, Barcelonaby Batlle & Roig Architects

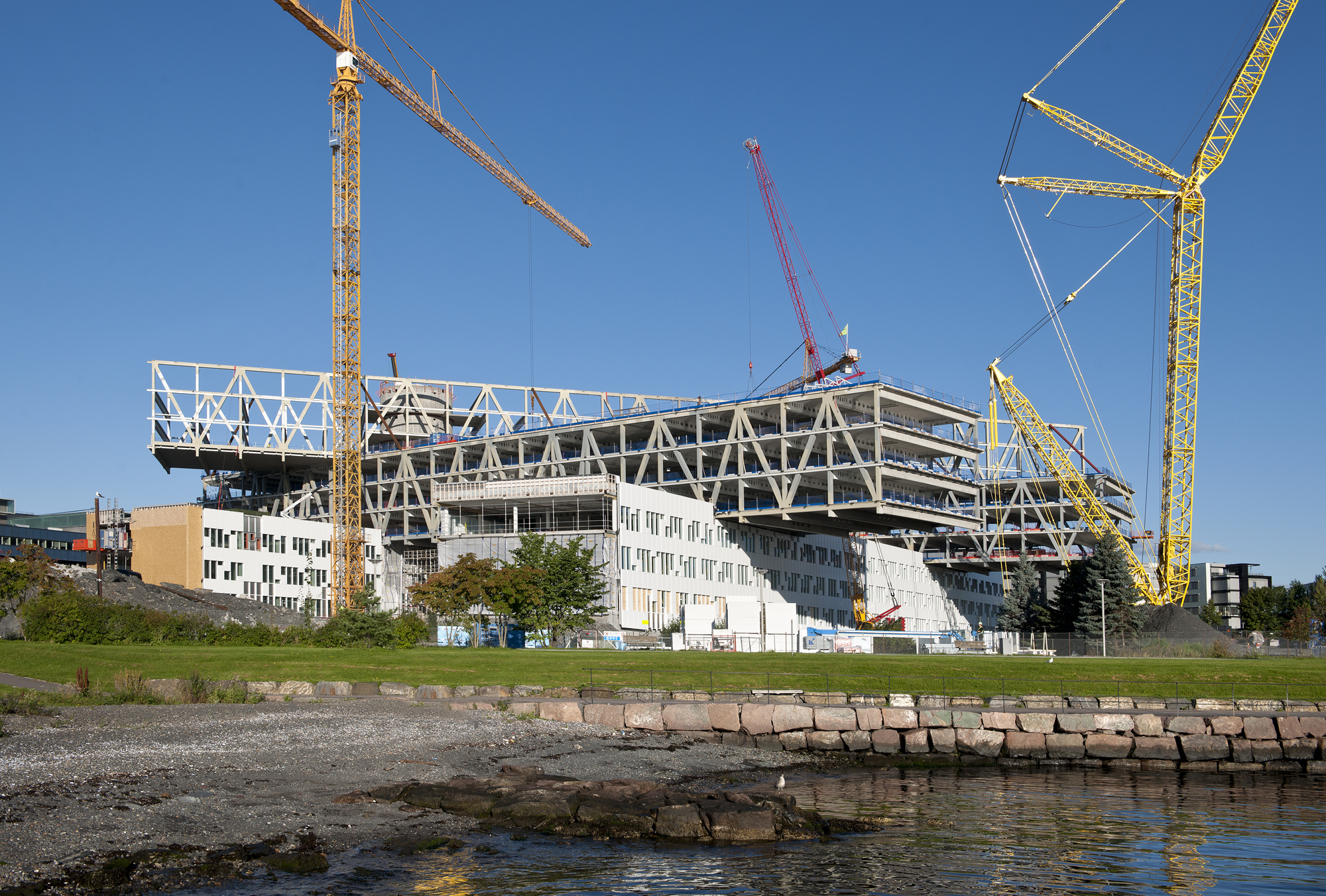
2009 Category Winner, Future Projects, Commercial: Statoil Hydro office, Norway, Oslo by a-lab

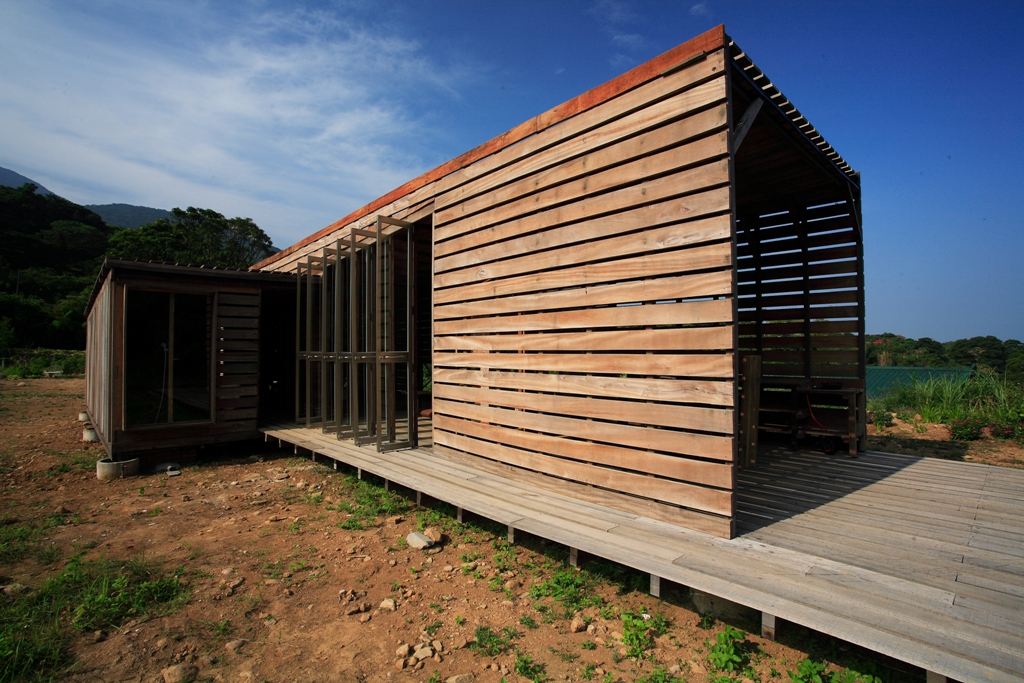
2009 Commendation, Completed Buildings, House: Chen House, Taiwan, Sanjhih by C-Laboratory

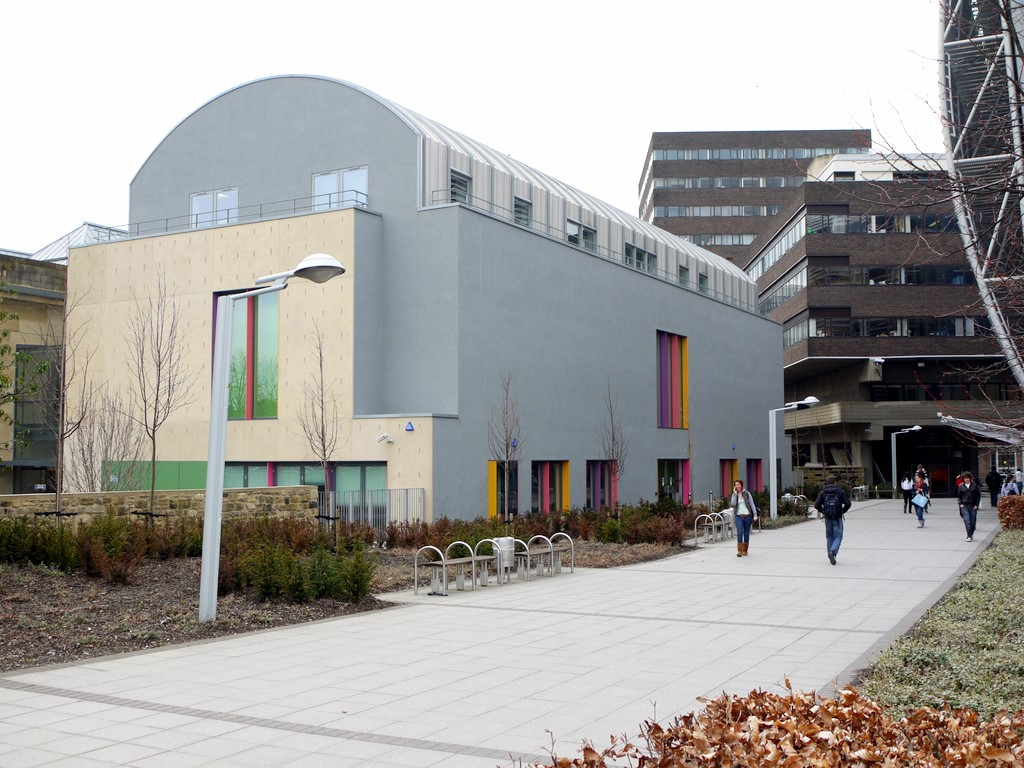
2009 Commendation, Interiors and Fit Out Culture, Interiors and Fit Out - Culture and civic, New and old: The Great North Museum, United Kingdom, Newcastle upon Tyne by Farrells

=== The 2010 festival ===
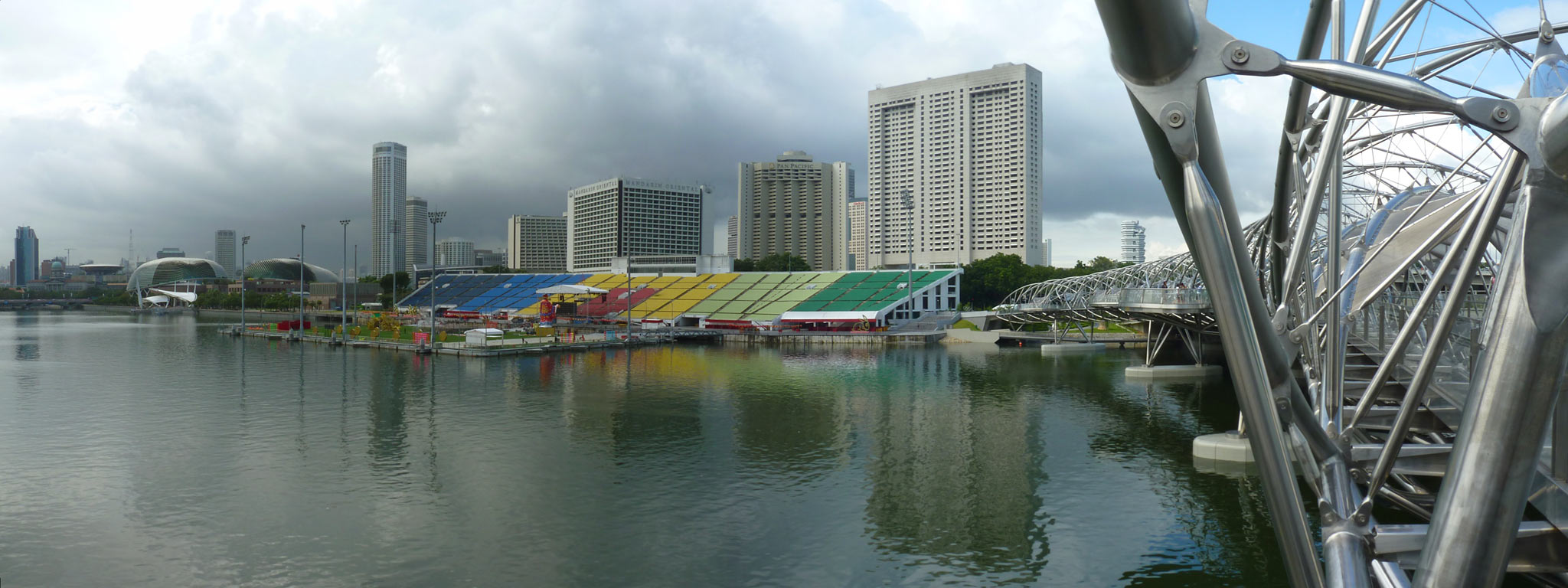
2010 Category Winner: Completed Buildings, Transport, The Helix Bridge, Singapore, by Cox Rayner Architects & Architects 61

The third World Architecture festival took place in Barcelona at the CCIB Forum (Centro de Convenciones Internacionales de Barcelona) November 3 to 5 2010. The festival was the largest and most comprehensive of its kind in 2010. More than 500 entries from 65 countries competed in 15 main categories and in over 20 further sections. The festival had 5 awards sections, 42 categories and more than 100 types of buildings. The competition was open for entries on April 2 to July 9 and the shortlist was announced in late August. The shortlisted projects were presented at the festival.

Awards 2010

- World Building of the Year and winner of category culture (Category: Culture ) MAXXI, National Museum of XXI Century Arts in Italy, Rome by Zaha Hadid Architects
- Future Project of the Year (Category: Masterplanning, Future Projects ) The Arc in Palestinian Territory, Occupied by Suisman Urban Design
- Interiors and Fit Out Overall Winner (Category: Interiors and Fit Out - Offices ) ANZ Centre in Australia, Melbourne by Hassell
- Structural Design of the Year (Category: Structural Design - Glass (where used structurally) ) Medieval & Renaissance Galleries in United Kingdom, London by MUMA
- Student design competition (Category: Student design competition): Campus Catalyst Project AECOM Design + Planning Urban SOSin Haiti, Port-au-Prince by Robin Bankert, Michael Murphy, Robin Bankert, Michael Murphy, Caroline Shannon and Joseph Wilfong, University of Harvard
- The Art and Work Award for Buildings Designed to Display Art (Category: Structural Design - Glass (where used structurally) ) Medieval & Renaissance Galleries in United Kingdom, London by MUMA
- ONCE Foundation Award for Accessibility (Two joint winners) (Category: Sport ) Aviva Stadium in Ireland, Dublinby Populous in association with Scott Tallon Walker
- ONCE Foundation Award for Accessibility (Two joint winners) (Category: Civic and community, Health) West Vancouver Community Centre in Canada, West Vancouver by Hughes Condon Marler Architects

Gallery of some of the 2010 winners

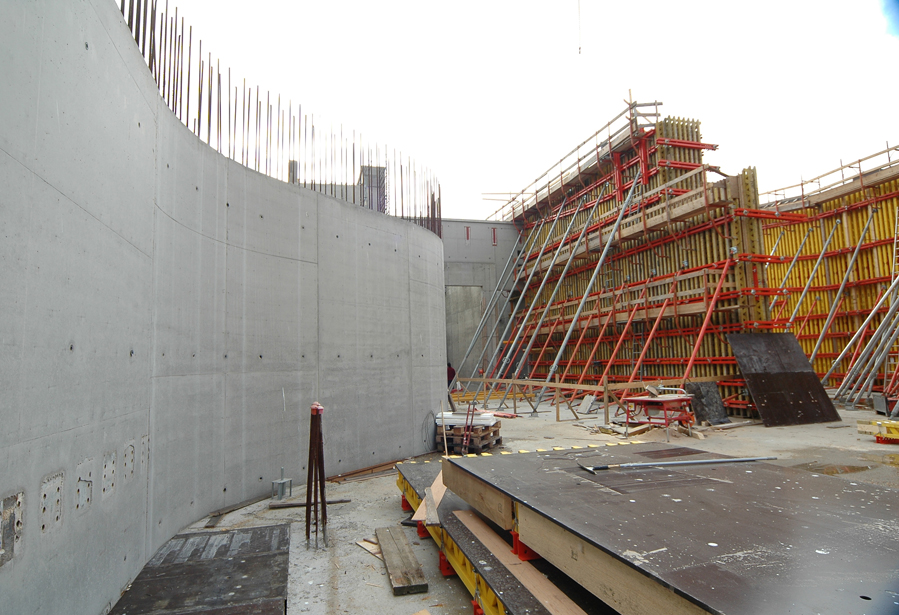
2010 Award winner: World Building of the Year and winner of category culture: MAXXI, National Museum of XXI Century Arts, Italy, Rome by Zaha Hadid Architects

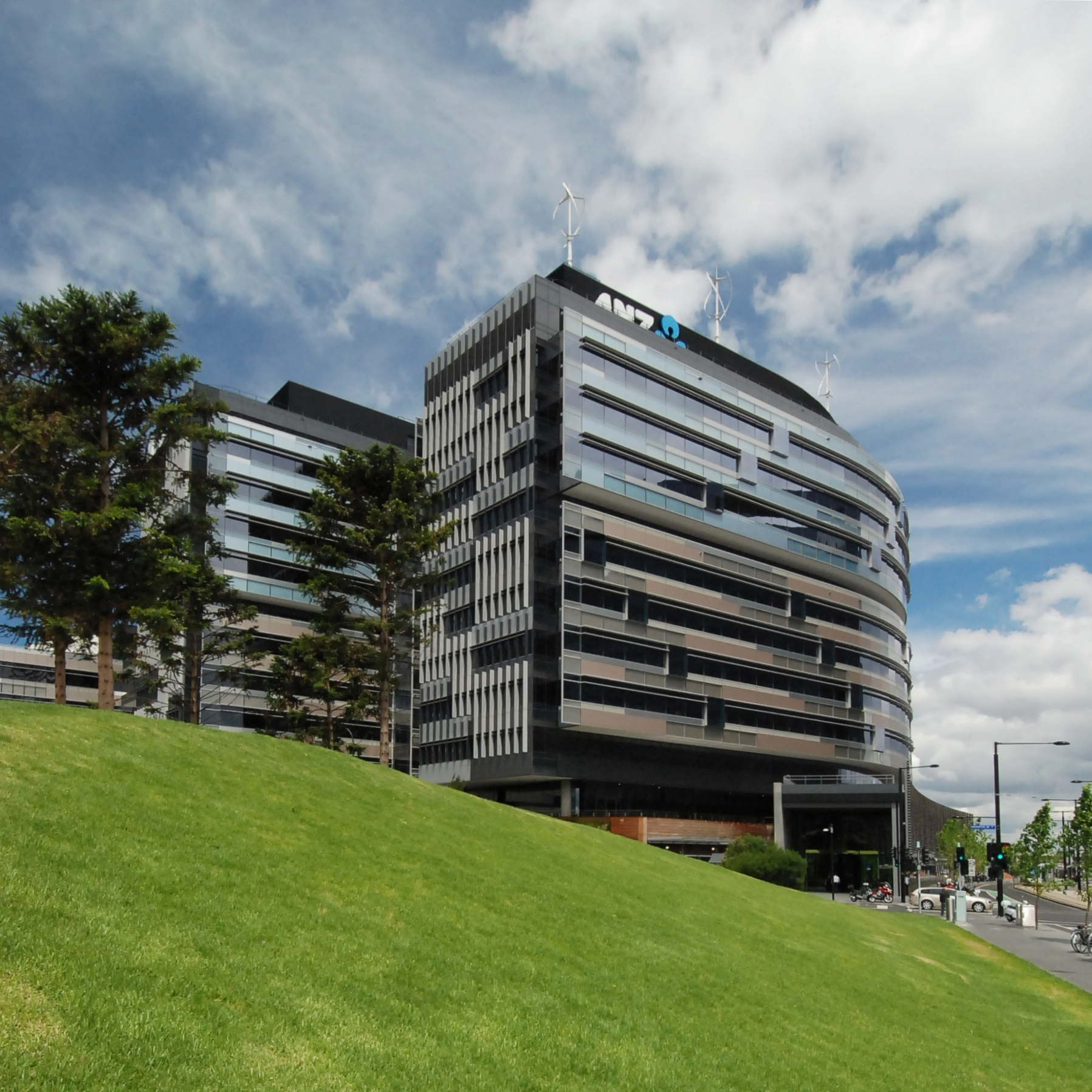
2010 Award winner: Interiors and Fit Out Overall Winner, Interiors and Fit Out of the Year: ANZ Centre, Melbourne by Hassell

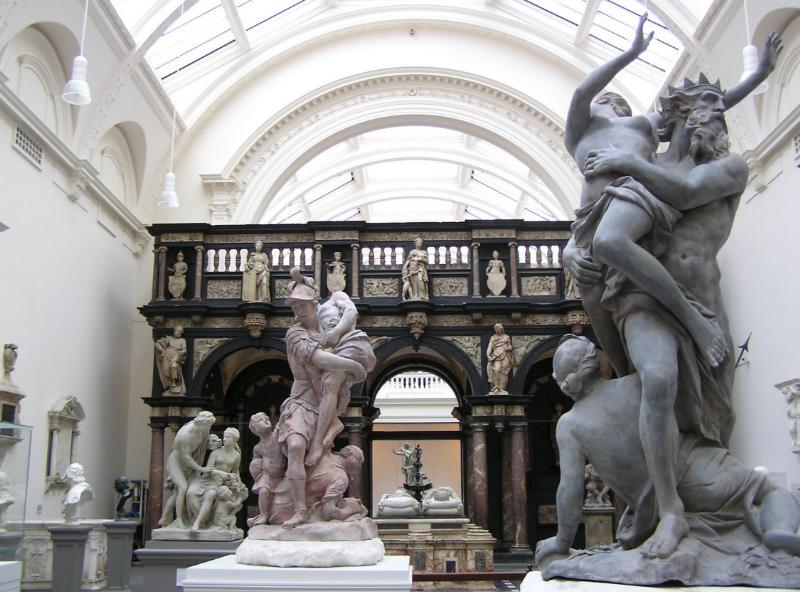
2010 Award winner: Structural Design of the Year, Structural Design - Glass (where used structurally): Medieval & Renaissance Galleries, United Kingdom, London by MUMA

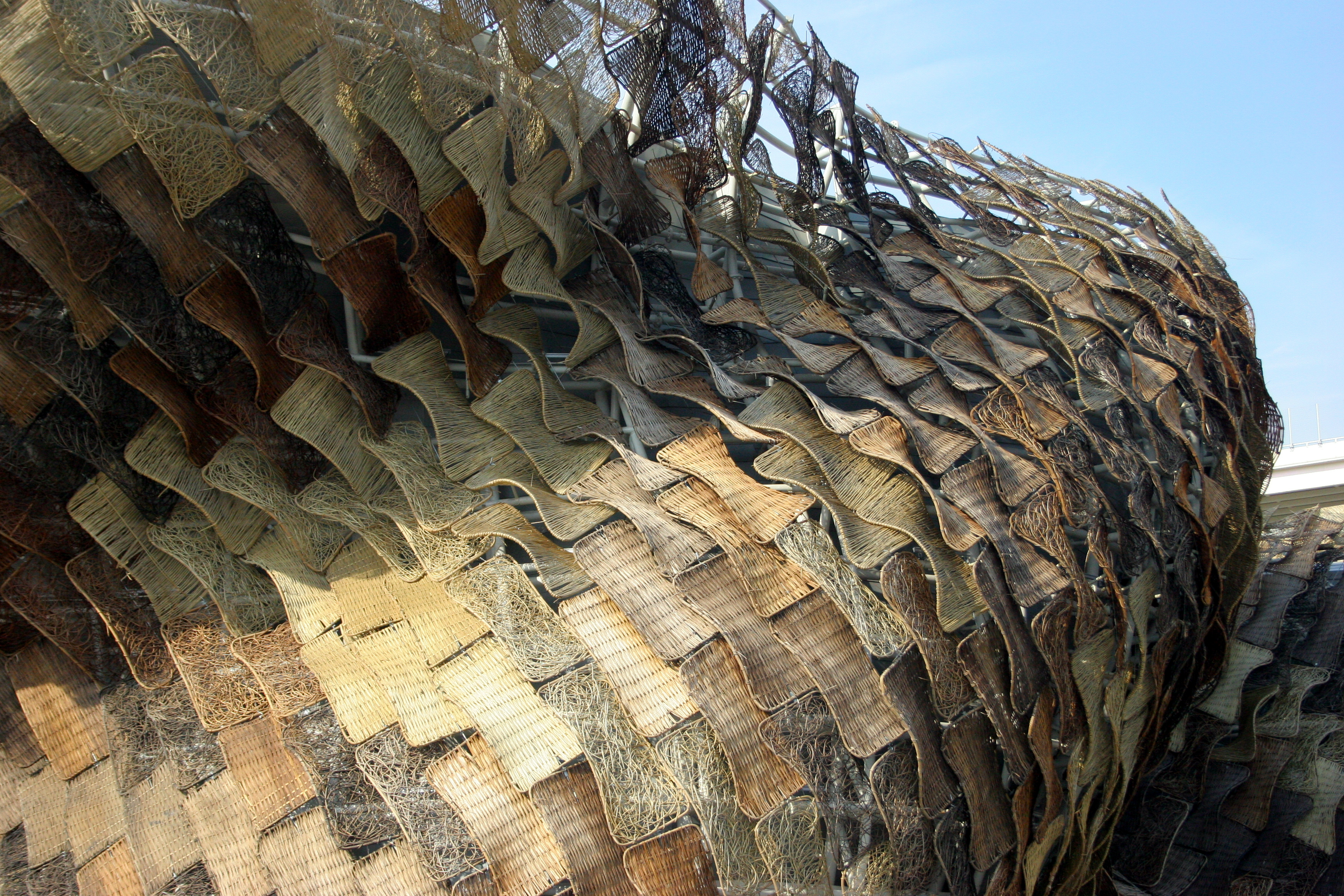
2010 Category Winner, Completed Buildings, Display: Spanish Pavilion for Shanghai World Expo 2010, China, Shanghai by Miralles Tagliabue EMBT & Benedetta Tagliabue, Miralles Tagliabue EMBT

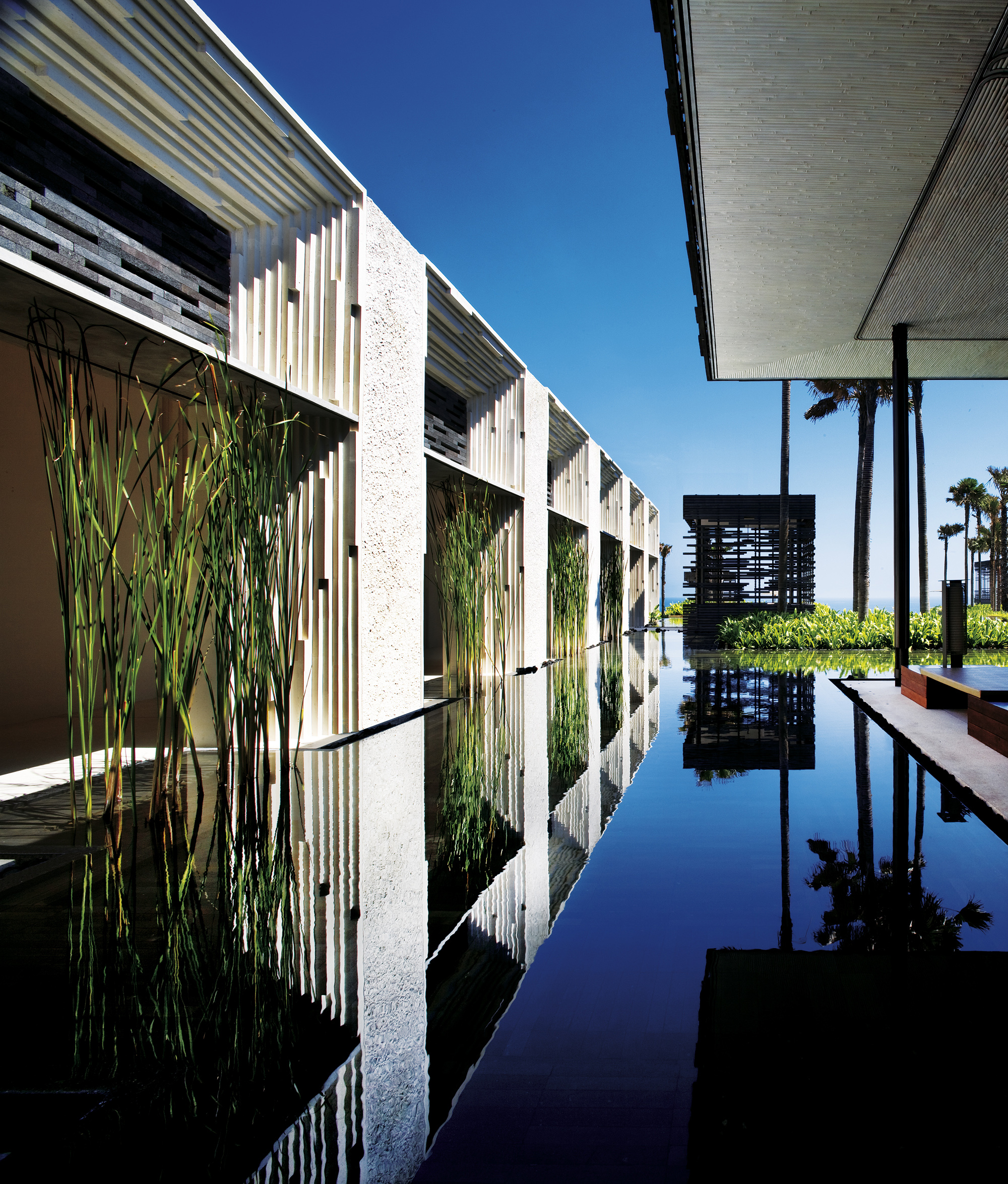
2010 Category Winner, Completed Buildings, Holiday: Alila Villas Uluwatu, Bali Indonesia, Indonesia, Bali by WOHA

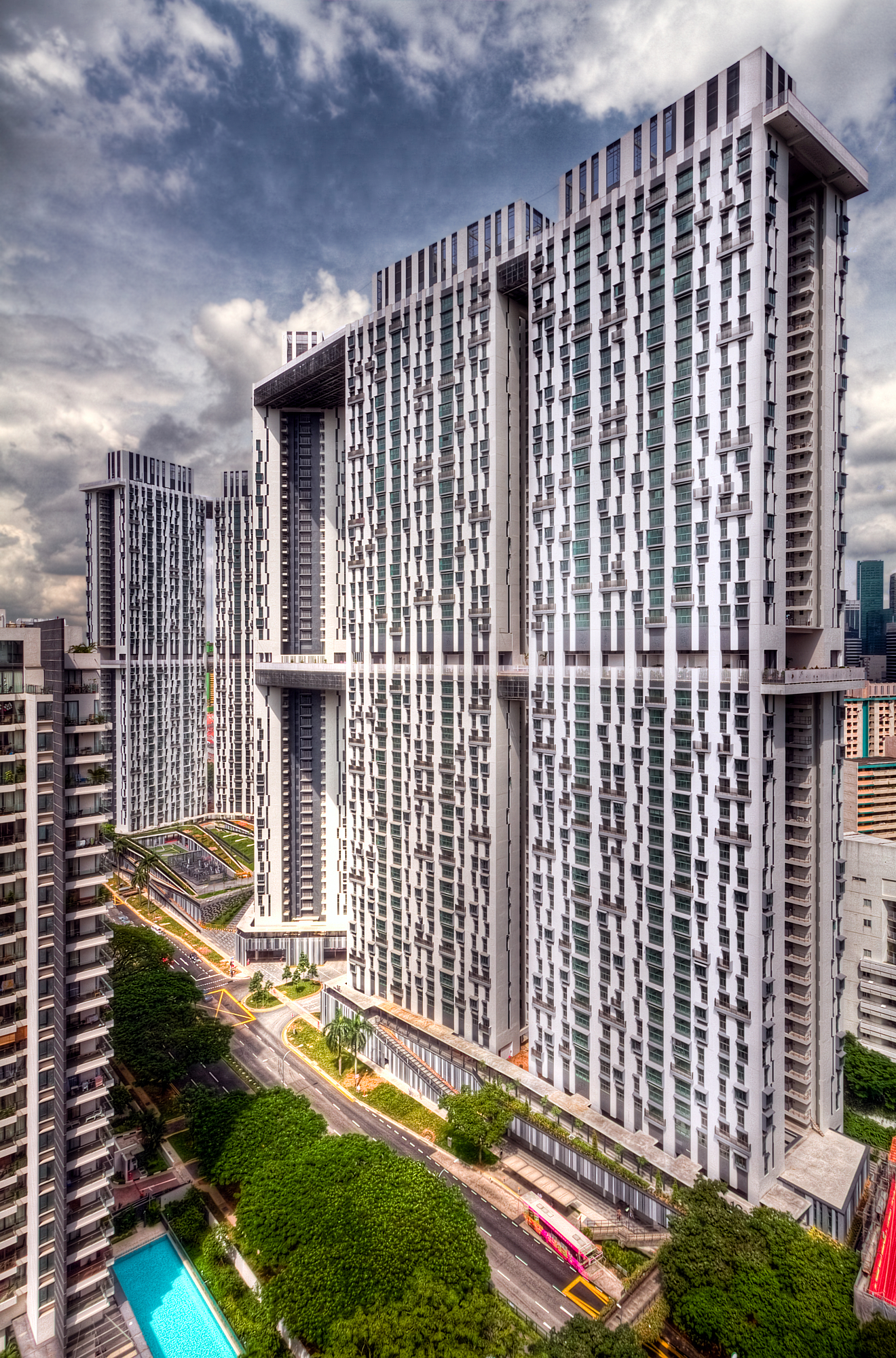
2010 Category Winner, Completed Buildings, Housing (inc mixed use): Pinnacle @ Duxton, Singapore, Republic of by ARC Studio Architecture + Urbanism

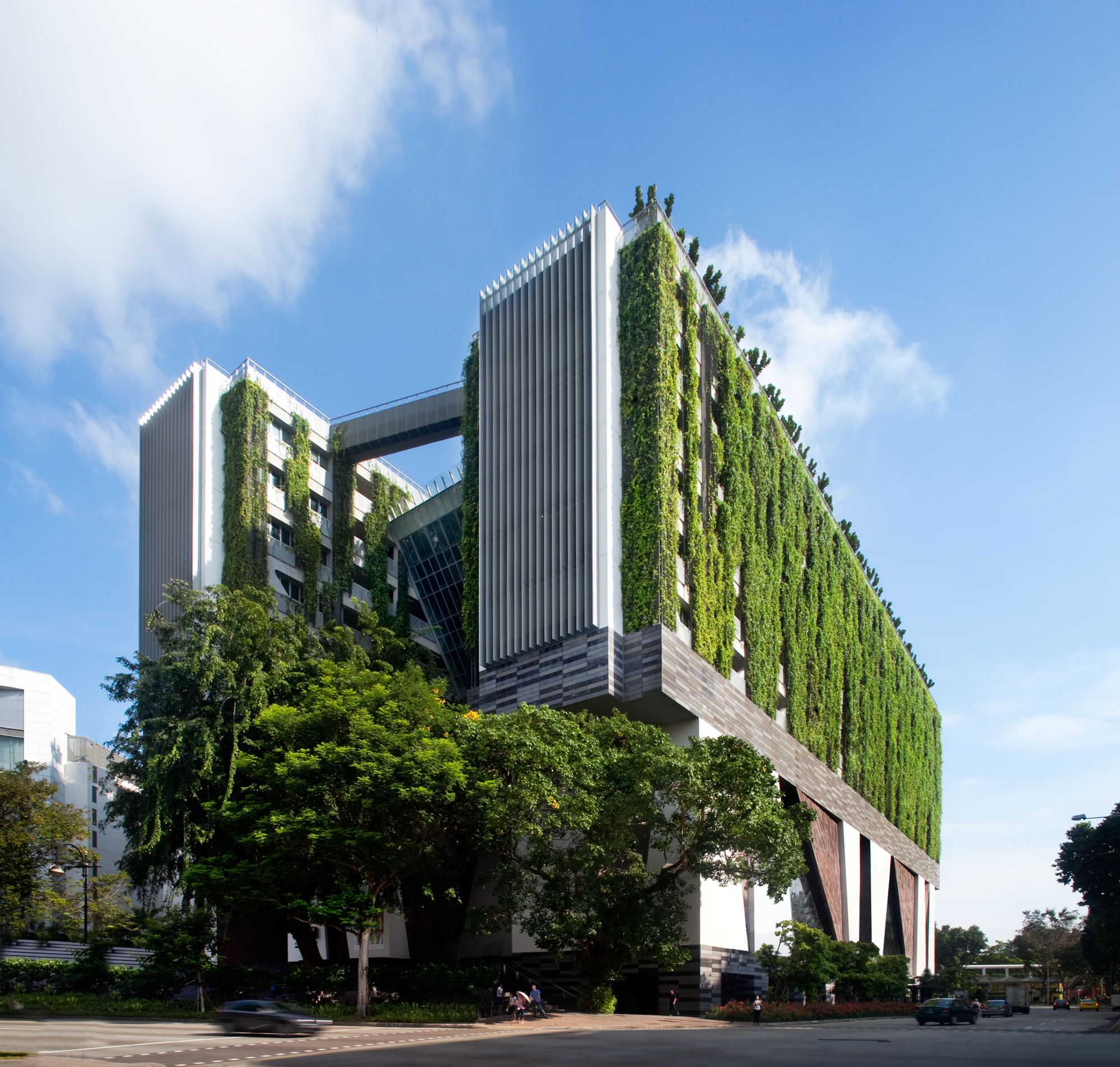
2010 Category Winner, Completed Buildings, Learning: School of the Arts, Singapore, Singapore, Republic of, Singapore by WOHA

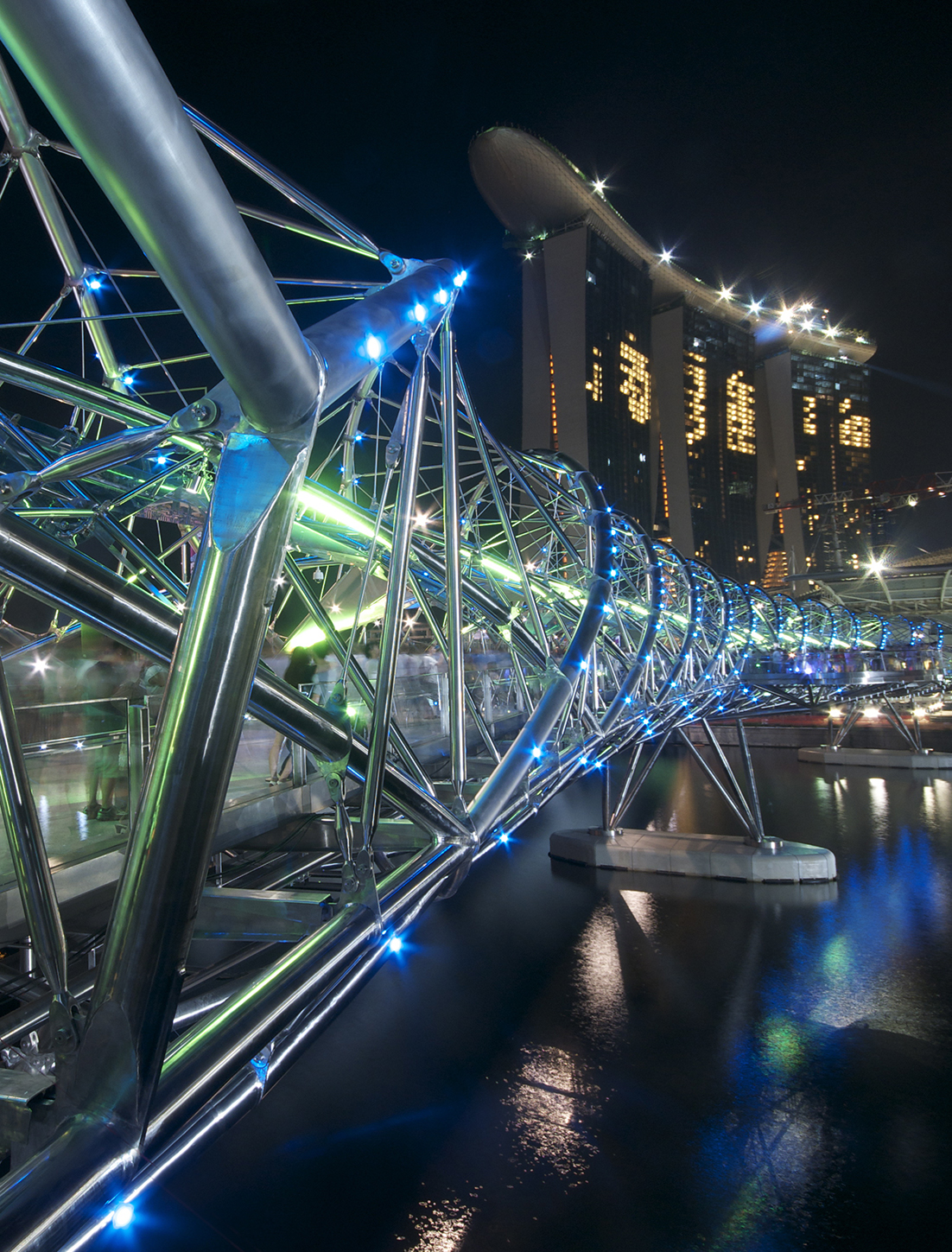
2010 Category Winner: Completed Buildings, Transport, The Helix Bridge, Singapore, by Cox Rayner Architects & Architects 61

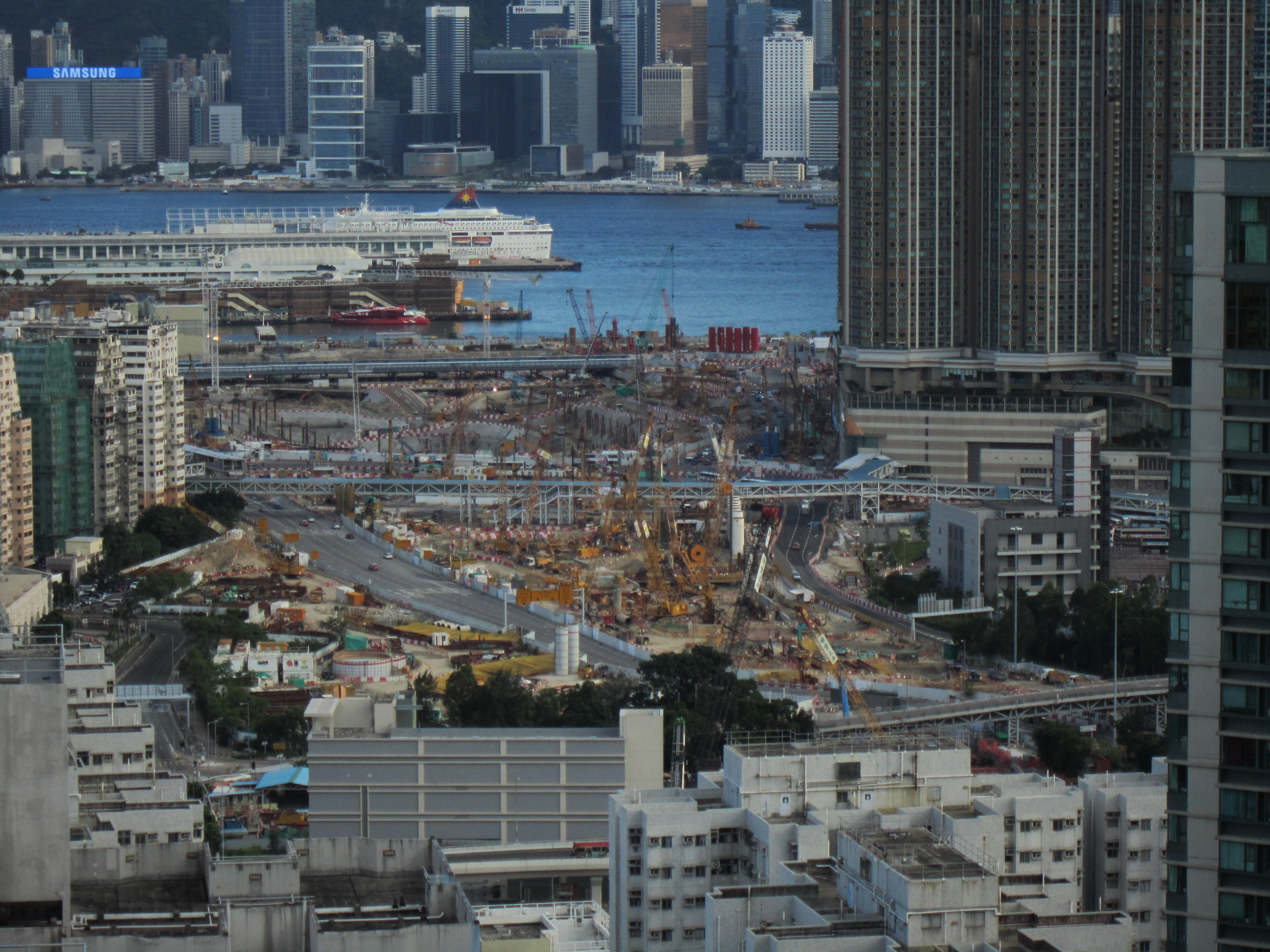
2010 Category Winner, Future Projects, Infrastructure, Future Projects: West Kowloon Terminus, Hong Kong by Aedas

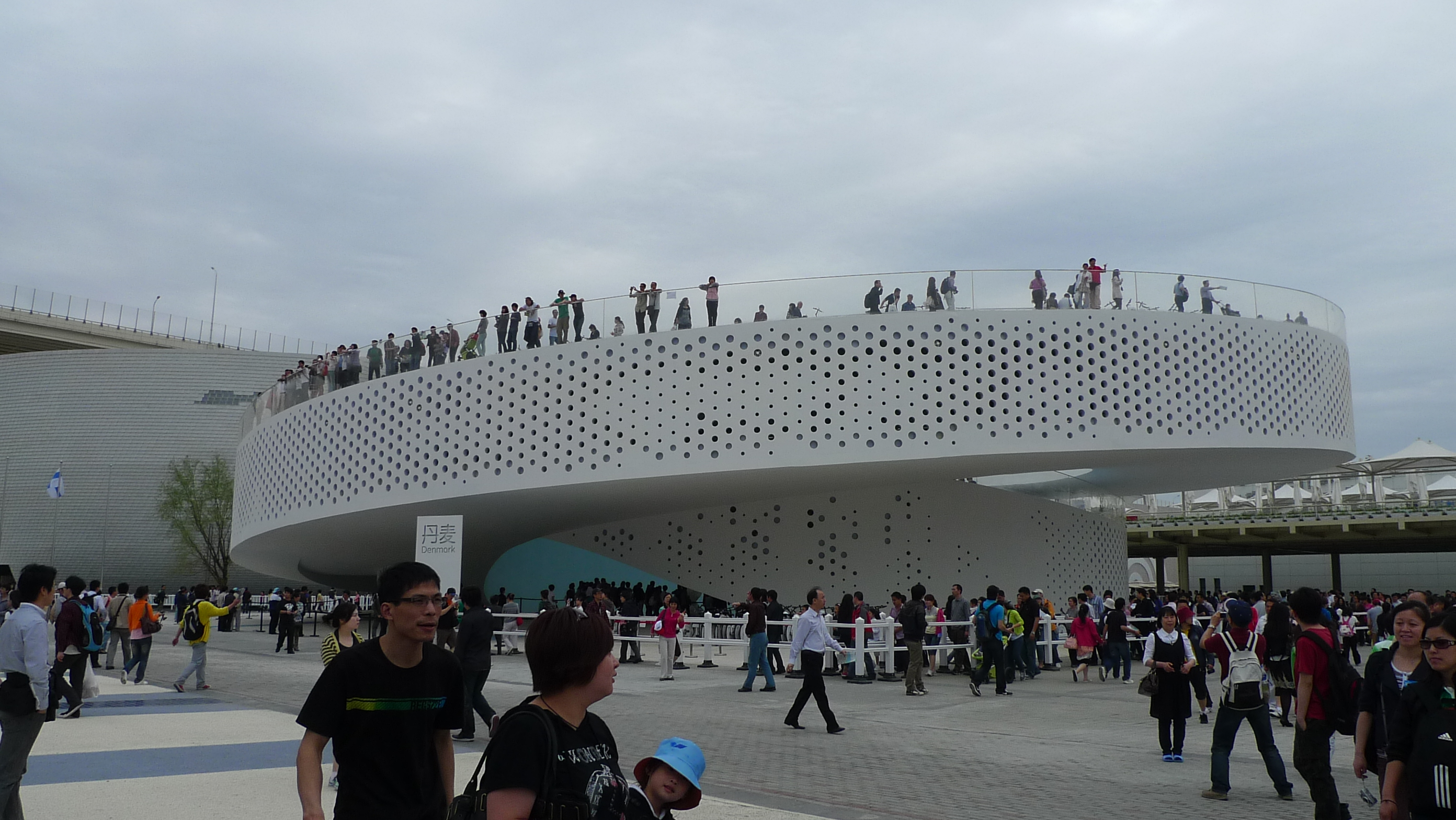
2010 Commendation, Completed Buildings, Display: Danish Pavilion - Shanghai World Expo 2010 in China, Shanghai by BIG

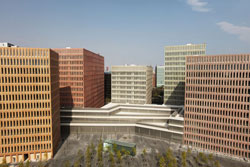
2010 Category Winner, Completed Buildings, Civic and community: City of Justice, Spain, Barcelona by David Chipperfield Architects and b720 Arquitectos

=== The 2011 festival ===
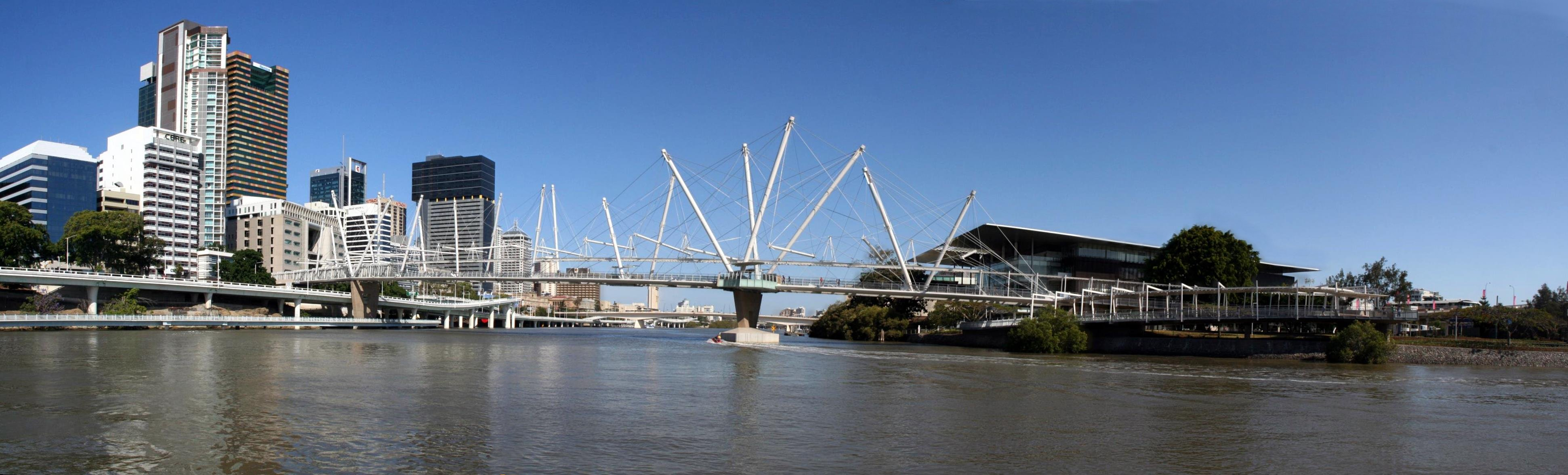
2011 Transport of the Year: Kurilpa Bridge, Brisbane, Australia, by Cox Rayner Architects

The fourth World Architecture Festival (WAF) was held in Barcelona from November 2 to 4, 2011, at Centre de Convencions Internacional de Catalunya. More than 700 projects were entered for the competition. More than 1,300 people attended the awards ceremony. The competition opened for entries on April 1 and closed on June 30, 2011. In 2011 Michael Sorkin, Ben van Berkel, Jo Noero, Odile Decq and Professor Kongjian Yu, and Tim MacFarlane were members of the jury. The opening night was held inMedia-ICT (by Cloud 9) which was later to win the World Building of the Year Award. The World Building of the Year was elected from the 16 completed buildings winning their category.

Awards 2011

- World Building of the Year (Category: Office (inc mixed use) ) Media-ICT in Spain, Barcelona by Cloud 9
- Future Project of the Year (Category: Infrastructure, Future Projects ) Hanimaadhoo International Airport in Maldives by Integrated Design Associates Limited
- Structural Design of the Year (Category: Structural Design - Towers ) Eight Spruce Street in United States of America by Gehry Partners, LLP
- ONCE Foundation Award for Accessibility (Category: Culture ) Museum of Memory and Tolerance in Mexico, Mexico City by Arditti+RDT/arquitectos
- People's Choice Award, by OpenBuildings (Category: Culture ) Memorial house Todor Proeski in Macedonia, Krushevoby Syndicate studio

Gallery of some of the 2011 winners

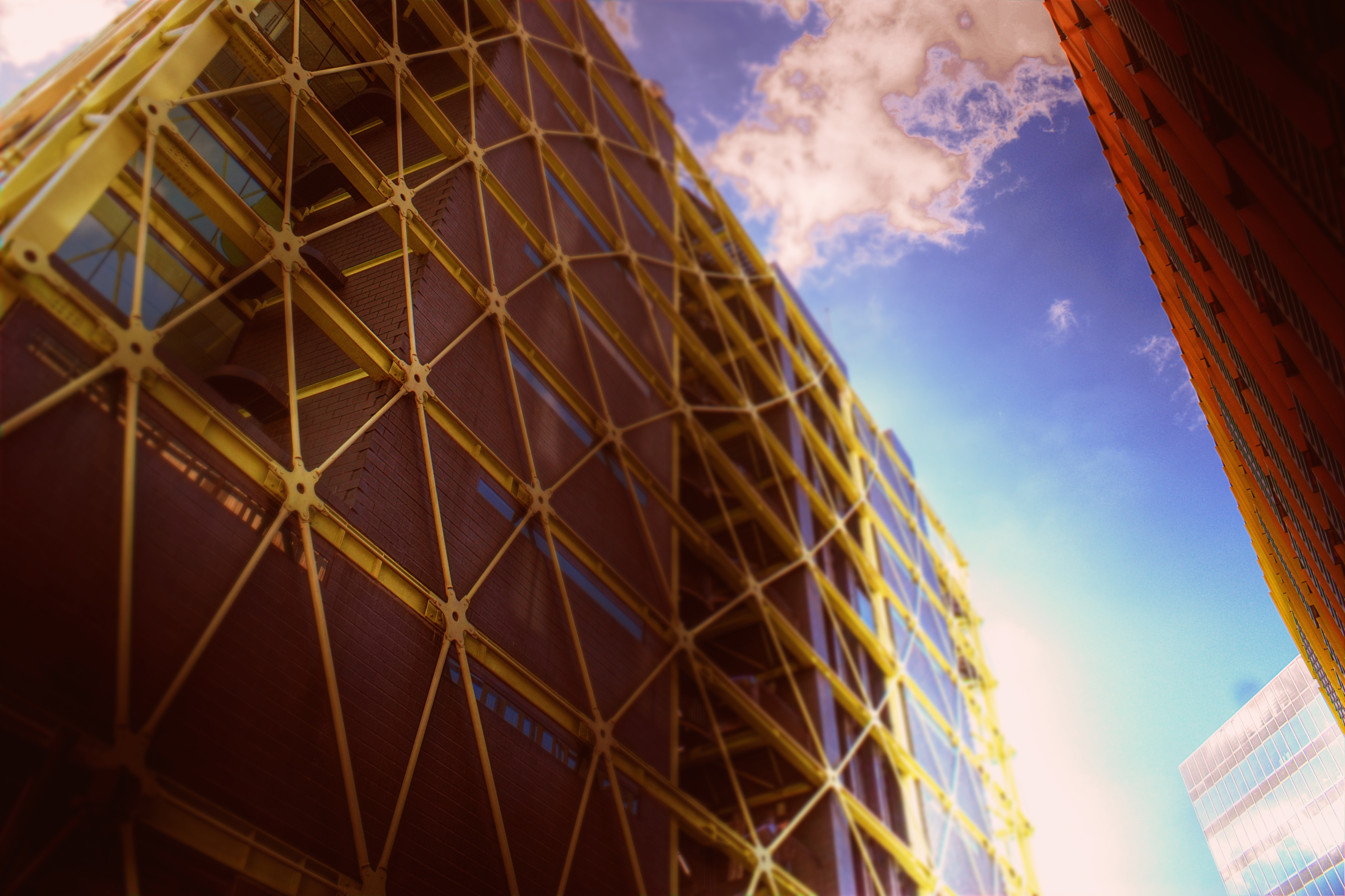
2011 Award winner: World Building of the Year, Category, Completed Buildings: Office (inc mixed use): Media-ICT, Spain, Barcelona by Cloud 9

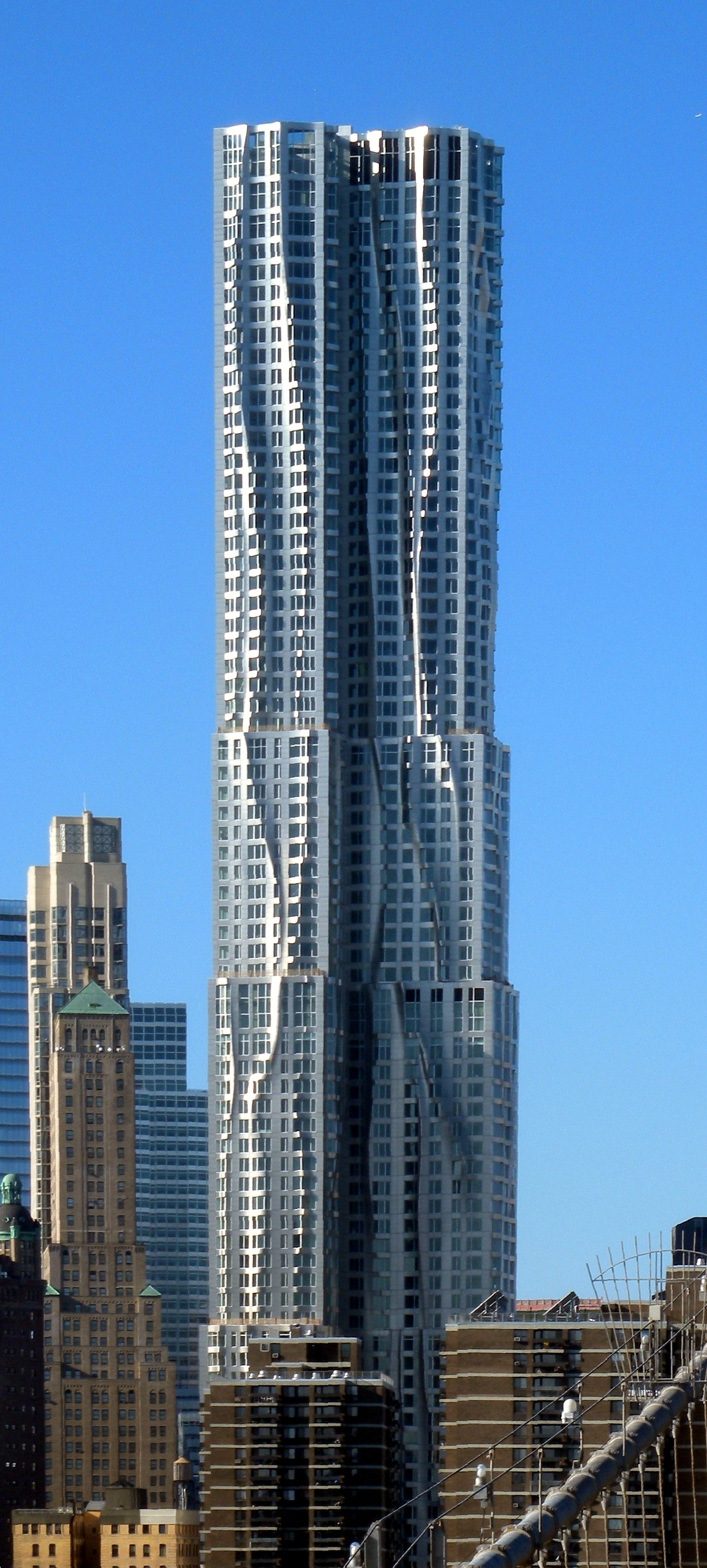
2011 Award winner: Structural Design of the Year, Structural Design - Towers: Eight Spruce Street, United States of America by Gehry Partners, LLP

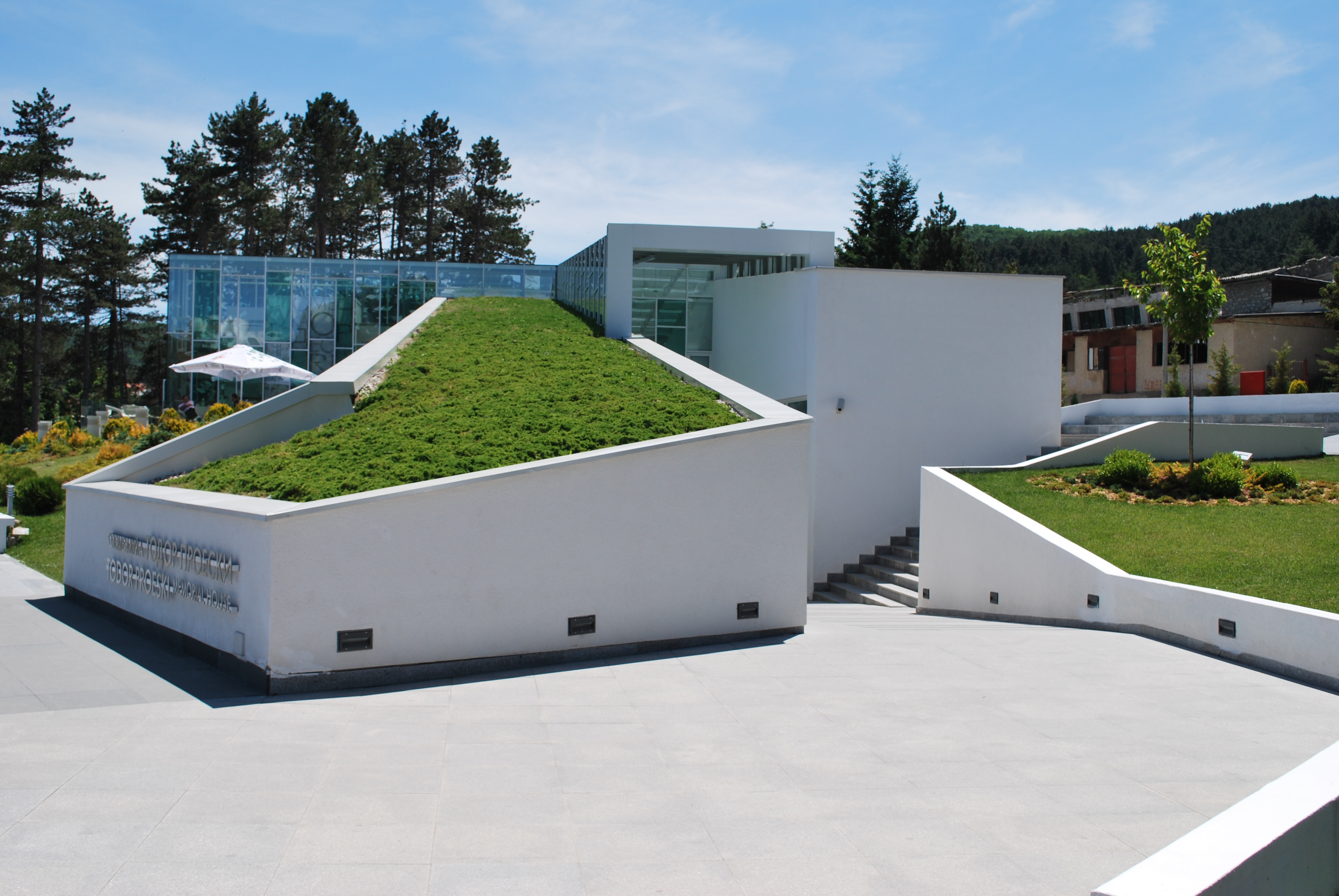
2011 Award winner: People's Choice Award, by OpenBuildings Culture: Memorial house Todor Proeski, Macedonia, Krushevo by Syndicate studio

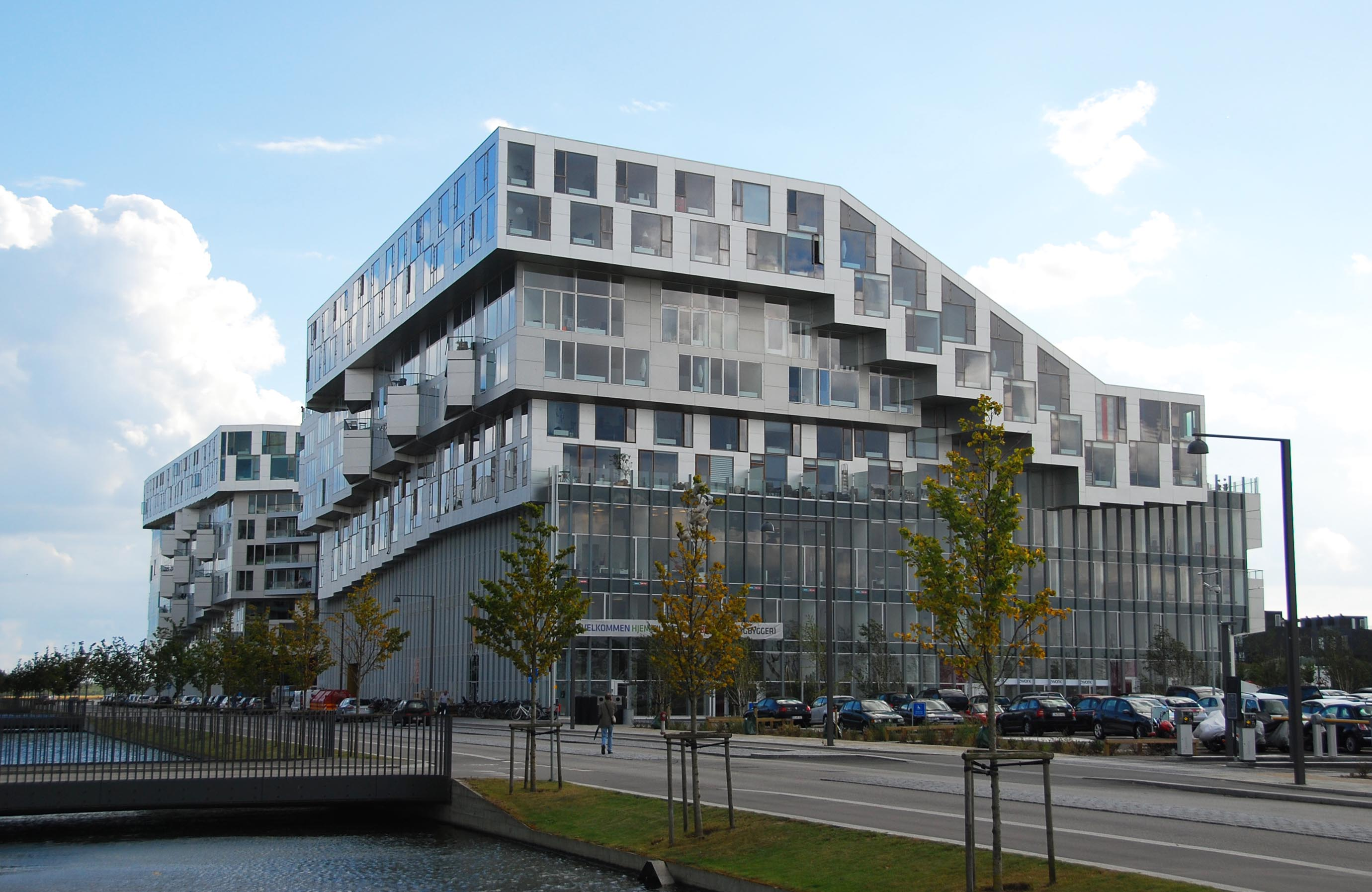
2011 Category Winner, Completed Buildings, Housing (inc mixed use): 8 House, Denmark, Copenhagen by Bjarke Ingels Group

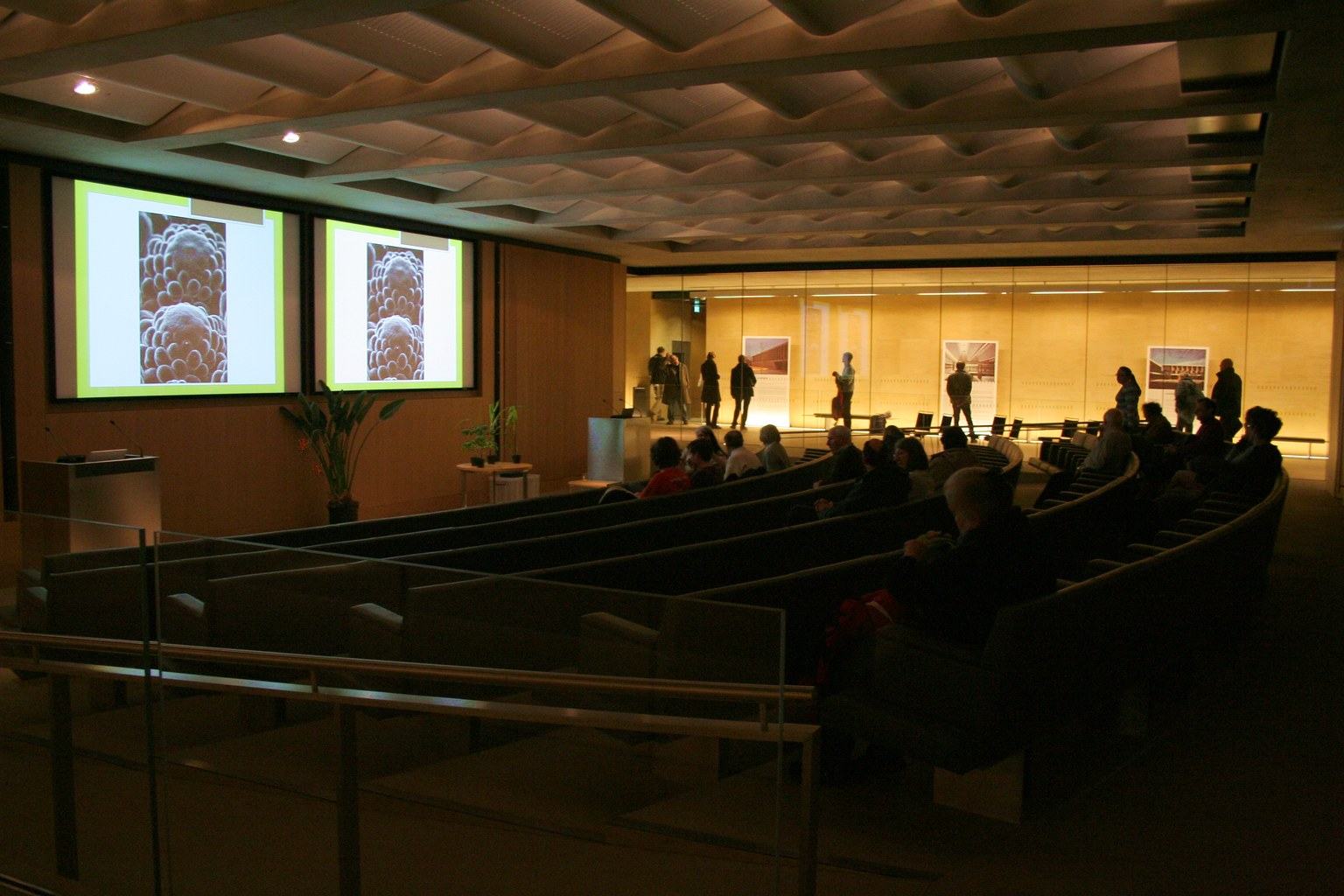
2011 Category Winner, Completed Buildings: Learning: Sainsbury Laboratory, United Kingdom, Cambridge by Stanton Williams

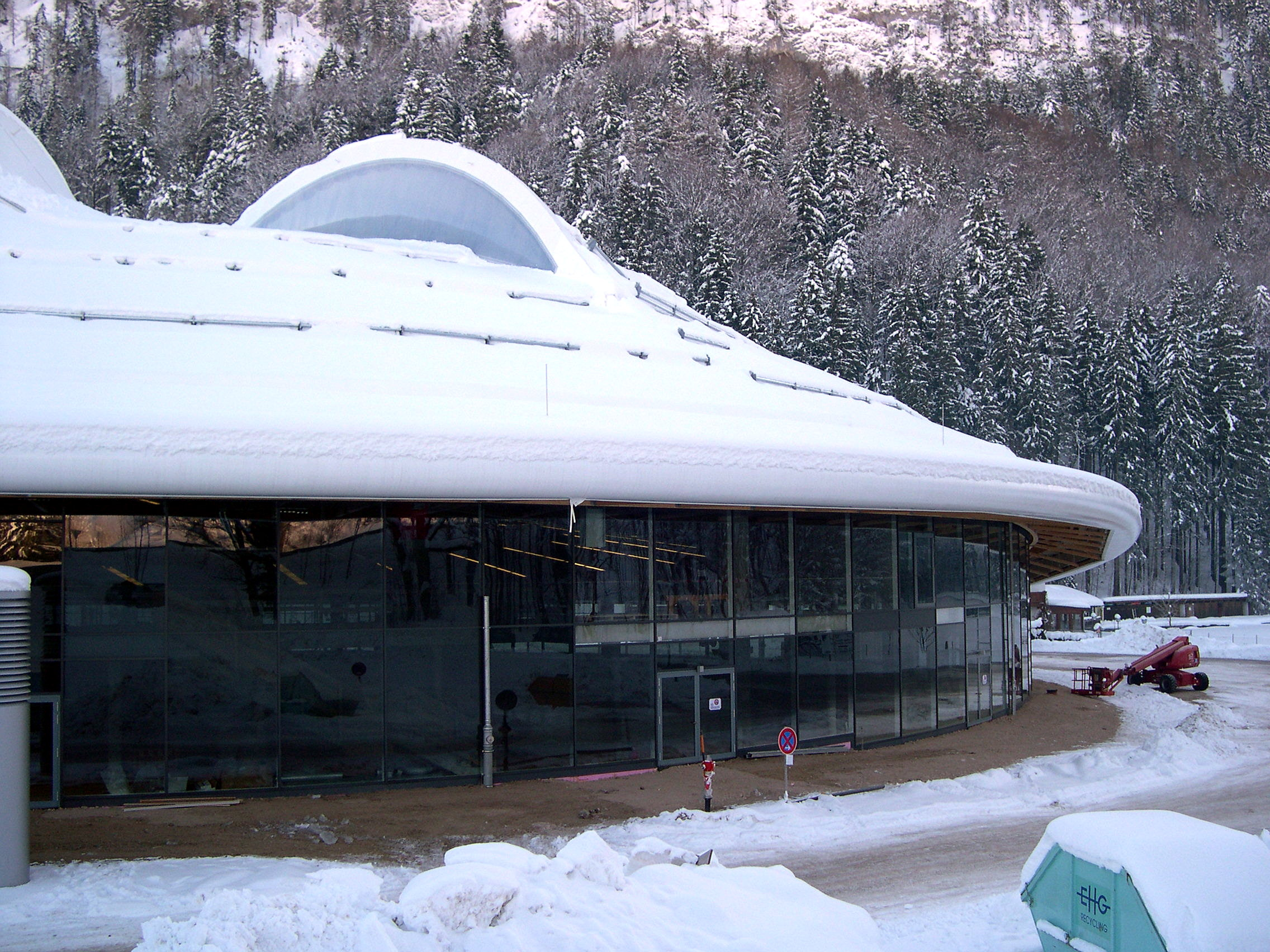
2011 Category Winner, Completed Buildings, Sport: SPEEDSKATING STADIUM INZELL - MAX AICHER ARENA, Germany, Inzell by BEHNISCH Architekten

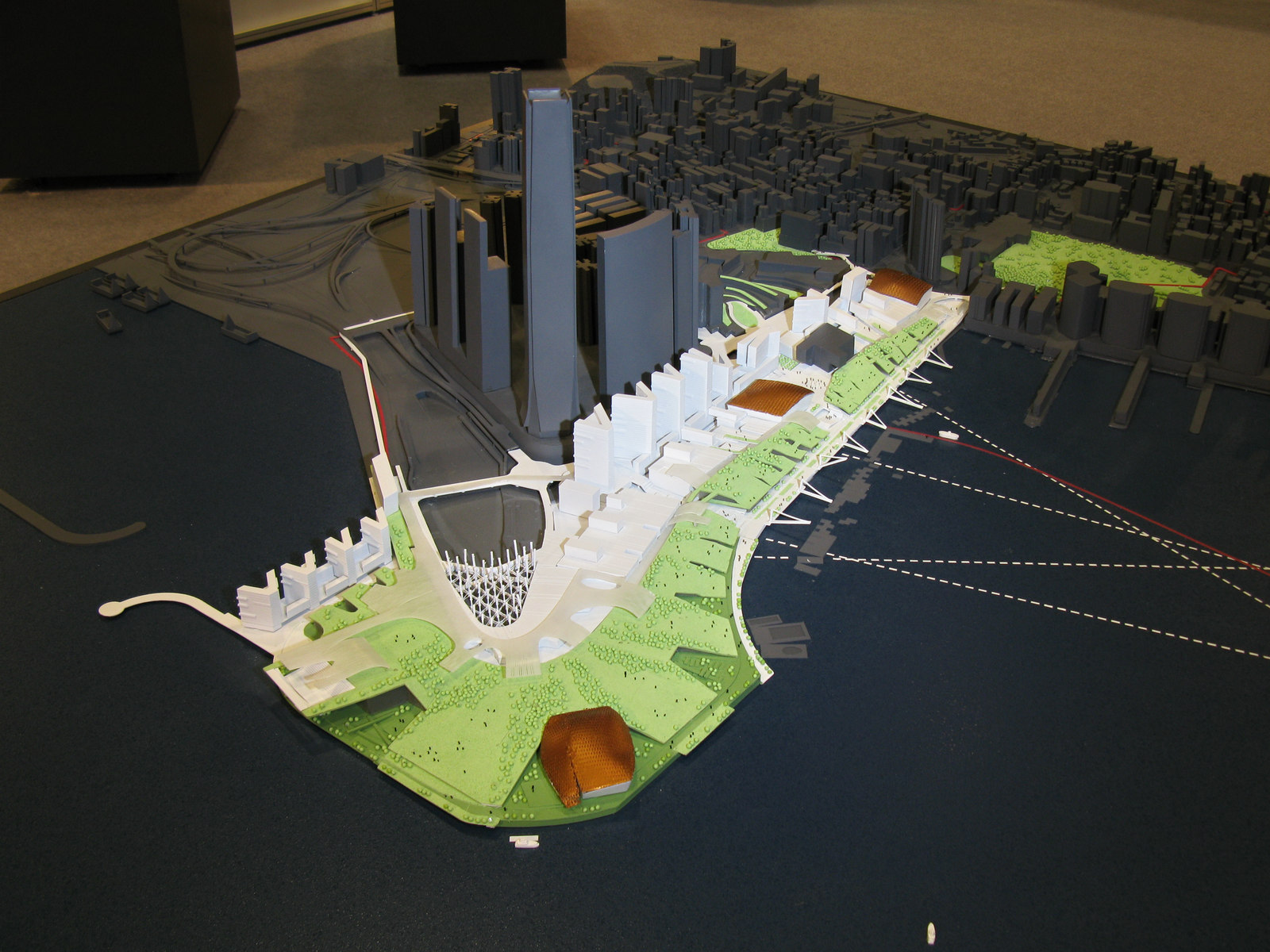
2011 Category Winner, Future Projects, Masterplanning, Future Projects: West Kowloon Cultural District Conceptual Plan, Hong Kong by Rocco Design Architects Ltd

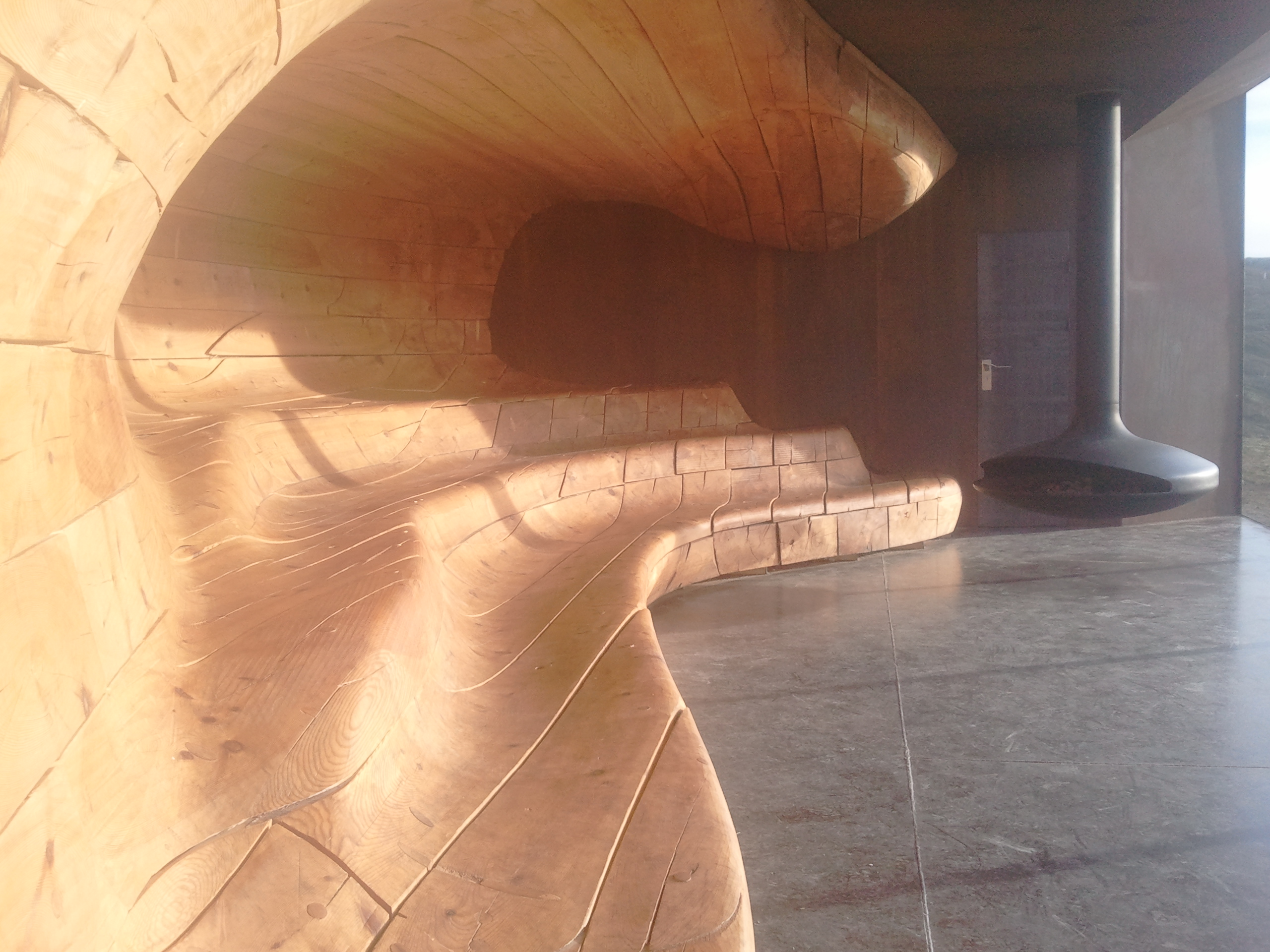
2011 Category Winner, Completed Buildings, Display: Norwegian Wild Reindeer Center Pavilion, Norway, Hjerkinn by Snøhetta

=== The 2012 festival ===
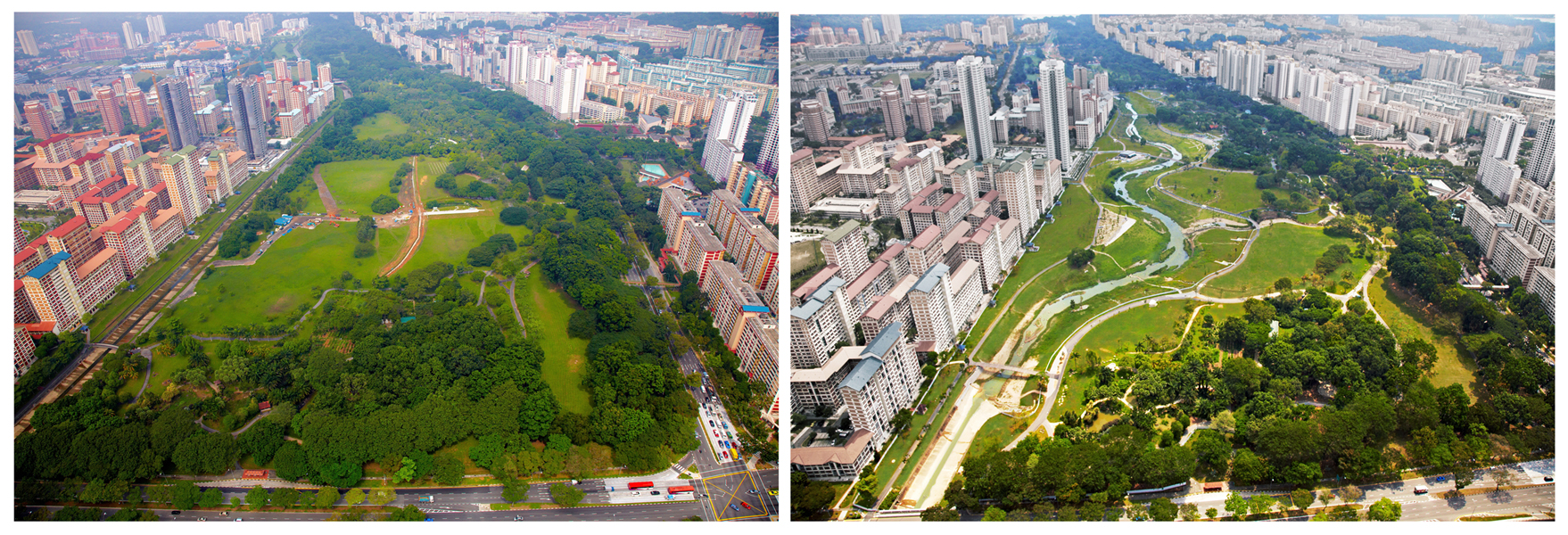
2012 Award winner: Future Project of the Year, Landscape (Projects), urban (Completed designs): Kallang River Bishan Park, Singapore by Atelier Dreiseit

The fifth World Architecture Festival (WAF) was moved to Singapore at Marina Bay Sands and was held from October 3 to 5 2012. The festival awards was nicknamed «The Architectural Oscars» at the time. The World Architecture Festival was at the time the world's largest global architectural awards programme. Paul Finch was director of the festival. There were over 700 entries from more than 60 countries. Awards were given in 33 categories and 301 entries were shortlisted. The competing projects were judged after a presentation during the festival. In the jury choosing the World Building of the Year 2012 were Ben van Berkel, Moshe Safdie, Mok Wei Wei, Jürgen Mayer, Yvonne Farrell, Peter Cook, Kenzo Tange, Sou Fujimoto, Jeanne Gang, Dietrich Ebermarle and Charles Jencks among others. Over 1800 architects, designers and press from more than 60 countries attended. There was some criticism of the list of speakers being white, male, over 40 since of the 44 speakers on the festival 4 were women and 9 Asians.

Awards 2012

- World Building of the Year (Category: Display ) Cooled Conservatories at Gardens by the Bay in Republic of Singapore by Wilkinson Eyre Architects
- Future Project of the Year, Landscape (Category: Landscape (Projects), urban (Completed designs) ) Kallang River Bishan Park in Republic of Singapore by Atelier Dreiseitl
- Future Project of the Year (Category: Masterplanning ) Msheireb - Heart of Doha in Doha, Qatar by AECOM, London (UK), Adjaye Associates (UK), Allies and Morrison (UK), Eric Party Architects (UK), Gensler (USA), HOK (USA), John McAslan and Partners (UK), Mangera Yvars Architects (UK), Mossessian & Partners (UK), Squire & Partners (UK)
- Student Team of the Year (Category: Student Team of the Year) In the Core of Renaissance Architecture by Daniele Pronestì, Daniele Petralia, Stefano Nastasi - University of Ferrara (IT)
- Director's Prize (Category: New and Old ) Plaza España in Adeje in Spain, Tenerife by Menis Arquitectos SLP
- Small Project Award (Category: Transport ) Marina Bay station in Republic of Singapore by Aedas, Quarry Bay & Aedas Pte Ltd (Station Architect)
- Small Project Award (Category: Office ) Office for an Advertising Film Production Company in India, Bangalore by SJK Architects

Gallery of some of the 2012 winners

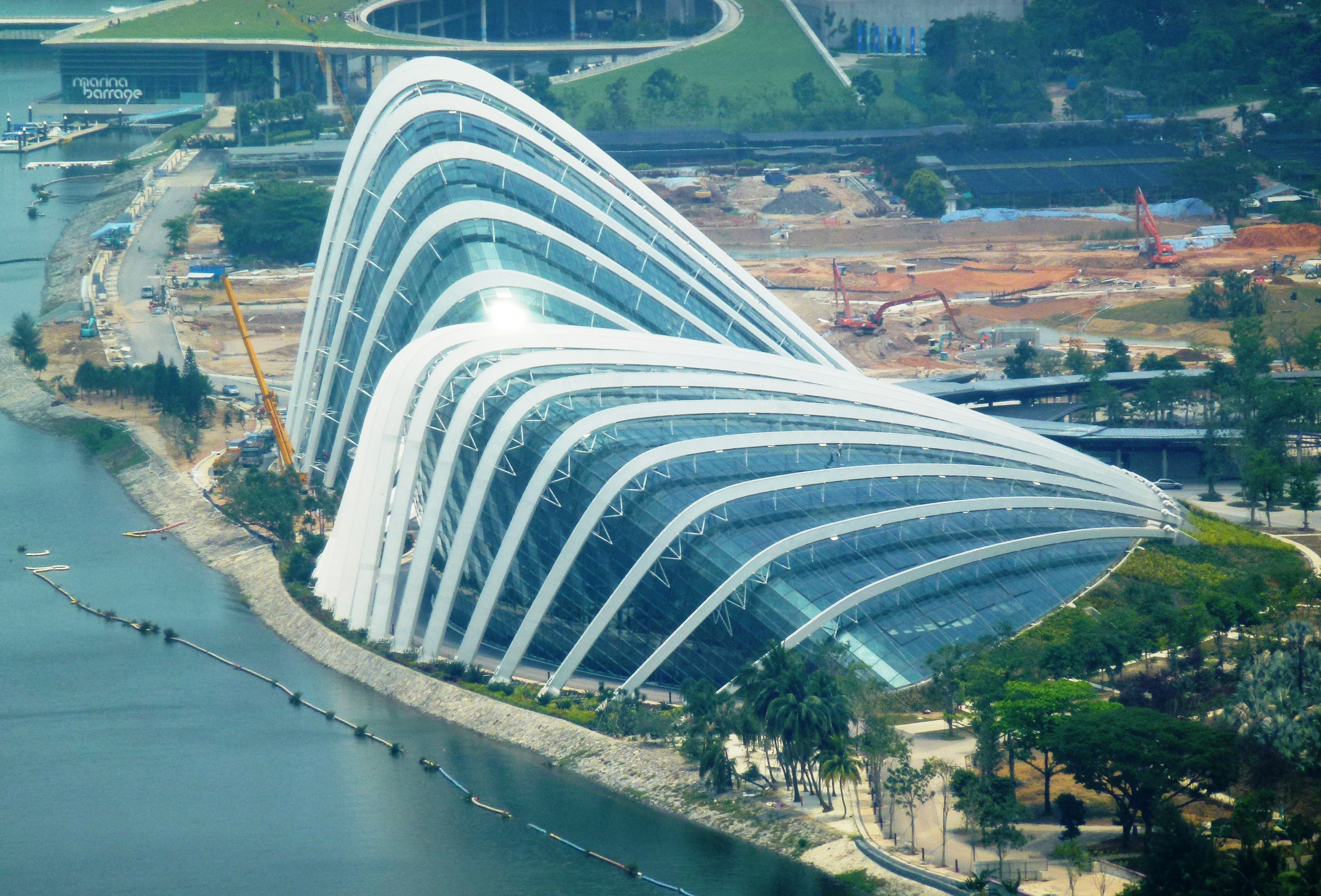
2012 Award winner: World Building of the Year, Display: Cooled Conservatories at Gardens by the Bay, Singapore, Republic of by Wilkinson Eyre Architects

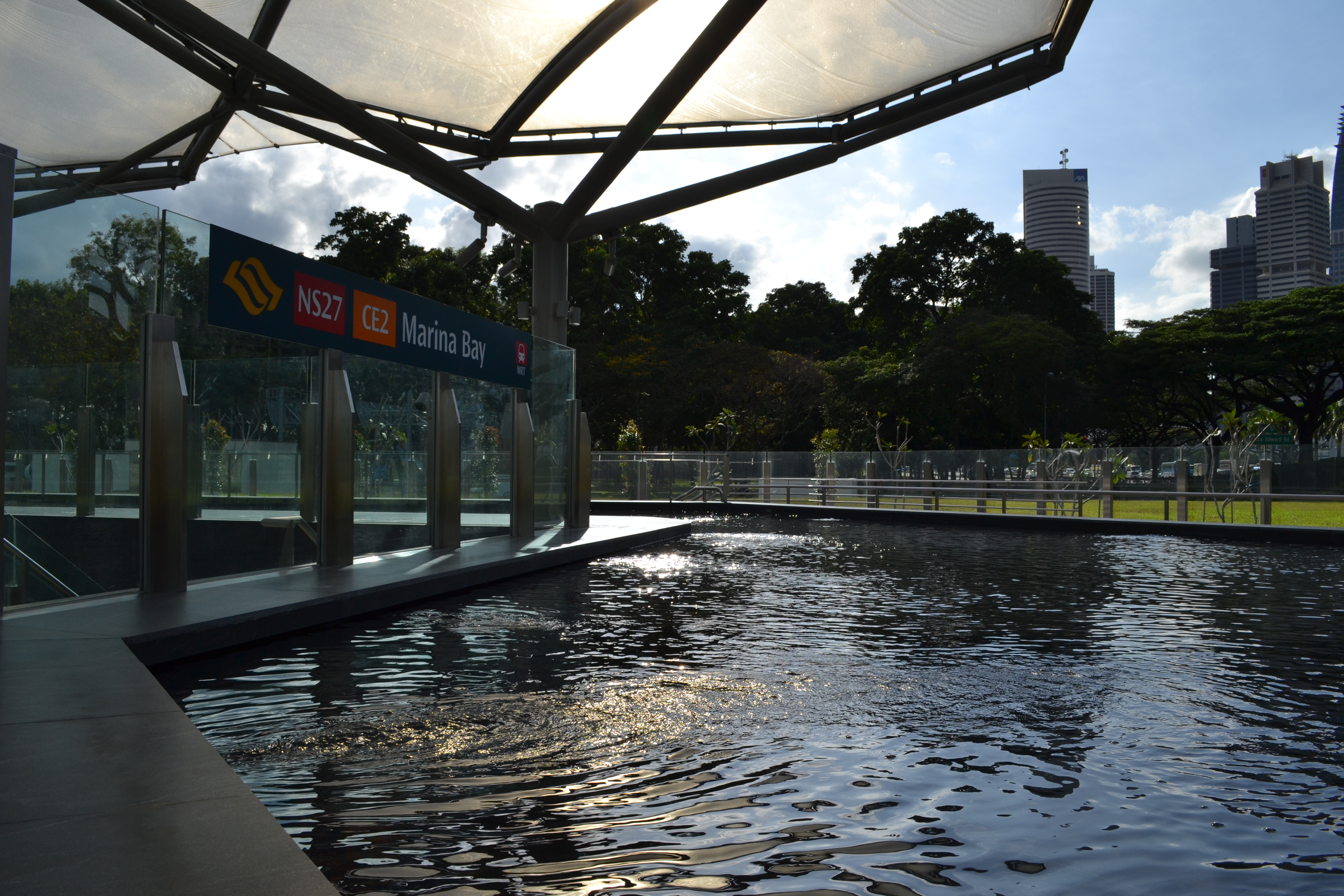
2012 Award winner: Small Project Award, Transport: Marina Bay station, Singapore, Republic of by Aedas, Quarry Bay & Aedas Pte Ltd (Station Architect)

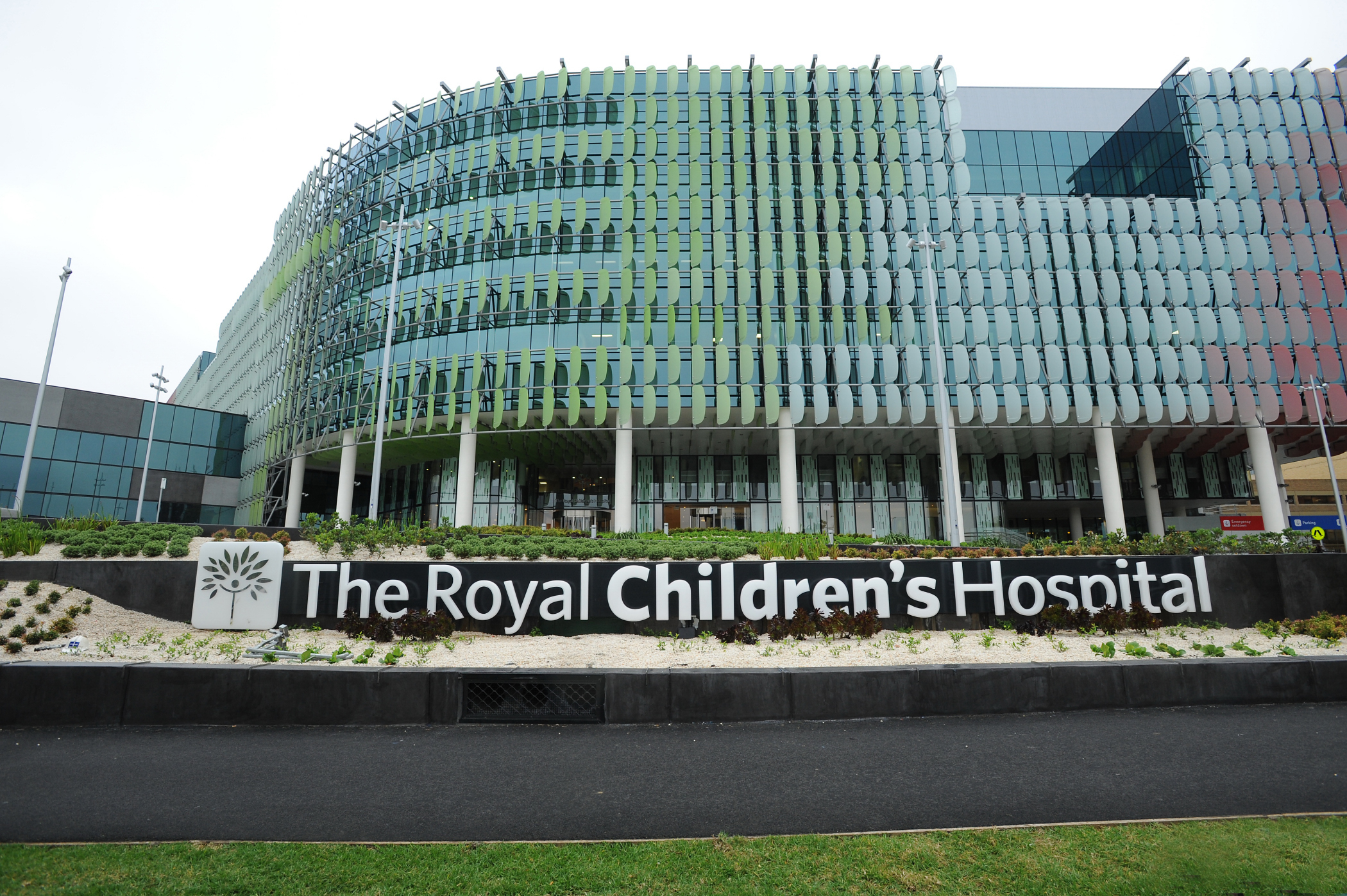
2012 Category Winner, Completed Buildings, Health: The Royal Children's Hospital, Australia, Melbourne by Billiard Leece Partnership and Bates Smart

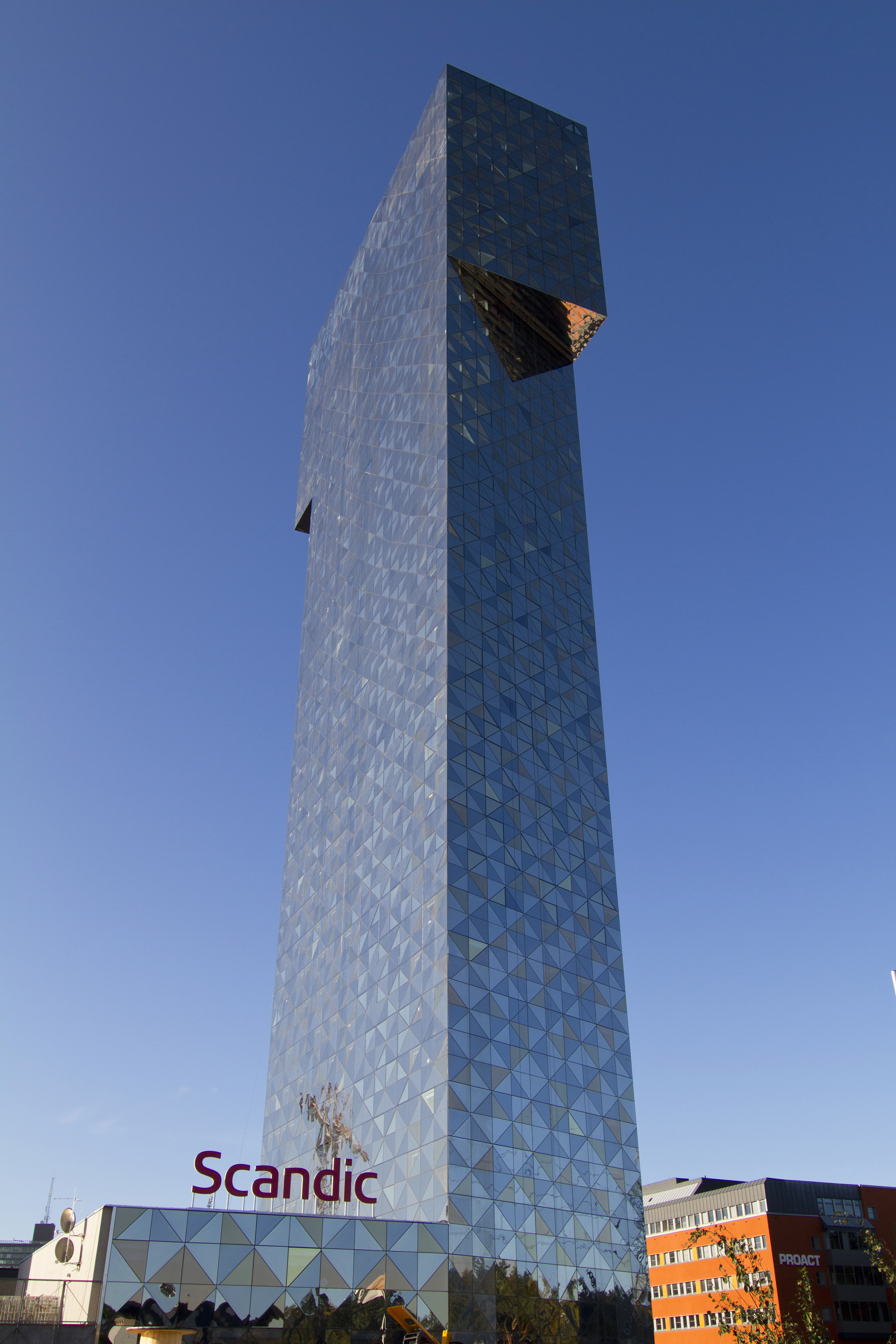
2012 Category Winner, Completed Buildings, Hotel/leisure: Victoria Tower, Sweden, Kista by Wingårdh Arkitektkontor AB N/A

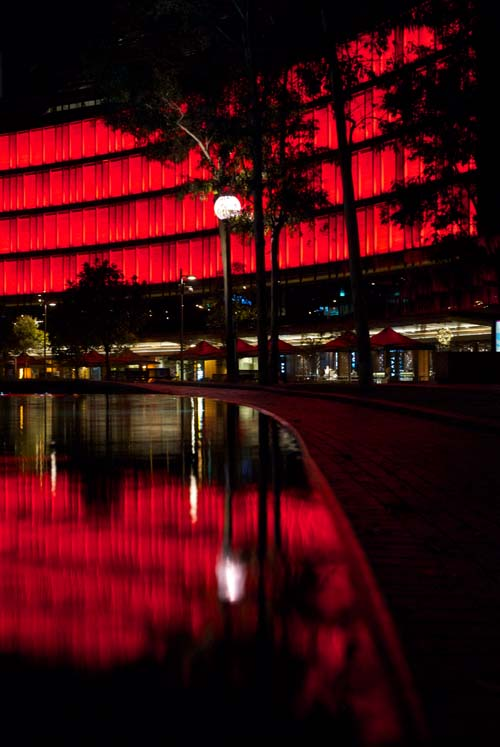
2012 Category Winner, Completed Buildings, Office: Darling Quarter, Australia, Sydney by Francis-Jones Morehen Thorp & FJMT

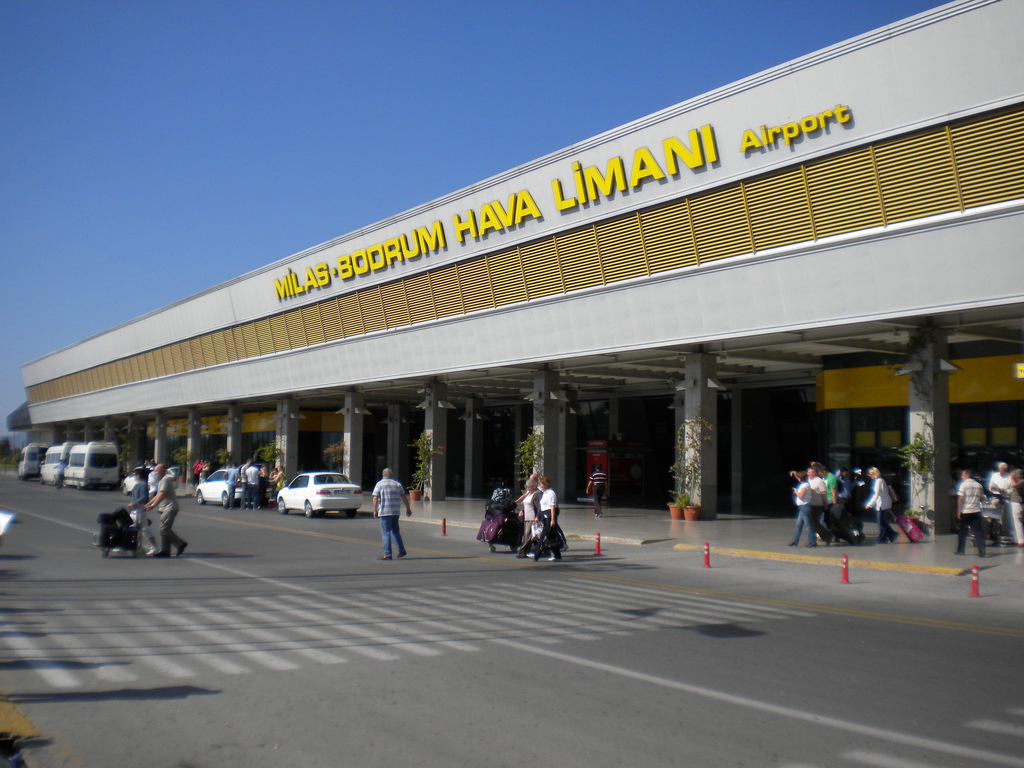
2012 Category Winner, Completed Buildings, Transport: Bodrum International Airport, Turkey by tabanlioglu architects

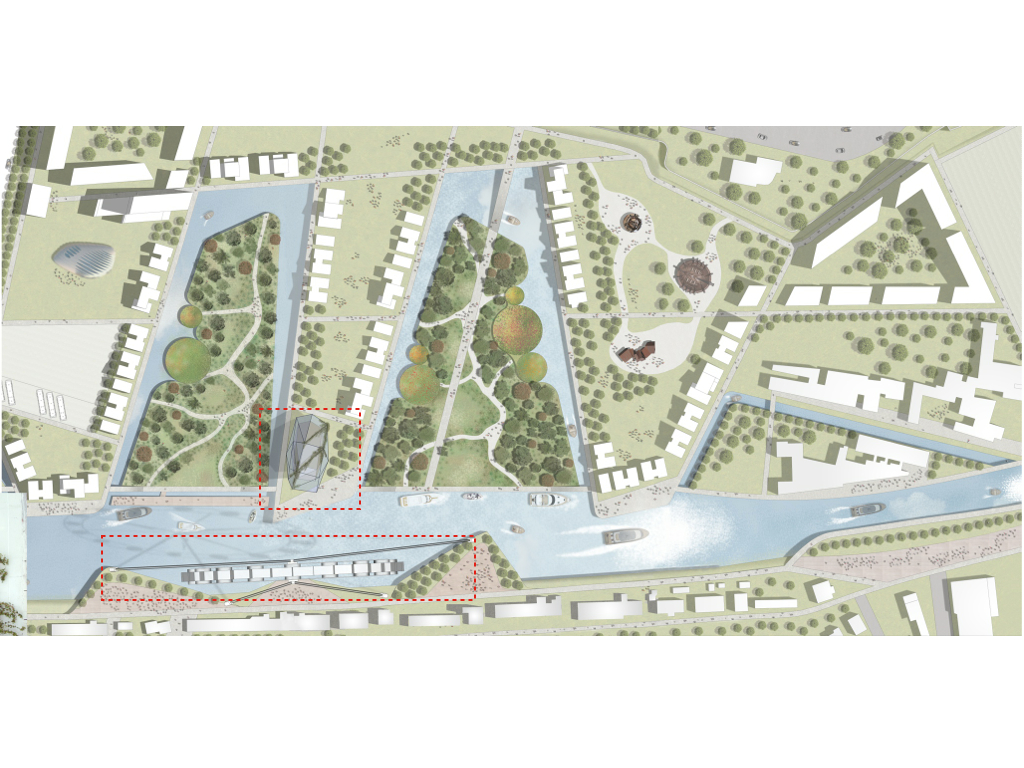
2012 Award winner: Student Team of the Year from University of Ferrara in Italy: In the Core of Renaissance Architecture, Italy, Ferrara

=== The 2013 festival ===
The sixth annual WAF was held in Singapore at Marina Bay Sands from 2 to 4 October 2013. It was attended by over 2,100 architects and designers from 68 countries. WAF was collocated with INSIDE World Festival of Interiors. The entries competed in 29 award categories across three category groups of completed buildings, landscape projects and future projects:

- Completed Buildings: Civic and community, Culture, Display, Health, Higher education/research, Hotel/leisure, House, Housing, New and Old, Office, Production/energy/recycling, Religion, Schools, Shopping, Sport, Transport and Villa.
- Landscape Projects: Completed designs - urban.
- Future Projects: Commercial mixed-use, Competition entries, Culture, Education, Experimental, Health, House, Infrastructure, Leisure led development, Masterplanning, Office and Residential.

More than 300 projects from 50 countries made the official 2013 shortlist. The festival's organiser's were i2i Events Group.

The super-jury included Ken Yeang, Patrick Bellew, Jeanne Gang, Dietmar Eberle and Ken Tadashi Oshima.

Awards 2013

- World Building of the Year (Categories: Culture, Culture - Galleries) Auckland Art Gallery in New Zealand by Francis-Jones Morehen Thorp, fjmt + Archimedia - Architects in Association.
- Future Project of the Year (Categories: Future projects competition and Future projects culture) National Maritime Museum of China by Cox Rayner Architects.
- INSIDE World Interior of the Year: Carrer Avinyó, Barcelona, Spain by David Kohn Architects

Gallery of some of the 2013 winners

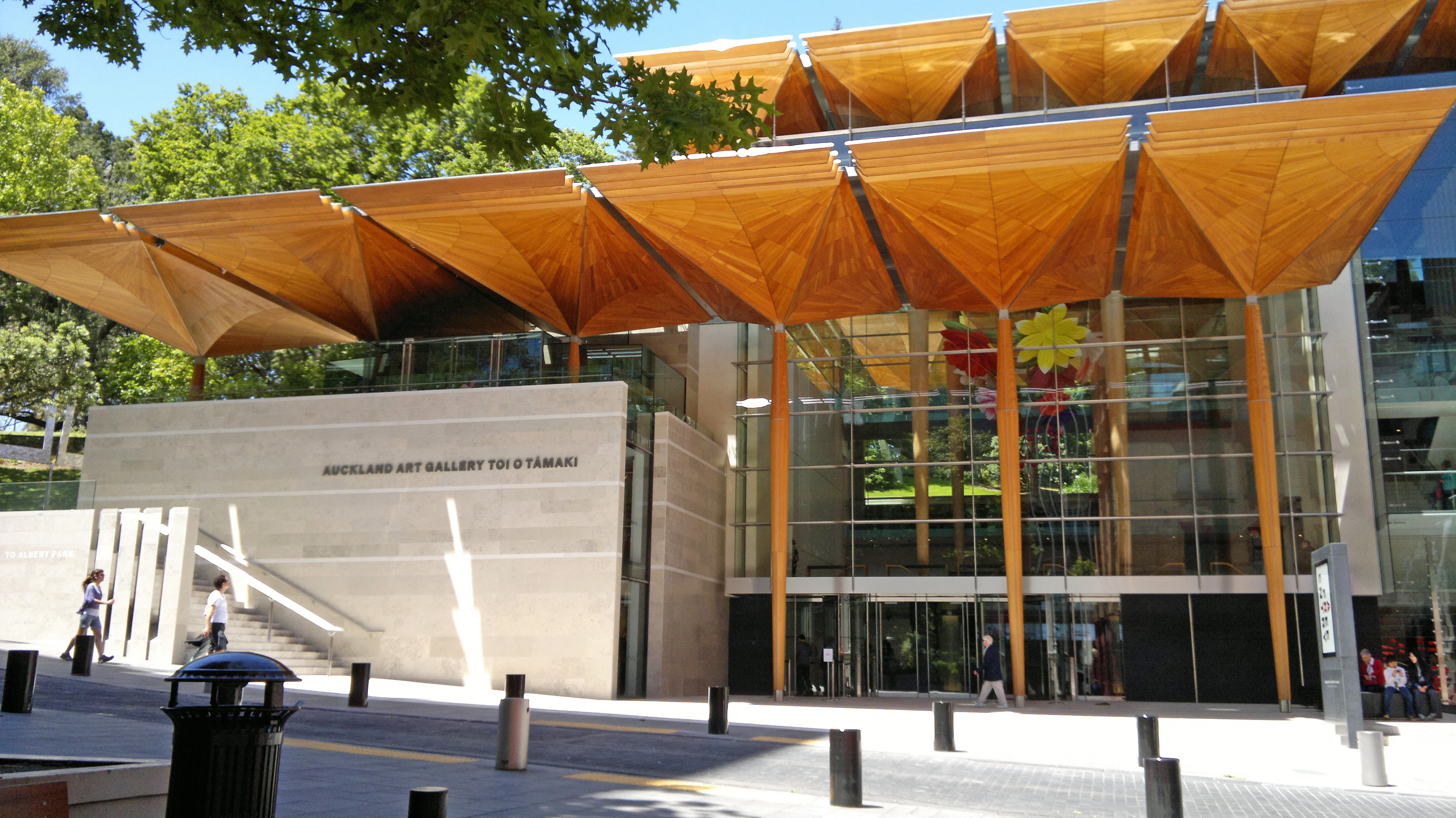
2013 World Building of the Year Culture & Culture - Galleries: Auckland Art Gallery, New Zealand by Francis-Jones Morehen Thorp + Archimedia - Architects in Association

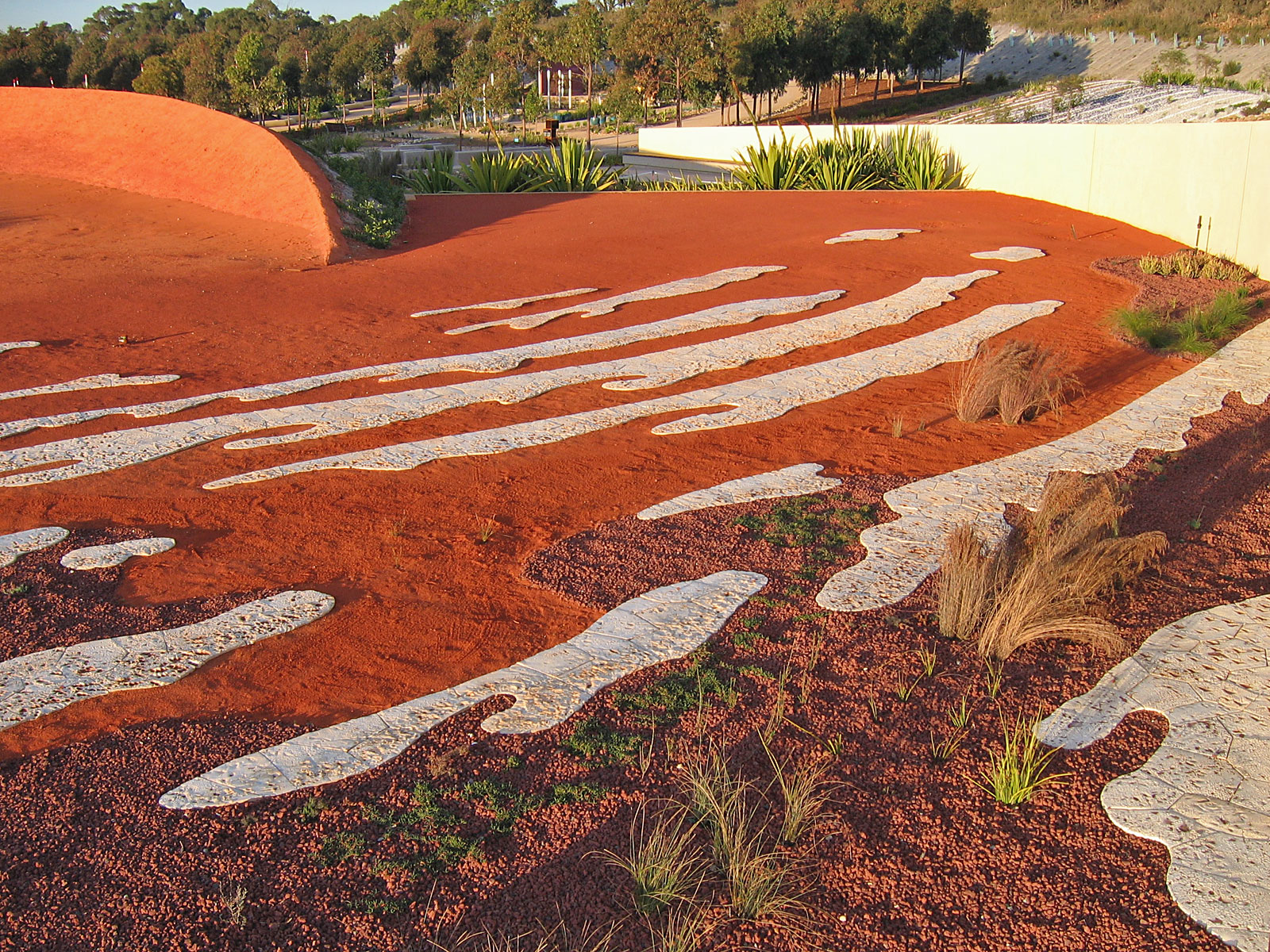
Landscape Projects - Completed designs Category winner: The Australian Garden, Cranbourne by Taylor Cullity Lethlean + Paul Thompson

=== The 2014 festival ===
The seventh annual WAF was held in Singapore at Marina Bay Sands from 1 to 3 October 2014. The event had more than 2000 attendees.

Awards 2014

- World Building of the Year Winner: the Chapel / Vietnam / a21studio
- Completed Buildings:
  - House (sponsored by Grohe) House for Trees / Vietnam / Vo Trong Nghia Architects
  - Housing (sponsored by Grohe) The Carve / Norway / A-Lab
- Office: Liberty Place / Australia / Francis-Jones Morehen Thorp
- Higher Education & Research: Dalarna Media Library / Sweden / ADEPT
- Display: Te Kaitaka 'The Cloak' / New Zealand / Fearon Hay Architects
- Schools: Chobham Academy / UK/ Allford Hall Monaghan Morris
- Shopping: Yalikavak Marina Complex / Turkey / EAA-Emre Arolat Architects
- Religion: La Ascension del Señor Church / Spain / AGi architects
- New and Old: Rethinking the Split House / China / Neri&Hu Design and Research Office
- Civic & Community: the Chapel / Vietnam / a21studio
- Culture: Danish Maritime Museum / Denmark / BIG - Bjarke Ingels Group
- Hotel and Leisure: Son La Restaurant / Vietnam / Vo Trong Nghia Architects
- Villa: Dune House / New Zealand / Fearon Hay Architects
- Production Energy and Recycling: Lune de Sang Sheds / Australia / CHROFI
- Sport: Singapore Sports Hub / Singapore / Singapore Sports Hub Design Team
- Transport: Scale Lane Bridge / UK / McDowell+Benedetti

=== The 2015 festival ===
The eight annual WAF was held in Singapore at Suntec Convention & Exhibition Centre from 4 to 6 November 2015.

- World Building of the Year: The Interlace, by Office for Metropolitan Architecture
- Future Project of the Year: Vancouver House, by Bjarke Ingels Group
- Landscape of the Year: Yanweizhou Park
- Small Project Prize: Lidingövallen
- AkzoNobel's Prize for Colour in Exterior Architecture: ONS INCEK Showroom & Sales Office
- Student Charrette Winner: School of Planning and Architecture, Bhopal
- Religion Winner: Qatar Faculty of Islamic Studies, Education City, Doha by Mangera Yvars Architects
- Experimental – Future Projects: Homefarm by Spark

=== The 2016 festival ===
The ninth annual WAF was held in Berlin, Germany from 16 to 18 November 2016.

- World Building of the Year: National Museum in Szczecin - Dialogue Centre Przełomy, Szczecin, Poland by KWK Promes
- INSIDE World Interior of the Year: Black Cant System - Heike fashion brand concept store, Hangzhou, China by AN Design
- Future Project of the Year: South Melbourne Primary School, Melbourne, Australia by Hayball
- Landscape of the Year: Kopupaka Reserve, Auckland, New Zealand by Isthmus
- Small Project of the Year: The Chinese University of Hong Kong School of Architecture, ZCB Bamboo Pavilion, Kowloon Bay, Hong Kong
- Civic and Community Award: The Library at Willesden Green
- Experimental – Future Projects: Spark Beach Hut by Spark

=== The 2017 festival ===
The tenth annual WAF was held in Berlin, Germany from 15 to 17 November 2017.

- World Building of the Year: Chinese University of Hong Kong, Post-earthquake reconstruction/demonstration project of Guangming Village, Zhaotong, China
- INSIDE World Interior of the Year: Produce.Workshop, Fabricwood, Singapore
- Future Project of the Year: Allen Jack+Cottier Architects and NH Architecture, Sydney Fish Markets, Sydney, Australia
- Landscape of the Year: Turenscape, Peasants and their Land: The Recovered Archaeological Landscape of Chengtoushan, Lixian County, China
- Small Project of the Year: Eriksson Furunes + Leandro V. Locsin Partners + Jago Boase, Streetlight Tagpuro, Tacloban, Philippines
- Completed Buildings:
  - House: Vo Trong Nghia Architects, Binh House, Ho Chi Minh City, Vietnam
  - Housing: Marc Koehler Architects, Superlofts Houthaven, Amsterdam, Netherlands
  - Production, Energy & Recycling: Slash Architects and Arkizon Architects, The Farm of 38-30, Afyonkarahisar, Turkey
  - Sport: HKS, U.S. Bank Stadium, Minneapolis, United States of America
  - School: Andrew Burges Architects, East Sydney Early Learning Centre, Sydney, Australia
  - Civic & Community: Eriksson Furunes + Leandro V. Locsin Partners + Jago Boase, Streetlight Tagpuro, Tacloban, Philippines
  - Culture: Heneghan Peng Architects, The Palestinian Museum, Birzeit, Palestine
  - Office: Nikken Sekkei, Co Op Kyosai Plaza, Tokyo, Japan
  - New & Old: The Chinese University of Hong Kong, Post-earthquake reconstruction/demonstration project of Guangming Village, Zhaotong, China
  - Display: Alison Brooks Architects, The Smile, London, United Kingdom
  - Transport: Grüntuch Ernst Architects, Transformation Chemnitz Central Station, Chemnitz, Germany
  - Hotel & Leisure: Cong Sinh Architects, Vegetable Trellis, Ho Chi Minh City, Vietnam
  - Shopping: ACME, Victoria Gate, Leeds, United Kingdom
  - Health: Ntsika Architects, Westbury Clinic, Johannesburg, South Africa
  - Mixed Use: Allford Hall Monaghan Morris, Westminster Bridge Road, London, United Kingdom
  - Religion: Waugh Thistleton Architects, Bushey Cemetery, Bushey, United Kingdom
  - Higher Education & Research: C.F. Møller Architects, Maersk Tower, Copenhagen, Denmark
  - Villa: Irving Smith Architects, Bach with Two Roofs, Golden Bay, New Zealand

=== The 2018 festival ===
The eleventh annual WAF was held in Amsterdam, Netherlands from 28 to 30 November 2018.

- World Building of the Year: WOHA Architects - Kampung Admiralty, Singapore, Singapore
- Future Project of the Year: Sebastian Monsalve + Juan David Hoyos - Medellin River Parks / Botanical Park Master Plan, Medellin, Colombia
- INSIDE World Interior of the Year: JAC studios - Yumin Art Nouveau Collection, Phoenix Jeju, South Korea
- Landscape of the Year: Batlle i Roig Arquitectura - Pedestrian Path along the Gypsum Mines, Barcelona, Spain
- Small Project of the Year: Camilo Moraes - Piedras Bayas Beachcamp / Atacama Desert, Chile
- The Amsterdam Prize: Benthem Crouwel Architects - North South Line / Amsterdam, Netherlands
- Glass Future Prize: Studio Gang - Tour Montparnasse, Paris, France
- Completed Buildings:
  - House: David Leech Architects - A house in a garden - 81 Hollybrook Grove, Dublin, Ireland
  - Small Scale Housing: Allford Hall Monaghan Morris - Weston Street, London, United Kingdom Completed Buildings
  - Large Scale Housing: SANJAY PURI ARCHITECTS - The Street, Mathura, India
  - Production, Energy & Recycling: Parviainen Architects - Länsisalmi Power Station, Vantaa, Finland
  - Sport: Koffi & Diabaté Architectes - Gymnasium, Blaise Pascal High School, Abidjan, Ivory Coast
  - School: Tezuka Architects - Muku Nursery School - Fuji City, Japan
  - Civic & Community: CHROFI with McGregor Coxall - Maitland Riverlink, Maitland, Australia
  - Culture: Conrad Gargett - The Piano Mill, Stanthorpe, Australia
  - Office: INNOCAD Architecture - C&P Corporate Headquarters, Graz, Austria
  - New & Old: Heatherwick Studio - Zeitz MOCAA, Cape Town, South Africa
  - Display: Arkitema Architects and Professor Christoffer Harlang - Hammershus Visitor Centre, Allinge, Denmark
  - Transport: Grimshaw - London Bridge station, London, United Kingdom
  - Hotel & Leisure: SeARCH - Hotel Jakarta, Amsterdam, Netherlands
  - Shopping: NIKKEN SEKKEI - Shanghai Greenland Center / Greenland Being Funny - Shanghai, China
  - Health: Temporary association AAPROG – BOECKX. – B2Ai - Hospital AZ Zeno, Knokke, Belgium
  - Mixed Use: WOHA Architects - Kampung Admiralty, Singapore, Singapore
  - Religion: Spheron Architects - Belarusian Memorial Chapel, London, United Kingdom
  - Higher Education & Research: Alison Brooks Architects - Exeter College Cohen Quadrangle, Oxford, United Kingdom
  - Villa: KieranTimberlake - High Horse Ranch, Northern California, United States of America
- Future Buildings:
  - Civic: BAAD Studio - The Sunken Shrine of Our Lady of Lourdes of Cabetican, Bacolor, Philippines
  - Commercial Mixed-use: Aedas - Taichung Commercial Bank Headquarters Mixed-Use Project, Taiwan
  - Competition Entries: Nextoffice - Sadra Civic Center, Sadra, Iran
  - Culture: Studio 44 Architects - Museum of the siege of Leningrad, St. Petersburg, Russia
  - Education: Warren and Mahoney Architects with Woods Bagot - Lincoln University and AgResearch Joint Facility, Christchurch, New Zealand
  - Experimental : KANVA - Imago, Montreal, Canada
  - Health : Allford Hall Monaghan Morris - The Alder Centre, Liverpool, United Kingdom
  - House : Nextoffice - Guyim Vault House, Shiraz, Iran
  - Infrastructure: Monk Mackenzie + Novare – Thiruvalluvar, Kanyakumari, India
  - Leisure Led Development : BIG-Bjarke Ingels Group - Audemars Piguet Hôtel des Horlogers, Le Brassus, Switzerland
  - Masterplanning : Sebastian Monsalve + Juan David Hoyos - Medellin River Parks / Botanical Park Master Plan, Medellin, Colombia
  - Office: 3XN Architects - Olympic House - International Olympic Committee HQ, Lausanne, Switzerland
  - Residential: Sordo Madaleno Arquitectos - Amelia Tulum, Tulum, Mexico

=== The 2023 Festival ===
- World Building of the Year: Huizhen High School, China by Approach Design Studio/Zhejiang University of Technology Engineering Design Group
- Future Project of the Year: The Probiotic Tower, Egypt by Design and More International
- World Interior of the Year: 19 Waterloo Street, Australia by SJB
- Landscape of the Year: Benjakitti Forest Park: Transforming a Brownfield into an Urban Ecological Sanctuary, Thailand by TURENSCAPE, Arsom silp Community and Environmental Architect

==== Completed Buildings ====
Award Winners of the 'Completed Buildings' Category
Category	Project	Architect/ Architecture Firm/ Company	Country
Civic and Community	Reyhanli Centre for World Citizens	Chen-Yu Chiu and the team of Studio Cho	Taiwan
Creative Re-Use	Kaomai Museums and Tea Barn	PAVA architects	Thailand
Culture	Ravenscar House	Patterson Associates Architects	New Zealand
Display	Turrell Pavilion	Studio mk27	Maldives
Health	Victorian Heart Hospital	Conrad Gargett (now merged with Architectus) + Wardle	Australia
Higher Education + Research	Boola Katitjin	Lyons with Silver Thomas Hanley, Officer Woods, The Fulcrum Agency and Aspect Studios	Australia
Hotels + Leisure	Lanserhof Sylt	ingenhoven associates gmbh	Germany
House + Villa	Veil House,	5468796 Architecture	Canada
Housing	547 West 47th Street - The West Residential	concrete amsterdam	United States
Mixed Use	Battersea Power Station Phase Two	WilkinsonEyre	United Kingdom
Office	Surat Diamond Bourse	Morphogenesis	India
Production + Energy + Logistics	The Courtyard CCR Lab	Sanjay Puri Architects	India
Religion	Santa Maria Goretti Church	Mario Cucinella Architects	Italy
Retrofit	Vast Gallery & Artist Residency	Persian Garden Studio	Iran
School	Huizhen High School	Approach Design Studio/Zhejiang University of Technology Engineering Design Group	China
Shopping	Shanghai Suhe MixC World	Kokaistudios	China
Sport	Quzhou Stadium	MAD Architects	China
Transport	Elizabeth line	Grimshaw	United Kingdom

==== Future Buildings ====
Award Winners of the 'Future Buildings' Category
Category	Project	Architect/ Architecture Firm/ Company	Country
Civic	Border Village Community Center	Nextoffice, Studio of Architectural Research & Design	Iran
Commercial Mixed Use	Belgrove House	Allford Hall Monaghan Morris	United Kingdom
Competition entries	Hormuz Eco Resort	Nextoffice, Studio of Architectural Research & Design	Iran
Culture	Osaka Pavilion	Studio mk27	Japan
Education	Resource Recovery Learning Centre	TERROIR	Australia
Experimental	The Probiotic Tower	design and more international	Egypt
Health	Alexandria Health Centre	Warren and Mahoney	Australia
House	DIGGING FOR LIGHT (Ganats villa),	Kalbod Studio	Iran
Infrastructure	Shenzhen Airport East Integrated Transport Hub	Grimshaw	China
Leisure-led development	Shiraz Cultural and Recreational Complex: The Thickened Earth	Nextoffice, Studio of Architectural Research & Design	Iran
Masterplanning	Green City Kigali	Feilden Clegg Bradley Studios	Rwanda

==== Inside ====
Award Winners of the 'Inside' Category
Category	Project	Architect/ Architecture Firm/ Company	Country
Bars + Resautrants	Sage	OFFICE AIO	China
Education			

=== The 2024 Festival ===
- World Building of the Year: Darlington Public School, Sydney, Australia by fjcstudio
- Student Charette Winners: Staging Symbiosis - Rathlin Island Test Kitchen Queen's University Belfast, Ireland, (Team - Oileán Galligan, Hannah Jackson, Oliver Petch, Jake Newman, Phil Kennedy)

== World Buildings Directory ==
The World Buildings Directory (browse directory) hosts the official listing of all past and present projects awarded by WAF.

You can browse/search the directory by these categories:

- ARCHITECT
- WAF YEAR
- AWARD STATUS
- AWARD CATEGORY

== See also ==
- List of World Architecture Festival winners
