= Climate-adaptive building shell =

Architecture that adapts to the environment

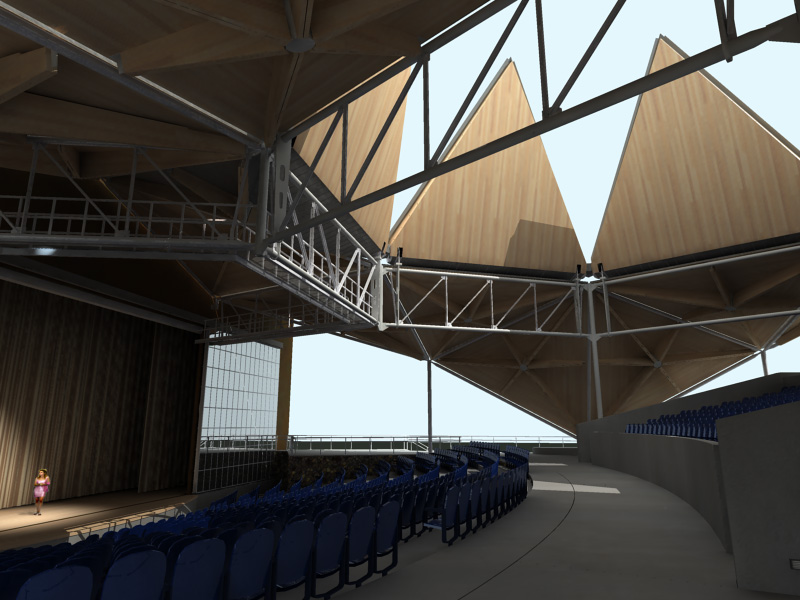
Movable roof of the Bengt Sjostrom Theatre in Rockford, Illinois able to modulate the indoor environmental conditions to maximize the occupants' experience

In building engineering, a climate-adaptive building shell (CABS) is a façade or roof that interacts with the variability of its environment in a dynamic way. Conventional structures have static building envelopes and therefore cannot act in response to changing weather conditions and occupant requirements. Well-designed CABS have two main functions: they contribute to energy-saving for heating, cooling, ventilation, and lighting, and they induce a positive impact on the indoor environmental quality of buildings.

== Definition ==
The description of CABS made by Loonen et al. says that:

A climate adaptive building shell has the ability to repeatedly and reversibly change some of its functions, features or behavior over time in response to changing performance requirements and variable boundary conditions, and does this with the aim of improving overall building performance.

This definition shows several components that conform CABS, and are addressed in this article.

The first part of the definition is related to its fundamental characteristic; being adaptive envelopes, or in other words, having skins that could adjust to new circumstances. This means that envelopes should be able to "alter slightly as to achieve the desired result", "become used to a new situation", and even return to their original stage if needed. Although occupants' desired conditions are indoors, they are affected by the outdoor surroundings. While these outcomes can be broadly defined, there is a consensus that the purpose of CABS is to provide shelter, protection, and a comfortable indoor environmental quality by consuming the minimum amount of energy needed. Therefore, the objective is to improve the well-being and productivity of people inside the building by making it sensitive to its surroundings.

CABS must satisfy different demands that compete or even conflict with each other. For example, they must find the compromise between daylight and glare, fresh air and draft, ventilation and excessive humidity, shutters and luminaires, heat gains and overheating, and others among them. The dynamism of the envelope required to manage these compromises could be accomplished in various ways, for example by moving components, by the introduction of airflows or by a chemical change in a material. However, it is not sufficient to simply add adaptive features to the design or the existing building, they must be integrated into it as a whole system. Therefore, by using CABS technologies, a variety of opportunities are available for a transformation from "manufactured" to "mediated" indoor spaces.

== Related concepts ==
CABS is only one designation for an envelope concept that can be described by a range of different terms. Several variations on the term 'adaptive' can be used, including: active, advanced, dynamic, interactive, kinetic, responsive, intelligent and switchable. In addition, the concepts of responsive architecture, kinetic architecture, intelligent building are closely related. The main difference with CABS is that the adaptation takes place at the building shell level, whereas the other concepts consider a whole-building approach.

== Categorization of CABS ==
Like any other system, CABS have several independent characteristics by which they can be categorized. Therefore, the same CABS may fit somehow into all of these categories. What may be different from one CABS to another is the subcategorization, which discriminates based on the attributes of each one of them. The following are some of the possible categorizations that may be found in the literature.

=== Climate responsive systems ===
As the name says, they are categorized based on the climatic factors they tackle. Their behavior is based on producing a change in heat, light, air, water and/or other types of energy. Thus, they are subcategorized into three types: solar-responsive systems, air-flow-responsive systems, and other natural sources responsive systems.

=== Emerging technologies of Climate Adaptive Curtain Wall ===
A climate-adaptive building curtain wall possesses the ability to repeatedly and reversibly modify its heat transfer characteristics (U-Value and SHGC) in response to evolving performance demands and variable environmental conditions. This adaptation aims to enhance the overall efficiency of the building.

This capability entails the continuous adjustment of the envelope's parameters autonomously, without relying on external power sources. The primary objective is to elevate the comfort and productivity of individuals within the building by enabling the structure to sensitively react to its surroundings. Additionally, an adaptive shell offers energy-saving benefits, technology demonstrates a potential of 30% reduction in total energy consumption.

However, advancing the technology alone is not enough; the new system must also integrate into existing infrastructure. To accomplish this, the system continuously adjusts the thermal properties of the building envelope through internal air circulation within hermetically sealed curtain wall panels. This significantly reduces the carbon footprint of high-rise buildings while improving occupant comfort.

==== Solar responsive systems ====
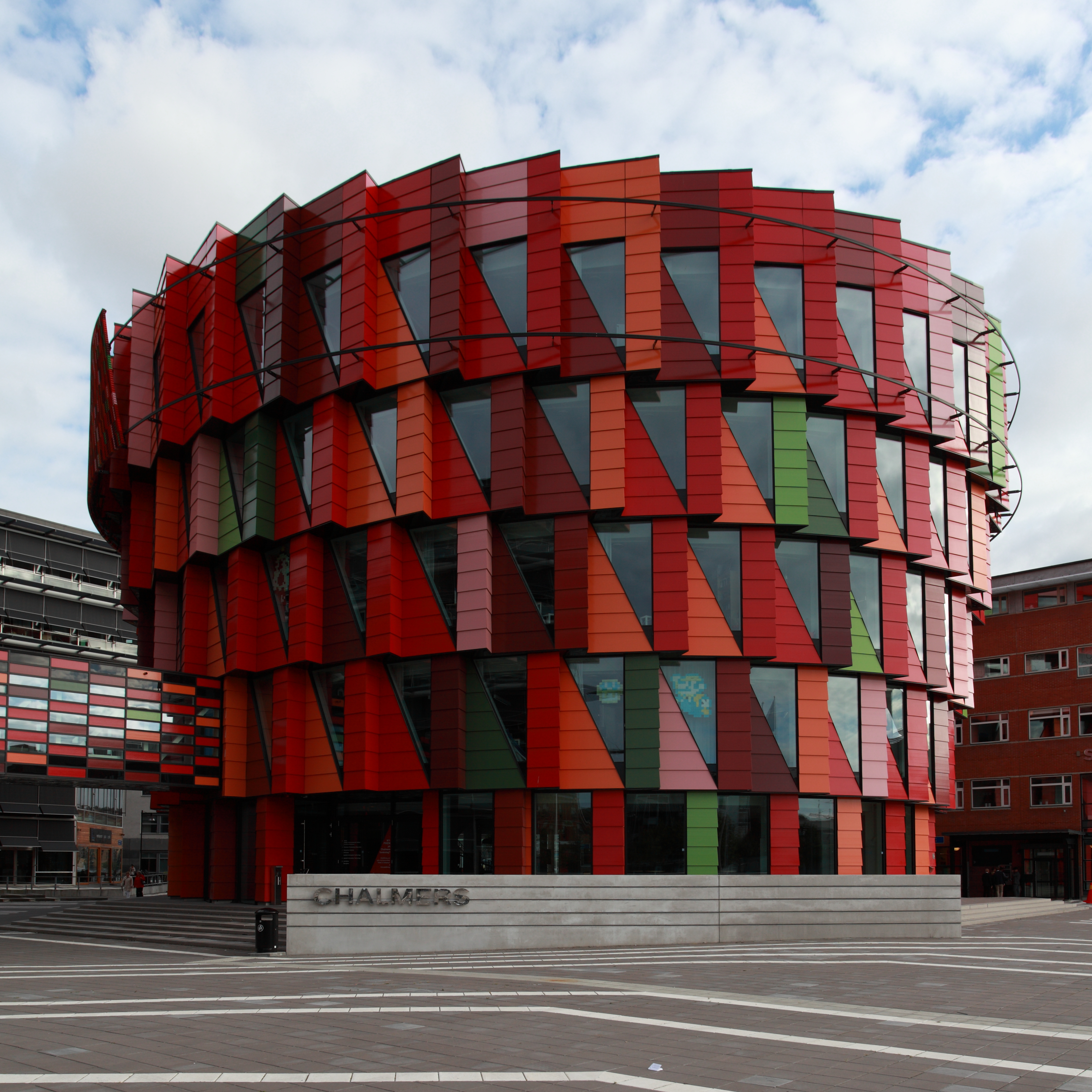
Kuggen's movable sunscreen that tracks the sun to shade the top two floors of the building.

They are based on managing solar energy in different formats. Usually, they use one of the following five types of solar control devices: external, integrated, internal, double skin, and ventilated cavity. The first type of solar energy is solar heat. CABS related to this type of energy are intended to maximize solar heat gain in winter and minimize them in summer. Some examples of this technology are the solar barrel wall (water-filled oil barrels), water bags on the roof, dynamic insulation, and thermochromic (change color due to temperature) materials on walls to get appropriate color and reflectance responding to the outside temperature.

Another type of solar energy is solar light. CABS linked with this energy source are based on the control of indoor illuminance levels, distributions, windows views, and glare. To accomplish these tasks, there are three main ways: with traditional mechanical systems (wide range of options from venetian blinds up to a complex motorized system) innovative mechanical systems (rotational, retractable, sliding, active daylighting and self-adjusting fenestration schemes), and smart glass or translucent materials (thermochromic, photochromic, electrochromic materials). This last one is used in windows and can achieve its goal in four ways: change in optical properties, lighting direction, visual appearance, and thermophysical properties. Between these smart materials, electrically activated glazing for building façades has gained commercial viability and remains as the most visible indicator for smart materials in a building. The third kind of solar energy is solar electricity which mostly relays on installing integrated photovoltaics systems. To be considered CABS they must have the ability to be kinetic, rather than individually movable panels. Normally this is achieved through the use of heliotropic sun-tracking systems to maximize the solar energy capture.

==== Air-flow responsive systems ====
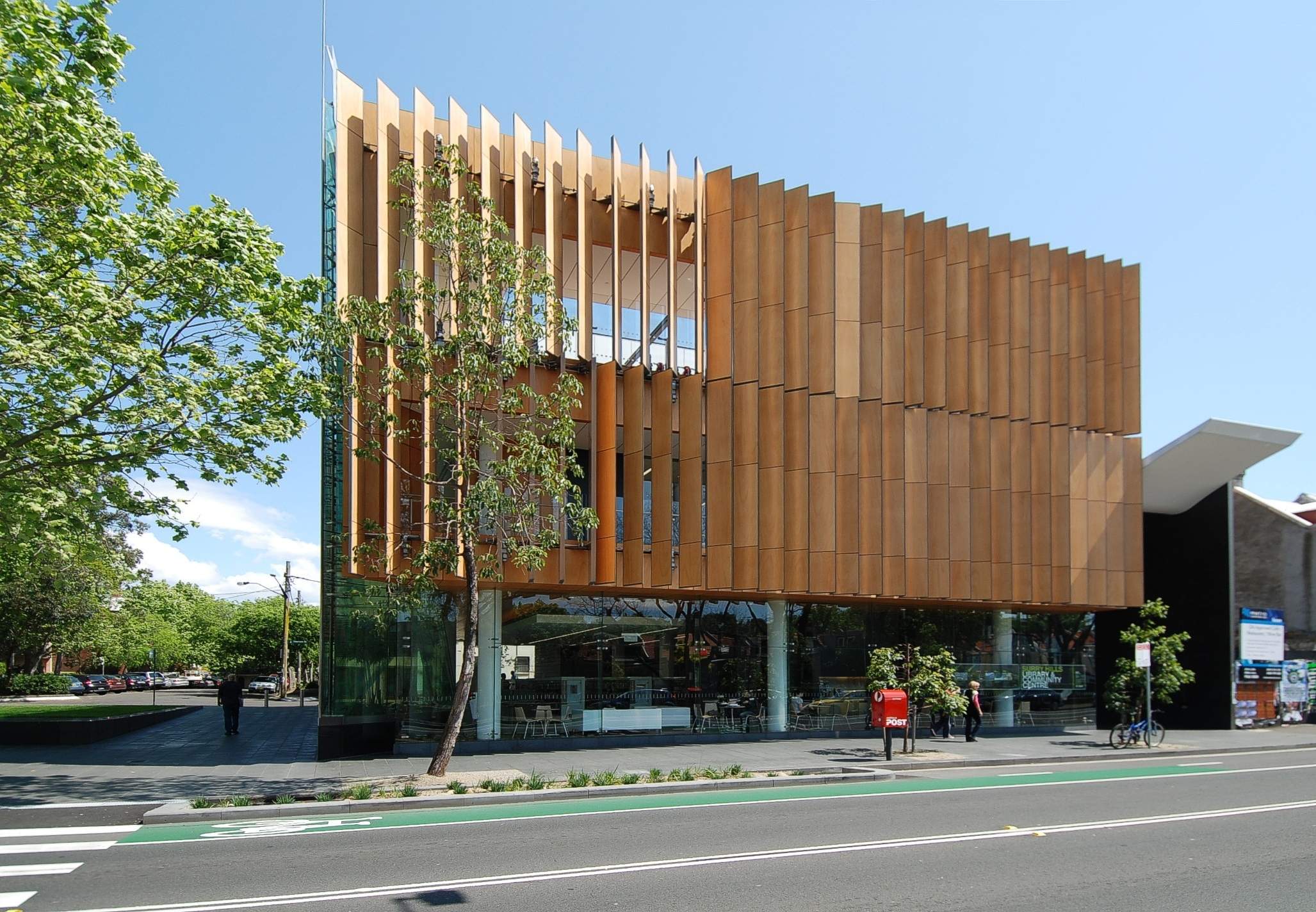
Computerized sun-travel system regulates the ventilation and sunshade louvers adjusting, air movement, light, shade and heat of the Surry Hills Library and Community Centre in Sydney, Australia

They are those related to natural ventilation and wind electricity. The first ones have the goal of exhausting the excess of carbon dioxide, water vapor, odors and pollutants that tend to accumulate in an indoor space. At the same time, they must replace it with new and fresh air, usually coming from the outside. Some examples of this type of technology are kinetic roof structure and double skin facades. Other less common types of CABS are the ones generating wind electricity. Thus, they convert wind energy into electrical energy via small scale wind turbines integrated into buildings. This can be for example as wind turbines fitted horizontally between each floor. Other examples may be found in buildings such as the Dynamic Tower, the COR Building in Miami and the Greenway Self-park Garage in Chicago.

==== Other natural sources systems ====
They may account for the use of rain, snow and additional natural supplies. Unfortunately, no extra information related to this issue was found.

=== Based on the time frame scale ===
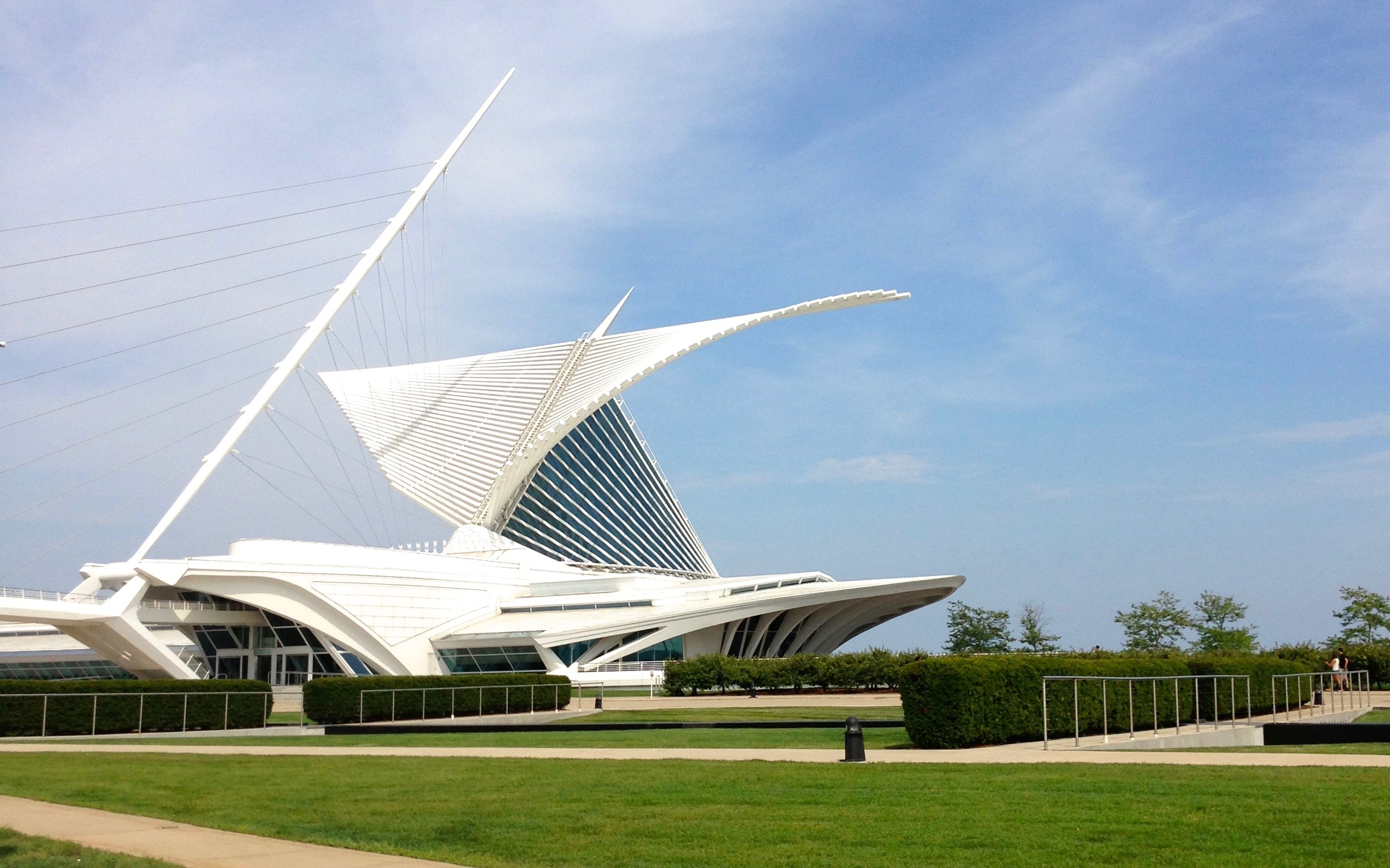
Calatrava's Burke Brise Soleil in the Milwaukee Art Museum opens every day providing shade to the building and closes every evening or when the weather conditions require

As dynamic technologies, CABS can show different configurations over time, extending from seconds up to changes appreciable during the lifetime of the building. Thus, the four types of adaptations based on the time frame scales are seconds, minutes, hours, and seasons

The variation that takes place just in seconds are found randomly in nature. Some examples may be short-term variations in wind speed and direction that may cause shifts in wind-based skins. An example of a shift that occurs within minutes is the cloud cover which has an impact on the daylight availability. Therefore, CABS that use this kind of energy may also fall into this category. Some changes that adjust in the order of hours are fluctuations in air temperature, and the track of sun through the sky (although sun movement around the sky is a continuous process, its track is done in this time scale). Finally, some CABS can adapt across seasons, and therefore are expected to offer extensive performance benefits.

=== Based on the scale of change ===
The adaptive behavior of CABS is related to how its mechanisms work. Therefore, they are either based on a change in behavior (macro-scale) or properties (micro-scale).

==== Macro-scale changes ====
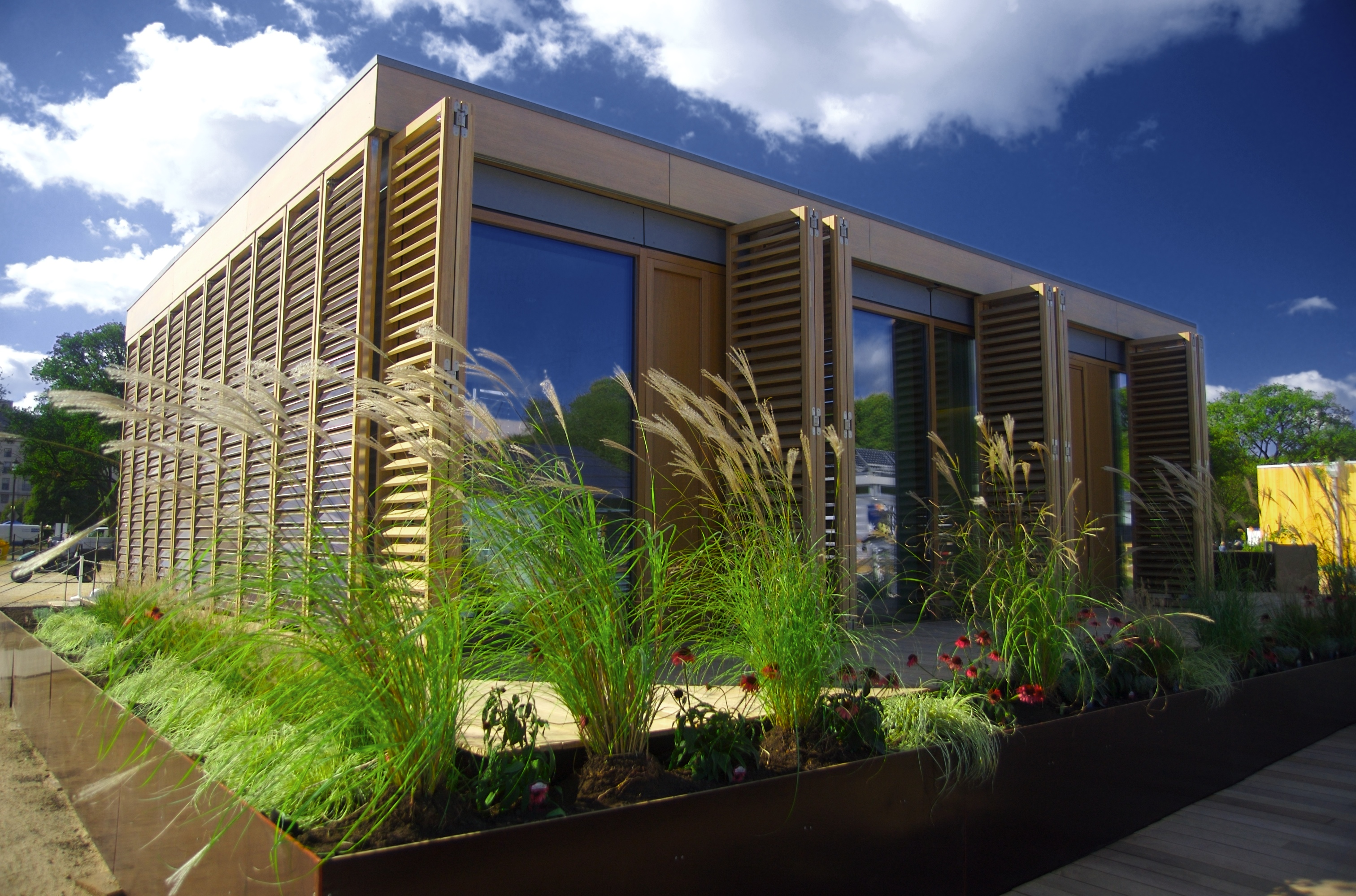
Intelligent facade with building-integrated photovoltaics on automated wood louvers for the TU Darmstadt's 2007 Solar Decathlon

It is often also referred to as "kinetic envelopes", which implies that a certain kind of observable motion is present, usually resulting in energy changes in the building shell's configuration. This is commonly achieved via moving parts that can perform at least one of the following actions: folding, sliding, expanding, creasing, hinging, rolling, inflating, fanning, rotating, curling, etc.

Based on their adaptive level, the macro scale mechanisms can be divided into two types of systems: intelligent building skins and responsive façade systems. The first ones use a centralization building system and sensing equipment to adjust to weather conditions. They should be capable of learning from the occupants' reactions and considering future weather fluctuation to respond accordingly. Some examples of this kind of feature are building automation and physically adaptive components such as louvers, sunshades, operable windows or smart material assemblies.

A responsive façade system has the same functions and performance characteristics of an intelligent building skin but goes even further by having an interactive aspect. This means it incorporates components such as computational algorithms which enable the building system to regulate itself and learn in time. Therefore, a responsive building skin, not only includes mechanisms for satisfying occupants desires and learn from their feedback, but it also encourages a dual educating path where both the building and its residents take place in a constant and growing conversation.

==== Micro-scale changes ====
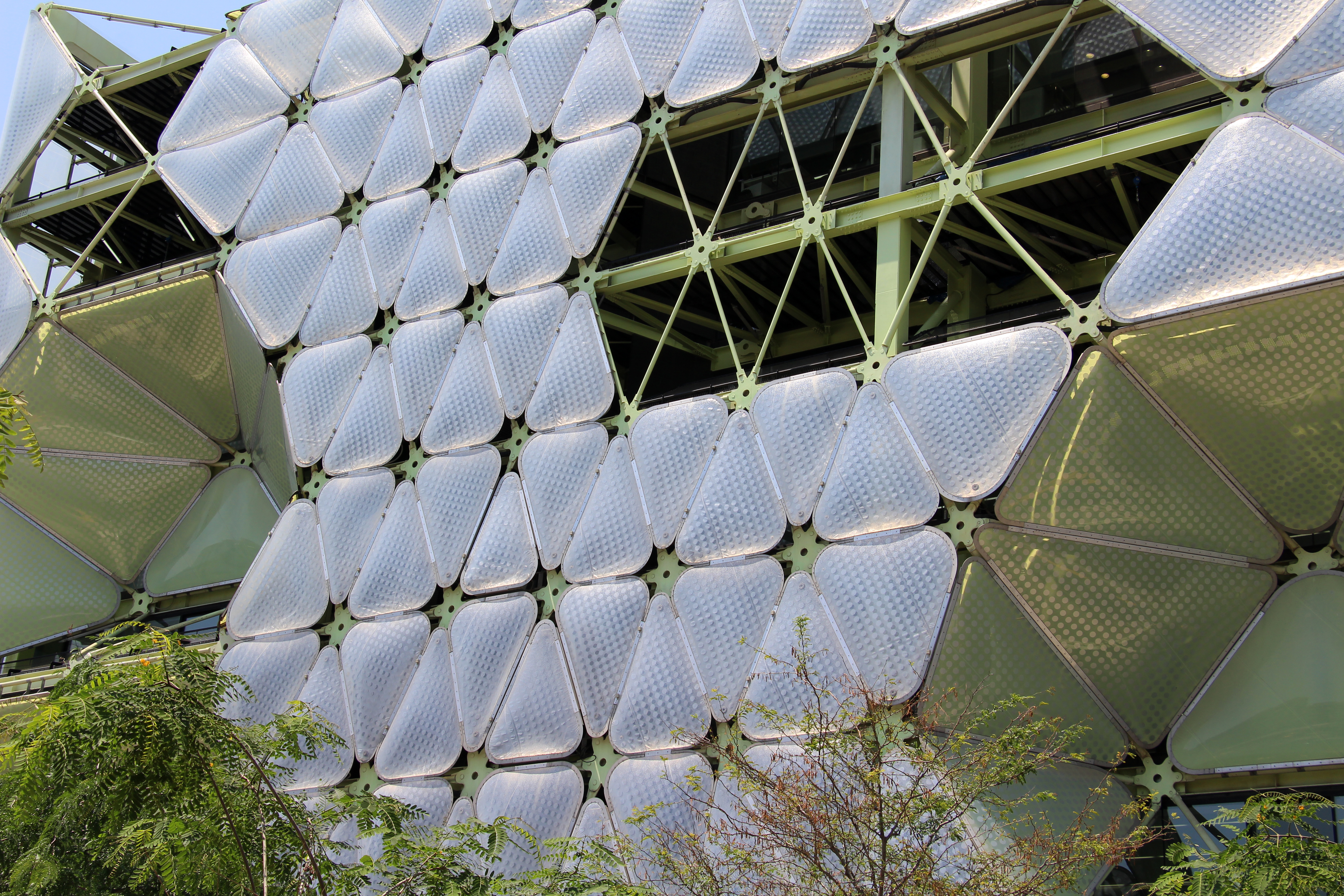
Three layers ETFE Diaphragms in the Media ICT Building (Barcelona, Spain) with the second and third layers able to change the façade's transparency based on the amount of air inside them.

These kinds of changes directly affect the internal structure of a material either via thermophysical or opaque optical properties, or through the exchange of energy from one form to another. When considering the adaptative level, they usually fall into the smart material category. They are characterized by being altered by outside stimuli such as temperature, heat, moisture, light, electric or magnetic fields. An important consideration in the use of this type of materials is whether their changes are reversible or irreversible.

The most attractive property that catches the designers' attention is its immediacy or real-time response, which in turn improves its functionality and performance, and at the same time decreases its energy use. Some examples are: aerogel, phase-change material (like micro-encapsulated wax), salt hydrates, thermochromic polymer films, shape-memory alloys, temperature-responsive polymers, structure integrated photovoltaics, and smart thermobimetal self-ventilating skins.

=== Based on the control type ===
There are two different control types: intrinsic and extrinsic regulators.

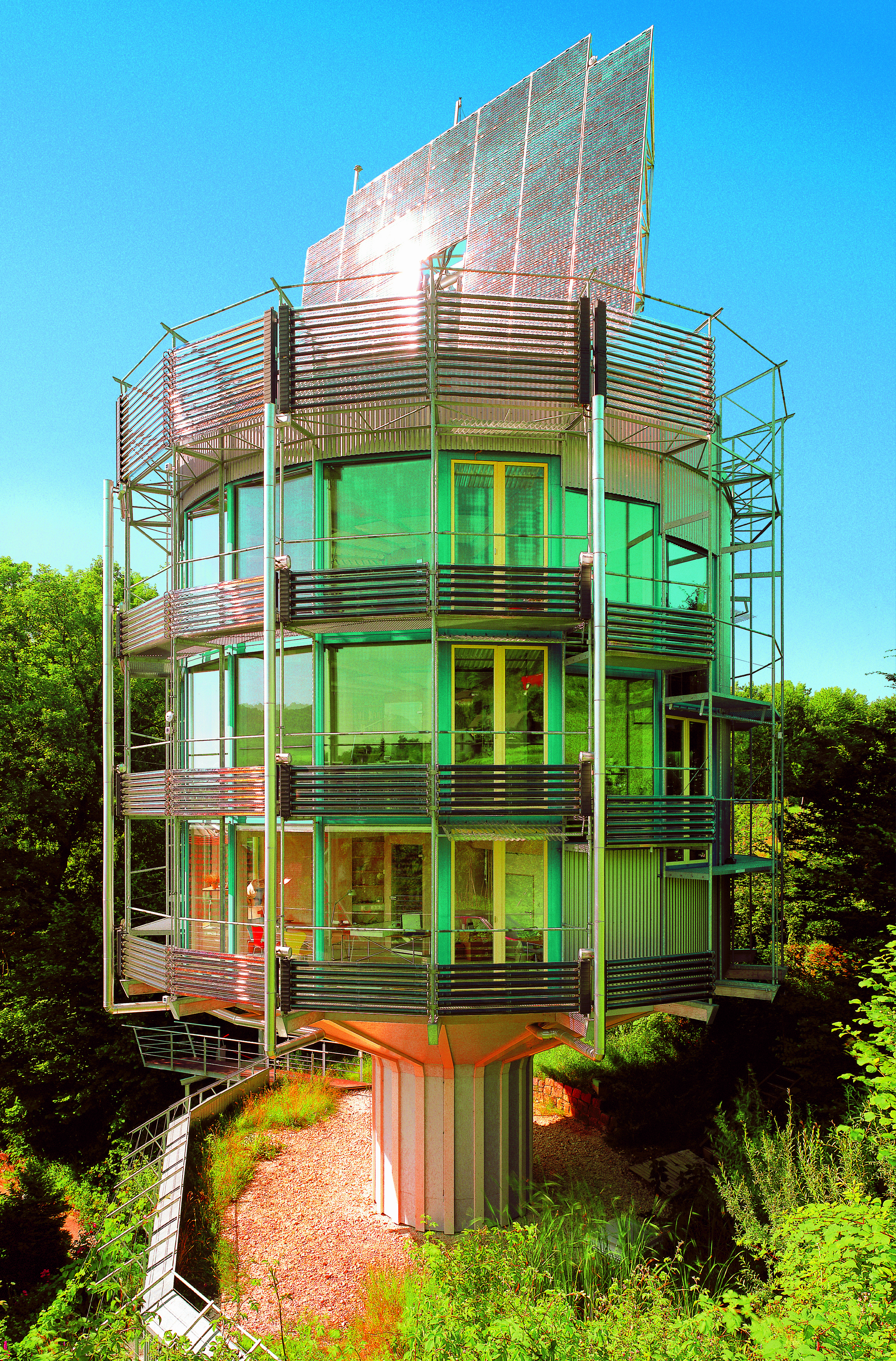
The Heliotrope (building) in Freiburg, Germany is a structure that rotates to face its windows towards the sun in winter and a blank white wall in the summer. Separately photovoltaic panels also rotate to maximize the collections of solar radiation.

==== Intrinsic controls ====
They are characterized by being self-adjusting systems, which means that their adaptive capacity is an integral feature. They are stimulated by environmental conditions such as: temperature, relative humidity, precipitation, wind speed and direction, etc. This self-sufficient control is sometimes referred to as "direct control" since the main drivers are the environmental impacts, without the need for external decision-making devices. Therefore, the need for fewer components may be seen as an advantage, as well as the fact that it can have an immediate change without the need for fuel or electricity. However, a downside is that is can only perform on the environmental conditions and variations it was designed for.

==== Extrinsic controls ====
This kind of controls can take advantage of feedback by changing their behavior based on comparisons of the current state with the desired one. Their structure has three main components: sensors, processors and actuators. Wrapping them up with a logic controller gives them the ability to make changes in two levels: distributed (regulated by local processors) or centralized (via a superior control unit). As an advantage, they have high levels of control allowing for manually intervention for satisfaction and well-being. A disadvantage is the need for various components.

=== Based on the spatial scale ===
The spatial scale of CABS refers to the physical size of a system. Therefore, the adaptation can take place as an envelope, façade, façade component and façade subcomponent.

=== Based on the inspirational scale ===
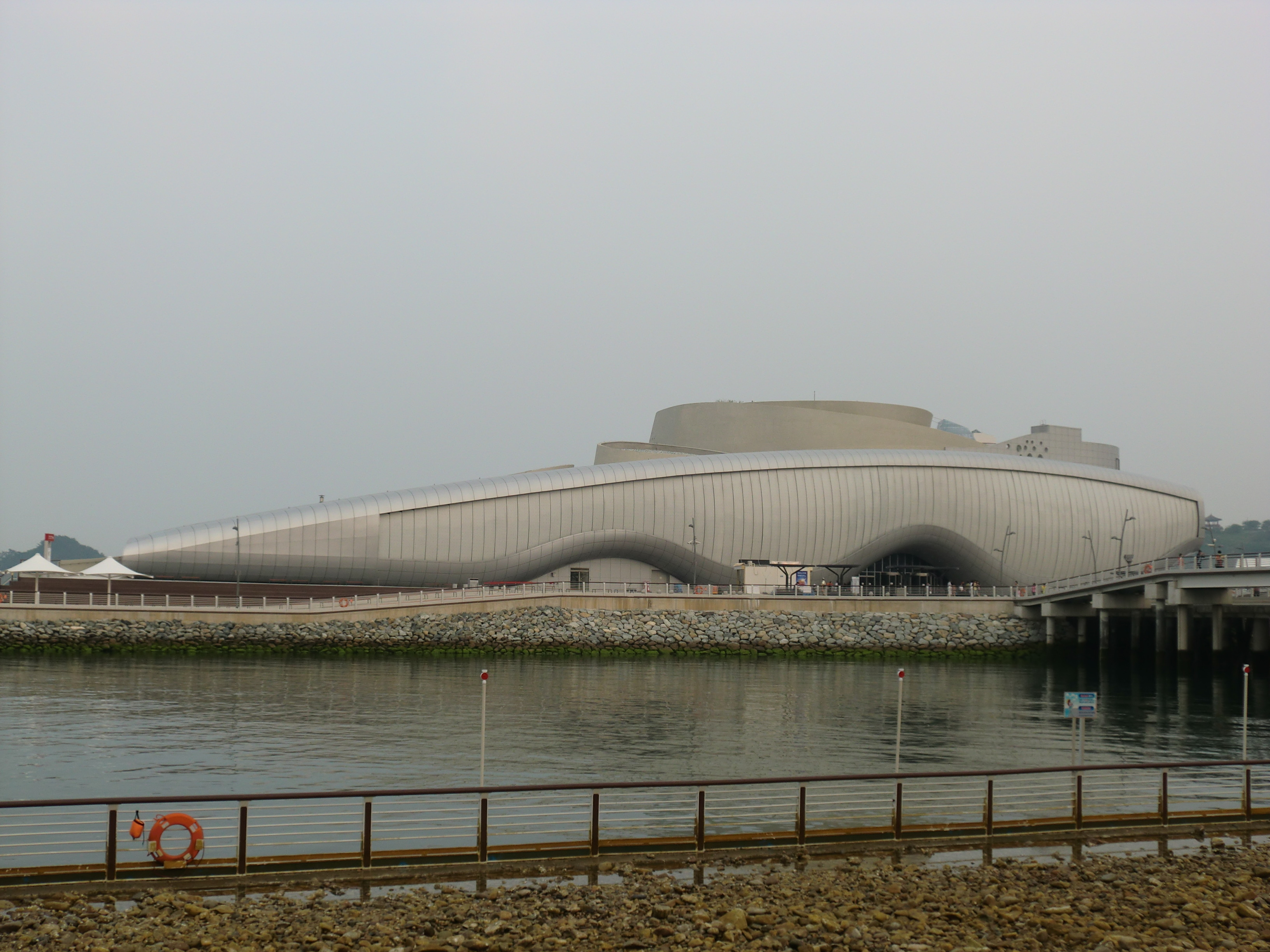
The kinetic façade of the Theme Pavilion at the Expo 2012 (Yeosu, South Korea) has hinged louvers that mimic the wave's movement

One of the fundamental characteristics of human beings is the ability to create new things. As a starting point inspiration is needed, which can come from nature or other sources such as own ideas. Therefore, the use of organisms' morphological or physiological properties or natural behaviors in no-biological sciences is known as biomimetics and is commonly used in building sciences. The CABS who get this source of inspiration are known as biomimetic adaptive building skins (Bio-ABS). Thus, the variation in properties and behaviors are transferred from biological representations that provide environmentally, mechanically, structurally or material-wise efficient strategies to buildings.

Within the biomimetic adaptive building skins, there are two ways of categorization. The first one is based on the biomimetic approach. It discriminates according to the order in which the problem is solved. There are two possibilities: initiated through the identification of a technical problem to be solved by a biological solution (top-down) or with the examination of a biological solution to solve a technical problem (bottom-up). The second category of Bio-ABS is based on the adaptation level, which offers three types: morphological ( based on form, structure and texture), physiological, or behavioral.

=== Based on the development stage ===
This categorization embraces any analysis that measures the performance of a given CABS project. The developmental stages can be labeled as a preliminary model (PM), simulated model (SM), pilot-scale prototype (PSP) and full-scale application (FSA).

=== Based on the number of functions ===
This classification relays to the number of environmental factors that a given CABS adjust to when activated by stimuli independently. Some of them are: ventilating, heating/cooling, improving air quality, regulating humidity levels, changing color, and regulating energy demand. In this way, they can be monofunctional or multifunctional.

=== Based on the performance task ===
This last differentiation accounts for the purpose and the evaluation of how effectively the adaptation is being achieved, therefore, divided into two subcategories. The first one is the performance target, which relates to the building aspect that is being assessed. Some examples are: indoor air quality, thermal comfort, visual comfort and energy demand. The second category is the measure and metric improvements. Some usual parameters measured are: displacement, daylight intake, humidification/dehumidification, heat dissipation, airflow, permeability and cooling.

== Motivations for the implementation of CABS ==
Buildings are exposed to a wide variety of changing conditions during their life cycle. Weather conditions vary not only throughout the year but also throughout the day. Also, the occupants' load, activities, and preferences vary constantly. Responding to this dynamism from and energy and comfort point of view, CABS offers the ability to actively moderate the exchange of energy across a building's skin over time. By doing this, in response to predominant meteorological conditions and comfort needs, it introduces good energy-saving opportunities.

While just for being constructed any building generates changes in its environment (such as solar patterns and wind variations), by having the ability to maximize the use of exterior resources it mitigates its environmental consequences. Thus, CABS use the "existing natural energies to light, heat and ventilate the spaces", obtaining maximum thermal comfort conditions. As an example, by incorporating the photovoltaic principles into the glass intended to be used in facades, the new skins will generate local and non-polluting electricity to supply the buildings' energy needs. Also, it promotes the use of daylight, that when it comes from a window with an exterior view it "results in increased productivity, mental function, and memory recall".

The building envelope is one of the most important design parameters determining indoor physical environment related to thermal comfort, visual comfort, and even occupancy working efficiency. To promote the creation of healthier and more productive spaces, not only daylight but natural ventilation, and other external resources must be considered. These are current tasks performed by CABS as environmental-based technologies. Thus, CABS not only have better performance than static envelopes, but also "provide an exciting aesthetic, the aesthetic of change".

The fact that CABS respond to changing conditions in a flexible way provides them the opportunity to maintain a high level of performance during real-time changes. This is achieved through anticipation and reaction. Therefore, the systems can handle environmental uncertainty, which is very appreciated. This flexibility is performed in CABS in three ways: adaptability (climate mediators between indoor and outdoor), multi-ability (multiple and new roles over time), and evolvability (ability to handle changes over a longer time horizon).

The use of dynamic and sustainable technologies offer the possibility to have better environmental and economic performances of building envelopes. For example, by having heat avoidance and passive cooling features, buildings can be less expensive because of less cooling energy needs and therefore reduced mechanical equipment required. Even though the demand for satisfying working environment and economic performance has increased, CABS have the potential to undertake this goal.

== Drawbacks for the implementation of CABS ==
As Mols et al. claim, CABS is an immature concept, needing more research due to the lack of successful applications in practice. Likewise, as a consequence of being an unexplored concept, "the true value of making building shells adaptive is yet an unknown, and we can only guess how much of this potential is accessible with existing concepts and technologies". At its current stage, the concept is yet more theoretical than practical, being backed up by simulation technologies instead of constructed projects. Kuru et al. add to this point by saying that, from their research, academia projects are more frequent than real-world industrial ones.

Since the concept of CABS relays on changes, it is sometimes related to devices and technologies that require higher operational and maintenance activity than static envelopes. This has several implications, such as greater attention to possible failures, the need of repairs, and on some occasions higher operational and maintenance costs. Also, sometimes the need for a centralized control center may affect this issue. Therefore, the election of the kind of technology is an issue that must be taken with care.

However, Lechner states that the current reliability of cars demonstrates that movable systems can be made that require few if any repairs over long periods. He finishes this idea by saying that "with good design and materials, exposed building systems have become extremely reliable even with exposure to saltwater and ice in the winter". Therefore, although there is a concern on the operation and maintenance of these types of technologies, there seems to be a solution in the decision making of the type, the materials and the design of such devices.

As dynamic mechanisms, CABS may depend on energy availability. Contrastingly, passive technologies do not present this problem because they do not actively act, presenting a higher robustness of the system towards change. Its independence of any external input (electricity, thermal energy or data) enables its continuing functionality, even in case of power failure. Therefore, to permit continuous operation, the use of backup alternatives such as a secondary energy source is likely to be suggested to some CABS.

Finally, the lack of control of several CABS may be seen as a flaw. There are some CABS, like the ones relying on smart materials, that cannot be controlled by the occupant. In these cases, if they do not satisfy the occupants' desire, they generate an unfortunate outcome. Thus, the possibility to control a given technology may be seen as a strength or a weakness depending on the device, the intention and the task that needs to be achieved.

== Current status and use of these technologies ==
Historically, the façade has been the main load-bearing structural element of buildings, restricting its functionality and materiality. In the contemporary period, the façade is often liberated from its structural task letting for more flexibility to fit in diverse contexts such as saving/generating energy, providing thermal properties for comfort, and adaptability to changing conditions. Modern construction methods, developments in material sciences, dropping prices of electronic devices, and availability of controllable kinetic façade components now offer rich possibilities for innovative building envelope solutions that respond better to the environmental context, thereby allowing the façade to behave as a living organism.

However, most of the current status of CABS is focused on trying to better understand the concepts behind these technologies to be transferred and implemented in practical ways on buildings. Kuru et al., identify three major limitations in biomimetic adaptive building skins (Bio-ABS). The limitations suggested are: level of development, regulating diverse environmental factors, and performance evaluation.

They suggest that as normal to any immature concept, the majority of the intended projects are conceptual. One of the main reasons is the challenges of combining multiple disciplines like architecture, biomimetics and engineering to finally develop, analyze and measure performance. Moreover, procedures to identify and transfer biological solutions into architectural systems are limited. Current software has limitations in terms of having specific tools and methods that can mimic the performance of Bio-ABS. Adding to this issue, the transition from digital models to the physical application requires the teamwork of experts from different fields, which sometimes can be hard to achieve.

Another current deficiency is the focus on monofunctional CABS, which turns to be a waste on the opportunity of improvement. The idea behind CABS is to have envelopes that could respond to various internal and external factors, not just one per building skin. Moreover, the support and development rate of CABS tasks is being uneven. For example, from the research of Kuru et al. the results show that the light management CABS are most comprehensively developed while the energy regulations are the least studied. Thus, while it is likely to see a boost in the implementation of lighting management CABS, the ones related to energy regulation may seem lagging. Similarly, the research currently conducted is characterized by fragmented developments. Some of it going in the direction of material science (e.g. switchable glazing, adaptable thermal mass, and variable insulation), and others in creative processes.

As a consequence of the drawbacks presented above, currently, the most common way of using energy efficiency in buildings is having a whole building (not only envelope) approach. There are few examples of façades that incorporate passive or smart technologies to create a comfortable indoor space, except for shading technologies such as blinds or louvers and operable windows for ventilation. Therefore, future improvements in this field may be required to overcome these issues.

== Future improvements on CABS ==
Several challenges must be faced to improve the growth of CABS. The first one is the creation of custom made software that could analyze dynamic systems based on a climatic pattern. Moreover, if the software can anticipate and examine the future consequences of actions happening at the present, more accurate results can be obtained. This could be improved by introducing logic controls into CABS's software. Finally, making more user-friendly interfaces could ease the usage of these tools.

Following this idea, not only software but also the scope of topics that CABS currently gather could be extended as well. Therefore, the creation of new ways to manage and control energy, water and heat must be explored. One way to do so would be by engineering how to mimic the biological methods to translate them into a practical way for buildings. Nature could inspire large innovations for CABS to advance beyond current capabilities.

A common characteristic of developing ideas is that to grow and prosper, risks must be taken. Therefore, opening the possibility of failure. CABS are not the exception, and to be successful developers must take the risks, for example, the ones related to long periods of payback time and high operative costs. Mols et al. mention that "If the developer chooses to take the risks, the outcomes are claimed to be beneficiary". Some of these risks relay on the uncertainty behind CABS. A way to mitigate them is by monitoring operational performance and by conducting post-occupancy evaluations growing data on the actual performance of current CABS which right now is lacking in the literature. As a conclusion, the idea of CABS needs the support and commitment of all buildings stakeholders to be able to transcend.

== Notable examples ==
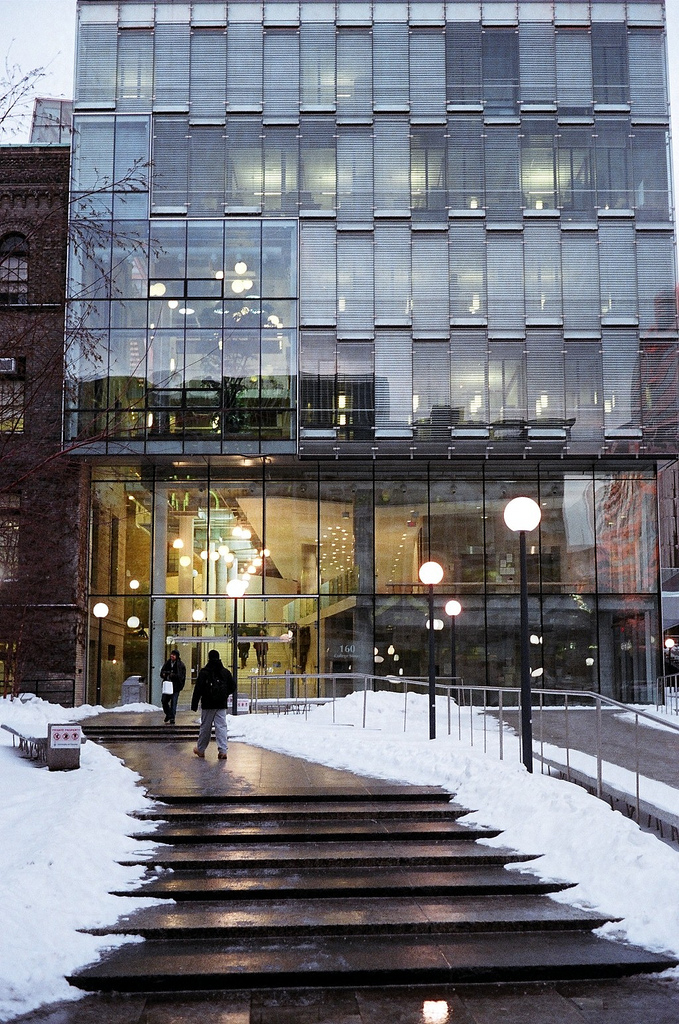
Terrence Donnelly Centre for Cellular and Biomolecular Research's double skin which mitigates the amount of heat entering the building as well as provide for natural ventilation

Although the concept of CABS is still relatively new, several hundreds of concepts can be found in buildings all over the world. The following list shows an overview of notable examples.

=== Built examples ===
- Al Bahar Towers, Aedas, Abu Dhabi
- Arab World Institute, Jean Nouvel, Paris, France
- Heliotrope, Rolf Disch, Freiburg, Germany
- Burke Brise Soleil – Quadracci Pavilion, Milwaukee Art Museum Milwaukee, Wisconsin, United States
- Surry Hills Library, Francis-Jones Morehen Thorp, Sydney, Australia
- Bengt Sjostrom Theatre, Studio Gang Architects, Rockford, Illinois, United States
- Kuggen movable sunscreen, Wingårdh arkitektkontor, Gothenburg, Sweden
- The Barcelona Media-ICT Building Barcelona, Spain
- Terrence Donnelly Centre for Cellular and Biomolecular Research Toronto, Canada
- Devonshire Building University of Newcastle
- New San Francisco Federal Building San Francisco, United States
