= Wingårdh arkitektkontor =

Swedish architectural company

Practice information
- Key architects: Gert Wingårdh, Chairman
- Founded: 1977
- Location: Gothenburg

Significant works and honors
- Buildings: Öijared Executive Country Club, Lerum, 1988, Astra Zeneca R&D Site, Mölndal, 1993-, Swedish Embassy, Berlin, 1999, Universeum Science Centre, Gothenburg, 2001, Auditorium and Student Union at Chalmers University of Technology, Gothenburg, 2001, Housing at Bo01, Malmö, 2001, Arlanda flight control tower Arlanda, Sigtuna, 2001, Aranäs Senior High School, Kungsbacka, 2006, House of Sweden, Washington, D.C., 2003-06, Vällingby shopping centre, 2008, Stockholm, Müritzeum visitors centre, Mecklenburg, 2008, Citadellbadet swimming baths, Landskrona, 2005-07, Malmö Arena, Malmö, 2008, Building 10, Kista, 2010, Emporia shopping mall, Malmö, 2007-11, Spira Concert hall and theatre, Jönköping, 2006-11, Naturum Tåkern, Mjölby, 2008-2011, Scandic Victoria Tower, Stockholm, 2008-12, Aula at Karolinska Institutet, Solna, 2006-13, Naturum Laponia, Gällivare, 2009-13, Kuggen, at Chalmers University of Technology, Gothenburg, 2011, Nationalmuseum, Stockholm, renovation, 2018, Liljevalchs+, addition to Liljevalchs konsthall in Stockholm, 2021, Filborna vattentorn, water tower outside Helsingborg, 2021, Pasteurs Tårn, Copenhangen, 2022.
- Awards: Won Kasper Salin Prize six times, 1988 for Öijareds Executive Country Club, 1993 for Astra Hässle, 2001 for Chalmers Students' Union, 2006 for Aranäsgymnasiet, 2007 for House of Sweden in Washington DC, 2021 for Filborna vattentorn.

Wingårdh arkitektkontor is an architectural firm based in the Sweden with offices in Gothenburg, Stockholm and Malmö. The practice is led by its founder, Gert Wingårdh. As of 2022, it has about 150 employees.
