= Gert Wingårdh =

Swedish architect

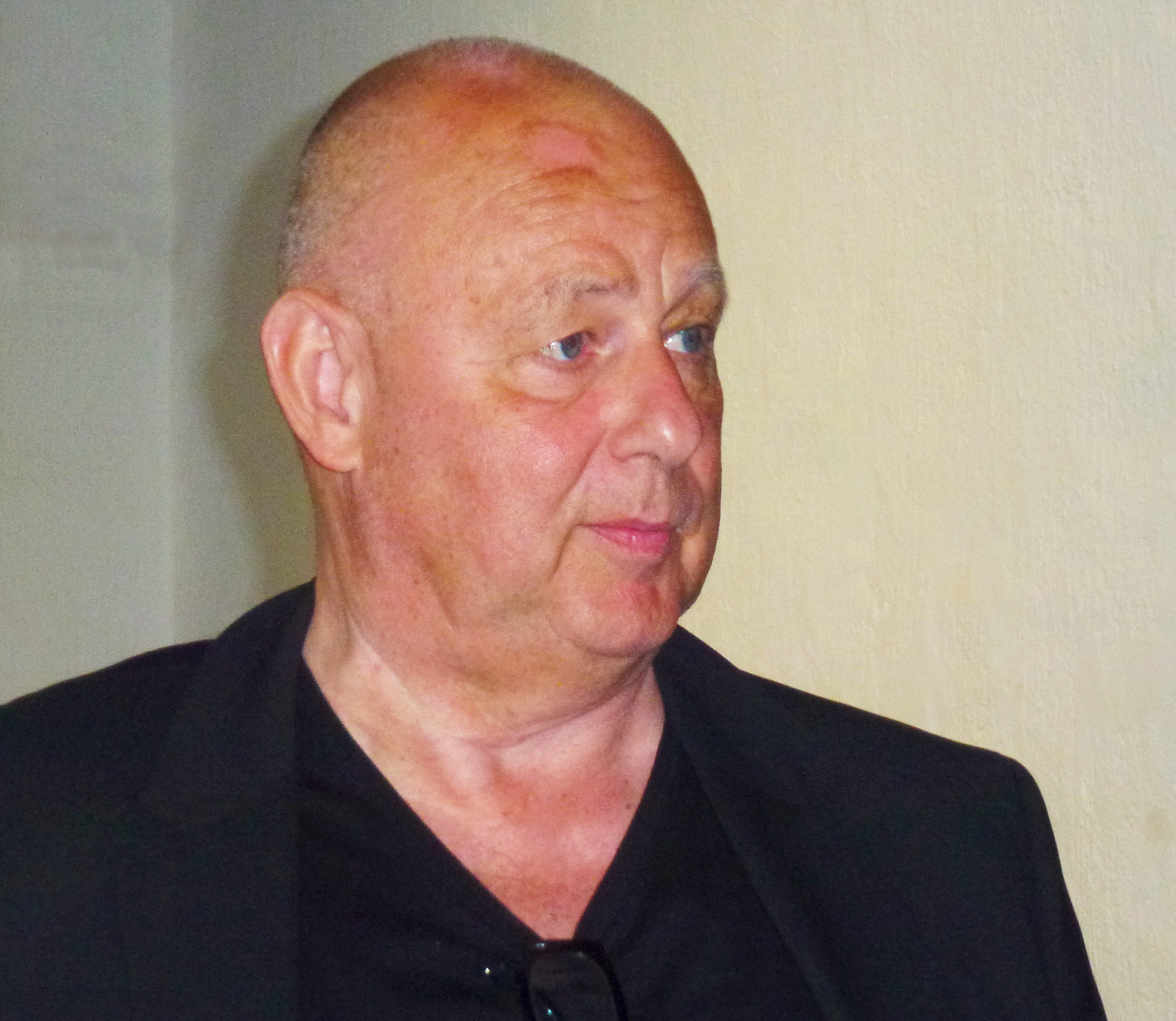
- Wingårdh in 2015
- Born: 26 April 1951 (age 75); Skövde, Sweden
- Education: Chalmers University of Technology
- Occupation: Architect
- Awards: Kasper Salin Prize 1988, 1993, 2001, 2006, 2007; ECSN European Award for Excellence in Concrete 2002; Prince Eugen Medal 2005; American Architecture Awards 2007
- Practice: Wingårdh arkitektkontor
- Buildings: Astra Zeneca R&D site Universeum; Chalmers University of Technology auditorium and student union building Housing at Bo01; Stockholm Arlanda Airport air traffic control tower House of Sweden; Müritzeum; Malmö Arena; Sven-Harry's Art Museum; Emporia; Spira Cultural Center; Scandic Victoria Tower; Karolinska Institutet aula Kuggen

Gert Wingårdh (born 1951) is a Swedish architect whose company, Wingårdh arkitektkontor, maintains an international practice.

== Early life ==
Gert Wingårdh was born 1951 into a wealthy family in Skövde, Skaraborg County, as the only child. His father owned the local cement factory and the family's house was built on a limestone mountain. Both cement and limestone are materials Wingårdh later has used in his work.

When Wingårdh was ten the family moved to Gothenburg. After moving to Gothenburg he was bullied by other children for a while. As a teenager he discovered an interest in art and cinema.

== Education ==
Wingårdh studied economics, art history and architecture in the 1970s at University of Gothenburg and Chalmers University of Technology, and has in interviews stated that it was a visit to the Pantheon, Rome, that made him decide to become an architect. Before deciding to become an architect he had plans to be an art-gallery owner.

He received his degree in architecture from Chalmers in 1975.

== Career ==
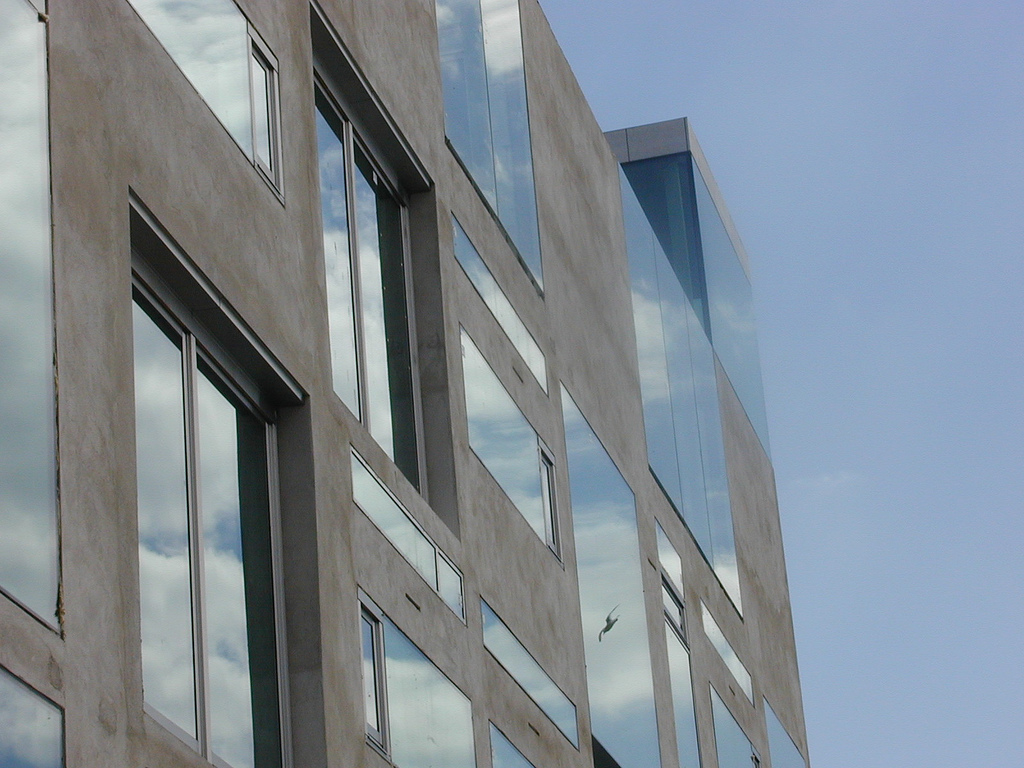
Facade of Bo01 Housing, Malmö

Gert Wingårdh started as an interior decorator in the 1970s. After graduating he joined an architectural firm for a short while before setting up his own office in 1977. He had his big breakthrough as a regular architect with the Öijared Executive Country Club outside Gothenburg in 1988. The building rendered him a Kasper Salin Prize.

He has had a number of assignments in the United States and Germany in recent years. Wingårdh is also the creator of the Swedish embassies in Washington and Berlin. Most of his realized buildings, however, can be found in Sweden and in particular in the area of metropolitan Gothenburg. In 2007 Wingårdh won a major international competition for a large new shopping centre in Malmö, and in the same year seven of the twelve hottest architecture projects in the capital Stockholm – listed by a Swedish national daily – were designed by Wingårdh.

Several spectacular projects have created considerable attention but remained unexecuted, such as a conference centre in Östersund, Jämtland, on the top of a mountain, called Breath of Life. Features developed in these experimental projects do occasionally return in built projects later, such as the curved glass facade that is realized in the shopping mall Emporia in Malmö 2011.

Because of his skills, his way of constantly attract the media attention and the many prizes he has received, he is generally considered the most renowned living Swedish architect. His role as a public figure is not without controversy, though. He has for example been known to be an advocate of skyscrapers which has made him a subject of critique from some (Swedish) colleagues.

He became PhD (HC) at Chalmers University of Technology in 1999 and received the Prince Eugene Medal in 2005. In 2007 Gert Wingårdh was appointed adjunct professor in building design at the architecture faculty at Chalmers.

The Wingårdh office has circa 170 employees (2022).

== Architectural style ==
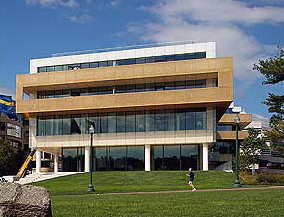
House of Sweden, Washington, D.C.

Gert Wingårdh started as a Postmodernist in the 1980s, as one of the architects who broke away from the strong Functionalist (International style) norm that held sway over Scandinavia longer than in other countries.

He is known to pick up new trends in architecture quickly and interpret them with a personal expressive language which integrates the surrounding landscapes into the projects: "His buildings do not stubbornly adhere to one style but are a response to the task in hand and the surrounding environmental conditions. Sweden's rich tradition of building with wood and a strong ecological awareness is combined with high tech expertise".

Wingårdh has himself described his architecture as "high organic", combining high tech with organic architecture. He also has been described as a "maximalist" rather than a "minimalist", his buildings being "a kind of modern baroque". He has shown influences from and kinship with such different architects as Frank Lloyd Wright, Hans Scharoun, Carlo Scarpa, Frank Gehry and Peter Zumthor. Another paradoxical description states that his buildings are both "playful" and "strict".

A feature of Wingårdh's is to surprise the visitors of the buildings, keeping the entrance of a building low and then "heighten the sense of space and drama when entering the main rooms". He also has a good knowledge of details as well as an understanding of intricate building structures, which requires good knowledge of sociological processes and human behaviour.

== Awards ==
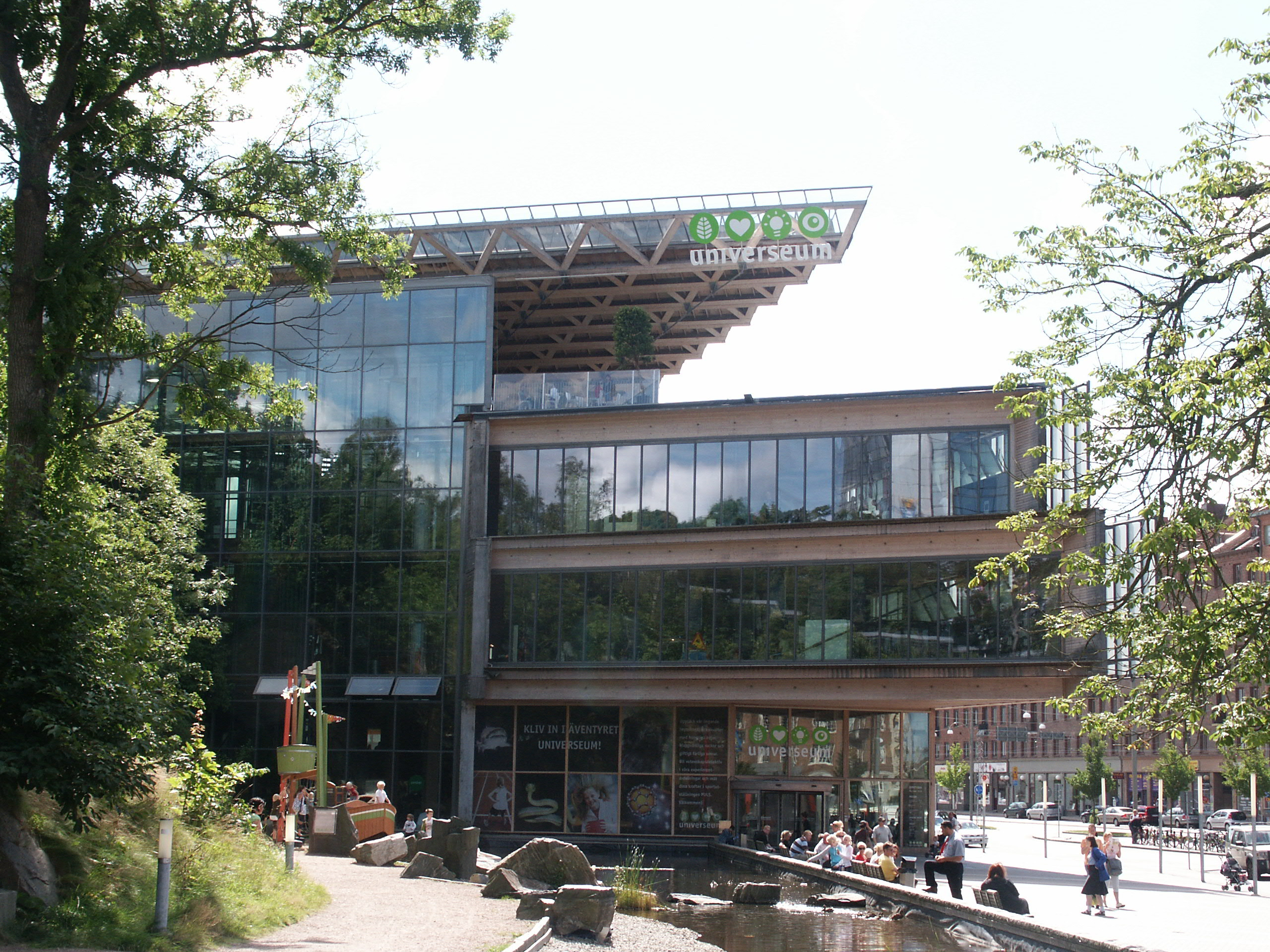
Universeum, Gothenburg

His building for the Öijared Executive Country Club, Lerum, was awarded the Kasper Salin Prize in 1988, and the Astra Zeneca R&D Site, Mölndal, was awarded the same prize in 1993. He received the ECSN European Award for Excellence in Concrete in 2002 for the Arlanda air traffic control tower. Other buildings include the Universeum Science Centre, Gothenburg (2001), and the auditorium and Student Union at Chalmers University of Technology, Gothenburg (2001), the latter also received the Kaspar Salin Prize. And in 2006 the Aranäs Senior High School in Kungsbacka was awarded the same prestigious prize. He was awarded the Prince Eugen Medal for architecture in 2005.

In 2006 Wingårdh also was nominated for the Mies van der Rohe Award for Mimer's house in Kungälv. House of Sweden was awarded the American Architecture Awards by the Chicago Athenaeum 2007.

The Washington embassy also received the Kasper Salin Prize 2007, making it Wingårdh's fifth Kasper Salin Prize—which places him in a league of his own among Swedish architects.

At the 2008 World Architecture Festival in Barcelona Wingårdh was declared the "clear winner" in the shopping category for the K:fem building in Vällingby, Stockholm. At the 2012 World Architecture Festival in Singapore, Victoria Tower in Stockholm was the winner in the hotel category. And at the 2013 World Architecture Festivale in Singapore the Emporia shopping center in Hyllie outside Malmö was declared the winner in the shopping category.

== Influences on architecture ==
Gert Wingårdh's awarded projects and his contributions to the public debate on architecture have contributed to a changed image of architecture and architects in Sweden. A will to create new solutions for every new task has enhanced the variation in the production but reduced his impact as a stylistic beacon. An ambition to "give the client what they did not know that they wanted" reveals a will to provoke as well as to adapt.

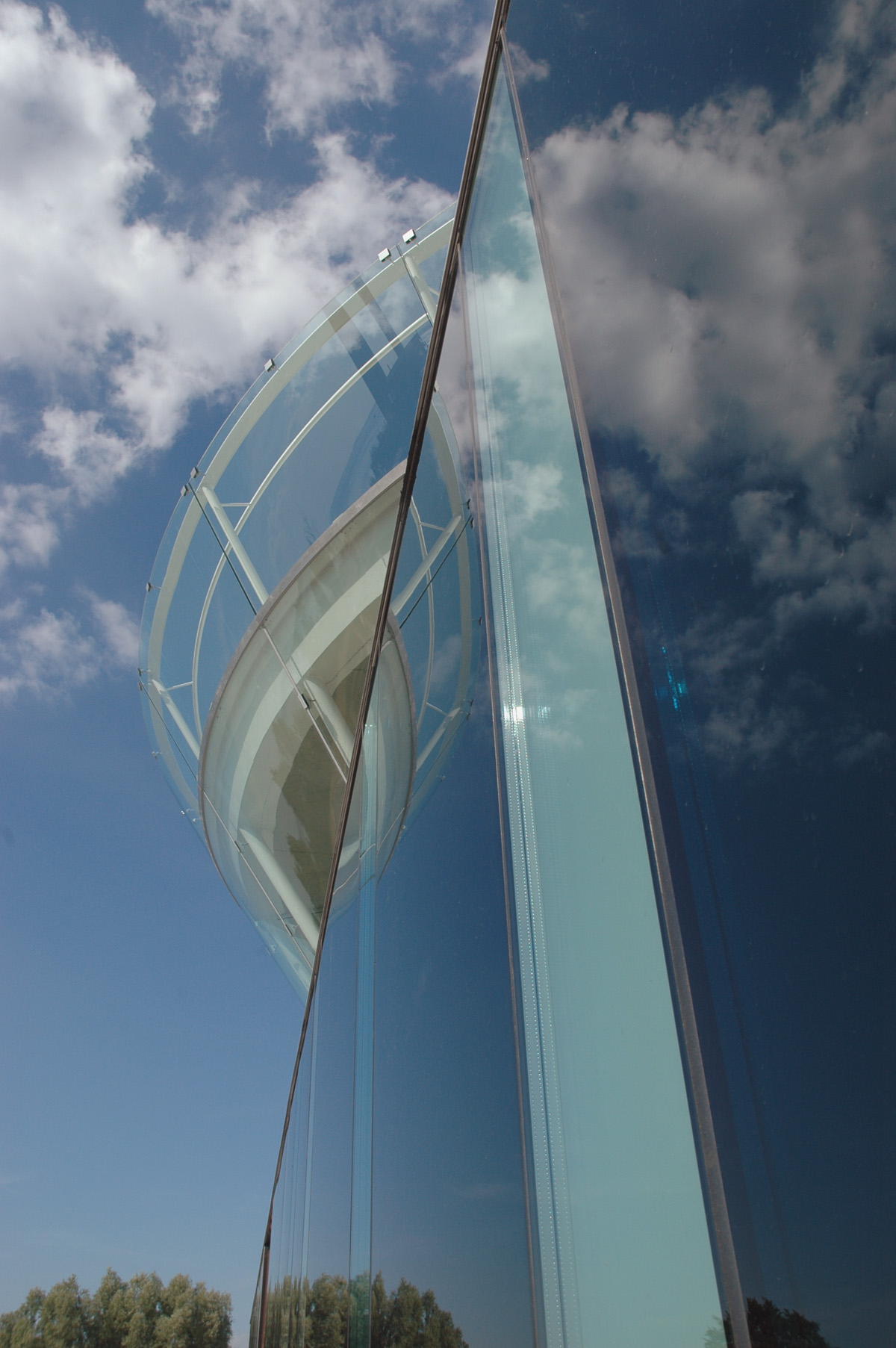
Citadellbadet in Landskrona, Sweden

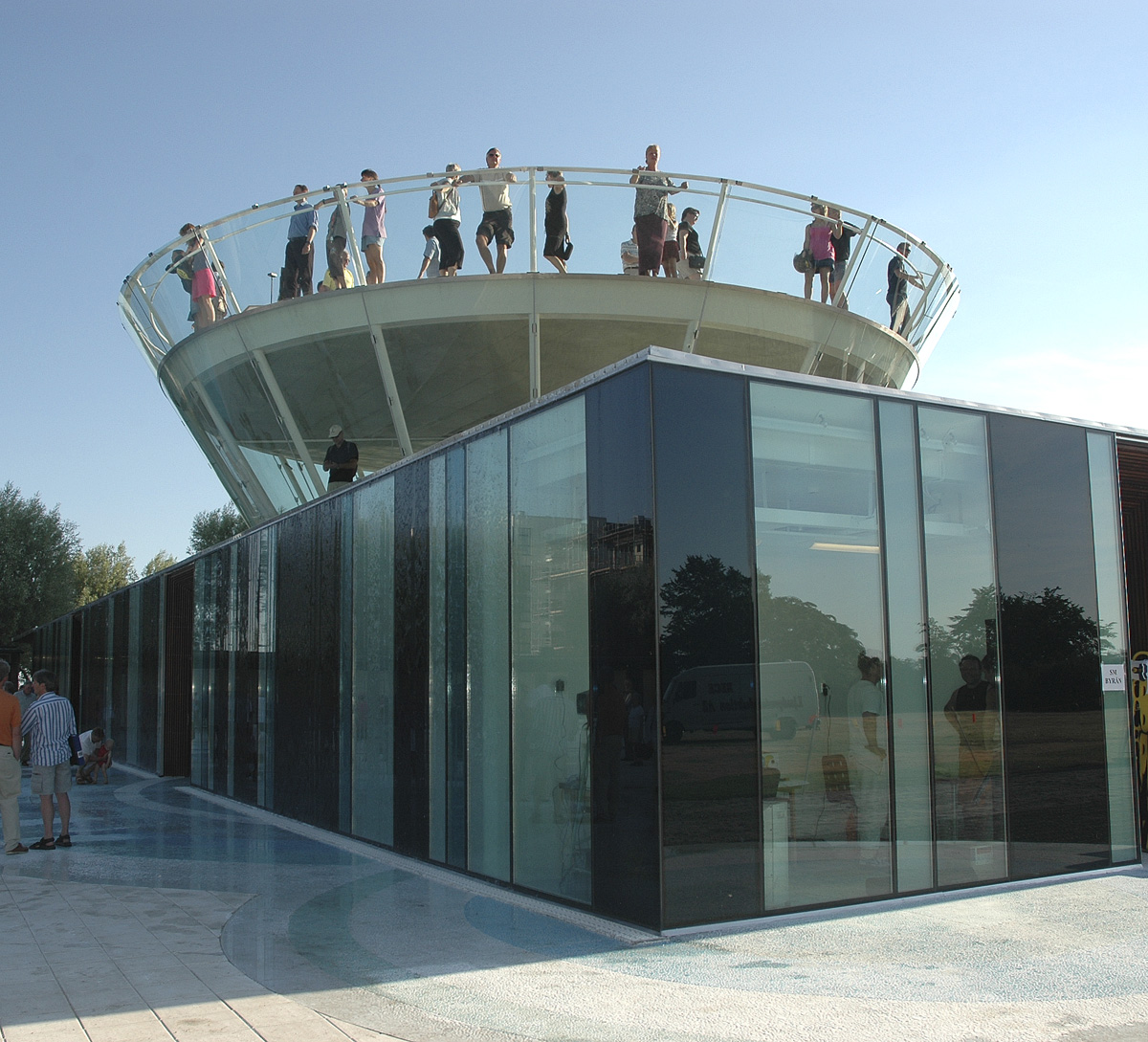
Citadellbadet in Landskrona, Sweden

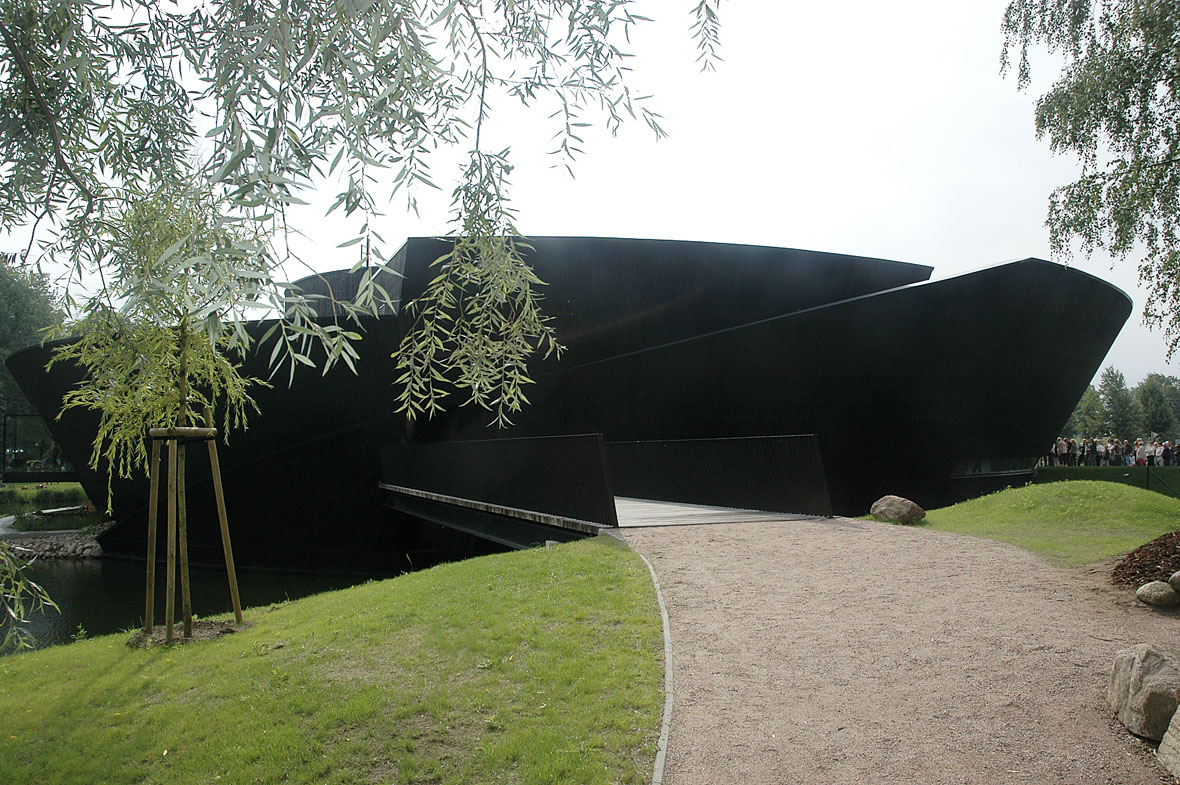
Müritzeum visitors centre in Germany

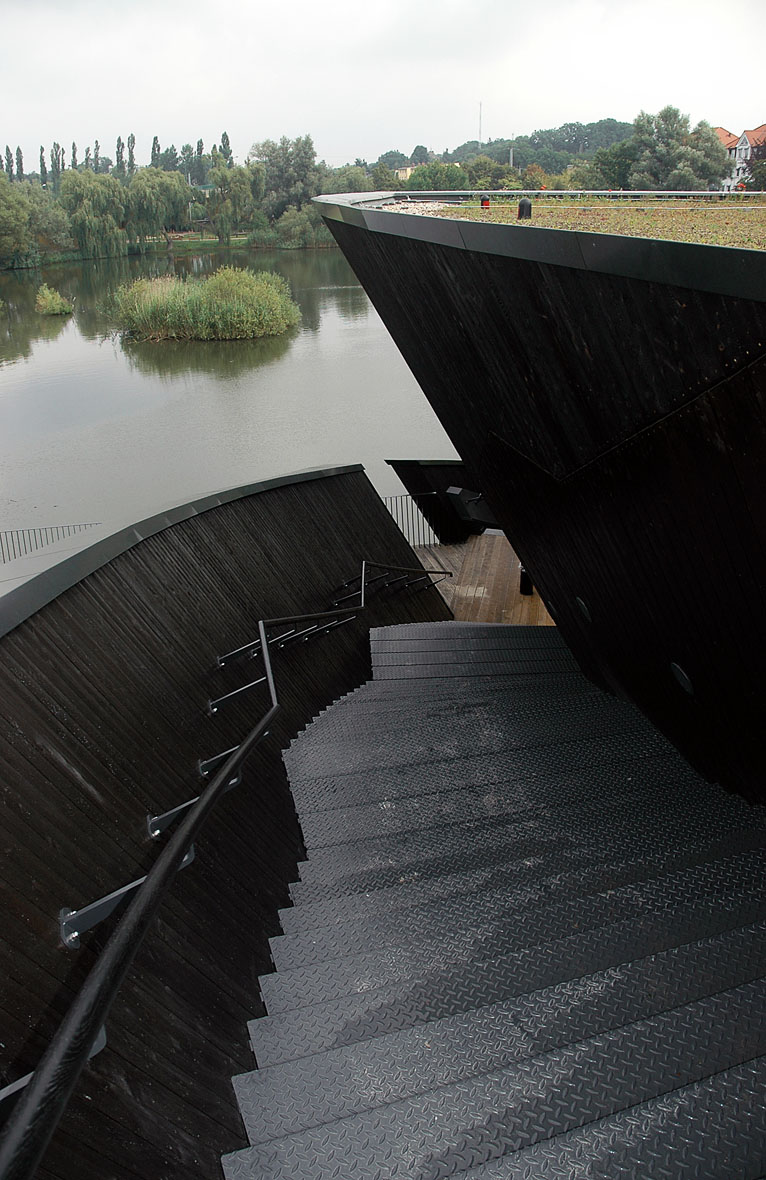
Müritzeum, facades of burnt wood

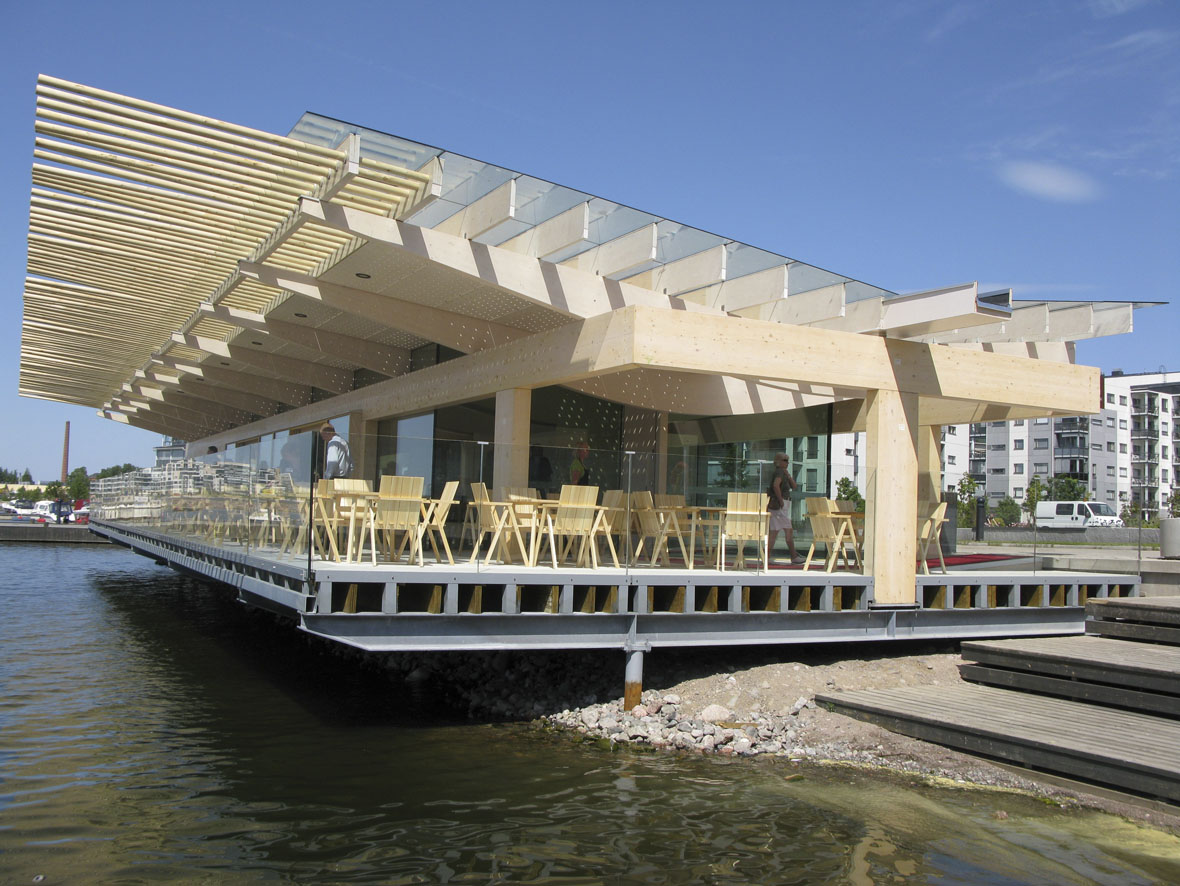
The Piano pavilion in Lahti, Finland

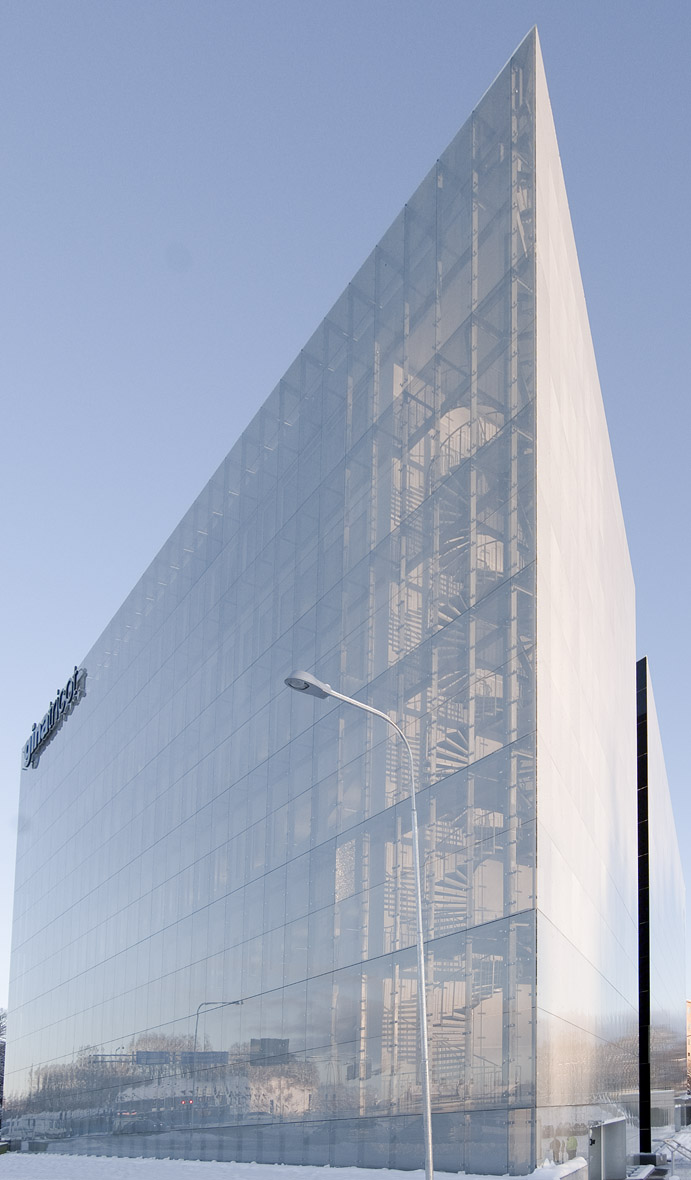
Headquarters for Gina Tricot in Borås, Sweden

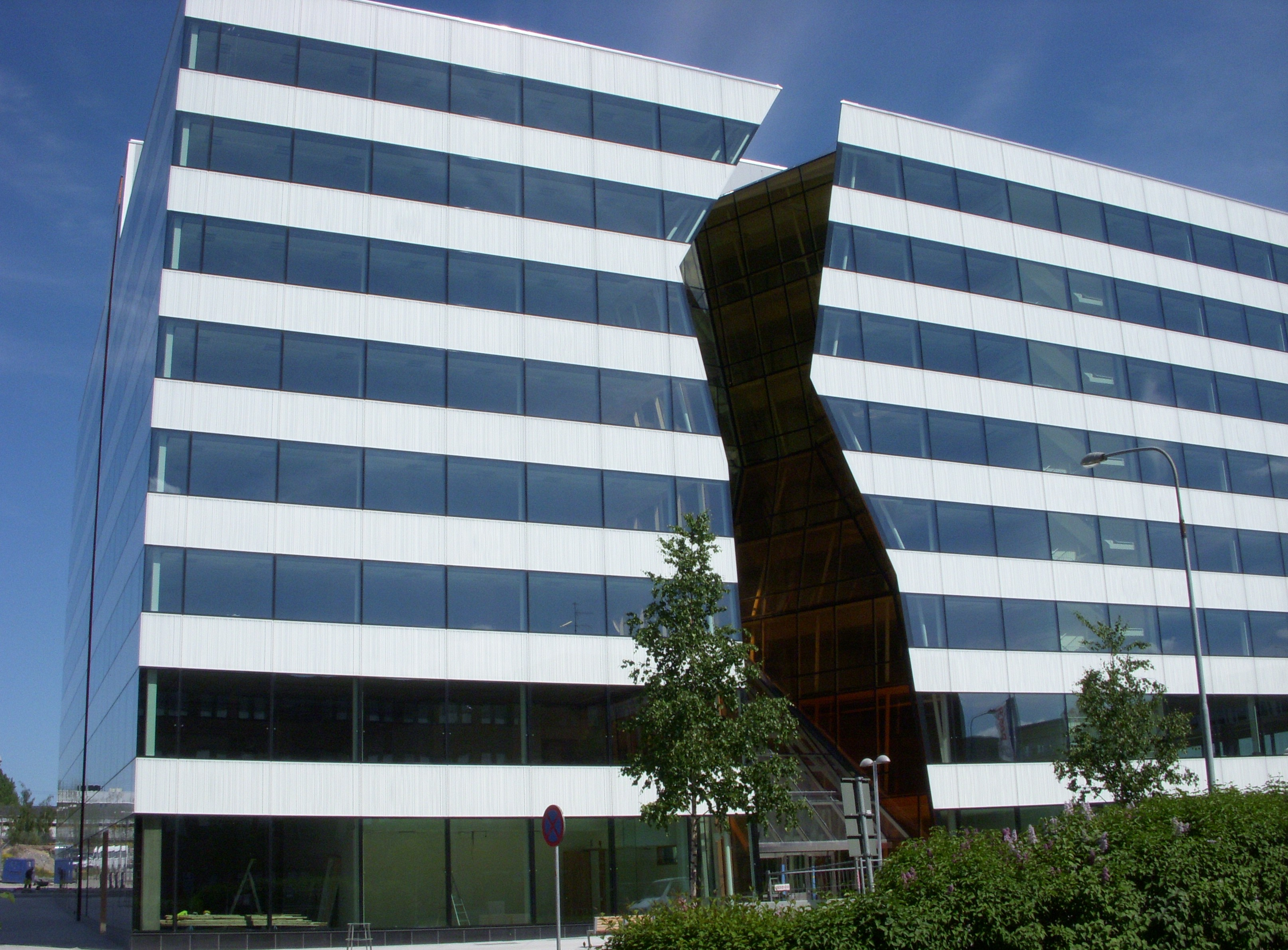
House 10 office block in Kista, Sweden

Department store K:fem in Vällingby, Sweden
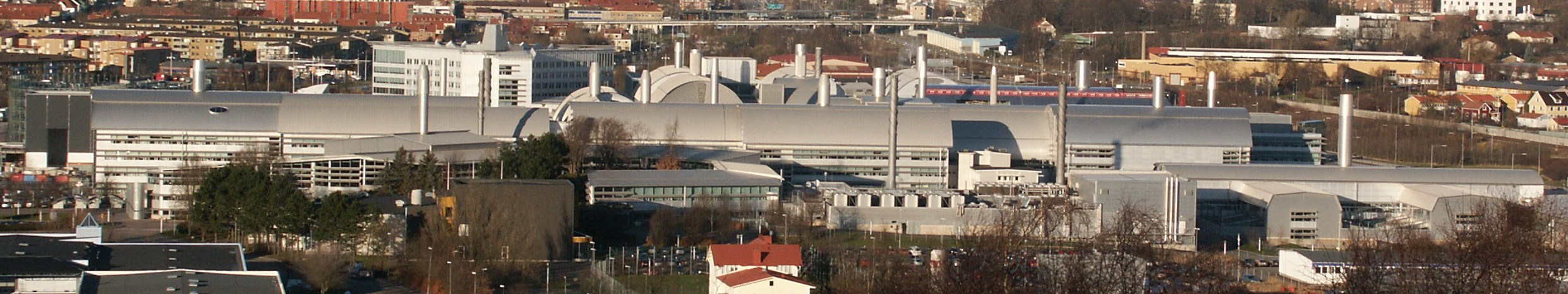
Astra Zeneca R&D Site, Mölndal

== Personal life ==
Wingårdh still lives in metropolitan Gothenburg, near Marstrand in Kungälv Municipality with his family. His home, an old cottage in the picturesque setting of an ancient village, contrasts sharply with the modernist style and skyscrapers with squares and sharp edges that he designs in his professional life.

== Notes and references ==
=== Selected books about Gert Wingårdh ===
- Gert Wingårdh, architect, by Rasmus Waern (Birkhäuser Publishers for Architecture, 2001)
- Nordic by Nature, by Stefan Ostrowski (Natur & Kultur, 2001)
- Gert Wingårdh; Thirty Years of Architecture, Mikael Nanfeldt (ed.) (Birkhäuser Publishers for Architecture, 2008)
- Crucial Words. Conditions for Contemporary Architecture, Gert Wingårdh and Rasmus Waern (ed.) (Birkhäuser Publishers for Architecture, 2008)
- Falk Jaeger: "Wingårdhs", JOVIS Verlag Berlin 2010, ISBN 978-3-86859-035-7
