= Sven-Harry's Art Museum =

Art museum in Stockholm, Sweden

Coordinates: 59.3396°N 18.0440°E

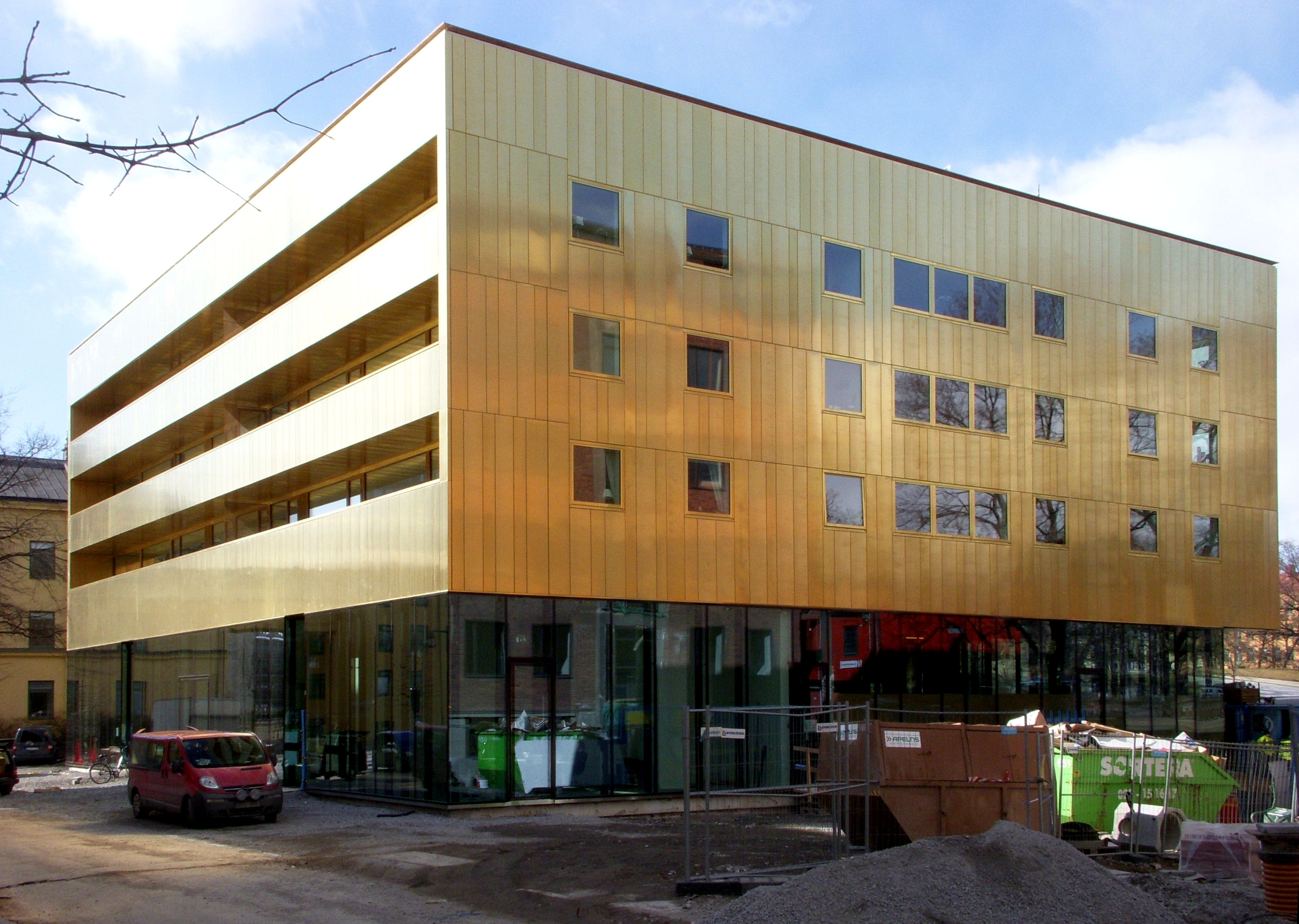

- Location within Stockholm
- Established: 27 March 2011
- Location: Stockholm, Sweden
- Type: Art museum
- Website: www.sven-harrys.se/en/

Sven-Harry's Art Museum (Swedish: Sven-Harrys Konstmuseum) is an art museum in Stockholm, Sweden, founded by builder Sven-Harry Karlsson. It is housed in a multi-purpose building alongside an art gallery, museum shop, apartments, and businesses.

== History ==
The award-winning Swedish builder Sven-Harry Karlsson (b. 1931) has been an art collector since the mid-1960s, forming a collection including work by Carl Fredrik Hill, Helene Schjerfbeck, Ernst Josephson, August Strindberg, Edvard Munch, Anders Zorn, and others. He constructed a building to house his collection in Vasaparken in Stockholm's inner city. Designed by Gert Wingårdh and Anna Höglund of Wingårdh Architects, the 5-story building is clad in a gold-tinted copper-aluminium-zinc alloy designed not to darken when exposed to oxygen. It opened in 2011 and is now owned and run by a foundation. Vanessa Gandy is Museum Director and CEO of Sven-Harrys Art Museum, since July 2026.

In addition to Sven-Harry's Art Museum, the building houses an art gallery, a museum shop, a restaurant and other businesses, and 18 apartments in its 5,000 square metres (54,000 sq ft). The museum is located at the top of the building and its interior spaces are designed as a replica of Sven-Harry Karlsson's former home in Lidingö, which dated back to the 1770s. The art gallery, which is about 400 square metres (4,300 sq ft), is divided into three major halls split between the ground floor and the fourth floor. It exhibits work by artists such as Karin Mamma Andersson and Torsten Andersson. The remainder of the ground floor is taken up by commercial enterprises.
