= Emporia (shopping mall) =

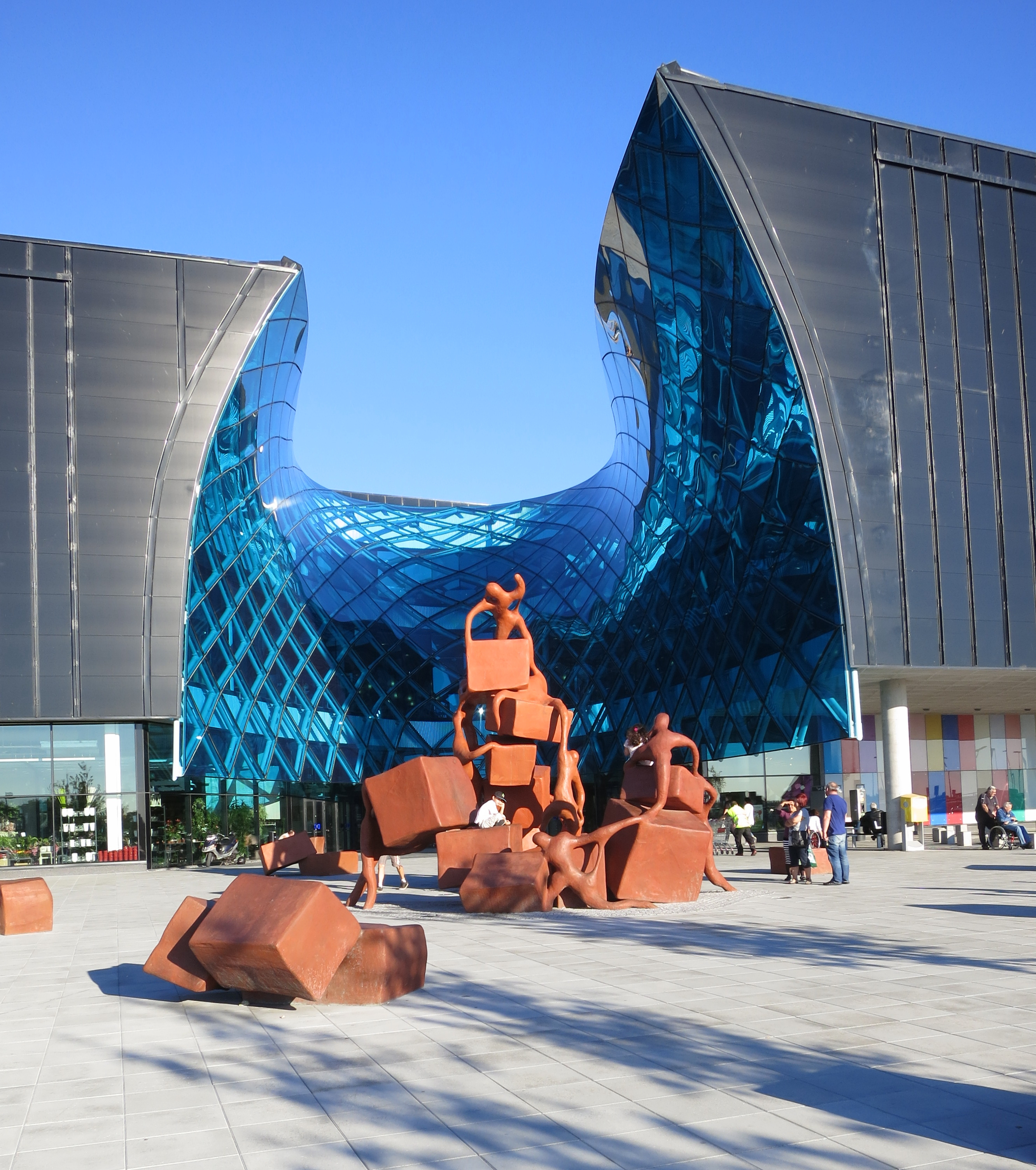
- Emporia seen from west.
- Location: Malmö, Sweden
- Coordinates: 55°33′51″N 12°58′23″E
- Address: Hyllie Boulevard 19; 215 32 Malmö
- Opened: 25 October 2012
- Owner: Steen & Strøm
- Architect: Gert Wingårdh (Wingårdh arkitektkontor)
- Num. of stores: 220
- Floor area: 65,000 m^{2} (700,000 sq ft)
- Floors: 4
- Parking: 3,200
- Public transit: Hyllie railway station
- Website: www.emporia.se

Emporia is a shopping mall located in the Hyllie city district of Malmö, Sweden. It is one of Scandinavia's biggest shopping malls and is situated next to Malmö Arena and the Hyllie railway station. Emporia opened on 25 October 2012 with total construction expenses of about 2 billion Swedish kronor. The architect of the Emporia project is Gert Wingårdh of Wingårdh arkitektkontor. Klepierre owns the building.

The building has been decorated with sound design and soundscapes created by Radja Sound Design Agency.

== Facts and figures ==
In terms of stores, Emporia, with its 220 stores, is among the largest shopping centers in Scandinavia.

Approximately 200 shops are located in Emporia, with a total area of 93,000 m^{2}. The mall is three stories topped with a roof terrace measuring 27,000 m^{2}, equivalent to approximately four soccer fields. The interior of the mall is divided into color-themed zones such as "Sea", "Forest", and "Amber". In total, the mall employs around 3,000 people. According to Emporia, they have around 25,000 visitors per day.

The main glass roof was built by the French company Saint-Gobain. The center received BREEAM environmental certification for sustainable building design.

Emporia won the award for best shopping center at the World Architecture Festival 2013.

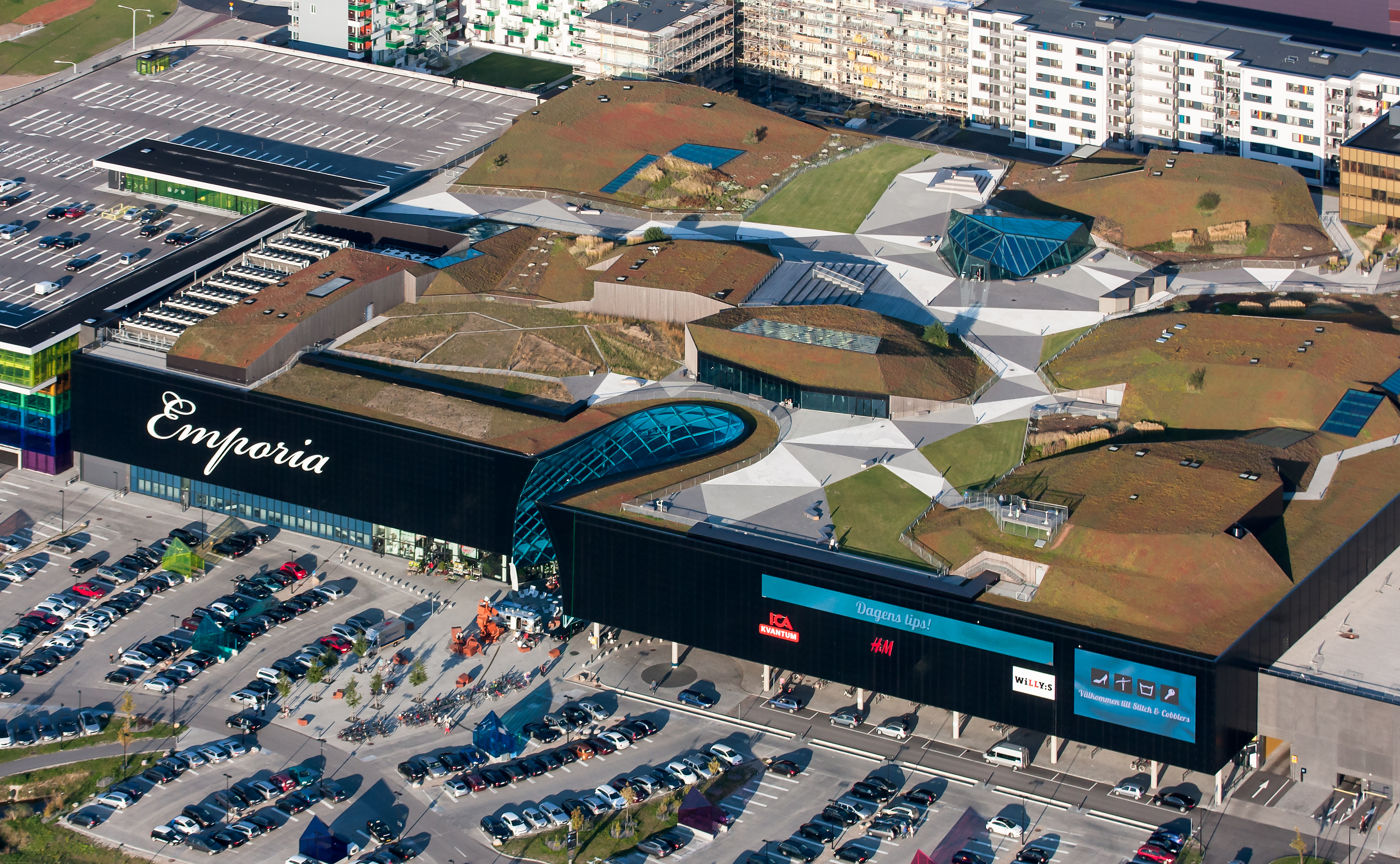
Emporia from the sky (2014)

== 2022 shooting ==
2022 Emporia shooting
- CCTV still of the shooting
- Location: Emporia, Malmö, Sweden
- Date: August 19, 2022
- Target: Satudarah MC leader
- Attack type: Assassination
- Weapon: 9mm CZ 75 handgun
- Deaths: 1
- Injuries: 1
- Perpetrators: 15-year-old boy
- Motive: Order from the Alzuriey network

On August 19, 2022, a 31-year-old leader of the Satudarah MC gang was shot dead inside the Emporia shopping mall in Malmö. The man, who had recently testified in a gang-related trial and had a long history of serious criminal charges, was at the mall with family and friends when the 15-year-old perpetrator opened fire near a clothing store. The man was hit by five bullets and died at the scene. A Norwegian woman was also struck by gunfire but survived. The shooting triggered panic among hundreds of shoppers, and police quickly stormed the building.

The teenage shooter, who was on the run from a state youth care facility (SIS, under compulsory LVU care), was arrested minutes later while trying to get into a taxi. A gun was found hidden in his waistband. His arrest led police to a weapons stash in Malmö containing firearms, explosives, and narcotics. Four additional people were arrested there.

Investigators concluded that the murder had been ordered by others in the Alzuriey network. The shooter claimed he acted on his own, but the court dismissed this as an after-the-fact fabrication.

In September 2023, the now 16-year-old perpetrator was sentenced to four years in secure youth detention, the maximum penalty for minors in Sweden, for murder, aggravated firearms offenses, endangering others, and minor drug crimes. The court noted the killing was carefully planned, particularly ruthless, and equivalent to life imprisonment had the offender been an adult. In October 2023, a man was sentenced to life imprisonment for inciting murder, but the sentence was changed in November 2024 to 15.5 years for, among other things, aiding and abetting murder. In the 2023 trial, a third person was acquitted, but that sentence was also changed in November 2024 to aiding and abetting murder with a sentence of 10 years in prison and then deportation.

== Gallery ==
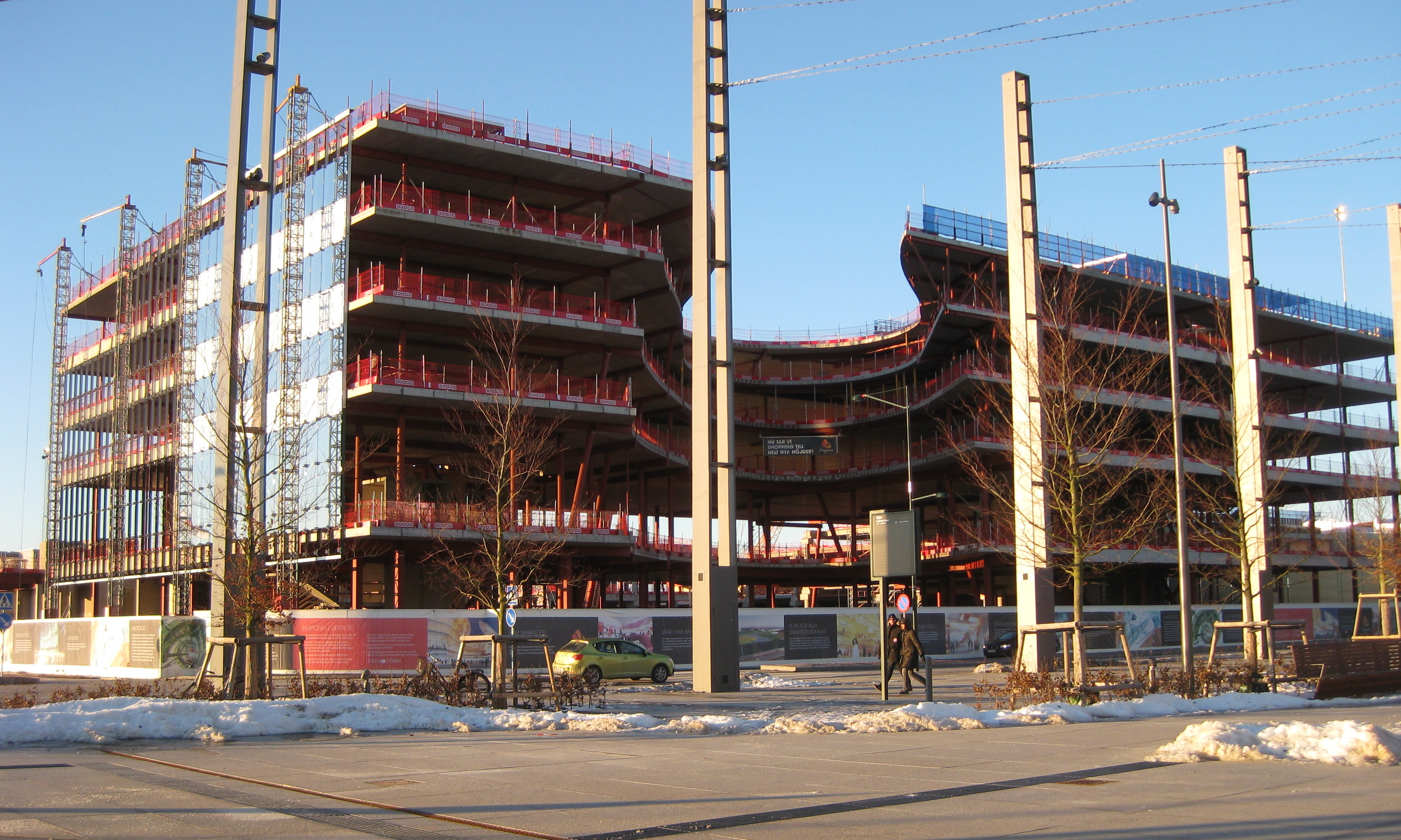
Under construction, December 2010

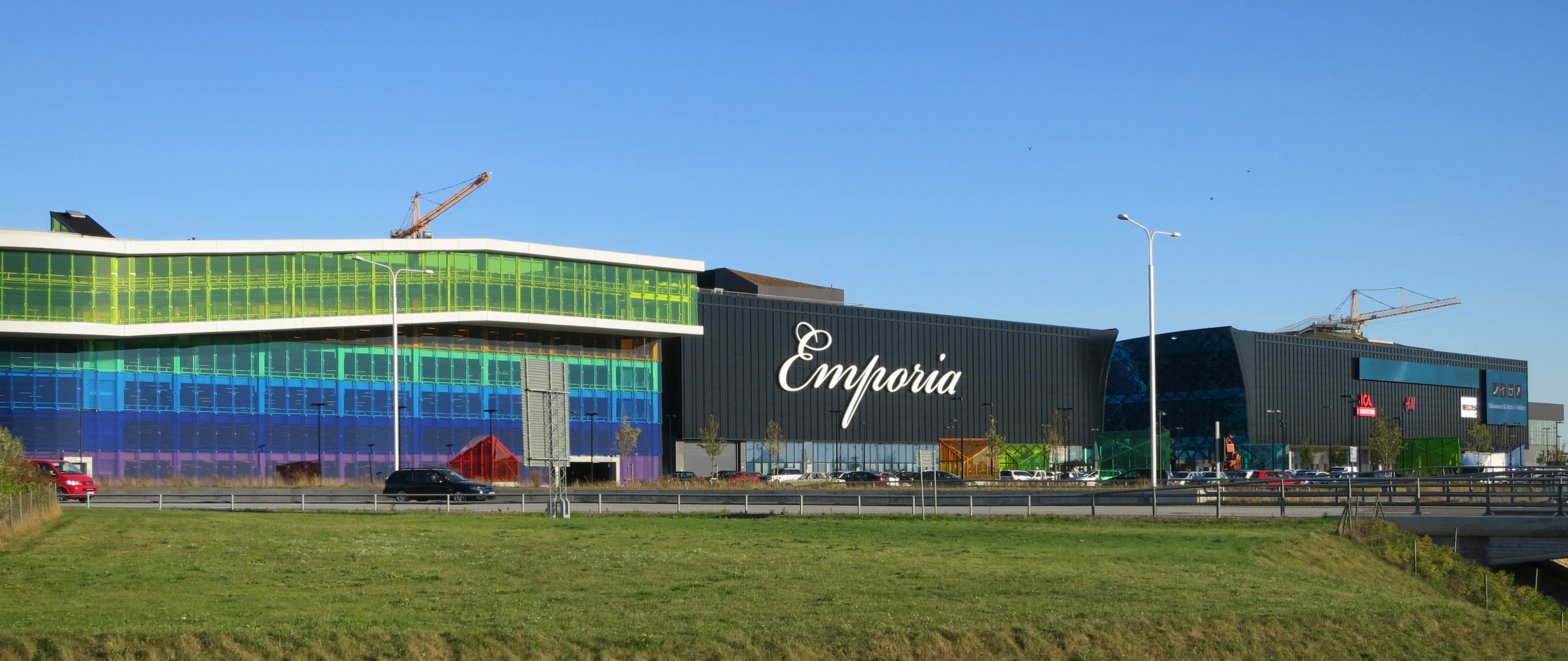
Emporia seen from north

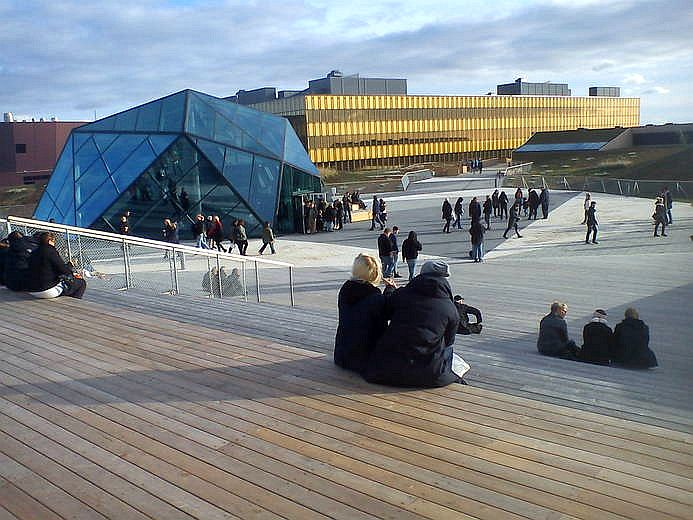
The roofpark

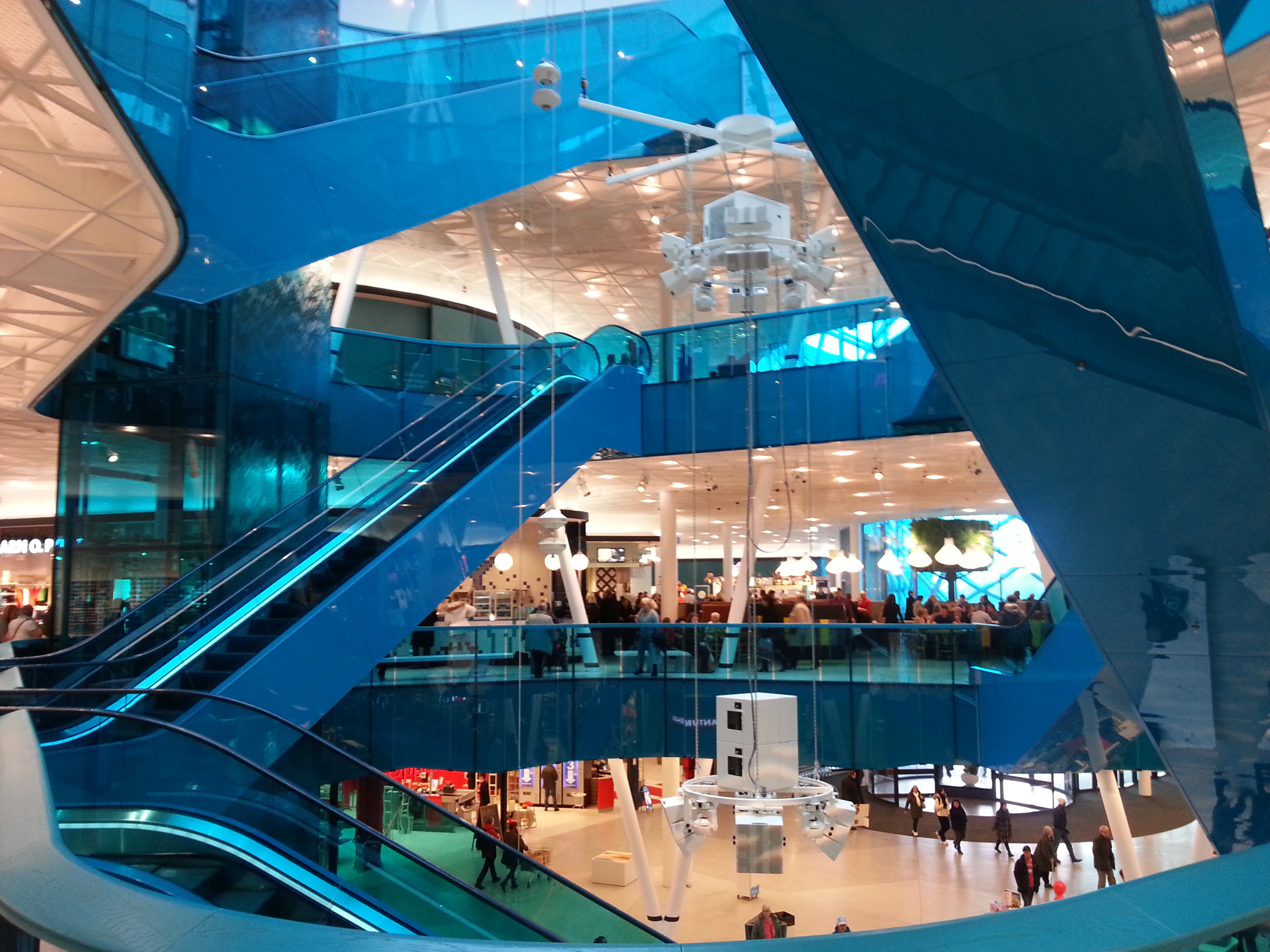
The Sea Square
