= Müritzeum =

Zoo in Mecklenburg-Vorpommern, Germany

Coordinates: 53°30′54″N 12°41′04″E

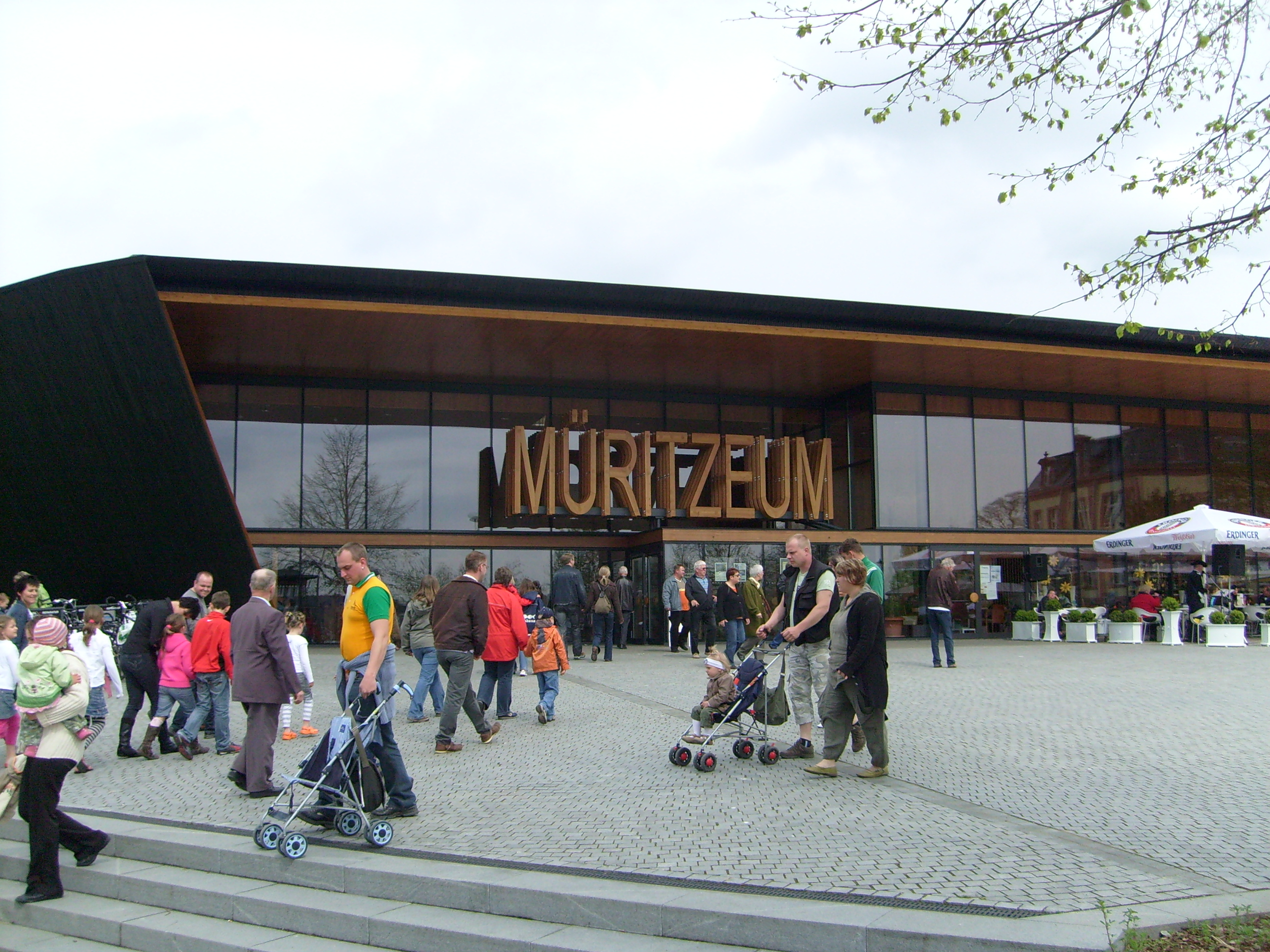
The Müritzeum at the Herrensee in Waren (Müritz)

Müritzeum, Müritz

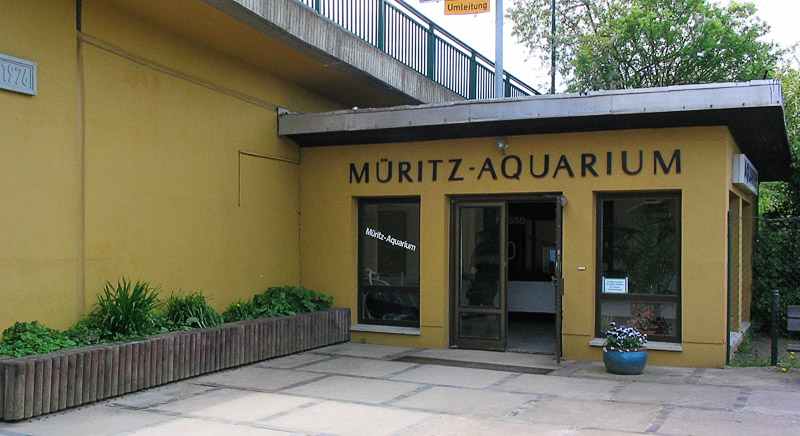
Müritz Aquarium – with the Müritz Museum, origin of the Müritzeum

The Müritzeum is a visitor centre and nature discovery centre for the Müritz National Park, located on Lake Müritz, near the town of Waren in the north German state of Mecklenburg-Vorpommern.

The concept of the visitor centre is to have an "enjoyable and interactive science-based approach" to the themes of nature and regional history. The exhibition and aquarium area is devoted to the presentation of the flora and fauna and history of the Mecklenburg Lake District. Its centrepiece is the largest aquarium for native freshwater fish in Germany, with a capacity of 100,000 litres. More than 40 aquatic species may be seen in the 25 aquaria, with almost all of Mecklenburg's native species, including rare crustacea and turtles. Thematic exhibition areas cover the underwater world, birds, forests, the region's history and the moor. The 1000-year-old oaks at Ivenack, the fieldstone church and estate villages form other topics in the exhibition. There is also an adventure garden and adventure playground. The film in the site's multi-vision cinema gives overview on the checkered history of Mecklenburg.

The foundation stone of the 13 million euro and 2,000-square-metre building was laid on 14 December 2005. The first phase was completed in June 2006 and it was opened on 2 August 2007. The building is entirely covered with charred (angekohlt) larch wood. Just as the Mecklenburg Lake District is known as the "Land of a Thousand Lakes", the Müritzeum describes itself as the "House of a Thousand Lakes". As a visitor centre, the Müritzeum provides information for visitors and tourists about the cultural and tourist attractions of the Mecklenburg Lake District and the Müritz National Park.

The Müritzeum is supported by the collections of the Müritz Museum, with its 140-year history, the Natural History Collection of the State of Mecklenburg-Vorpommern and the Müritz Aquarium. The Müritz Museum was the precursor of the Müritzeum. In 1866, the first collection was created when Hermann von Maltzan founded as the Maltzan Natural History Museum for Mecklenburg (Maltzan`sches Naturhistorisches Museums für Mecklenburg) or Maltzaneum for short.

At the Müritzeum, as part of the Natural History State Collection of Mecklenburg-Vorpommern, are about 275,000 exhibits, especially molluscs, insects, eggs, bird specimens, antlers and a geological collection. The library of approximately 16,000 volumes, mainly focuses on "Mecklenburgica" and scientific literature on botany, zoology, geology and natural history.

== Design ==
The building was designed by Swedish architect Gert Wingårdh. The architect explains the building: "Two cones, slightly shifted in plan, shape the building. The circular form opens up, by sharp cuts, with the entrance cutting as the most prominent...The floating character of the building corresponds to the setting on the lake."
