= House of Sweden =

Building in Washington, DC

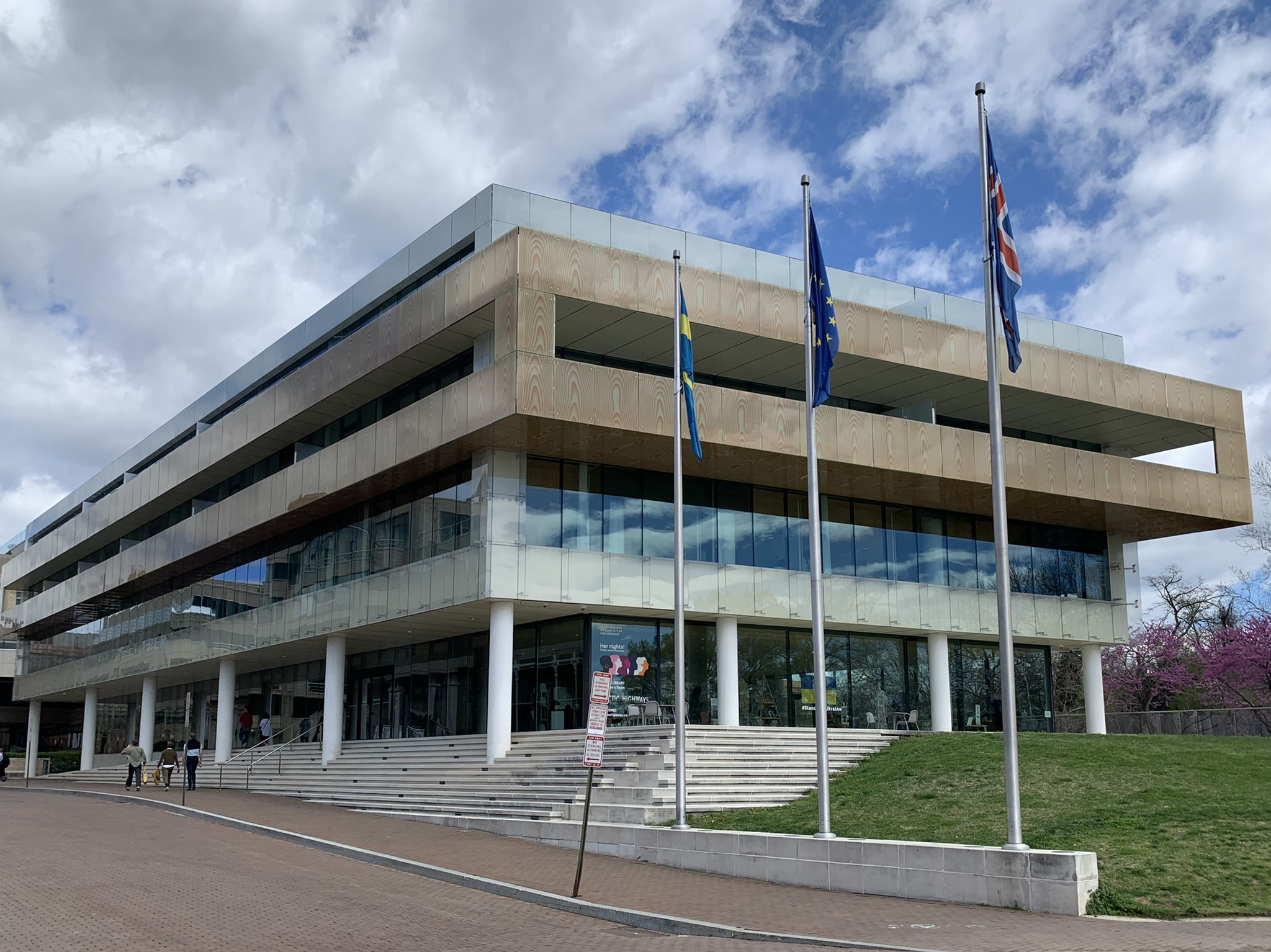
- Location: Washington, D.C.
- Address: 2900 K Street N.W.
- Coordinates: 38°54′5.29″N 77°3′31.88″W
- Ambassador: Sweden: Urban Ahlin; Iceland: Gudmundur Stefansson

The House of Sweden is a building in Washington, D.C., which hosts the Embassy of Sweden, the Embassy of Iceland, and the Representation of the Faroe Islands to the United States. The building is located at 2900 K Street N.W. in the Georgetown neighborhood.

Apart from the embassies, the building, which is owned by the Swedish state through its National Property Board, also houses representatives of Swedish commerce. Facilities include a secretariat, exhibition space, 19 corporate office suites, and a high-tech business event center.

== Building ==
The building was designed by the Swedish architects Gert Wingårdh and Tomas Hansen, with John Jessen of VOA Associates in Washington, D.C., as architect of record. It has five floors and a total surface of 7,500 square metres (81,000 sq ft). The front of the building is glass. Construction began in August 2004 and completed in the summer of 2006. The embassy moved into the building at the beginning of August 2006. Previously the embassy was housed in rented space, first at Watergate 600, and later at 1501 M Street N.W.

The House of Sweden is designed in the modernist style, with many Scandinavian design elements; in addition to glass, the building features use of white stone and blond maple materials.

The building was inaugurated on October 23, 2006, by King Carl XVI Gustaf and Queen Silvia. Also present at the inauguration were Minister for Foreign Affairs Carl Bildt and Ambassador of Sweden to the United States Gunnar Lund. The Swedish rock band The Ark performed at the ceremony.

Gert Wingårdh received the Swedish national architecture award—the Kasper Salin Prize—for House of Sweden in 2007.

== See also ==
- Foreign relations of the Faroe Islands
- List of diplomatic missions of Iceland
- List of diplomatic missions of Sweden
- Iceland–United States relations
- List of ambassadors of Sweden to the United States
- Sweden–United States relations
- Architecture of Washington, D.C.
