= Kuggen =

Building in Gothenburg, Sweden

- Kuggen
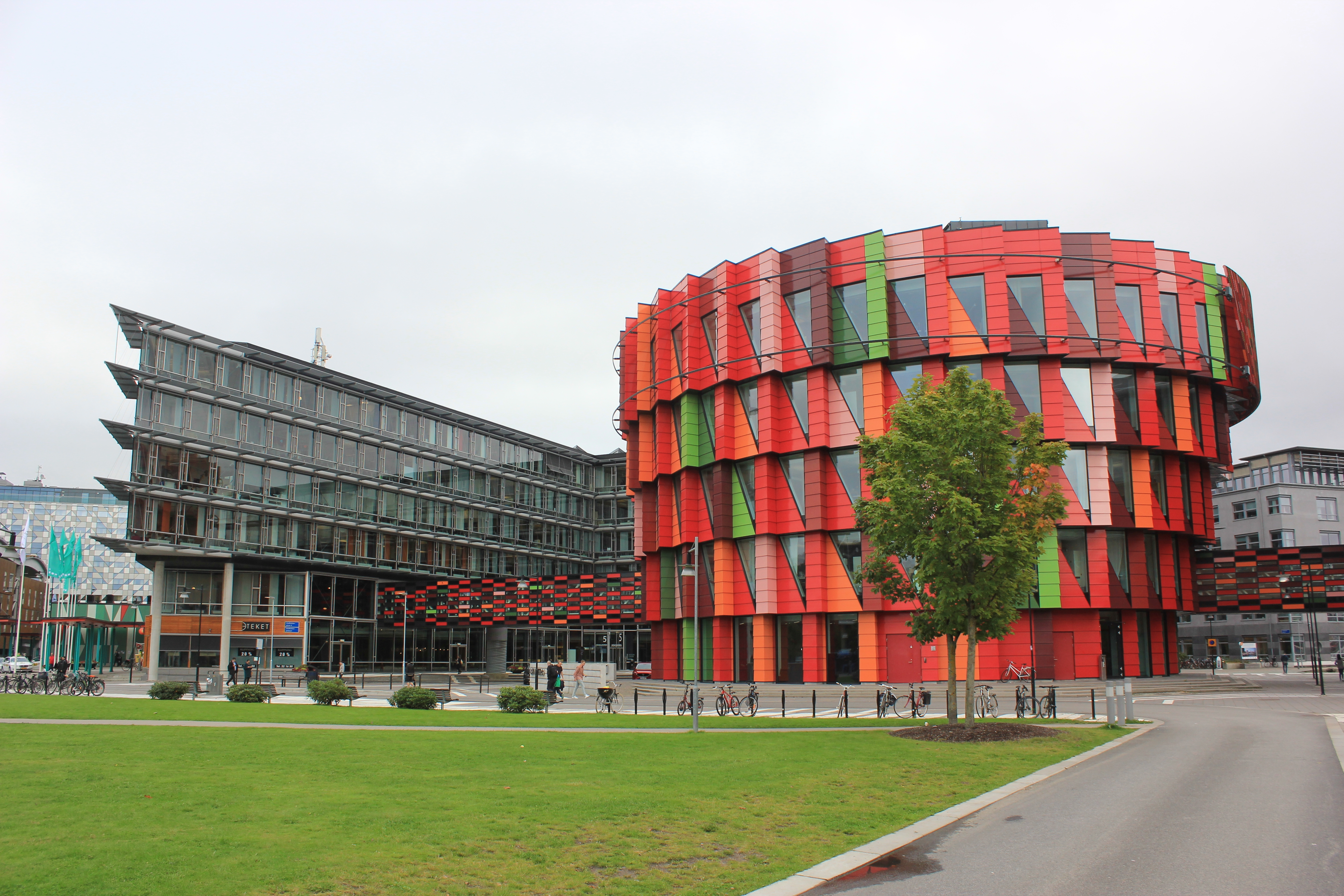

- Location within Västra Götaland

General information
- Type: Office building
- Location: Lindholmsplatsen 1, Gothenburg, Sweden
- Coordinates: 57.706753°N 11.938886°E
- Construction started: October 2010
- Completed: March 2011
- Landlord: Chalmersfastigheter AB

Technical details
- Structural system: Concrete framing
- Floor count: 5 floors and cellar
- Floor area: 5,350 sqm
- Lifts/elevators: 1

Design and construction
- Architects: Gert Wingårdh, Jonas Edblad Charlotte Erdegard and Danuta Nielsen
- Architecture firm: Wingårdh Arkitektkontor
- Structural engineer: Tyréns
- Main contractor: Peab
- Awards and prizes: MIPIM Sustainability award (2009)

Kuggen (Swedish for 'the (cogwheel) cog') is a building owned by real estate company Chalmersfastigheter as part of Chalmers University of Technology in Gothenburg, Sweden. It was designed by Wingårdh arkitektkontor. Construction started in October 2010 and completed in March 2011. The building is located on the Lindholmen campus and is connected to the neighboring buildings Jupiter and Science Park by two walkways on the first floor. The Kuggen building serves as an academic link between Lindholmen and companies in fields such as mobile data communications and media design.

== Design ==
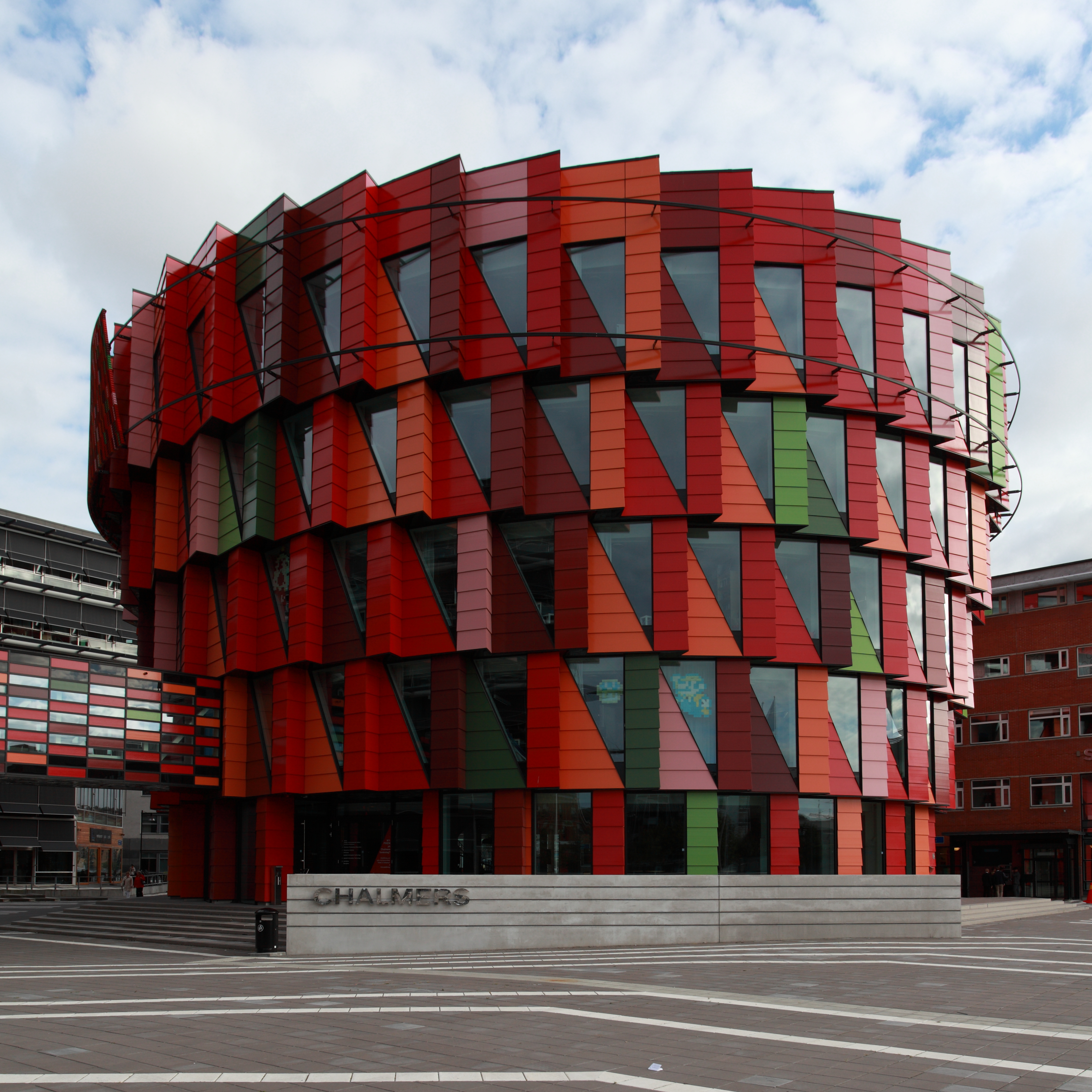
Front view of Kuggen

The exterior is made of six different shades of red and two shades of green. The building is finished in a glazed terracotta. ”Kuggen” is circular to minimize the ratio between skin and area. Each floor adds two bays, causing the building to grow larger in size for each additional floor. The center of each circle shifts so the southern elevation gets the longest shadow. A movable sunscreen tracks the sun and contributes to the shade of the two top floors, while nearby buildings cast their shadows on the lower levels.

A Science Park occupies the lower floors, while the second floor is designated for public use and can serve as an exhibition space. The upper floors are reserved for commercial office use.

== Green building ==
Kuggen makes use of green building technology on six different levels: adaptive ventilation; adaptive lighting; interactive heating and cooling systems; photovoltaic cells integrated into a screen system that provides additional shade and electricity; a roof-mounted array of sun collectors that aid the heating tap water; and effective daylighting. The ceramic panels used for the facade were chosen for their longevity. The windows are triangular allowing daylight to follow the ceiling deep into the building while staying at a low ratio (30%) of the elevation surface. The result is a building that aims to limit energy consumption to 60 kWh/m2 per year—well below what is considered a green building—while providing temperature within individual offices between 22 and 26 degrees Celsius.

== Awards ==
- MIPIM Sustainability award (2009)
- Nominated in the category "Learning" for the World Architecture Festival 2011 in Barcelona.
