= List of World Architecture Festival winners =

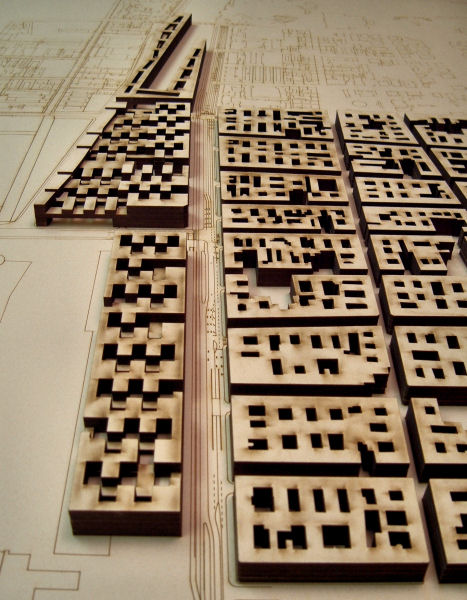
First International Architecture Model Festival Budapest

This is a list of awards, winners and commendations awarded by the international World Architecture Festival (WAF).

== History ==
In 2008, all listed projects were declared award winners. Beginning in 2009, only five projects per year received official awards.

The list is compiled from the official websites of the World Architecture Festival and World Buildings Directory. Where there was a discrepancy between the information on the project page and the winner list from WAF (World Architecture Festival), the information from the WAF list was used. All project names are spelled as they appear in the WAF list; as a result, links may lead to articles with different spellings. In some cases, the projects were renamed after receiving the award. The note to the list contains a link to the project page with the World Buildings Directory and is sorted in the same sequence as in the winner lists published by the World Architecture Festival.

== Complete list of winners ==
Sortable table
Picture	Year	Award	Category	Project name	Location	Architect	Architect location
	2008	Award winner	Civic (Note: Award winner of category Civic: "GZBICC – Guangzhou Baiyun International Convention Center, China". World Buildings Directory. Archived from the original on 5 November 2013.)	GZBICC – Guangzhou Baiyun International Convention Center	China, Guangzhou	BURO II – CITIC	Belgium (Brussels – Guangzhou) & Belgium
	2008	Award winner	Culture (Note: Award winner of category Culture: "Oslo Operahouse, Oslo, Norway". World Buildings Directory. Archived from the original on 31 December 2013.)	Oslo Operahouse	Norway, Oslo	Snøhetta	Norway
	2008	Award winner	Energy, Waste & Recycling (Note: Award winner of category Energy, Waste & Recycling: "Landscape Restoration of the Controlled Rubbish Dump "La Vall d'en Joan", El Garraf, Spain". World Buildings Directory. Archived from the original on 31 December 2013.)	Landscape Restoration of the Controlled Rubbish Dump "La Vall d'en Joan"	Spain, El Garraf	Batlle & Roig Architects	Spain (Esplugues de LLobregat)
	2008	Award winner	Health (Note: Award winner of category Health: "Centre pour le Bien-être des Femmes et la prévention des mutilations génitales féminines 'G.Kambou', Ouagadougou, Burkina Faso". World Buildings Directory. Archived from the original on 5 November 2013.)	Centre pour le Bien-être des Femmes et la prévention des mutilations génitales féminines 'G.Kambou'	Burkina Faso, Ouagadougou	FAREstudio	Italy (Rome)
	2008	Award winner	Holiday (Note: Award winner of category Holiday: "Nk'Mip Desert Cultural Centre, Osoyoos, Canada". World Buildings Directory. Archived from the original on 8 January 2015.)	Nk'Mip Desert Cultural Centre	Canada, Osoyoos	Hotson Bakker Boniface Haden Architects	
	2008	Award winner	Housing (Note: Award winner of category Housing: "Mountain Dwellings, Copenhagen S, Denmark". World Buildings Directory. Archived from the original on 19 January 2015.)	Mountain Dwellings	Denmark, Copenhagen S	BIG – Bjarke Ingels Group	Denmark (Copenhagen N)
	2008	Award winner Building of the Year	Learning (Note: Award winner: Building of the Year and winner of category Learning: "Universita Luigi Bocconi, Milano, Italy". World Buildings Directory. Archived from the original on 31 December 2013.)	Universita Luigi Bocconi	Italy, Milan	Grafton Architects	Ireland (Dublin 2)
	2008	Award winner	Nature (Note: Award winner of category Nature: "Olympic Sculpture Park, Seattle Art Museum, Seattle, United States of America". World Buildings Directory. Archived from the original on 17 December 2014.)	Olympic Sculpture Park, Seattle Art Museum	United States, Seattle	Weiss/Manfredi Architecture/Landscape/Urbanism	United States (New York)
	2008	Award winner	New & Old (Note: Award winner of category New & Old: "Robert and Arlene Kogod Courtyard, Smithsonian Institution, Washington D.C., United States of America". World Buildings Directory. Archived from the original on 14 July 2014.)	Robert and Arlene Kogod Courtyard, Smithsonian Institution	United States, Washington D.C.	Foster + Partners	
	2008	Award winner	Office (Note: Award winner of category Office: "Duoc Corporate Building, Santiago, Chile". World Buildings Directory. Archived from the original on 5 November 2013.)	Duoc Corporate Building	Chile, Santiago	Sabbagh Arquitectos	Chile (Santiago)
	2008	Award winner	Pleasure (Note: Award winner of category Pleasure: "Sheep Stable, Almere, Netherlands". World Buildings Directory. Archived from the original on 5 November 2013.)	Sheep Stable	Netherlands, Almere	70F Architecture	Netherlands (Almere)
	2008	Award winner	Production (Note: Award winner of category Production: "BMW Welt – Event, Exhibition and Automobile Delivery Center, Munich, Germany". World Buildings Directory. Archived from the original on 5 November 2013.)	BMW Welt – Event, Exhibition and Automobile Delivery Center	Germany, Munich	Coop Himmelb(l)au Wolf D. Prix & Partner ZT GmbH	Austria (Vienna)
	2008	Award winner	Religion & Contemplation (Note: Award winner of category Religion & Contemplation: "Dornbusch church, Frankfurt, Germany". World Buildings Directory. Archived from the original on 31 December 2013.)	Dornbusch church	Germany, Frankfurt	Meixner Schlüter Wendt Architekten	Germany (Frankfurt am Main)
	2008	Award winner	Sport (Note: Award winner of category Sport: "Sports Hall Bale, Bale, Croatia". World Buildings Directory. Archived from the original on 31 December 2013.)	Sports Hall Bale	Croatia, Bale	3LHD Architects	Croatia (Zagreb)
	2008	Award winner	Shopping (Note: Award winner of category Shopping: "K:fem, Stockholm, Sweden". World Buildings Directory. Archived from the original on 31 December 2013.)	K:fem	Sweden, Stockholm	Wingårdh Arkitektkontor AB	Sweden
	2008	Award winner	Private House (Note: Award winner of category Private House: "Final Wooden House, Japan". World Buildings Directory. Archived from the original on 10 April 2014.)	Final Wooden House	Japan	Sou Fujimoto Architects	Japan (Nakano)
	2008	Award winner	Transport (Note: Award winner of category Transport: "Nordpark Cable Railway, Austria". World Buildings Directory. Archived from the original on 5 November 2013.)	Nordpark Cable Railway	Austria	Zaha Hadid Architects	United Kingdom (London)
	2009	Award winner: World Building of the Year	Culture, Completed Buildings (Note: Award winner: World Building of the Year and winner of category culture: "Mapungubwe Interpretation Center, South Africa". World Buildings Directory. Archived from the original on 16 October 2013.)	Mapungubwe Museum and Interpretive Centre	South Africa	Peter Rich Architects	South Africa (Johannesburg )
	2009	Award winner: Future Project of the Year	Cultural, Future Projects (Note: Award winner: Future Project of the Year and winner of category Cultural: "Spanish Pavilion for 2010 Expo Shanghai, China". World Buildings Directory. Archived from the original on 30 June 2014.)	Spanish Pavilion for 2010 Expo Shanghai	China	Miralles Tagliabue EMBT	Spain (Barcelona)
	2009	Award winner: Interiors and Fit Out Overall Winner	Interiors and Fit Out – Retail (small) (Note: Award winner category Interiors and Fit Out – Retail (small): "Corian Super-Surfaces Showroom, Milano, Italy". World Buildings Directory. Archived from the original on 5 November 2013.)	Corian Super-Surfaces Showroom	Italy, Milano	Architect Amanda Levete Architects	United Kingdom (London)
	2009	Award winner: Structural Design of the Year	Structural Design – Spans (e.g. bridges, stadiums, big sheds) (Note: Award winner category Structural Design – Spans (eg bridges, stadiums, big sheds) : "ARENA ZAGREB, Zagreb, Croatia". World Buildings Directory. Archived from the original on 20 February 2012.)	ARENA ZAGREB	Croatia, Zagreb	Architect UPI-2M	Croatia
	2009	Award winner: Student design competition	Student design competition: Distressed Cities, Creative Responses (Note: Award winner category Student design competition: "AECOM Design + Planning Urban SOS, Mumbai, India". World Buildings Directory. Archived from the original on 28 December 2011.)	AECOM Design + Planning Urban SOS	India, Mumbai	Sabrina Kleinenhammans, a graduate at MIT	United States, Massachusetts Institute of Technology (MIT)
	2009	Category Winner, Completed Buildings	Civic and community (Note: Winner of category Civic and community : "Emergency Terminal Zagreb, Zagreb, Croatia". World Buildings Directory. Archived from the original on 5 November 2013.)	Emergency Terminal Zagreb	Croatia, Zagreb	Produkcija 004	Croatia (Zagreb)
	2009	Category Winner, Completed Buildings	Display (Note: Winner of category Display: "CAGES FOR MACAWS IN THE PALM GROVE OF BARCELONA ZOO, Barcelona, Spain". World Buildings Directory. Archived from the original on 10 February 2014.)	CAGES FOR MACAWS IN THE PALM GROVE OF BARCELONA ZOO	Spain, Barcelona	Batlle & Roig Architects	Spain (Esplugues de LLobregat)
	2009	Category Winner, Completed Buildings	Health (Note: Winner of category Health: "TELETON TAMPICO, Tampico, Mexico". World Buildings Directory. Archived from the original on 5 November 2013.)	TELETON TAMPICO	Mexico, Tampico	Sordo Madaleno Arquitectos	Mexico (Distrito Federal)
	2009	Category Winner, Completed Buildings	Holiday (Note: Winner of category Holiday: "Restaurant Tusen, Ramundberget, Sweden". World Buildings Directory. Archived from the original on 5 November 2013.)	Restaurant Tusen	Sweden, Ramundberget	Murman Arkitekter ab	Sweden (Stockholm)
	2009	Category Winner, Completed Buildings	House (Note: Winner of category House: "Klein Bottle House, Rye, Australia". World Buildings Directory. Archived from the original on 5 November 2013.)	Klein Bottle House	Australia, Rye	McBride Charles Ryan	Australia (Prahran)
	2009	Category Winner, Completed Buildings	Housing (inc mixed use) (Note: Winner of category Housing (inc mixed use): "The Met, Bangkok, Thailand". World Buildings Directory. Archived from the original on 20 February 2012.)	The Met	Thailand, Bangkok	WOHA	Singapore (Singapore)
	2009	Category Winner, Completed Buildings	Landscape (Note: Winner of category Landscape: "The Adaptation Palettes: Regenerative Landscape Design, Tianjin, China". World Buildings Directory. Archived from the original on 5 November 2013.)	The Adaptation Palettes: Regenerative Landscape Design	China, Tianjin	Kongjian Yu – Turenscape	China (Turenscape)
	2009	Category Winner, Completed Buildings	Learning (Note: Winner of category Learning: "The Pearl Academy of Fashion, Jaipur, Jaipur, India". World Buildings Directory. Archived from the original on 6 October 2011.)	The Pearl Academy of Fashion, Jaipur	India, Jaipur	Morphogenesis	India (New Delhi)
	2009	Category Winner, Completed Buildings	New and old (Note: Winner of category New and old: "TKTS Booth / Redevelopment of Father Duffy Square, New York, United States of America". World Buildings Directory. Archived from the original on 14 December 2014.)	TKTS Booth / Redevelopment of Father Duffy Square	United States, New York	Choi Ropiha, Perkins Eastman and William Fellows/PKSB Architects	Australia (Manly), United States and United States
	2009	Category Winner, Completed Buildings	Office (inc mixed use) (Note: Winner of category Office (inc mixed use): "Unileverhaus, Hamburg, Germany". World Buildings Directory. Archived from the original on 5 November 2013.)	Unileverhaus	Germany, Hamburg	Projektarbeitsgemeinschaft Behnisch Architekten	
	2009	Category Winner, Completed Buildings	Production, energy and recycling (Note: Winner of category Production, energy and recycling: "Bodegas Protos, Valladolid, Spain". World Buildings Directory. Archived from the original on 13 August 2011.)	Bodegas Protos	Spain, Valladolid	Rogers Stirk Harbour + Partners	London (United Kingdom)
	2009	Category Winner, Completed Buildings	Shopping (inc mixed use) (Note: Winner of category Shopping (inc mixed use) : "Havaianas, São Paulo, Brazil". World Buildings Directory. Archived from the original on 6 October 2011.)	Havaianas	Brazil, São Paulo	Isay Weinfeld	Brazil (São Paulo)
	2009	Category Winner, Completed Buildings	Sport (Note: Winner of category Sport: "Berry Sports Hall, Berry, Australia". World Buildings Directory. Archived from the original on 26 November 2009.)	Berry Sports Hall	Australia, Berry	Allen Jack+Cottier	Australia (Sydney)
	2009	Category Winner, Completed Buildings	Transport (Note: Winner of category Transport: "Bras Basah Mass Rapid Transit station, Singapore, Republic of Singapore". World Buildings Directory. Archived from the original on 20 February 2012.)	Bras Basah Mass Rapid Transit station	Singapore, Singapore	WOHA	Singapore (Singapore, )
	2009	Category Winner, Future Projects	Commercial (Note: Winner of category Commercial, Future Projects: "Statoil Hydro office, Oslo, Norway". World Buildings Directory. Archived from the original on 6 October 2011.)	Statoil Hydro office	Norway, Oslo	a-lab	Norway (Oslo)
	2009	Category Winner, Future Projects	Competition entries (Note: Winner of category Competition entries, Future Projects: "Szentendre Cemetery, Szentendre, Hungary". World Buildings Directory. Archived from the original on 2 January 2012.)	Szentendre Cemetery	Hungary, Szentendre	Architects A4 Studio, A4 Studio Kft	Hungary (Budapest)
	2009	Category Winner, Future Projects	Education (Note: Winner of category Education, Future Projects: "Malama Learning Center, Kapolei, United States of America". World Buildings Directory.)	Malama Learning Center	United States, Kapolei	Eight Inc.	Singapore (Singapore)
	2009	Category Winner, Future Projects	Experimental projects (Note: Winner of category Experimental projects, Future Projects: "Mobile Performance Venue, Norway". World Buildings Directory.)	Mobile Performance Venue	Norway	Various Architects AS	Norway
	2009	Category Winner, Future Projects	Health (Note: Winner of category Health, Future Projects: "Al Jalila Children's Specialty Hospital, Dubai, United Arab Emirates". World Buildings Directory. Archived from the original on 5 November 2013.)	Al Jalila Children's Specialty Hospital	United Arab Emirates, Dubai	Architects Studio Altieri Spa and Studio Altieri International	Italy (Thiene) and United Arab Emirates
	2009	Category Winner, Future Projects	Infrastructure, Future Projects – Masterplanning (Note: Winner of category Infrastructure, Future Projects – Masterplanning: "THINKING BEYOND THE STATION: AGUASCALIENTES CITY SUBURBAN TRAIN, MEXICO, Aguascalientes, Mexico". World Buildings Directory. Archived from the original on 5 November 2013.)	THINKING BEYOND THE STATION: AGUASCALIENTES CITY SUBURBAN TRAIN, MEXICO	Mexico, Aguascalientes	RVDG arquitectura+urbanismo	Mexico City (Mexico)
	2009	Category Winner, Future Projects	Landscape (Note: Winner of category Landscape, Future Projects: "East London Green Grid, London, United Kingdom". World Buildings Directory. Archived from the original on 5 November 2013.)	East London Green Grid	United Kingdom, London	Design for London	United Kingdom
	2009	Category Winner, Future Projects	Masterplanning (Note: Winner of category Masterplanning, Future Projects: "Our city – our urban spaces, København V, Denmark". World Buildings Directory. Archived from the original on 19 March 2012.)	Our city – our urban spaces	Denmark, København V	Entasis	Denmark (Copenhagen)
	2009	Category Winner, Future Projects	Holiday Resort Mero Beach Dominica (Note: Winner of category Residentia, Future Projects: "Mero Beach project Dominica, Dominica". World Buildings Directory. Archived from the original on 6 October 2011.)	Mero Beach project Dominica	Dominica	BURO II	
	2009	Commendation, Completed Buildings	Civic and community (Note: Commendation category Civic and community: "Jewish Reconstructionist Congregation Synagogue, Evanston, United States of America". World Buildings Directory. Archived from the original on 5 November 2013.)	Jewish Reconstructionist Congregation Synagogue	United States, Evanston	Ross Barney Architects	United States (Chicago)
	2009	Commendation, Completed Buildings	Civic and community (Note: Commendation category Civic and community: "La Cisnera Community Centre, Arico, Spain". World Buildings Directory. Archived from the original on 5 November 2013.)	La Cisnera Community Centre	Spain, Arico	GPY Arquitectos	Spain (Santa Cruz de Tenerife)
	2009	Commendation, Completed Buildings	Health (Note: Commendation category Health: "St Jozef community health center, Deventer, Netherlands". World Buildings Directory. Archived from the original on 5 November 2013.)	St Jozef community health center	Netherlands, Deventer	One Architecture	Netherlands (Amsterdam)
	2009	Commendation, Completed Buildings	House (Note: Commendation category House: "Chen House, Sanjhih, Taiwan". World Buildings Directory. Archived from the original on 9 July 2014.)	Chen House	Taiwan, Sanjhih	C-Laboratory	Finland (Turku)
	2009	Commendation, Completed Buildings	House (Note: Commendation category House: "Sliding House, Suffolk, United Kingdom". World Buildings Directory. Archived from the original on 5 November 2013.)	Sliding House	United Kingdom, Suffolk	RMM	United Kingdom (London)
	2009	Commendation, Completed Buildings	Health, Landscape (Note: Commendation category Health, Landscape: "Maggie's Centre London, London, United Kingdom". World Buildings Directory. Archived from the original on 5 November 2013.)	Maggie's Centre London (Note: Is listed as shortlisted on project page, but included as Commendation in complete list with World Architecture Festivals. Visited 6 July 2013.)	United Kingdom, London	Rogers Stirk Harbour + Partners	United Kingdom (London)
	2009	Commendation, Completed Buildings	Office (inc mixed use) (Note: Commendation category Office (inc mixed use): "Ironbank, Auckland, New Zealand". World Buildings Directory. Archived from the original on 5 November 2013.)	Ironbank	New Zealand, Auckland	RTA Studio	
	2009	Commendation, Future Projects	Commercial (Note: Commendation category Commercial, Future Projects: "Kuggen, Gothenburg, Sweden". World Buildings Directory. Archived from the original on 24 April 2012.)	Kuggen	Sweden, Gothenburg	Wingårdh Arkitektkontor AB	Sweden
	2009	Commendation, Future Projects	Commercial (Note: Commendation category Commercial, Future Projects: "Top Code, Imola (Bologna), Italy". World Buildings Directory.)	Top Code	Italy, Imola (Bologna)	Lelli & Associati Architettura and Cristofani Architetti	Italy (Faenza) and Italy
	2009	Commendation, Future Projects	Experimental projects (Note: Commendation category Experimental projects, Future Projects: "Timber Stadium, United Kingdom". World Buildings Directory. Archived from the original on 6 October 2011.)	Timber Stadium	United Kingdom	RMM	United Kingdom (London)
	2009	Commendation, Future Projects	Education, Future Projects – Infrastructure, Future Projects – Masterplanning (Note: Commendation category Education, Future Projects – Infrastructure, Future Projects – Masterplanning: "Grangegorman Masterplan, Grangegorman, Ireland". World Buildings Directory. Archived from the original on 5 November 2013.)	Grangegorman Masterplan	Ireland, Grangegorman	Moore Ruble Yudell Architects & Planners / DMOD	
	2009	Commendation, Future Projects	Residential (Note: Commendation category Residential, Future Projects: "360º Building, São Paulo, Brazil". World Buildings Directory. Archived from the original on 5 November 2013.)	360º Building	Brazil, São Paulo	Isay Weinfeld	Brazil (São Paulo)
	2009	Commendation, Future Projects	Residential (Note: Commendation category Residential, Future Projects: "Digby Road, London, United Kingdom". World Buildings Directory. Archived from the original on 16 June 2014.)	Digby Road	United Kingdom, London	Stephen Davy Peter Smith Architects	United Kingdom (London)
	2009	Commendation, Interiors and Fit Out	Culture, Interiors and Fit Out – Culture and civic, New and old (Note: Commendation category Culture, Interiors and Fit Out – Culture and civic, New and old: "The Great North Museum, Newcastle upon Tyne, United Kingdom". World Buildings Directory. Archived from the original on 5 November 2013.)	The Great North Museum	United Kingdom, Newcastle upon Tyne	Farrells	United Kingdom (London)
	2009	Commendation, Structural Design	Spans (e.g. bridges, stadiums, big sheds), Structural Design – Timber (Note: Commendation category Spans (eg bridges, stadiums, big sheds), Structural Design – Timber: "Richmond Olympic Oval Roof, Richmond, Canada". World Buildings Directory.)	Richmond Olympic Oval Roof	Canada, Richmond	Cannon Design	
	2009	Commendation, Structural Design	Civic and community, Interiors and Fit Out – Bars and restaurants, Structural Design -Spans (e.g. bridges, stadiums, big sheds) (Note: Commendation category Civic and community, Interiors and Fit Out – Bars and restaurants, Structural Design – Spans (eg bridges, stadiums, big sheds): "wNw Bar, Binh Duong, Vietnam". World Buildings Directory. Archived from the original on 5 November 2013.)	wNw Bar	Vietnam, Binh Duong	Vo Trong Nghia Co., Ltd.	Vietnam (Hochiminh City)
	2010	Award winner: World Building of the Year and winner of category culture	Culture (Note: Award winner category Culture: "MAXXI, National Museum of XXI Century Arts, Rome, Italy". World Buildings Directory. Archived from the original on 31 December 2011.)	MAXXI, National Museum of XXI Century Arts	Italy, Rome	Zaha Hadid Architects	United Kingdom (London)
	2010	Award winner: Future Project of the Year	Masterplanning, Future Projects (Note: Award winner category Masterplanning, Future Projects: "The Arc, Palestinian Territory, Occupied". World Buildings Directory. Archived from the original on 25 January 2012.)	The Arc	Palestine, Occupied	Suisman Urban Design	United States (Santa Monica)
	2010	Award winner: Interiors and Fit Out Overall Winner	Interiors and Fit Out – Offices (Note: Award winner category Interiors and Fit Out Overall Winner: "ANZ Centre, Melbourne, Australia". World Buildings Directory. Archived from the original on 1 November 2013.)	ANZ Centre	Australia, Melbourne	Hassell	
	2010	Award winner: Structural Design of the Year	Structural Design – Glass (where used structurally) (Note: Award winner category Structural Design – Glass (where used structurally) : "Medieval & Renaissance Galleries, London, United Kingdom". World Buildings Directory. Archived from the original on 29 October 2013.)	Medieval & Renaissance Galleries	United Kingdom, London	MUMA	United Kingdom (London)
	2010	Award winner: Student design competition	Student design competition: Campus Catalyst Project (Note: Award winner category Student design competition:Campus Catalyst Project: "AECOM Design + Planning Urban SOS, Port au Prince, Haiti". World Buildings Directory. Archived from the original on 28 December 2011.)	AECOM Design + Planning Urban SOS	Haiti, Port-au-Prince	Robin Bankert, Michael Murphy, Caroline Shannon and Joseph Wilfong, a graduate at MIT	United States, University of Harvard
	2010	Award winner: The Art and Work Award for Buildings Designed to Display Art	Structural Design – Glass (where used structurally) (Note: Award winner category Structural Design – Glass (where used structurally) : "Medieval & Renaissance Galleries, London, United Kingdom". World Buildings Directory. Archived from the original on 29 October 2013.) (Note: Pressrelease posted 05/11/10: "Art and Work Award for best building winner: Medieval and Renaissance Galleries of the Victoria and". World Buildings Directory. Archived from the original on 28 December 2011.)	Medieval & Renaissance Galleries	United Kingdom, London	MUMA	United Kingdom (London)
	2010	Award winner: ONCE Foundation Award for Accessibility (Two joint winners)	Sport (Note: Award winner category Sport : "Aviva Stadium, Dublin, Ireland". World Buildings Directory. Archived from the original on 4 May 2012.)	Aviva Stadium	Ireland, Dublin	POPULOUS in association with Scott Tallon Walker	
	2010	Award winner: ONCE Foundation Award for Accessibility (Two joint winners)	Civic and community, Health (Note: Award winner category Civic and community, Health : "West Vancouver Community Centre, West Vancouver, Canada". World Buildings Directory. Archived from the original on 29 October 2013.)	West Vancouver Community Centre	Canada, West Vancouver	Hughes Condon Marler Architects	Canada (Vancouver)
	2010	Category Winner, Completed Buildings	Civic and community (Note: Winner of category Civic and community : "City of Justice, Barcelona, Spain". World Buildings Directory. Archived from the original on 5 November 2013.)	City of Justice	Spain, Barcelona	David Chipperfield Architects and b720 Arquitectos	United Kingdom (London) & Spain
	2010	Category Winner, Completed Buildings	Display (Note: Winner of category Display : "Spanish Pavilion for Shanghai World Expo 2010, Shanghai, China". World Buildings Directory. Archived from the original on 5 November 2013.)	Spanish Pavilion for Shanghai World Expo 2010	China, Shanghai	Miralles Tagliabue (EMBT) & Benedetta Tagliabue	Spain (Barcelona)
	2010	Category Winner, Completed Buildings	Health (Note: Winner of category Health: "Brain and Mind Research Institute – Youth Mental Health Building, Camperdown, Australia". World Buildings Directory. Archived from the original on 5 November 2013.)	Brain and Mind Research Institute – Youth Mental Health Building	Australia, Camperdown	BVN Architecture	Australia (Sydney)
	2010	Category Winner, Completed Buildings	Holiday (Note: Winner of category Holiday : "Alila Villas Uluwatu, Bali Indonesia". World Buildings Directory. Archived from the original on 5 November 2013.)	Alila Villas Uluwatu, Bali Indonesia	Indonesia, Bali	WOHA	Singapore (Singapore)
	2010	Category Winner, Completed Buildings	House (Note: Winner of category House : "A Forest for a Moon Dazzler, Playa Avellanas, Costa Rica". World Buildings Directory. Archived from the original on 5 November 2013.)	A Forest for a Moon Dazzler	Costa Rica, Playa Avellanas	Benjamin Garcia Saxe Architect	United Kingdom (London)
	2010	Category Winner, Completed Buildings	Housing (inc mixed use) (Note: Winner of category Housing (inc mixed use): "Pinnacle @ Duxton, Singapore, Republic of". World Buildings Directory. Archived from the original on 4 August 2013.)	Pinnacle @ Duxton	Singapore	ARC Studio Architecture + Urbanism	Singapore (Singapore)
	2010	Category Winner, Completed Buildings	Landscape	Shanghai Houtan Park (Note: Winner of category Landscape: "Shanghai Houtan Park, Shanghai, China". World Buildings Directory. Archived from the original on 5 November 2013.)	China, Shanghai	Turenscape	China (Beijing)
	2010	Category Winner, Completed Buildings	Learning (Note: Winner of category Learning: "School of the Arts, Singapore, Singapore, Singapore, Republic of". World Buildings Directory. Archived from the original on 19 April 2013.)	School of the Arts, Singapore	Singapore, Singapore	WOHA	Singapore (Singapore)
	2010	Category Winner, Completed Buildings	New and old (Note: Winner of category New and old: "DDB Office, Istanbul, Turkey". World Buildings Directory. Archived from the original on 19 April 2013.)	DDB Office	Turkey, Istanbul	Erginoglu&Calislar	
	2010	Category Winner, Completed Buildings	Office (inc mixed use) (Note: Winner of category Office (inc mixed use) : "Vali-Asr Commercial-Office Building, Tehran, Iran". World Buildings Directory. Archived from the original on 5 November 2013.)	Vali-Asr Commercial-Office Building	Iran, Tehran	RYRA Studio	Iran (Tehran)
	2010	Category Winner, Completed Buildings	Production, energy and recycling (Note: Winner of category Production, energy and recycling : "Yevlakh Seed Industry Campus, Yevlakh, Azerbaijan". World Buildings Directory. Archived from the original on 19 April 2013.)	Yevlakh Seed Industry Campus	Azerbaijan, Yevlakh	TOCA	Turkey (Istanbul)
	2010	Category Winner, Completed Buildings	Shopping (inc mixed use) (Note: Winner of category Shopping (inc mixed use): "YAMAHA GINZA, Ginza, Chuo-ku, Japan". World Buildings Directory. Archived from the original on 19 April 2013.)	YAMAHA GINZA	Japan, Ginza, Chuo-ku	Nikken Sekkei Ltd	
	2010	Category Winner, Completed Buildings	Sport (Note: Winner of category Sport: "Soccer City, National Stadium – 'The Melting Pot', Johannesburg, South Africa". World Buildings Directory. Archived from the original on 24 December 2011.)	Soccer City, National Stadium – 'The Melting Pot'	South Africa, Johannesburg	Boogertman + Partners (in association with Populous)	South Africa (& United Kingdom)
	2010	Category Winner, Completed Buildings	Transport (Note: Winner of category Transport: "The Helix Bridge, Singapore, Republic of". World Buildings Directory. Archived from the original on 5 November 2013.)	The Helix Bridge	Singapore	Cox Rayner Architects & Architects 61	Australia (Brisbane) & Singapore
	2010	Category Winner, Future Projects	Commercial, Future Projects (Note: Winner of category Commercial, Future Projects: "OFFICES' 63, Gurgaon, India". World Buildings Directory. Archived from the original on 15 August 2011.)	OFFICES' 63	India, Gurgaon	Sanjay Puri Architects Pvt. Ltd.	India (Mumbai)
	2010	Category Winner, Future Projects	Competition entries, Future Projects (Note: Winner of category Competition entries, Future Projects: "Dance and Music Centre, Netherlands". World Buildings Directory. Archived from the original on 25 September 2011.)	Dance and Music Centre	Netherlands	Aedas	Hong Kong (Quarry Bay)
	2010	Category Winner, Future Projects	Cultural, Future Projects (Note: Winner of category Cultural, Future Projects: "CONCERT HALL JORDANEK IN TORUN, Torun, Poland". World Buildings Directory. Archived from the original on 7 May 2013.)	CONCERT HALL JORDANEK IN TORUN	Poland, Torun	Menis Arquitectos	
	2010	Category Winner, Future Projects	Education, Future Projects (Note: Winner of category Education, Future Projects: "Sabah Al-Salem University – Kuwait University City, College of Education, Kuwait City, Kuwait". World Buildings Directory. Archived from the original on 15 August 2011.)	Sabah Al-Salem University – Kuwait University City, College of Education	Kuwait, Kuwait City	Perkins+Will & Dar Al Handasah	United States (New York) & Lebanon
	2010	Category Winner, Future Projects	Experimental Projects, Future Projects (Note: Winner of category Experimental Projects, Future Projects: "No project awarded as overall winner". World Buildings Directory. Archived from the original on 30 July 2013.)	No project awarded as overall winner			
	2010	Category Winner, Future Projects	Health, Future Projects (Note: Winner of category Health, Future Projects: "Kuwait Children's Hospital, Kuwait City, Kuwait". World Buildings Directory. Archived from the original on 5 November 2013.)	Kuwait Children's Hospital	Kuwait, Kuwait City	AGi Architects SL	Spain (Madrid)
	2010	Category Winner, Future Projects	Infrastructure, Future Projects (Note: Winner of category Infrastructure, Future Projects: "West Kowloon Terminus, Hong Kong". World Buildings Directory. Archived from the original on 5 November 2013.)	West Kowloon Terminus	Hong Kong	Aedas	Hong Kong (Quarry Bay)
	2010	Category Winner, Future Projects	Landscape, Future Projects (Note: Winner of category Landscape, Future Projects: "No project awarded as overall winner". World Buildings Directory. Archived from the original on 30 July 2013.)	No project awarded as overall winner			
	2010	Category Winner, Future Projects	Residential, Future Projects (Note: Winner of category Residential, Future Projects: "No project awarded as overall winner". World Buildings Directory. Archived from the original on 30 July 2013.)	No project awarded as overall winner			
	2010	Commendation, Completed Buildings	Display (Note: Commendation category Display : "Danish Pavilion – Shanghai World Expo 2010, Shanghai, China". World Buildings Directory. Archived from the original on 5 November 2013.)	Danish Pavilion – Shanghai World Expo 2010	China, Shanghai	BIG	
	2010	Commendation, Completed Buildings	House (Note: Commendation category House: "Townhouse, Landskrona, Sweden". World Buildings Directory. Archived from the original on 5 November 2013.)	Townhouse, Landskrona	Sweden, Landskrona	Elding Oscarson	Sweden (Stockholm)
	2010	Commendation, Completed Buildings	Housing (inc mixed use) (Note: Commendation category Housing (inc mixed use): "Barking Central, Barking, United Kingdom". World Buildings Directory. Archived from the original on 26 March 2011.)	Barking Central	United Kingdom, Barking	Allford Hall Monaghan Morris	
	2010	Commendation, Completed Buildings	Office (inc mixed use) (Note: Commendation category Office (inc mixed use): "Middelfart Savings Bank, Middelfart, Denmark". World Buildings Directory. Archived from the original on 5 November 2013.)	Middelfart Savings Bank	Denmark, Middelfart	3XN	Denmark (Copenhagen)
	2010	Commendation, Completed Buildings	Sport (Note: Commendation category Sport: "Aviva Stadium, Dublin, Ireland". World Buildings Directory. Archived from the original on 4 May 2012.)	Aviva Stadium	Ireland, Dublin	POPULOUS in association with Scott Tallon Walker	
	2010	Commendation, Future projects	Cultural, Future Projects (Note: Commendation category Cultural, Future Projects: "CONCERT HALL JORDANEK IN TORUN, Torun, Poland". World Buildings Directory. Archived from the original on 7 May 2013.)	CONCERT HALL JORDANEK IN TORUN	Poland, Torun	Menis Arquitectos	
	2010	Commendation, Interiors and Fit Out	Culture and civic, Interiors and Fit Out (Note: Commendation category Culture and civic: "The Academy, Docklands, Australia". World Buildings Directory. Archived from the original on 5 November 2013.)	The Academy	Australia, Docklands	BVN Architecture	
	2010	Commendation, Interiors and Fit Out	Offices, Interiors and Fit Out (Note: Commendation category Culture and civic: "One Shelley Street – Macquarie Group, Sydney, Australia". World Buildings Directory. Archived from the original on 5 November 2013.)	One Shelley Street – Macquarie Group	Australia, Sydney	Clive Wilkinson Architects & Woods Bagot	United States & Australia
	2010	Commendation, Structural Design	Structural Design (Note: Commendation category Structural Design: "No project highly commended". World Buildings Directory. Archived from the original on 30 July 2013.)	No project highly commended			
	2011	Award winner: World Building of the Year	Office (inc mixed use) (Note: Award winner: World Building of the Year and winner of category Office (inc mixed use): "Media-ICT, Barcelona, Spain". World Buildings Directory. Archived from the original on 9 February 2014.)	Media-ICT	Spain, Barcelona	Cloud 9	Spain (Barcelona)
	2011	Award winner: Future Project of the Year	Infrastructure, Future Projects (Note: Award winner category Infrastructure, Future Projects: "Hanimaadhoo International Airport, Maldives". World Buildings Directory. Archived from the original on 22 March 2013.)	Hanimaadhoo International Airport	Maldives	Integrated Design Associates Limited	Hong Kong (Hong Kong)
8 Spruce Street (New York by Gehry)	2011	Award winner: Structural Design of the Year	Structural Design – Towers (Note: Award winner category Structural Design – Towers: "Eight Spruce Street, United States of America". World Buildings Directory. Archived from the original on 21 December 2014.)	Eight Spruce Street	United States, New York	Gehry Partners, LLP	
	2011	Award winner: ONCE Foundation Award for Accessibility	Culture (Note: Award winner category Culture: "Museum of Memory and Tolerance, Mexico City, Mexico, Mexico". World Buildings Directory. Archived from the original on 11 October 2012.)	Museum of Memory and Tolerance	Mexico, Mexico City	Arditti+RDT/arquitectos	Mexico (Mexico)
	2011	Award winner: People's Choice Award, by OpenBuildings	Culture (Note: Award winner: People's Choice Award, by OpenBuildings and category Culture: "Memorial house Todor Proeski, Krushevo, Macedonia". World Buildings Directory. Archived from the original on 11 October 2012.)	Memorial house Todor Proeski	North Macedonia, Krushevo	Syndicate studio	North Macedonia (Skopje)
	2011	Category Winner, Completed Buildings	Civic and community (Note: Winner of category Civic and community: "Saint Nicholas Antiochian Orthodox Christian Church, Springdale, United States of America". World Buildings Directory. Archived from the original on 5 November 2013.)	Saint Nicholas Antiochian Orthodox Christian Church	United States, Springdale	Marlon Blackwell Architect	United States (Fayetteville)
	2011	Category Winner, Completed Buildings	Culture, New and old (Note: Winner of category Culture, New and old: "SHIMA KITCHEN, Tonosyotyo, Japan". World Buildings Directory. Archived from the original on 11 October 2012.)	SHIMA KITCHEN	Japan, Tonosyotyo	Architects Atelier Ryo Abe	Japan (Tokyo)
	2011	Category Winner, Completed Buildings	Display (Note: Winner of category Display: "Norwegian Wild Reindeer Center Pavilion, Hjerkinn, Norway". World Buildings Directory. Archived from the original on 20 October 2013.)	Norwegian Wild Reindeer Center Pavilion	Norway, Hjerkinn	Snøhetta	
	2011	Category Winner, Completed Buildings	Health, Landscape (Note: Winner of category Health, Landscape: "rehabilitation centre Groot Klimmendaal, Arnhem, Netherlands". World Buildings Directory. Archived from the original on 5 November 2013.)	rehabilitation centre Groot Klimmendaal	Netherlands, Arnhem	Architectenbureau K van Velsen BV	Netherlands (Hilversum)
	2011	Category Winner, Completed Buildings	Holiday (Note: Winner of category Holiday: "Raas Jodhpur, Jodhpur, India". World Buildings Directory. Archived from the original on 26 November 2013.)	Raas Jodhpur	India, Jodhpur	The Lotus Praxis Initiative, Lotus Design Services & Praxis Inc	India
	2011	Category Winner, Completed Buildings	House (Note: Winner of category House: "Small House, Sydney, Australia". World Buildings Directory. Archived from the original on 5 November 2013.)	Small House	Australia, Sydney	Domenic Alvaro	Australia (Sydney)
	2011	Category Winner, Completed Buildings	Housing (inc mixed use) (Note: Winner of category Housing (inc mixed use): "8 House, Copenhagen, Denmark". World Buildings Directory. Archived from the original on 19 January 2015.)	8 House	Denmark, Copenhagen	Bjarke Ingels Group	Denmark
	2011	Category Winner, Completed Buildings	Landscape (Note: Winner of category Landscape: "A Mother River Recovered—The Sanlihe Greenway, China". World Buildings Directory. Archived from the original on 5 November 2013.)	A Mother River Recovered—The Sanlihe Greenway	China	Turenscape	China (Beijing)
	2011	Category Winner, Completed Buildings	Learning (Note: Winner of category Learning: "Sainsbury Laboratory, Cambridge, United Kingdom". World Buildings Directory. Archived from the original on 10 October 2014.)	Sainsbury Laboratory	United Kingdom, Cambridge	Stanton Williams	United Kingdom (London)
	2011	Category Winner, Completed Buildings	New and old (Note: Winner of category New and old: "PUZZLE PIECE, TM. de Telde, Spain". World Buildings Directory. Archived from the original on 6 August 2014.)	PUZZLE PIECE	Spain, TM. de Telde	Romera y Ruiz Arquitectos	Spain (Las Palmas de GC)
	2011	Category Winner, Completed Buildings	Office (inc mixed use) (Note: Winner of category Office (inc mixed use) : "Media-ICT, Barcelona, Spain". World Buildings Directory. Archived from the original on 9 February 2014.)	Media-ICT	Spain, Barcelona	Cloud 9	Spain (Barcelona)
	2011	Category Winner, Completed Buildings	Production, energy and recycling (Note: Winner of category Production, energy and recycling: "WASTE TREATMENT FACILITY FROM VALLÈS OCCIDENTAL IN VACARISSES (BARCELONA), Vacarisses, Spain". World Buildings Directory. Archived from the original on 11 October 2012.)	WASTE TREATMENT FACILITY FROM VALLÈS OCCIDENTAL IN VACARISSES (BARCELONA)	Spain, Vacarisses	Batlle & Roig Architects	Spain (Esplugues de LLobregat)
	2011	Category Winner, Completed Buildings	Shopping (inc mixed use) (Note: Winner of category Shopping (inc mixed use): "Decameron, São Paulo, Brazil". World Buildings Directory. Archived from the original on 1 November 2013.)	Decameron	Brazil, São Paulo	Studio MK27	Brazil (São Paulo)
	2011	Category Winner, Completed Buildings	Sport (Note: Winner of category Sport: "SPEEDSKATING STADIUM INZELL – MAX AICHER ARENA, Inzell, Germany". World Buildings Directory. Archived from the original on 11 October 2012.)	SPEEDSKATING STADIUM INZELL – MAX AICHER ARENA	Germany, Inzell	BEHNISCH Architekten	Germany (Munich)
	2011	Category Winner, Completed Buildings	Transport (Note: Winner of category Transport: "Kurilpa Bridge, Brisbane, Australia". World Buildings Directory. Archived from the original on 5 November 2013.)	Kurilpa Bridge	Australia, Brisbane	Cox Rayner Architects	Australia (Brisbane)
	2011	Category Winner, Completed Buildings	House (Note: Winner of category House: "InBetween House, Karuizawa, Japan". World Buildings Directory. Archived from the original on 5 November 2013.)	InBetween House	Japan, Karuizawa	Koji Tsutsui & Associates	Japan (Tokyo)
	2011	Category Winner, Future Projects	Commercial, Future Projects & Experimental projects, Future Projects (Note: Winner of category Commercial, Future Projects & Experimental projects, Future Projects: "Wadi Rum Resort, Jordan". World Buildings Directory. Archived from the original on 11 June 2014.)	Wadi Rum Resort	Jordan	Oppenheim Architecture + Design	United States (Miami)
	2011	Category Winner, Future Projects	Competition entries, Future Projects & Cultural, Future Projects (Note: Winner of category Competition entries, Future Projects & Cultural, Future Projects: "Glacier Discovery Walk, Jasper National Park, Canada". World Buildings Directory. Archived from the original on 5 November 2013.)	Glacier Discovery Walk	Canada, Jasper National Park	Sturgess Architecture	Canada (Calgary)
	2011	Category Winner, Future Projects	Cultural, Future Projects (Note: Winner of category Cultural, Future Projects: "Zhang Da Qian Museum, Neijiang, China". World Buildings Directory. Archived from the original on 19 March 2012.)	Zhang Da Qian Museum	China, Neijiang	Miralles Tagliabue EMBT	Spain (Barcelona)
	2011	Category Winner, Future Projects	Education, Future Projects, Masterplanning, Future Projects (Note: Winner of category Education, Future Projects: "Women's Opportunity Center, Kayonza, Rwanda". World Buildings Directory. Archived from the original on 19 March 2012.)	Women's Opportunity Center	Rwanda, Kayonza	Sharon Davis Design	
	2011	Category Winner, Future Projects	Experimental projects, Future Projects (Note: Winner of category Experimental projects, Future Projects: "The Tower of Nests, Shanghai, China". World Buildings Directory. Archived from the original on 11 October 2012.)	The Tower of Nests	China, Shanghai	Kjellgren Kaminsky Architecture AB	Sweden (Göteborg)
	2011	Category Winner, Future Projects	Health, Future Projects (Note: Winner of category Health, Future Projects: "Binh Chanh Pediatric Hospital, Ho Chi Minh City, Vietnam". World Buildings Directory. Archived from the original on 5 November 2013.)	Binh Chanh Pediatric Hospital	Vietnam, Ho Chi Minh City	VK, 2050 A+P & Nhat My	Belgium (Roeselare), Vietnam & Vietnam
	2011	Category Winner, Future Projects	Landscape, Future Projects (Note: Winner of category Landscape, Future Projects: "Shoreline Walk, Beirut, Lebanon". World Buildings Directory. Archived from the original on 5 November 2013.)	Shoreline Walk	Lebanon, Beirut	Gustafson Porter	
	2011	Category Winner, Future Projects	Masterplanning, Future Projects (Note: Winner of category Masterplanning, Future Projects: "West Kowloon Cultural District Conceptual Plan, Hong Kong". World Buildings Directory. Archived from the original on 16 October 2014.)	West Kowloon Cultural District Conceptual Plan	Hong Kong	Rocco Design Architects Ltd	Hong Kong (Hong Kong)
	2011	Category Winner, Future Projects	Residential, Future Projects (Note: Winner of category Residential, Future Projects: "Wafra Living, Kuwait". World Buildings Directory. Archived from the original on 5 November 2013.)	Wafra Living	Kuwait	AGi Architects	Spain
	2012	Award winner: World Building of the Year	Display (Note: Award winner: World Building of the Year and winner of category Display: "Cooled Conservatories at Gardens by the Bay, Singapore, Republic of". World Buildings Directory. Archived from the original on 4 April 2014.)	Cooled Conservatories at Gardens by the Bay	Singapore	Wilkinson Eyre Architects	United Kingdom (London)
	2012	Award winner: Future Project of the Year, Landscape	Landscape (Projects), urban (Completed designs) (Note: Award winner: Landscape Project of the Year and winner of category Landscape Projects – Completed designs -urban: "Kallang River Bishan Park, Singapore, Republic of". World Buildings Directory. Archived from the original on 16 October 2014.)	Kallang River Bishan Park	Singapore	Atelier Dreiseitl	
	2012	Award winner: Future Project of the Year	Masterplanning (Note: Award winner: Future Project of the Year and winner of category Masterplanning: "Msheireb -Heart of Doha, Doha, Qatar". World Buildings Directory. Archived from the original on 8 August 2014.)	Msheireb – Heart of Doha	Qatar, Doha	AECOM, London (UK), Adjaye Associates (UK), Allies and Morrison (UK), Eric Party Architects (UK), Gensler (United States), HOK (United States), John McAslan and Partners (UK), Mangera Yvars Architects (UK), Mossessian & Partners (UK), Squire and Partners (UK)	United Kingdom & United States
2012 Student winner: In the core of rainassance architecture	2012	Award winner: Student Team of the Year	Student Team of the Year from University of Ferrara in Italy (Note: Award winner category Student Team of the Year: "In the Core of Renaissance Architecture, University of Ferrara, Italy". World Buildings Directory. Archived from the original on 13 December 2013.)	In the Core of Renaissance Architecture	Italy, Ferrara	Daniele Pronestì, Daniele Petralia, Stefano Nastasi	Italy (Ferrara)
	2012	Award winner: Director's Prize	New and Old (Note: Award winner category New and Old: "Plaza España in Adeje, Tenerife, Spain". World Buildings Directory. Archived from the original on 3 December 2014.)	Plaza España in Adeje	Spain, Tenerife	Menis Arquitectos SLP	Spain (Santa Cruz de Tenerife)
	2012	Award winner: Small Project Award	Transport (Note: Award winner category Transport: "Marina Bay Station, Singapore, Republic of". World Buildings Directory. Archived from the original on 20 October 2012.)	Marina Bay Station	Singapore	Aedas, Quarry Bay & Aedas Pte Ltd (Station Architect)	Hong Kong & Singapore
	2012	Award winner: Small Project Award	Office (Note: Award winner category Office: "Office for an Advertising Film Production Company, Bangalore, India". World Buildings Directory. Archived from the original on 20 October 2012.)	Office for an Advertising Film Production Company	India, Bangalore	SJK Architects	India, Mumbai
	2012	Category Winner, Completed Buildings	Civic and community (Note: Winner of category Civic and community: "SALORGE / TOWN COMMUNITY, France". World Buildings Directory. Archived from the original on 3 December 2014.)	SALORGE / TOWN COMMUNITY	France, Pornic	Atelier Arcau	France (Vannes)
	2012	Category Winner, Completed Buildings	Culture (Note: Winner of category Culture: "Liyuan Library, Beijing, China". World Buildings Directory. Archived from the original on 8 August 2014.)	Liyuan Library	China, Beijing	Li Xiaodong Atelier	China (Beijing)
	2012	Category Winner, Completed Buildings	Health (Note: Winner of category Health: "The Royal Children's Hospital, Melbourne, Australia". World Buildings Directory. Archived from the original on 3 December 2014.)	The Royal Children's Hospital	Australia, Melbourne	Billiard Leece Partnership and Bates Smart	
	2012	Category Winner, Completed Buildings	Higher education/research (Note: Winner of category Higher education/research: "University of the Arts London Campus for Central Saint Martins at King's Cross, London, United Kingdom". World Buildings Directory. Archived from the original on 8 August 2014.)	University of the Arts London Campus for Central Saint Martins at King's Cross	United Kingdom, London	Stanton Williams	United Kingdom (London)
	2012	Category Winner, Completed Buildings	Hotel/leisure (Note: Winner of category Hotel/leisure: "Victoria Tower, Kista, Sweden". World Buildings Directory. Archived from the original on 30 July 2014.)	Victoria Tower	Sweden, Kista	Wingårdh Arkitektkontor AB N/A	Sweden
	2012	Category Winner, Completed Buildings	House (Note: Winner of category House: "Stacking Green, Ho Chi Minh City, Vietnam". World Buildings Directory. Archived from the original on 3 December 2014.)	Stacking Green	Vietnam, Ho Chi Minh City	Vo Trong Nghia Architects	Vietnam (Ho Chi Minh City)
	2012	Category Winner, Completed Buildings	Housing (Note: Winner of category Housing: "I hope that Singapore doesn't have a style" – Kerry Hill on Martin No. 38". Dezeen Magazine. 2 November 2012.)	Martin No 38	Singapore, Singapore	Kerry Hill Architects Pte Ltd	Singapore (Singapore)
	2012	Category Winner, Completed Buildings	New and Old (Note: Winner of category New and Old: "Plaza España in Adeje, Tenerife, Spain". World Buildings Directory. Archived from the original on 3 December 2014.)	Plaza España in Adeje	Spain, Tenerife	Menis Arquitectos SLP	Spain (Santa Cruz de Tenerife)
	2012	Category Winner, Completed Buildings	Office (Note: Winner of category Office: "Darling Quarter, Australia". World Buildings Directory. Archived from the original on 3 December 2014.)	Darling Quarter	Australia, Sydney	Francis-Jones Morehen Thorp	Australia (Sydney)
	2012	Category Winner, Completed Buildings	Production/energy/recycling (Note: Winner of category Production/energy/recycling: "Sony Corporation Sony City Osaki, Tokyo, Japan". World Buildings Directory. Archived from the original on 30 July 2014.)	Sony Corporation Sony City Osaki	Japan, Tokyo	Nikken Sekkei	Japan
	2012	Category Winner, Completed Buildings	Schools (Note: Winner of category Schools: "Binh Duong School, Binh Duong, Vietnam". World Buildings Directory. Archived from the original on 5 September 2014.)	Binh Duong School	Vietnam, Binh Duong	Vo Trong Nghia Architects	Vietnam (Ho Chi Minh City)
	2012	Category Winner, Completed Buildings	Shopping (Note: Winner of category Shopping: "Xtra-Herman Miller shop in shop, Singapore, Singapore, Republic of". World Buildings Directory. Archived from the original on 30 July 2014.)	Xtra-Herman Miller shop in shop	Singapore, Singapore	P.A.C	Singapore (Singapore)
	2012	Category Winner, Completed Buildings	Shopping (Note: Winner of category Shopping: "T-Site, Japan". World Buildings Directory. Archived from the original on 30 July 2014.)	T-Site	Japan	Klein Dytham Architects	Japan (Shibuya-ku)
	2012	Category Winner, Completed Buildings	Sport (Note: Winner of category Sport: "FAZENDA BOA VISTA GOLF CLUBHOUSE, Brazil". World Buildings Directory. Archived from the original on 8 August 2014.)	FAZENDA BOA VISTA | GOLF CLUBHOUSE	Brazil	Isay Weinfeld	Brazil (São Paulo)
	2012	Category Winner, Completed Buildings	Transport (Note: Winner of category Transport: "Bodrum International Airport, Turkey". World Buildings Directory. Archived from the original on 3 December 2014.)	Bodrum International Airport	Turkey	tabanlioglu architects	Turkey (Istanbul)
	2012	Category Winner, Completed Buildings	Villa (Note: Winner of category Villa: "Shearer's Quarters, North Bruny Island, Australia". World Buildings Directory. Archived from the original on 3 December 2014.)	Shearer's Quarters	Australia, North Bruny Island	John Wardle Architects	Australia (Collingwood)
	2012	Category Winner, Future Projects	Competition entries, Future Projects (Note: Winner of category Competition entries, Future Projects: "Perry Park, Alexandria, Australia". World Buildings Directory. Archived from the original on 8 August 2014.)	Perry Park	Australia, Alexandria	Hassell	
	2012	Category Winner, Future Projects	Culture, Future Projects (Note: Winner of category Culture, Future Projects: "Beijing Artist Village Gallery Project, China". World Buildings Directory. Archived from the original on 8 August 2014.)	Beijing Artist Village Gallery Project	China	Aedas, Aedas Beijing Limited	Hong Kong (Quarry Bay) & China
	2012	Category Winner, Future Projects	Education, Future Projects, Masterplanning, Future Projects (Note: Winner of category Education, Future Projects, Masterplanning, Future Projects: "AGU City Campus, Kayseri, Turkey". World Buildings Directory. Archived from the original on 30 July 2014.)	AGU City Campus	Turkey, Kayseri	EAA-Emre Arolat Architects	Turkey (1. Levent)
	2012	Category Winner, Future Projects	Experimental, Future Projects (Note: Winner of category Experimental, Future Projects: "Man-Built Islands Dongqian Lake Concept Design, Ningbo, China". World Buildings Directory. Archived from the original on 30 July 2014.)	Man-Built Islands Dongqian Lake Concept Design	China, Ningbo	Hassell	
	2012	Category Winner, Future Projects	Health, Future Projects (Note: Winner of category Health, Future Projects: "Rigshospitalet – The North Wing, Copenhagen, Denmark". World Buildings Directory. Archived from the original on 3 December 2014.)	Rigshospitalet – The North Wing	Denmark, Copenhagen	3XN, Aarhus Arkitekterne & Nickl & Partner Architechten	Denmark (Copenhagen), Denmark & Germany
	2012	Category Winner, Future Projects	House, Future Projects (Note: Winner of category House, Future Projects: "C3 House, Wanaka, New Zealand". World Buildings Directory. Archived from the original on 3 December 2014.)	C3 House	New Zealand, Wānaka	RTA Studio	New Zealand (Auckland)
	2012	Category Winner, Future Projects	Infrastructure, Future Projects (Note: Winner of category Infrastructure, Future Projects: "Tianjin Binhai Transport Interchange – Public Domain, Tianjin Binhai New District, China". World Buildings Directory. Archived from the original on 3 December 2014.)	Tianjin Binhai Transport Interchange – Public Domain	China, Tianjin Binhai New District	Hassell	
	2012	Category Winner, Future Projects	Leisure led development, Future Projects (Note: Winner of category Leisure led development, Future Projects: "Gunoot Eco Resort, Oman, Oman". World Buildings Directory. Archived from the original on 30 July 2014.)	Gunoot Eco Resort	Oman, Oman	Dar SSH International Engineering Consultants, California Institute of Earth Architecture & SSH International	Kuwait (Kuwait), United States, & Kuwait
	2012	Category Winner, Future Projects	Mixed use, Future Projects (Note: Winner of category Mixed use, Future Projects: "JST Product Complex, Tsuyama, Japan". World Buildings Directory. Archived from the original on 30 July 2014.)	JST Product Complex	Japan, Tsuyama	Osamu Morishita Architect & Associates	Japan (Osaka-shi)
	2012	Category Winner, Future Projects	Office, Future Projects (Note: Winner of category Office, Future Projects: "120 Fenchurch Street, London, United Kingdom". World Buildings Directory. Archived from the original on 3 December 2014.)	120 Fenchurch Street	United Kingdom, London	Eric Parry Architects	United Kingdom (London)
	2012	Category Winner, Future Projects	Residential, Future Projects (Note: Winner of category Residential, Future Projects: "TERASA 153, MONTENEGRO, Serbia and Montenegro". World Buildings Directory. Archived from the original on 3 December 2014.)	TERASA 153, MONTENEGRO	Serbia and Montenegro	Sanjay Puri Architects Pvt. Ltd.	India (Mumbai)
	2013	Award winner: World Building of the Year, not yet awarded	category (Note: Award winner category category: "project name, city, country" (Document). World Buildings Directory.)	name	country, city	architect	country (city)
	2013	Category Winner, Completed Buildings, not yet awarded	category (Note: Winner of category category: "xnavn, xby, xland" (Document). World Buildings Directory.)	name	country, city	architect	country (city)
	2013	Category Winner, Future Projects, not yet awarded	category (Note: Winner of category category, Future Projects: "xnavn, xby, xland" (Document). World Buildings Directory.)	name	country, city	architect	country (city)
	2023	Category Winner, Completed Buildings	Hotels & Leisure	Lanserhof Sylt	Germany, Sylt	ingenhoven associates	Germany, Inzell
	2023	Category Winner, World Building of the Year		Huizhen High School	China, Ningbo, Zhejiang province	Approach Design Studio/Zhejiang University of Technology Engineering Design Group	China
	2023	Category Winner, Future Project of the Year		The Probiotic Tower	Egypt, Cairo	Design and More International	Egypt
	2023	Overall Winner	Interior of the Year	19 Waterloo Street	Sydney, Australia	SJB	Australia
	2024	Student Charette	Special Prizes	Staging Symbiosis - Rathlin Island Test Kitchen	Rathlin Island, Northern Ireland	Queen's University Belfast (Team - Oileán Galligan, Hannah Jackson, Oliver Petch, Jake Newman, Phil Kennedy)	Ireland
	2024	Award winner: World Building of the Year	World Building of the Year	Darlington Public School	Sydney, Australia	Francis-Jones Morehen Thorp	Australia
	2024	Category Winner, Future Project of the Year	Future Project of the Year	Küçükçekmece Djemevi	Istanbul, Turkey	EAA-Emre Arolat Architecture	Turkey
