= John Dewar (academic) =

Australian legal scholar, consultant, university administrator

John Dewar AO
- Born: 11 September 1959 (age 67); Kingston, Jamaica
- Citizenship: Australian

John Kinley Dewar AO (born 9 September 1959) is an Australian academic and consultant. He served as the vice-chancellor of La Trobe University from 2012 to 2024 and was from June 2024 until 2025 the interim vice-chancellor of the University of Wollongong. and was a partner with KordaMentha.

== Education ==
He was educated at Griffith University (Phd) and Abingdon School and Hertford College, Oxford,

== Career ==
Dewar is an internationally known family law specialist. He was a member of the Commonwealth Attorney-General's Family Law Pathways Advisory Group from 2000 to 2001 and a former member and chair of the Family Law Council from 1998 to 2004.

Before working at Griffith University, Dewar taught at the universities of Lancaster and Warwick in the United Kingdom and was a fellow and tutor in law at Hertford College, Oxford. He was Head of Education and Training for Allen & Overy (London) from 1988 to 1990.

=== Griffith University ===
Dewar moved from the United Kingdom in 1995 to take up a professorial position in the Griffith University Law School, where he eventually became the dean of the school from 1999 to 2002. From 2002 to 2005, he was the pro vice-chancellor for business and law and then became deputy vice-chancellor (academic).

=== University of Melbourne ===
Dewar followed Vice-Chancellor Glyn Davis after his move to the University of Melbourne , becoming the deputy vice-chancellor (global relations). In September that year, he was appointed provost of the university, a role similar to his previous one at Griffith University. The role's focus was "on refining the Melbourne Model and ensuring successful second phase implementation of the University's graduate programs in 2011".

=== La Trobe University ===
Dewar became the sixth vice-chancellor of La Trobe University in Melbourne, Australia, in January 2012. On arrival, he declared that his goal was to ensure that La Trobe be "recognised as the natural alternative to Victoria's two Group of Eight universities, with a unique appeal other universities can't offer".

In 2012, Dewar announced a plan to cut 500 subjects and 41 jobs. Dewar fled from student protestors and escaped via a network of tunnels under the university, they being frustrated with his plan to cut university subjects and jobs. In 2014, Dewar announced that 350 staff would be sacked without any voluntary redundancies.

In 2020 as a consequence of the effects of COVID-19 on university revenue, Dewar was one of four vice-chancellors who negotiated with the National Tertiary Education Union's leadership to deliver the Australian Universities Job Protection Framework. La Trobe staff subsequently voted to vary the university's collective agreement pursuant to the Job Protection Framework, opting to take pay cuts to protect the financial equivalent of around 225 jobs.

Humanities and the arts became the subject of reductions in November 2020, with Dewar informing staff that some subjects were no longer financially viable.

In 2021, Dewar consulted on a proposal to close the school of molecular science and reassign its disciplines to other schools in a bid to reduce costs.

In February 2023, La Trobe chancellor the Hon John Brumby announced that, after 12 years, Dewar would conclude his term as vice-chancellor in early 2024.. Dewar is an emeritus professor at La Trobe University.

=== Korda Mentha ===
Dewar was a partner of KordaMentha’s Performance Improvement team working with higher education, corporate, and government clients. This ended following the release of the NSW Parliament report in universities and the private and confidential release of ICAC’s draft findings.

=== University of Wollongong ===
Dewar took up the role of interim vice-chancellor of the University of Wollongong from June 2024.

On 5 September 2024 the Illawarra Mercury raised questions about conflict of interest arising from Dewar’s position as a partner at the consulting firm KordaMentha, which has been awarded contracts to review aspects of how the University of Wollongong operates.

This broad issue is also currently under review by the state ICAC (Independent Commission Against Corruption) and NSW State Parliament.

The Independent Commission Against Corruption (New South Wales)(ICAC) examined Dewar in a public hearing in July 2026. Transcripts can be accessed on the ICAC homepage.

Julie Hare, publisher of the Hare Report and formerly higher education editor at a number of Australian publications, commented on the issues impacting Dewar’s time at the University and subsequent impact.

The NSW Parliament is currently reviewing if John Dewar committed contempt of Parliament following a sweeping NSW Legislative Council committee report.The finding, released by the Standing Committee on Social Issues, concludes that he gave "misleading" evidence under oath regarding his financial ties to the consulting firm KordaMentha.

The Core of the Contempt Finding Misleading Evidence: Dewar initially told the parliamentary inquiry that he had taken unpaid leave from KordaMentha when he took the top job at UOW. However, he later disclosed that he had actually received a payment and retained profit distribution entitlements from the firm.

The Conflict of Interest: While serving as UOW's interim vice-chancellor, KordaMentha secured operational restructuring contracts from the university worth $3.8 million.

ICAC Admissions: In mid-2026, during hearings for the NSW Independent Commission Against Corruption (ICAC) Operation Scandi, Dewar admitted that he wanted his UOW appointment to benefit KordaMentha and acknowledged that he had breached his duties by giving his firm an inside track during the tender process.

The parliamentary committee described the discrepancies between his inquiry testimony and his ICAC admissions as "highly significant" and a serious contravention of his sworn oath to speak truthfully.

=== Universities Australia ===
In April 2021, Dewar was elected chair of Universities Australia. In July 2022, he delivered a speech at the National Press Club arguing the case for investing in universities.

=== Other appointments ===
He was a director of the State Library of Victoria, director of Online Education Services (OES), Board Director of the Australian Industry Group Centre for Education and Training (CET), and a Council Member of Griffith University. These appointments ended suddenly and shortly after the ICAC corruption inquiry in July 2026.

His appointment as an honorary fellow of Hertford College, Oxford has also recently been terminated.

Dewar has held a number of other directorships, including those of the Olivia Newton-John Cancer Research Institute, the Committee for Melbourne, and the Foundation for Australian Studies in China. He was also a member of the University Foreign Interference Taskforce, the University of Lincoln's 21st Century Lab Higher Education Reference Group, and the Champions of Change Coalition.

== Awards ==
In 2020, Dewar was made an Officer of the Order of Australia (AO) in the Australia Day Honours List "in recognition of his distinguished service to education through leadership roles in the universities sector, and to professional organisations".

== Other ==
Dewar has been married to conflict mediator Henrietta Barclay (with whom he has 3 daughters), Flinders MP Zoe McKenzie and his former (PWC contracted) La Trobe University acting Chief of Staff, Bel Clough.

In 2023, Dewar's and his then wife, Bel Clough’s 'Earthhouse' was featured in Season 10 (Episode 9) of Grand Designs Australia, described as "a radical underground house" on 25 acres at Whittlesea, Victoria.

The house has subsequently been placed on the market by Bel Clough.

Academic offices
Preceded by Patricia M. Davidson	Interim Vice-Chancellor of University of Wollongong; June 2024–present	Incumbent
