= List of Grand Designs Australia episodes =

Grand Designs Australia is an Australian observational series on The LifeStyle Channel. The series, which is a local adaptation of the British series of the same name, sees original host, Peter Maddison, and current host, Anthony Burke, chronicle the construction of grand and unusual houses.

== Series overview ==
Season	Episodes		Originally aired		Network
Season	Episodes		First aired	Last aired	Network
1	9		21 October 2010	16 December 2010	LifeStyle
2	10		5 April 2012	7 June 2012	LifeStyle
3	8		18 October 2012	6 December 2012	LifeStyle
4	10		10 October 2013	12 December 2013	LifeStyle
5	10		9 October 2014	11 December 2014	LifeStyle
Specials	3		4 June 2015	18 June 2015	LifeStyle
6	7		5 November 2015	17 December 2015	LifeStyle
Kevin McCloud's Top 10 GDA	1		20 April 2017	20 April 2017	LifeStyle
7	14		27 April 2017	8 February 2018	LifeStyle
8	10		17 July 2019	18 September 2019	LifeStyle
9	8		31 March 2021	19 May 2021	LifeStyle
10	16	8	5 May 2022	23 June 2022	LifeStyle
10	16	8	25 January 2023	15 March 2023	LifeStyle
11	10		10 October 2024	12 December 2024	ABC
12	10		16 October 2025	18 December 2025	ABC

== Episodes ==
=== Season 1 (2010) ===
No. overall	No. in season	Title	Location	Original release date	Viewers
1	1	"Bushfire House"	Callignee, Victoria	21 October 2010	N/A
After spending 2 years building his dream home in Callignee, Victoria, the worst bushfires in Victoria's history (Black Saturday) burnt the home of Chris Clarke to the ground. After recovering from the shock, Chris decides to rebuild his home on the same site, and the idea of Callignee 2 is born. Follow Chris on his journey to build his spectacular new home in the Australian bush.
2	2	"Very Small House"	Surry Hills, New South Wales	28 October 2010	N/A
Architect Domenic Alvaro and his partner Sue Bassett purchase a tiny corner car park (7m x 6m) and turn it into 220 square metres of fantastic living space. Despite a rapid pace of construction using prefabricated concrete components, their vertical build faces many interesting challenges. The design won a 2011 World Architecture Festival award
3	3	"Southport Heritage House"	Southport, Queensland	4 November 2010	N/A
Jan and Ed Gillman painstakingly restore a tumbled-down weatherboard (one of the oldest homes in the region) in Southport, to its former glory.
4	4	"Clovelly House"	Clovelly, New South Wales	11 November 2010	N/A
Julie and Patrick Eltridge purchase an asbestos-riddled house in Sydney's beachside Clovelly and in its place build a modern architecturally designed home using a Melbourne firm of 'pre-fab' builders, who custom build them a modular home that is trucked to Sydney and assembled on site.
5	5	"Lake Bennett House"	Lake Bennett, Northern Territory	18 November 2010	N/A
Trevor and Francoise Sullivan (and their friends) build a cyclone proof tropical tree house that is windowless and based on the shape of a 50 cent piece.
6	6	"Hamptons House"	Maudsland, Queensland	25 November 2010	N/A
On their 4,000 square metre block, Steve and Lisa Morley live the American dream and build a Hampton's style home in the Gold Coast hinterlands.
7	7	"Fish Creek Church House"	Fish Creek, Victoria	2 December 2010	N/A
Engineer Peter Riedel and his wife Mary purchase an 1870s church for $20,000 and re-build it into a beautiful home.
8	8	"Cottage Point House"	Cottage Point, New South Wales	9 December 2010	N/A
Drew Muirhead builds a spectacular Balinese resort style mansion in leafy Cottage Point. The end result has a private beach with boatshed and speedboat, but the journey to the finish line isn't easy with the slope of the block and access to it posing a number of building challenges.
9	9	"Indented Head House"	Indented Head, Victoria	16 December 2010	N/A
Ian McDonald and Rob Wilhelm build a spectacular $1.8 million dollar home overlooking Port Phillip Bay on the Bellarine Peninsula.

=== Season 2 (2012) ===
No. overall	No. in season	Title	Location	Original release date	Viewers
10	1	"Brighton Sixties"	Brighton, Victoria	5 April 2012	106,000
Over the years, Nick and Anna McKimm have almost made a hobby of renovating, selling and moving on. But with three young children, they're ready to lay down permanent roots and build their dream home. A sleek, modernist, 60's inspired family residence on a large, half acre block in Melbourne's bayside suburb, Brighton.
11	2	"Paynesville Industrial"	Paynesville, Victoria	12 April 2012	147,000
Ten years ago retired Civil Engineer Bernie Ryan and his wife Ruth, packed up their three kids and moved to Paynesville, a charming seaside town in Victoria's popular Gippsland Lakes region. Bernie's a tinkerer with a huge shed filled with crazy projects started in a flurry, but left unfinished.
12	3	"Five Dock Retro"	Five Dock, New South Wales	19 April 2012	N/A
Anne Potter loves all things retro – the fashion, the cars... even the hairstyles. So ten years ago, it was no surprise that she and husband Michael snapped up a modest 60's bungalow overlooking the harbour in Sydney's Five Dock.
13	4	"Kyneton Flat Pack"	Kyneton, Victoria	26 April 2012	140,000
Kyneton, a country town in Victoria's Macedon Ranges, is known for historic architecture and bustling farmers markets. It's the perfect place for foodies Rod Moore and Di Foggo – who are embarking on a huge life change. They're farewelling a classic Victorian home with traditional furnishings and building a brand new, cutting edge flat pack house on a rugged escarpment overlooking the racecourse.
14	5	"Trinity Beach Pole House"	Trinity Beach, Queensland	3 May 2012	134,000
Daniel Leipnik and Andrew Preston have long cherished the dream of a laid-back, barefoot life in the tropics. And they have found the ideal location at Trinity Beach near Cairns in Far North Queensland. Their ambitious new home will grace a hillside block bordering a World Heritage rainforest and overlooking the Coral Sea.
15	6	"Gladysdale Dry Stone House"	Gladysdale, Victoria	10 May 2012	94,000
For nine years, Michael and Sandy Rutledge have been making the weekend pilgrimage to their lush 20 acre property in Gladysdale, an hour east of Melbourne. Now they're leaving the city for a permanent tree change and building a new family home on their acreage.
16	7	"Stonyfell Watertank"	Stonyfell, South Australia	17 May 2012	110,000
Life in Adelaide, the driest capital city in Australia, has made Mike Dare and wife Lowen Partridge passionate about conserving water. Like many people, they decided to put a couple of water tanks in their new house. But these are tanks with a difference.
17	8	"Yellingbo Artist's House"	Yellingbo, Victoria	24 May 2012	120,000
Art teacher and sculptor Laurie Smith and his wife Renee Hoareau, a trained artist turned web designer, are both zealous art lovers; so joy of joys when, after years of searching they found the ideal block to create their 'sculpture in space'.
18	9	"Battery Point Glass House"	Battery Point, Tasmania	31 May 2012	114,000
Adventurous, outdoorsy types, Greg Kay and Trish Knight, live in the ideal spot to enjoy nature – right on the waterfront in Hobart's exclusive Battery Point. The plan is to subdivide, sell the heritage cottage at the front of the block and build a new house at the back, facing the water. But councils have a way of altering even the best laid plans – and after several set backs and a re-think, Greg and Trish find themselves embarking on an epic upsizing adventure.
19	10	"Steels Creek Earth House"	Steels Creek, Victoria	7 June 2012	119,000
Edd & Amanda lost everything when bushfires swept through Steels Creek. Determined to stay with the land they love, they're building a concrete bunker embedded in the landscape with one side facing the outside world.

=== Season 3 (2012) ===
No. overall	No. in season	Title	Location	Original release date	Viewers
20	1	"Mansfield Indoor/Outdoor"	Mansfield, Victoria	18 October 2012	123,000
Victoria's high country is the idyllic location of Pamela & Stuart's quaint little weekender but with a permanent move here looming, it's time to upsize. Will their new outward focussing house, have the same charm?
21	2	"Hampton Timber"	Hampton, Victoria	25 October 2012	130,000
Jenny & Brett are replacing their loved Californian Bungalow with a sculptural, Japanese style all timber house with wrap-around pool. Pure dedication ensures this uniquely challenging build triumphs despite the challenges.
22	3	"Balnarring Rammed Earth"	Balnarring, Victoria	1 November 2012	123,000
Eco conscious entertainers Claire and Lisa adore their hobby farming lifestyle on Victoria's Mornington Peninsula, but the cute 1930s beach shack they've long shared with two pugs has lost its once savoured charm. They're upgrading and building a sustainable, modernist, entertainers' home that blends sophisticated design elements with rammed earth, recycled materials and raw finishes. It all sounds glamorous and straightforward but with a zero contingency budget what happens when a wet winter meets an insidious clay soil?
23	4	"Warburton Arch House"	Warburton, Victoria	8 November 2012	N/A
Tyrone & Hailey follow the advice of a feng shui expert or 'energy ecologist' throughout construction of their new house. An owner-built labour of love, their passive solar building has a curved living roof planted with native grasses.
24	5	"Byron Bay Beach House"	Byron Bay, New South Wales	15 November 2012	158,000
Max and Mariella have been planning to relocate to Bryon Bay since the birth of their daughter Ruby. As successful property developers, an ambitious build shouldn't be a problem – but handing over control to a local building team is harder than they thought. From the outset they make fundamental changes to the design making it a headache for the builder and for Max. Something has to give – especially when the bank learns the house they're loaning money on isn't quite the house being built.
25	6	"Annandale Urban House"	Annandale, New South Wales	22 November 2012	176,000
Brett and Rees are the proud parents of three young boys and desperately need more space. They love their inner west community in Sydney's Annandale, so the plan is to build on the small empty allotment behind their apartment. The first sod has barely been turned when one of the heritage buildings on their boundary is in danger of collapsing. Exhausted by ongoing battles and a build that's months behind schedule – will Brett & Rees have enough grit and determination to see their project through to completion?
26	7	"Barossa Valley Glass House"	Barossa Valley, South Australia	29 November 2012	N/A
James & Helen plan to capture breathtaking Barossa views in their elegant new home. 60 metres long, 1 room wide and virtually all glass, it looks straightforward on paper. The complicated part is building it.
27	8	"Ocean View House"	Ocean View, Queensland	6 December 2012	173,000
There's nothing flimsy about Brunella & Carlo's contemporary home in Ocean View. It's 'semi brutalist' architecture designed to last and driven by Brunella's passion for concrete.

=== Season 4 (2013) ===
No. overall	No. in season	Title	Location	Original release date	Viewers
28	1	"Inverloch Sand Dune House"	Inverloch, Victoria	10 October 2013	120,000
After eight years of planning, Melbourne couple Glenn and Kate Morris are finally making a start on their striking, sustainable 'sand dune' house near Inverloch on Victoria's Gippsland coastline.
29	2	"South Melbourne Brick House"	South Melbourne, Victoria	17 October 2013	112,000
Greg and his partner knock down their old brick home to create a new one, with each brick being individually coloured.
30	3	"Torrens Park Modern Mansion"	Torrens Park, South Australia	24 October 2013	N/A
A multi-million dollar mansion built on a difficult hillside block of land.
31	4	"Hornsby Heights Adobe"	Hornsby Heights, New South Wales	31 October 2013	111,000
Kerri and Judi want to construct an adobe style building with clay rendered walls and exposed timber in Hornsby Heights, NSW.
32	5	"Richmond Inner City"	Richmond, Victoria	7 November 2013	154,000
An inner city house on a hidden block of land with no street frontage, built behind terrace houses.
33	6	"Forest Lodge Eco House"	Forest Lodge, New South Wales	14 November 2013	142,000
Chris and his family bought a 4.9m wide spot of land next to their existing house on which to expand onto to create a sustainable inner city home.
34	7	"Ilford Sheep Station"	Ilford, New South Wales	21 November 2013	110,000
The Bayfields build a house for their family of 6 on the highest point on their 1000-acre property.
35	8	"Hunters Hill Textural"	Hunters Hill, New South Wales	28 November 2013	171,000
A family of 3 knock down their house in the prestegous Sydney suburb of Hunters hill to, at the surprise of their neighbours, build a smaller house. The house will feature a large floating concrete slab with hanging gardens.
36	9	"King Island Whale Tail"	King Island, Tasmania	5 December 2013	173,000
A couple move from their home in Northern Australia to build their new home in the harsh environment of King Island in Bass Strait.
37	10	"Curved House"	Dynnyrne, Tasmania	12 December 2013	N/A
Self confessed hippies Cole and Jane Bradshaw bought a thin sliver of land on an exceptionally steep site only a landscaper could love, in the hilly suburb of Dynnyrne in Hobart …… a place they chose as much for the tight knit community it sits in, as for the location itself.

=== Season 5 (2014) ===
No. overall	No. in season	Title	Location	Original release date	Viewers
38	1	"The Graceville Container House"	Graceville, Queensland	9 October 2014	96,000
An experimental three storey house made entirely from 31 new shipping containers.
39	2	"Mt. Eliza Modern"	Mount Eliza, Victoria	16 October 2014	N/A
The single longest build in Grand Designs Australia's history. This 6 year build was all about getting their dream house absolutely perfect.
40	3	"Claremont Origami"	Claremont, Western Australia	23 October 2014	122,000
An architect, Ariane Prevost, at the peak of her career, puts it aside to design and build a house for herself and her husband Neil.
41	4	"Foxground Pavilion"	Foxground, New South Wales	30 October 2014	105,000
After 30 years as a civil engineer, Joe Cato sells his building business to spend more time with his kids and build a new house. This house will be completed entirely by rammed earth construction.
42	5	"Port Melbourne Urban Green"	Port Melbourne, Victoria	6 November 2014	N/A
Some people have the ability to see beyond the function of an object – to see it as a work of art – and it is that premise that has driven Melbourne doctors, Ian and Ann Howard, to create a home like no other. Their plan is to build a 3-storey house clad entirely with water tanks – massive 2-metre-high H-shaped black plastic beasts that will form the skin of their new house.
43	6	"Toowoomba English Farmhouse"	Toowoomba, Queensland	13 November 2014	132,000
After years working abroad, Sarah and English born husband Alistair Brodie-Fraser decided to relocate back to Sarah's home town of Toowoomba in Queensland. This time the move will be permanent – close to Sarah's extended family. But with Sarah's father being German, her mother Scottish and Alistair's connection with the UK, memories of Europe were bound to have some influence in the design of their new house.
44	7	"Williamstown Bluestone"	Williamstown, Victoria	20 November 2014	82,000
When Jason Bretell and Jennifer Pancari first set eyes on a dilapidated old bluestone cottage in the Melbourne bayside suburb of Williamstown, it was love at first sight. The 150-year-old derelict structure was left almost frozen in time with decaying tools, utensils, and other remnants amongst the ruins – bits and pieces Jason and Jen hope to salvage as they bring the cottage back to life.
45	8	"Brookfield Spotted Gum"	Brookfield, Queensland	27 November 2014	129,000
The brief to their architect was simple. A home that not only makes the very best of its location, but is truly unique. In short, as different as possible from the traditional ranch style and Queenslander neighbours.
46	9	"Pipers Creek Strawbale House"	Pipers Creek, Victoria	4 December 2014	N/A
Like many people, Dean and Sherril Lamb yearn for a simpler existence, for them and their three children. But unlike most people, they're actually going to try to make it happen. They've sold their successful fruit shop and home in Warragul and bought 40 acres in Pipers Creek in country Victoria; all in the pursuit of total self sufficiency.
47	10	"Faraday Aussie Bush House"	Faraday, Victoria	11 December 2014	80,000
Before Matt McLelland's wife Anne died six years ago, they'd been looking for a rural property to build on – a place to call home for them and for their four adult children to come to visit. So when Matt stumbled across 40 acres in central Victoria with spectacular views to Mt Alexander's granite hill side, he knew he'd found the spot.

=== Specials (2015) ===
No. overall	No. in season	Title	Location	Original release date	Viewers
48	1	"Brothers Yackandandah House"	Yackandandah, Victoria	4 June 2015	90,000
Artistic brothers bond over a spectacular one bedroom creation at Yackandandah.
49	2	"Harcourt House"	Harcourt, Victoria	11 June 2015	89,000
Art and Troy are swapping out their life running a grand old Bendigo bed and breakfast for a bold new and dramatically modern enterprise.
50	3	"Kinglake Fire Proof House"	Kinglake, Victoria	18 June 2015	87,000
A couple who are building a fire proof, sustainable, non toxic house at Kinglake, an hour out of Melbourne.

=== Season 6 (2015) ===
No. overall	No. in season	Title	Location	Original release date	Viewers
51	1	"5mx4m Inner City Design"	East Melbourne, Victoria	5 November 2015	102,000
While in the inner city suburb of East Melbourne in Victoria, a very small block is set to make way for a three storey totally green home with geo-thermal heating and cooling and a rooftop garden and spa. Photographer Ralph Alfonso has a very strong sense of how precious our environment is and how little space we really need to live in. His downsized style of living focuses on being as frugal as possible, using a ground-breaking and innovative environmental design. The thing is… the house footprint measures just 5 × 4 metres, making it grand in design, although miniature in size.
52	2	"1920s Electricity Substation"	Launceston, Tasmania	12 November 2015	89,000
Mark and Karen Bartkevicius spent two years pursuing the sale of an old electric substation in Launceston, Tasmania, which they then renovated into a modern home, whilst still keeping the charm of the original building intact.
53	3	"The Leaf and Song Tower"	Kuitpo, South Australia	19 November 2015	74,000
One of the most distinctive builds of the season takes us to a beautiful vineyard setting just over half an hour from Adelaide. Tailored specifically for new winemakers – opera singer Cate Foskett and her husband Nick, a Silicon Valley whiz kid – the Max Pritchard designed home is in the shape of a leaf, curved on both sides with a spine stone wall running through the middle. A two story 'song tower' with a library on the ground floor and a singing studio on the top floor formed the genesis of the design.
54	4	"Modern 1950s House"	North Balgowlah, New South Wales	26 November 2015	66,000
Set in an average suburban street in North Balgowlah, this Jetson's worthy pad – with diagonal structural steel base, floating boxed bedroom, concealed garage, crazy paving, and Tex Mex-meets-Palm Springs inspired garden, promises to push the boundaries.
55	5	"Turners Beach Tree House"	Turners Beach, Tasmania	3 December 2015	79,000
Draftsman Nigel Eberhardt is a conservationist at heart – a passion he shares with partner Nina, a school teacher. Their love for the natural environment saw them purchase one of the last remaining native bush blocks in Turners Beach, a beachside suburb brimming with neat houses and manicured lawns, on Tasmania's north coast, where they build a house around the already established trees.
56	6	"Deakin House"	Deakin, Australian Capital Territory	10 December 2015	113,000
Canberra couple Barbara and Bill Coyle have been lucky enough to live in houses designed by Australia's best known architects. They love modernist architecture so they engaged the right architect to design them something 70's. Bill an orthopaedic surgeon, has been diagnosed with Parkinson's disease. Their new house with its curved roofline and glass entrance is designed for the future when he'll be in a wheelchair.
57	7	"Northcote Vinegar Factory"	Northcote, Victoria	17 December 2015	66,000
In the Melbourne suburb of Northcote, the Skipping Girl Vinegar Factory was a siren call for sustainable architect, Adrian Light. But old buildings have a way of resisting change and this one is no exception. Adrian has big plans to turn what is essentially a four storey red brick warehouse with 20 huge concrete vinegar vats into a four bedroom sustainable home for his family. At every stage he is confronted with the realities of reworking a stubborn old, wet factory. As the months turn into years this really is a question of who will win?

=== Kevin McCloud's Top 10 Grand Designs Australia (2017) ===
No. overall	No. in season	Title	Location	Original release date	Viewers
58	1	"Kevin McCloud's Top 10 Grand Designs Australia"	Various	20 April 2017	88,000
Set in historic Homewood House in Surrey, England, Grand Designs Australia host Peter Maddison and Grand Designs host Kevin McCloud sit down with a cup of tea and an old fashioned slide slow to reminisce about the design features of each of the ten homes, selected from the past six seasons. The design gurus talk cladding, tiles and form, and with whiskey in hand, engage in some gentle banter over each other’s take on the architecture of their favourite builds. While the special looks over the past, it also serves as a teaser for the upcoming seventh season.

=== Season 7 (2017–18) ===
No. overall	No. in season	Title	Location	Original release date	Viewers
59	1	"North Bondi Urban Cliff"	North Bondi, New South Wales	27 April 2017	102,000
Brendan and Penelope have dreams of a multi-tiered, multi-million dollar home, complete with infinity pool on the side of a cliff in Bondi. But when they constantly change plans mid build, will it ever be finished?
60	2	"Maianbar Cross Laminated Timber"	Maianbar, New South Wales	4 May 2017	73,000
Sydney couple Phil and Ariana want an adventurous house, something cutting edge that hasn't been done before. This special house will cantilever out from their block and overlook the water at Maianbar.
61	3	"Verrierdale Tent House"	Verrierdale, Queensland	11 May 2017	84,000
Inland from Noosa in a lush tropical landscape sits Nick and Nicole's sail house. They have a daring design which they hope will look like a yacht moored on dry land and provide them with a true adventure in paradise.
62	4	"Hillbank Medieval"	Hillbank, South Australia	18 May 2017	65,000
Anglican Reverends Neil and Ruth have long harboured a desire to build their own home in the style of a Tudor farm house featuring timber boards and a church-like interior of hand-crafted exposed structural beams.
63	5	"Ocean Shores Chipboard"	Ocean Shores, New South Wales	25 May 2017	58,000
GP Zewlan and her electrician husband Tom, want an architect designed home in a great location on shoestring budget. Working within a tenuous loan framework, what they create is inspiring.
64	6	"Kensington Curvy"	Kensington, Victoria	1 June 2017	58,000
Architect Tim Hill has made his name designing small, radically shaped, timber houses. Now it's time for Tim's family to up-size to a new house that will be curvaceously shaped like a foot.
65	7	"Aldinga Beach Dune"	Aldinga, South Australia	8 June 2017	57,000
Set on a small block overlooking the Southern Ocean, this three-pod home straddles a pair of four-meter high sand dunes on the protected Aldinga Scrub conservation area on the South Australian coast.
66	8	"Stirling Glass Stone House"	Stirling, South Australia	15 June 2017	91,000
Six years ago Louise and Steve bought two acres of a rambling English garden in the Adelaide hills. Using the local stone their dream home will be a rustic two storey stone farm house with a modern twist.
67	9	"Hamilton Japanese Queenslander"	Hamilton, Queensland	22 June 2017	76,000
Steve Minon has a fascination for things Japanese. He fell in love with the work of an iconic Japanese architect Yo Shimada, who he contacted to design a house for him.
68	10	"Daylesford Long House"	Daylesford, Victoria	11 January 2018	94,000
Brisbane based architects Donovan Hill, helped Trace and Ronnen create the most original grand design, incorporating a giant greenhouse that encloses a house, garden, stables and animal pens.
69	11	"Tallebudgera Valley Queenslander"	Tallebudgera Valley, Queensland	18 January 2018	59,000
Doug and Yvette have lived on their idyllic 10 acre property in the Gold Coast for the last two years. On a whim they bought a 100 year old house, that will now make the 130 km journey to its new home on the back of a truck.
70	12	"French Island Barge"	French Island, Victoria	25 January 2018	56,000
With his own machinery and help from family and friends, Mike plans to build a large spotted gum clad home, in an off grid, koala filled paradise. However, he faces the challenge of transporting the materials via barge.
71	13	"Stanley Windmill"	Stanley, Tasmania	1 February 2018	53,000
Phillip lives in a quirky cluster of buildings -a shed and a heritage listed windmill. With the help of his architect friend Greg, they will link the historic structures into a contemporary, cohesive whole.
72	14	"Coombs Curtain Wall House"	Coombs, Australian Capital Territory	8 February 2018	N/A
When it comes to his family home, IT engineer Damien wants it filled with every hi tech feature. Computer controlled blinds, a two storey spiral glass staircase, and a custom air powered laundry chute.

=== Season 8 (2019) ===
No. overall	No. in season	Title	Location	Original release date	Viewers
73	1	"The House on the Hill"	Euroa, Victoria	17 July 2019	107,000
In the bush ranger territory of the Strathbogie Ranges, Eddie and Dot dream of a home with a magnificent 360 degree view. Can they work around the huge granite boulders to achieve their dream?
74	2	"One-Of-A-Kind Contemporary Home"	Elsternwick, Victoria	24 July 2019	80,000
Lori and Morgan are building a funky modern house on a tight suburban site. This family home will have a lot fun elements including a trapeze net, car parking stacker and a paper plane garden sculpture.
75	3	"Curl Curl Home"	Curl Curl, New South Wales	31 July 2019	102,000
Stephen has spent the last 15 years at the helm of his own construction company building homes for other people. Now with his first child on the way, he's finally building his own, and the plan is to make it grand.
76	4	"Lockleys Budget Home"	Adelaide, South Australia	7 August 2019	66,000
Tony and Tania want a million dollar house on a $400,000 budget. Working off handshake deals with the architect and builder, will their dream home be finished?
77	5	"The Tasmanian Pod House"	Lewisham, Tasmania	14 August 2019	79,000
Alice is a long term fan of the small house movement and on a sloping site facing the Southern Ocean. She's creating a petite 40 square metre pod, offering all she needs and nothing more.
78	6	"Two Storey Farmhouse"	Toolangi, Victoria	21 August 2019	77,000
Tabitha and Chris always dreamt of living in the forest. They bought 120 acres of rainforest in Toolangi and are building a farmhouse that will be a sustainable, economical, fire-proof and completely off grid.
79	7	"Ultimate Underground Man Shed"	Rivett, Australian Capital Territory	28 August 2019	68,000
Peter is building an underground eco bunker that's self-sufficient, sleek and completely one of a kind. From the outside it will eventually look like a bush garden, but below ground, a man cave.
80	8	"Modern Minimalist Home"	Suffolk Park, New South Wales	4 September 2019	60,000
Mike and Megan, a passionate pair of creatives are attempting to build a modernist house on a modest footprint. Mike designed the house himself to include only what they need, and only what they use.
81	9	"Lush Mountain House"	Tamborine Mountain, Queensland	11 September 2019	74,000
David and Sarah are in love with Mt Tamborine, the place they were married 22 years ago. They're now about to build a long-awaited home-away-from-home there, on lush mountain acreage boasting a rainforest and creek.
82	10	"Untested Building System"	Dee Why, New South Wales	18 September 2019	78,000
Barbara and Craig have built two companies from the ground up, so when they decided to embark on their dream home, it wasn't surprising they threw out the rule book and decided to do it their way, with a building system that's untested.

=== Season 9 (2021) ===
No. overall	No. in season	Title	Location	Original release date	Viewers
83	1	"Mystery Bay, NSW"	Mystery Bay, New South Wales	31 March 2021	58,000
When Rob and Sally buy land for their new home, they are faced with endless challenges. The build must withstand the elements, celebrate the amazing views and blend effortlessly into the surroundings. Is it possible?
84	2	"Hawthorn, VIC"	Hawthorn, Victoria	7 April 2021	57,000
David and Jenny have a dream to live in a super-modern terrace house in a traditional suburb. But their daring plan to create a three-storey home really pushes stress levels and finances to the limit.
85	3	"Tamar, TAS"	Tamar, Tasmania	14 April 2021	53,000
Matt and Eloise leave Melbourne for Tasmania. But the budget for their build means Matt has to do most of the work himself. An injury, pregnancy and a giant Great Dane puppy all add to the chaos!
86	4	"North Perth, WA"	North Perth, Western Australia	21 April 2021	43,000
Perth couple Angelo and Kasi love the bulky concrete buildings from the 1950s. But when they see the plans for their new family home, there are a few surprises. Will they embrace the unique design?
87	5	"Hawkesbury, NSW"	Hawkesbury, New South Wales	28 April 2021	68,000
Simon and Lauren want to convert a tiny 150-year-old church into their family home. This means honouring the history of the church while creating a modern house – will they succeed?
88	6	"Greenwich, NSW"	Greenwich, New South Wales	5 May 2021	38,000
Dion and Turi have big plans but a limited budget when they build a new, harbourside home. As the daring build, with a lap pool running through it, becomes all-consuming, there are doubts they will finish.
89	7	"Ascot, QLD"	Ascot, Queensland	12 May 2021	50,000
Joe and Hayley design high-end homes for others, but this is their chance to build their own. The curved, bold design includes a monumental staircase and a full-sized tennis court – but is it too ambitious?
90	8	"Coburg, VIC"	Coburg, Victoria	19 May 2021	59,000
Marc and Felicity have dreams of building a non-toxic, passive home and after years of work, the unthinkable happens – a fire sweeps through their beloved home just as they are about to move in. Will their dreams be shattered forever?

=== Season 10 (2022-23) ===
No. overall	No. in season	Title	Location	Original release date	Viewers
Part A
91	1	"Goobarragandra, NSW"	Goobarragandra, New South Wales	5 May 2022	43,000
Trevor and Jeanette are looking to build a very special home close to nature in which Trevor can move about easily in his wheelchair. When a 15 acre block with river frontage comes on the market, they pounce.
92	2	"Inverloch, VIC"	Inverloch, Victoria	12 May 2022	53,000
After a fire destroyed the much-loved homestead on Alistair and Belinda’s dairy farm, they embark on a bold new project to create a comfortable home that looks like a dairy shed, complete with silos for bedrooms.
93	3	"Carlton, VIC"	Carlton, Victoria	19 May 2022	57,000
Building a big house in inner city Melbourne is a tricky business. But architect Annalise and project manager Kim have a plan to turn their 1850s terrace into a multi-storied modern home with a triple car-stacker.
94	4	"Coffee Camp, NSW"	Coffee Camp, New South Wales	26 May 2022	25,000
Gary and Clare left the hustle and bustle of Sydney for a more peaceful pace with plans of building a spaceship-like domed house, reminiscent of the beautiful vaulted structures seen in Europe.
95	5	"Chain of Lagoons, TAS"	Chain of Lagoons, Tasmania	2 June 2022	51,000
Lynne and Paul have found a beautiful stretch of coastal wilderness with panoramic views over the Tasman Sea. With plans to build a huge modern home, Paul will project manage while living onsite.
96	6	"Clunes, NSW"	Clunes, New South Wales	9 June 2022	44,000
Retirees and childhood sweethearts Liz and Warren have taken on a hundred-acre Macadamia farm in Byron Bay hinterland, with grand plans to build an epic five-bedroom Mediterranean style villa-cum-castle.
97	7	"Bullsbrook, WA"	Bullsbrook, Western Australia	16 June 2022	33,000
Tani and Tim have plans to build a medieval 'earth castle' on their 60 acre property. Built into the sides of a man-made dam, there are plans for a drawbridge, turret, underground tunnels and even a moat.
98	8	"North Melbourne, VIC"	North Melbourne, Victoria	23 June 2022	40,000
Architect Ben and artist Tania decide to get creative with a tiny discarded scrap of land in one of North Melbourne's grittier back lanes. Can their grand dreams materialise from their not-so-grand budget?
Part B
99	9	"Whittlesea 'Earth', VIC"	Whittlesea, Victoria	25 January 2023	40,000
Bel and John are building a radical underground house on 25 spectacular acres at Whittlesea, in Victoria’s Plenty Valley – so named for its fertile farmland and magnificent views.
100	10	"Torquay 'Raw Concrete', VIC"	Torquay, Victoria	1 February 2023	37,000
Fiona and Sal are a match made in heaven. He loves the beach but she hates sand, but their biggest challenge to date is agreeing on the location and design of their new home!
101	11	"Newtown 'Hat Factory', NSW"	Newtown, New South Wales	8 February 2023	44,000
For Anita and Kris, warehouse living was a dream after raising their children in Sydney’s South. So when a 100-year-old building known as the Newton Hat Factory comes to market, they jump in.
102	12	"Clarence 'Container House', NSW"	Clarence, New South Wales	15 February 2023	42,000
Dennis and Karen have long dreamed of living in the wilderness and in 2013 they finally bought their perfect bush block in Clarence, a tiny pocket of the spectacular Blue Mountains, west of Sydney. However bushfires are an ongoing threat and designing a house to withstand them is a challenge. He sets about refurbishing seven giant shipping containers into his and Karen's new home.
103	13	"Carrickalinga 'Shed', SA"	Carrickalinga, South Australia	22 February 2023	48,000
Having spent two years scouting Australia on the hunt for the perfect block, Catherine and Mick settle of 50 acres atop the spectacular rolling hills of South Australia’s Fleurieu Peninsula.
104	14	"Norwood 'Gold', SA"	Norwood, South Australia	1 March 2023	28,000
For Dr Shiva Gunapu and his psychologist wife Rima, incorporating rich colours of their Indian heritage is an essential element for their new home.
105	15	"Dooralong 'Elemental', NSW"	Dooralong, New South Wales	8 March 2023	40,000
Electrican Mick takes on the challenge of a lifetime when he and artist wife Belynda decide to build their dream modernist home in the bucolic Dooralong Valley, on the NSW Central Coast.
106	16	"Coober Pedy 'Dug Out', SA"	Coober Pedy, South Australia	15 March 2023	38,000
Constructing and underground acropolis in the desert town of Coober Pedy is an ambitious undertaking, but when Paul’s parents retire, he wants to build them the ultimate 'underground Greek mansion'.

=== Season 11 (2024) ===
No. overall	No. in season	Title	Location	Original release date	Viewers
107	1	"Kevin McCloud Special"	Multiple Locations	10 October 2024	560,000
108	2	"Fish Creek"	Fish Creek, Victoria	17 October 2024	N/A
109	3	"Mount Waverley"	Mount Waverley, Victoria	24 October 2024	N/A
110	4	"Huon"	Huon, Tasmania	31 October 2024	N/A
111	5	"Benowa"	Benowa, Queensland	7 November 2024	N/A
112	6	"Sutton Farm"	Sutton Farm, New South Wales	14 November 2024	N/A
113	7	"Surry Hills"	Surry Hills, New South Wales	21 November 2024	N/A
114	8	"Strath Creek"	Strath Creek, Victoria	28 November 2024	N/A
115	9	"Buderim"	Buderim, Queensland	5 December 2024	N/A
116	10	"Newton Impossible"	Newtown, New South Wales	12 December 2024	N/A

=== Season 12 (2025) ===
No. overall	No. in season	Title	Location	Original release date	Viewers
117	1	"Cygnet Earthship"	Cygnet, Tasmania	16 October 2025	553,000
118	2	"Horse Shoe Hill"	Bald Knob, Queensland	23 October 2025	526,000
119	3	"Rye Cave"	Rye, Victoria	30 October 2025	559,000
120	4	"Dover Heights"	Dover Heights, New South Wales	6 November 2025	543,000
121	5	"Blue Mountains Tardis"	Blue Mountains, New South Wales	13 November 2025	573,000
122	6	"Sherwood River"	Sherwood, Queensland	20 November 2025	N/A
123	7	"Yass Earth Berm"	Yass Valley, New South Wales	27 November 2025	N/A
124	8	"Interlaken Lodge"	Interlaken, Tasmania	4 December 2025	N/A
125	9	"Hunter Valley"	Hunter Valley, New South Wales	11 December 2025	N/A
126	10	"Yarraville Pigeon"	Yarraville, Victoria	18 December 2025	N/A

== Home media (DVD) ==
Season 7 was the final season to be made available on physical media (DVD).

Season	Episodes	DVD release dates			
Season	Episodes	Region 1	Region 2	Region 4	Discs
1	9	—N/a	—N/a	2 August 2011	3
2	10	—N/a	—N/a	23 August 2012	3
3	8	—N/a	—N/a	6 March 2013	2
4	10	—N/a	—N/a	2 April 2014	3
5	10	—N/a	—N/a	11 March 2015	3
6	10	—N/a	—N/a	23 March 2016	3
7	14	—N/a	—N/a	2 May 2018	4
