= Anthony Burke (architect) =

Australian architect and television presenter

- Born: 1970 or 1971 (age 54–55); Northern Beaches, Sydney, Australia
- Education: Columbia University, New York
- Occupations: Architect, professor & TV presenter
- Years active: 2021 – present (TV)
- Organization(s): University of Technology Sydney; Australian Broadcasting Corporation
- Known for: Host of Grand Designs Australia
- Spouse: Kylie
- Children: 2
- Website: anthonyburke.au

Anthony Burke is an Australian professor of architecture and television presenter, who is best known for being the host of Grand Designs Australia since 2024, he is also currently a professor at the University of Technology Sydney (UTS).

== Early life and education ==
Burke was born in the Northern Beaches of Sydney, New South Wales, around 1971.

Burke has a Master of Science degree in Advanced Architectural Design (M.S. AAD) from Columbia University in New York after graduating in 2000, and a first-degree honours bachelor of architecture from the University of New South Wales received in 1996.

== Career ==
Anthony Burke was a director for the architectural design firm Offshore Studio from 2000 to 2016.

From 2002 to 2007 Burke was an assistant professor at the University of California, Berkeley. He was a guest professor at various institutions including the Beijing Institute of Technology in China, the Bandung Institute of Technology in Indonesia and various other places. He started working for UTS as an associate professor in 2010.

Burke was co-creative director of Venice Architecture Biennale festival 2012 at Australian pavilion with Gerard Reinmuth, directing the 40th anniversary of the Sydney Opera House with the Danish Ministry of Culture. He spoke at TEDxSydney being observed by FremantleMedia producers and was selected as presenter for series 4 of Restoration Australia in 2021 by Brooke Bayvel, succeeding Stuart Harrison as host.

He has chaired the Australian Design Centre, and has been a curator for the Art Gallery of New South Wales. Since August, 2023 he has written articles for ABC News.

== Personal life ==
Anthony Burke currently resides in the Inner West of New South Wales with his wife Kylie who he met when he was 20 while working as a bartender at the Harbord Diggers Memorial Club. They have two children, both of whom are now adults.

His father died of cancer when Burke was 27 years old.

== TV appearances ==
Burke has hosted Restoration Australia since its fourth series in 2021, he also co-presented Grand Designs Transformations with Yasmine Ghoniem. Burke began hosting Grand Designs Australia from 2024 succeeding Peter Maddison who presented Grand Designs Australia from 2010 to its tenth series in 2023 while it was on Foxtel. The first episode of Grand Designs Australia's eleventh series was co-presented by Kevin McCloud. Burke presented and produced the 6-episode ABC International series, Culture by Design, which premiered on 20 April 2025.

Media offices
Preceded by Stuart Harrison	Presenter of Restoration Australia; 2021–present	Incumbent
New title	Co-presenter of Grand Designs Transformations; 2024–present	Incumbent
Preceded by Peter Maddison	Presenter of Grand Designs Australia; 2024–present	Incumbent
