= Grand Designs Transformations =

- Presented by: Anthony Burke; Yasmine Ghoniem
- Country of origin: Australia
- No. of seasons: 2
- No. of episodes: 16

Production
- Producer: Chris Perry
- Production location: Australia wide
- Running time: 60 mins (including ads)
- Production company: Fremantle Australia

Original release
- Network: ABC
- Release: 4 January 2024

Grand Designs Transformations is a spin-off of Grand Designs Australia, an adaptation of the British TV series Grand Designs. The show documents people who attempt to renovate their dream homes and the challenges they face. It began airing on the ABC on 4 January 2024 and is hosted by Anthony Burke and Yasmine Ghoniem.

It is the first original series to air on the ABC after it bought the rights from Foxtel in 2023.

== History ==
In March 2023, the ABC bought the rights to Grand Designs Australia and any subsequent spin-offs from Foxtel. In November 2023, the series was confirmed at the ABC's 2024 upfronts, including a format which will follow renovations instead of new builds, and the announcement of new hosts Anthony Burke and Yasmine Ghoniem. The series first premiered on 4 January 2024. A second season began airing on 8 January 2026.

== Episodes ==
Season	Episodes	Originally aired		Network
Season	Episodes	First aired	Last aired	Network
1	8	4 January 2024	22 February 2024	ABC
2	8	8 January 2026	26 February 2026	ABC

=== Season 1 (2024) ===
No. overall	No. in season	Title	Location(s)	Original release date	Viewers (Note: From 28 January 2024, OzTAM ratings changed. Viewership data will now focus on National Total ratings instead of the 5 metro centres and overnight shares, meaning from Episode 5, only National total ratings will be added to episodes.)
1	1	"Episode 1"	Henley Beach & Gold Coast	4 January 2024	326,000
In Adelaide's Henley Beach, Paul and Marie transform an electricity converter station into a high-end entertainer's home, while on the Gold Coast, Chris and Antoinette reimagine a run-down house into a coastal retreat.
2	2	"Episode 2"	Northern Beaches & Melbourne	11 January 2024	315,000
In two inspiring transformations, a couple turns a simple pavilion house on Sydney's northern beaches into a stylish pad filled with bespoke marble furniture and, in Melbourne, a family creates a flamboyant forever bathroom.
3	3	"Episode 3"	Mornington Peninsula & Sydney	18 January 2024	291,000
On the Mornington Peninsula, an overgrown sloping bush block is transformed into a family retreat designed to embrace its natural surrounds, while a heritage-listed mid-century classic home in Sydney gets a modern upgrade.
4	4	"Episode 4"	Glenbrook & North Balgowlah	25 January 2024	217,000
A dilapidated 1960s duplex in the Blue Mountains gets a Moroccan makeover, while in Sydney can a giant boulder the size of a backyard be transformed into a rock top, poolside paradise?
5	5	"Episode 5"	South Yarra & Flemington	1 February 2024	528,000
A little Melbourne workers' cottage gets a radical reimagining as a Mid Century Palm Springs oasis, while across town, a backyard shed is transformed into a Japanese bathhouse.
6	6	"Episode 6"	Belmont & Oatlands	8 February 2024	553,000
In Geelong Victoria, Luke and Bree restore a Victorian cottage and add on a massive contemporary extension, while in the historic Tasmanian village of Oatlands, Karen and Luke restore a sandstone Georgian cottage.
7	7	"Episode 7"	St Kilda & Blackwall	15 February 2024	517,000
In two challenging transformations, a Melbourne couple turn a drab duplex into a spacious Miami-inspired home, while a NSW couple, Jeannette Carter and Ashley De Abel, on a shoe-string budget create a tiny guest pavilion for visiting family and friends.
8	8	"Episode 8"	Blackburn	22 February 2024	562,000
With two transformations on one site, builder Dylan tries to retrofit a draughty cottage into a fully sustainable home while landscape architect Tylah's plans for a garden oasis are battered with financial constraints.

=== Season 2 (2026) ===
No. overall	No. in season	Title	Location(s)	Original release date	Viewers
9	1	"Mitcham White & Fitzroy Fun House"	Mitcham & Fitzroy	8 January 2026	N/A
10	2	"Teneriffe Tree House & Dubbo Garden"	Teneriffe & Dubbo	15 January 2026	N/A
11	3	"Coburg Shag Manor & Burnside Coach House"	Coburg & Burnside	22 January 2026	N/A
12	4	"Turkish Queenslander & Newstead Bath House"	Brisbane & Newstead	29 January 2026	N/A
13	5	"Booker Bay Studio & St Peters Extension"	Booker Bay & St Peters	5 February 2026	N/A
14	6	"Balaclava Hat Factory & Paddington Japanese"	Balaclava & Paddington	12 February 2026	N/A
15	7	"Arncliffe Italianate & Toukley Granny Pad"	Arncliffe & Toukley	19 February 2026	N/A
16	8	"Mulgrave Spanish Arch & Sandford Glasshouse"	Mulgrave & Sandford	26 February 2026	N/A
