= Kjellgren Kaminsky Architecture =

Swedish architecture firm

Kjellgren Kaminsky Architecture is an architecture firm based in Göteborg, Sweden. It works with architecture in its broadest meaning ranging from furniture to city planning, from theory to practice. In 2007, it won the international architect competition for a new dancehall/restaurant in Falsterbo (southern part of Sweden), which was inaugurated in 2009. The project won the Skånes Arkitekturpris. In 2021, Fredrik Kjellgren left the office, which was later run by Joakim Kaminsky under the name Kaminsky Arkitektur.

== Publications ==
Ecological Architecture, Chris van Uffelen (ed.), Braun, 2009, p. 48-49
Desire, The shape of things to come, R. Klanten, S. Ehmann, A. Kupetz, S. Moreno, A. Mollard (ed.), Gestalten, 2008

== Notes and references ==
Carlsson, David Worlds first passive museum David Report, Accessed April 10, 2008
Bright, Christopher Swedish Prefab Dwell, Accessed May 19, 2008
Passive Houses Tropolism, Accessed Mars 05, 2008
Pirate Chair Designerblog, Accessed Mars 24, 2008
Kjellgren Kaminsky设计Passive Houses Interior Design, Accessed April 7, 2008 ArchDaily , September 24, 2011 Arkitektur, November 3, 2011
