= Võ Trọng Nghĩa =

Vietnamese architect

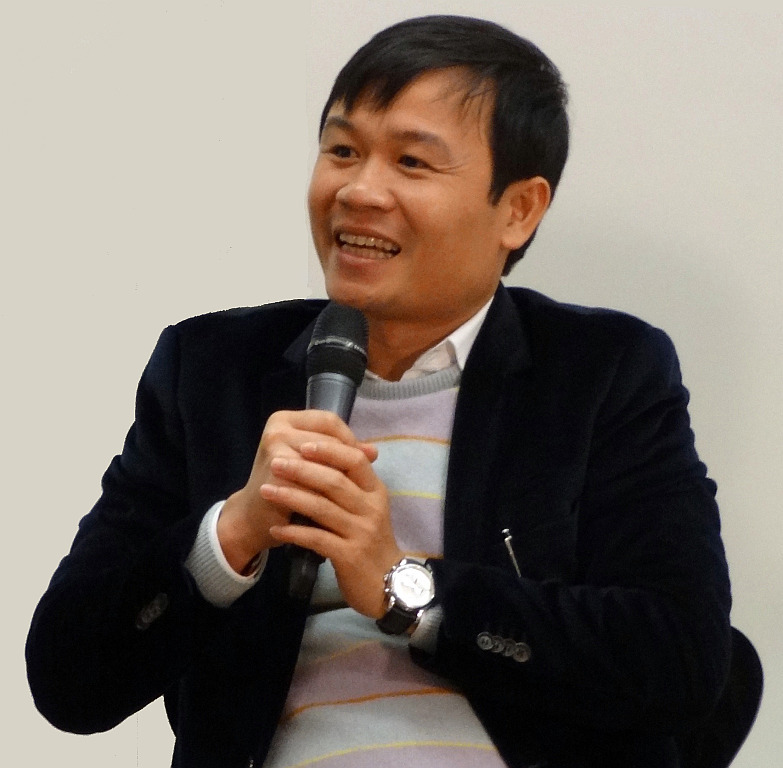
- Võ Trọng Nghĩa in 2014
- Born: 1976 (age 49–50); Quảng Bình Province, Vietnam
- Education: University of Tokyo
- Occupation: Architect
- Awards: Architect of the Year 2012
- Practice: Vo Trong Nghia Architects

Võ Trọng Nghĩa is a Vietnamese architect.

== Career ==
Võ Trọng Nghĩa studied architecture at the Nagoya Institute of Technology and the University of Tokyo, earning his MA. Back in Vietnam he established Võ Trọng Nghĩa Architects in 2006. Võ developed sustainable architectural design by integrating inexpensive, local materials and traditional skills with contemporary aesthetics and modern methodologies.

Nghĩa began practising meditation in 2012 and later practised intensive meditation at the Pa-Auk Forest Monastery in Myanmar from 2017 to 2020. Meditation subsequently became part of the working culture of his architectural practice. In 2016, The Saturday Paper reported that staff at the firm's Hanoi and Ho Chi Minh City offices meditated for at least two hours each working day and were paid to attend Vipassana meditation retreats. In a 2021 interview, Nghĩa said that the firm continued to meditate for two hours per day and that its working practices were influenced by the five precepts of Buddhism.

Nghĩa has connected meditation with his approach to architecture and the natural environment. He has said that meditation improves his concentration during the design process, while his practice seeks to reconnect people with nature through architecture. This relationship was explored in VTN Architects' installation Human–Meditation–Nature at the 2016 Venice Architecture Biennale, a bamboo and plant structure in which visitors were invited to meditate and reconsider their relationship with nature.

== Awards ==
- World Architecture Festival 2014 - Winner of "House", "Hotel & Leisure" and "Education Future Projects" categories
- ARCASIA Building of the Year 2014
- WAN 21 for 21 Awards 2012
- Vietnamese Architect of the Year 2012 (Ashui Awards)

== Selected projects ==
Some of his best-known works are the Vietnam Pavilion for the Milan Expo 2015, the Farming Kindergarten, in Dong Nai, Vietnam and the House for Trees, in Ho Chi Minh City, Vietnam.
