= The Small House (Domenic Alvaro) =

House in Sydney, Australia

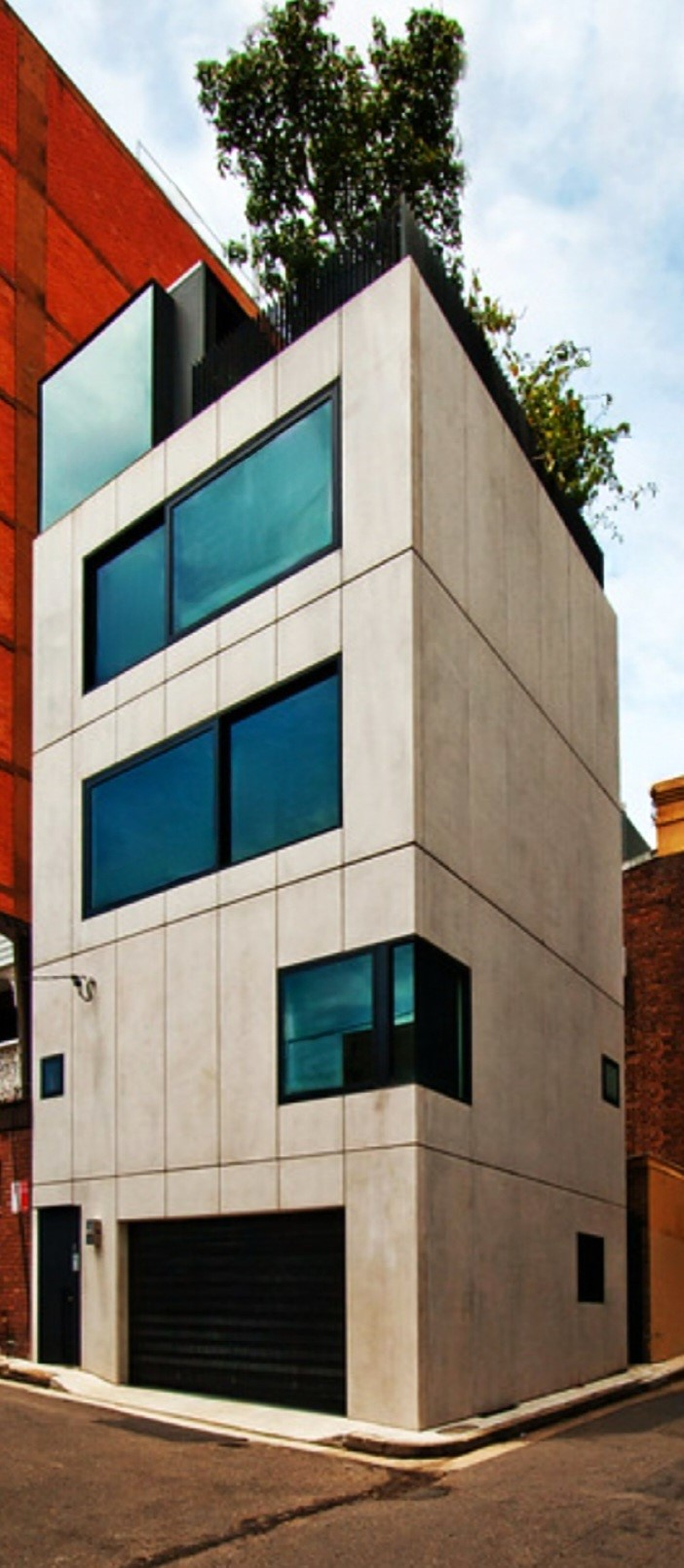
Small House by Domenic Alvaro

The Small House is a five-storey family house in Surry Hills, Sydney, Australia. The house has become known for its size, the customized dimensions of the building plot and also through a TV show that focuses on interesting and unusual buildings.

== History ==
In 2010, architect Domenic Alvaro (a member of the Woods Bagot architecture firm) and his partner Sue Bassett decided to purchase a building plot near the centre of Sydney to build a house. Due to high land prices, their real estate agent offered them three parking spaces for purchase, totalling 6x7 metres (~19.6×23 ft). Domenic and Sue eventually bought the land, unsure whether the building would be permitted. They eventually received a building permit from the city and it took a year to build the house. It was completed in 2011. The house was documented in the second episode of the first series of the LifeStyle Channel's Grand Design Australia television series. The house was designed by Alvaro himself.

=== Layout ===
On the ground floor there is a garage and storage rooms. On the first floor there is a bathroom and a bedroom, on the second floor a living room. On the third a dining room with kitchen and on the fourth a small study with roof terrace.

=== Awards ===
The house has received the following awards:

- 2011 World House of the Year, World Architecture Festival
- 2011 AIA National Award for Small Project Architecture, Australian Institute of Architects
