= Berry Sport and Recreation Centre =

Sport and recreation center in Berry, New South Wales, Australia

- Interactive map of Berry Sport and Recreation Centre
- Address: 660 Coolangatta Road, Berry NSW 2535
- Coordinates: 34°47′39″S 150°42′11″E
- Acreage: 62 hectares (150 acres)

Construction
- Built: 2007
- Cost: $AUD 1.3 million
- Architect: Allen Jack+Cottier
- Builder: BATMAC Constructions Pty Limited

Website
- Berry Sport and Recreation Centre

Berry Sport and Recreation Centre in Berry, New South Wales, Australia, caters for family, vacation and school camps as well as conference and facility hire. The Centre is managed by NSW Sport and Recreation.

== Recreation Hall ==
Berry Sport and Recreation centre has an award-winning recreation hall.

Architect	Allen Jack+Cottier
Year of Completion	2007
Project Team	Michael Heenan, John Whittingham, Kristina Neveriova, Kj Phua
Structural Engineer	Appleyard Forrest Consulting
Mechanical Engineer	Umow Lai Enginuity
Electrical	Umow Lai Enginuity
Hydraulic	J & M Group
Landscape	Mather & Associates
Builder	BATMAC Constructions Pty Limited
Location	Berry, South Coast of New South Wales
Address	660 Coolangatta Road, Berry NSW 2535
Function	Multi-purpose recreation hall for indoor sports such as netball, basketball, volleyball, rock climbing as well as dance, film and theatre performances
Areas	60 Hectares
Cost	$AUD 1.3 million

=== Inspiration ===
The Berry Sport and Recreation Centre is designed dominantly with the idea of simple investigation of capture and escape of light within and out of the building during the day and to blend this massive and heavy farm-like building into the night sky at night in order to integrate the structure into the existing site.

The initial brief was to aim for a simple robust multipurpose recreation hall within a secure economic constraint, while allocating a safe and enclosed environment for children and adults.

=== Architecture ===
There are five hundred irregular starlight holes arrayed and perforated on the finished concrete walls.

The penetration and movement of the sunlight at different times within the building illustrated a regular animation of the floor in terms of intensity and colour throughout the day. While during the night where the light source as well as the skies is inverted, the building itself has becomes a set of illuminating starlight which blending with the night sky.

=== Awards ===
2008 Australian Institute of Architects (AIA) Blacket Prize for Regional Architecture

2008 Australian Institute of Architects (AIA) Award for Public Architecture

2009 World Architecture Festival (WAF) Winner in Sport Category

2009 Concrete Institute of Australia Award for Excellence in Concrete
