= Luminous at Darling Quarter =

Coordinates: 33°52′30″S 151°12′8.67″E

Luminous Interactive is a digital art platform created by Lendlease in collaboration with Ramus Illumination. It officially opened on 18 May 2012 in the Darling Quarter Precinct, Sydney central business district (CBD).

Luminous at Darling Quarter is a permanent platform solely for illuminated digital 'art' – both animated and static. The 'canvas' extends over four levels of two campus-style buildings, covering 557 windows in total, and presents a digital façade spanning a distance of 150 meters. The artistic and design direction was set by international light artist Bruce Ramus, with Ramus studio responsible for design management and production of the work. Fixtures were manufactured by Australian architectural lighting specialists Klik Systems using advanced LED systems.

== Interactive ==
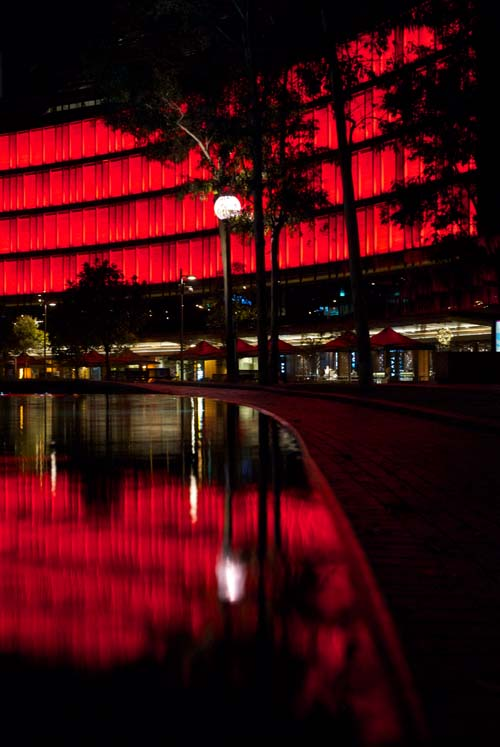
Lights on Darling Quarter

The online component of Luminous is similar to Project Blinkenlights, a Berlin digital light installation, and allows use by the public.

== Luminous concept ==
The Commonwealth Bank occupying the buildings is joint partner in the project along with the Sydney Harbour Foreshore Authority and Lendlease. The consortium selected Bruce Ramus as the first artist, Artistic Director and Lighting Designer for Luminous.

== Technology ==
At Darling Quarter, each window forms a 'pixel' in the canvas and forms an animated picture when viewed from far away. The system uses RGBW LEDs (red, green blue and white light emitting diodes) for colour. It also integrates music using graphic synchronisation to visualise sound-based designs. Darling Quarter uses automated timber louvres to reflect light (running along the windowsills, angled upwards with a 10-degree spreader lens). The lighting technology is powered using solar panels.

== Darling Quarter ==
Lendlease designed and constructed Darling Quarter for owner APPF Commercial and first proposed the idea of a permanent space for illuminated art. Darling Quarter precinct includes a community green, children’s playground, and a large number of world-food restaurants, cafes and bars, and reflects Lend Lease’s enthusiasm for iconic new spaces for future generations.
