= Peter Maddison =

Australian architect and television presenter

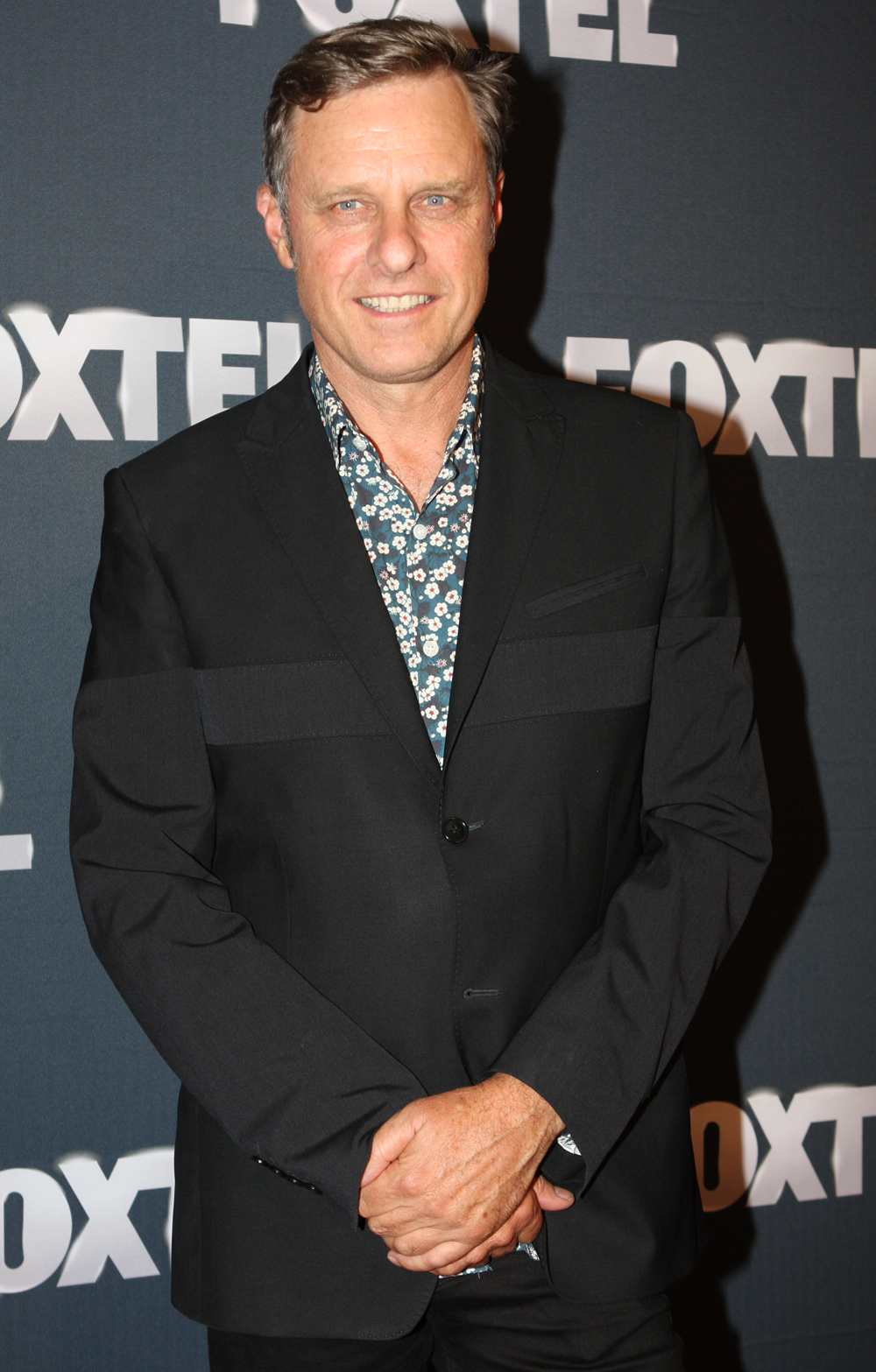
Maddison at the Foxtel 2013 Launch Event, Fox Studios Australia, Moore Park, Sydney, Australia, in February 2013

Peter Maddison is an Australian architect and television presenter. He is best known for presenting the TV series Grand Designs Australia, which has been shown in Australia, New Zealand, the Netherlands and the UK.

== Early life and education ==
Maddison graduated in architecture from the Royal Melbourne Institute of Technology in 1983, having studied as a mature student after failing his final year at high school.

== TV appearances ==
Grand Designs Australia was filmed in 2009 by the Lifestyle Channel, who chose Maddison as someone "who could best articulate the grandeur of Grand Designs and also the Australianness we are looking for." The series was first broadcast to Australia in October 2010. It was subsequently broadcast by Channel 4 to the UK.

Maddison was named 'Best New Talent' at the 9th annual ASTRA Awards in 2011.

== Career ==
Maddison is a practising architect, having started work as a student in 1978 with Peter Crone & Associates. He subsequently worked with Morris & Pirotta Architects, Cocks & Carmichael Architects, and was a Partner with McIntyre Partnership Architects & Urban Planners, before founding his own practice Maddison Architects Pty Ltd in 1988. Maddison is a long-standing member of the Australian Institute of Architects' Small Practice Forum and Awards Taskforce.

== Personal life ==
Maddison grew up in Parkdale near Melbourne. He currently lives in Brighton and has a holiday house on Phillip Island. Maddison is married to Andrea with children Woody, Ruby and Finn.
