= Grand Designs Australia =

Australian TV series

- Presented by: Peter Maddison; Anthony Burke
- Theme music composer: David Lowe
- Opening theme: Grand Designs
- Country of origin: Australia
- No. of seasons: 12
- No. of episodes: 112 (plus 4 specials) (list of episodes)

Production
- Production location: Australia wide
- Running time: 60 minutes
- Production company: Fremantle Australia

Original release
- Network: LifeStyle
- Release: 21 October 2010 – 15 March 2023
- Network: ABC
- Release: 10 October 2024 – present

Grand Designs Australia is an Australian spin-off of the British TV series Grand Designs. The show documents people who attempt to build a custom-designed house and the challenges they face. It originally aired on Lifestyle and was hosted by the architect Peter Maddison.

The series renewed more episodes for the 10th season in October 2022 at Foxtel's 2023 upfronts, which is split into two parts and was intended to be the final season of the series. However, in March 2023 the series was renewed by the ABC. In November 2023, the series was confirmed at ABC's 2024 upfronts, which included the announcement Maddison will be replaced by Anthony Burke as host, and a spinoff series, Grand Designs Transformations, which follows renovations instead of new builds, has been commissioned with hosts Burke and Yasmine Ghoniem. Grand Designs Transformations premiered on 4 January 2024. In September 2024, it was announced the series will return on 10 October 2024 and will also feature Grand Designs UK host, Kevin McCloud, alongside Anthony Burke in a premiere special. The twelfth season premiered on 16 October 2025.

== Format ==
The Australian edition follows its British lead and, generally, begins with Maddison meeting the individuals constructing a "unique" build; this is followed by a CAD (Computer Aided Design) of the layout of the build. As the build progresses, Maddison visits the site to interview the build clients and will, occasionally, interview other persons relevant to the project such as architects and site managers. Finally, Maddison visits the site, at a planned end of the build and interviews the project clients on life in their new house (if completed) and the challenges they encountered in pursuing the project.

== Episodes and spin-offs ==
| Season | Episodes | | Originally aired | | Network |
| Season | Episodes | | First aired | Last aired | Network |
|---|---|---|---|---|---|
| 1 | 9 | | 21 October 2010 | 16 December 2010 | LifeStyle |
| 2 | 10 | | 5 April 2012 | 7 June 2012 | LifeStyle |
| 3 | 8 | | 18 October 2012 | 6 December 2012 | LifeStyle |
| 4 | 10 | | 10 October 2013 | 12 December 2013 | LifeStyle |
| 5 | 10 | | 9 October 2014 | 11 December 2014 | LifeStyle |
| Specials | 3 | | 4 June 2015 | 18 June 2015 | LifeStyle |
| 6 | 7 | | 5 November 2015 | 17 December 2015 | LifeStyle |
| Kevin McCloud's Top 10 GDA | 1 | | 20 April 2017 | 20 April 2017 | LifeStyle |
| 7 | 14 | | 27 April 2017 | 8 February 2018 | LifeStyle |
| 8 | 10 | | 17 July 2019 | 18 September 2019 | LifeStyle |
| 9 | 8 | | 31 March 2021 | 19 May 2021 | LifeStyle |
| 10 | 16 | 8 | 5 May 2022 | 23 June 2022 | LifeStyle |
| 10 | 16 | 8 | 25 January 2023 | 15 March 2023 | LifeStyle |
| 11 | 10 | | 10 October 2024 | 12 December 2024 | ABC |
| 12 | 10 | | 16 October 2025 | 18 December 2025 | ABC |

A two-part spin-off series titled Grand Designs Australia Revisited premiered on 15 April 2013. The series featured the Surry Hills Small House and the Clovelly Modular episodes.

== Broadcast ==
The series has aired on Channel 4 in the United Kingdom.

== Exhibition ==
Grand Designs Australia Live launched in Sydney in October 2011 and again in Melbourne in September 2012.

== Awards ==
| Year | Award | Category | Result | Ref. |
|---|---|---|---|---|
| 2025 | TV Week Logies | Best Lifestyle Program | Nominated | |
