= Dania =

Dania may also refer to:

- Medieval Latin name for Denmark, named for the Dani tribe
- Dania Academy, usually referred to as Dania, a business academy with eight campuses in Denmark
- Dania College, one of the oldest colleges in Bangladesh
- Dania Park, a park in Malmö, Sweden
- Dania transcription, a transcription standard of the Danish language

== Places ==
- Dania Beach, Florida, a city in Broward County, United States
- Dania, Ivory Coast, a town and sub-prefecture in Sassandra-Marahoué District

== People with the given name Dania ==
- Dania Enwer (born 1992), Pakistani television actress
- Dania Gutiérrez, Mexican bioengineer, researcher, and LGBTQ+ activist
- Dania Khatib (born 1973), Lebanese singer
- Dania Méndez (born 1992), Mexican model and TV personality
- Dânia Neto (born 1983), Portuguese actress
- Dania Pérez (born 1973), Cuban cyclist
- Dania Ramirez (born 1979), Dominican-American actress
- Dania Vizzi (born 1995), American sport shooter

== See also ==
- Dacia (disambiguation)
- Danica (disambiguation)
- Dhania, an alternative name for coriander
