= Västra hamnen =

Neighbourhood of Malmö, Sweden

- Neighbourhood
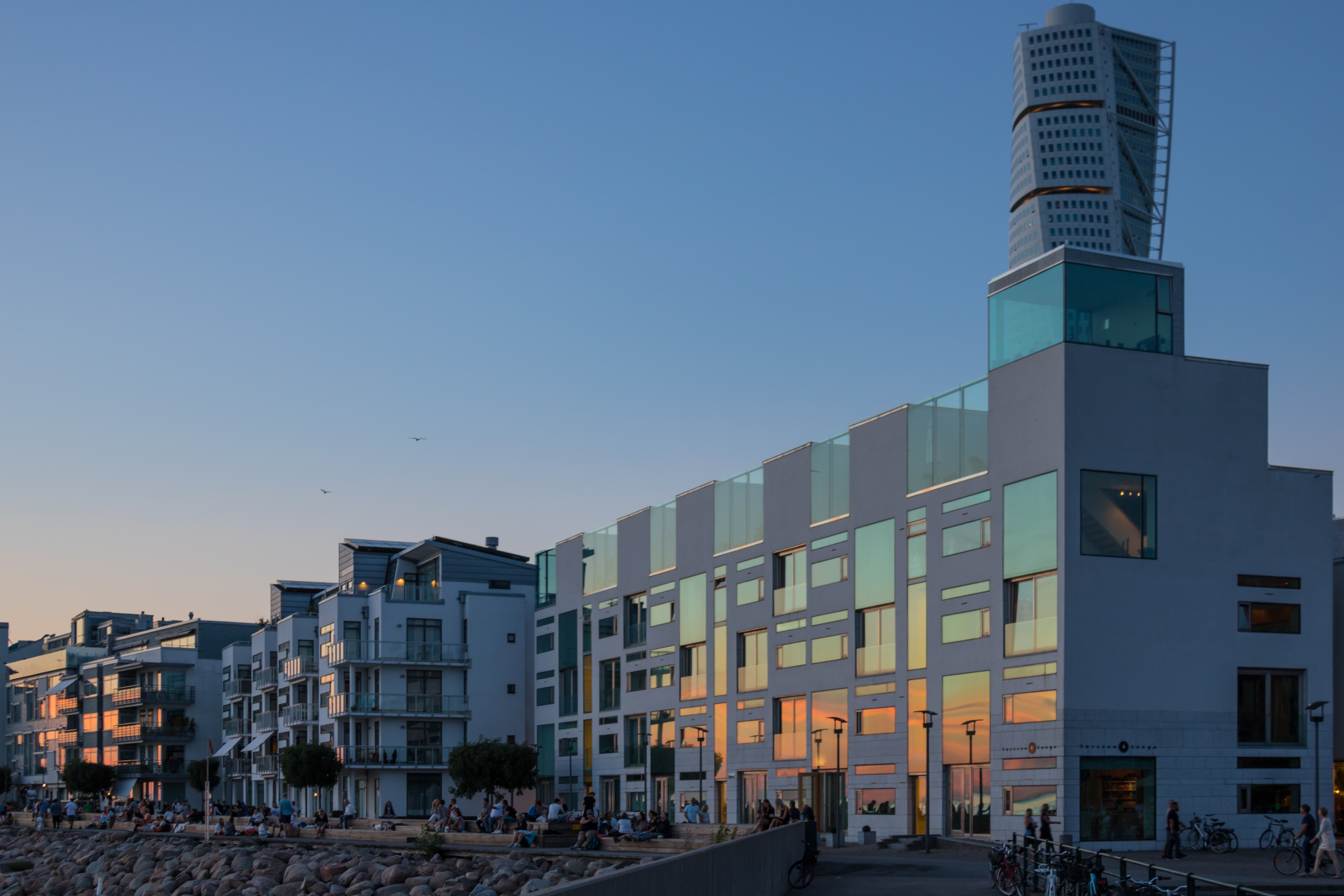
- Västra hamnen, Turning Torso at the right.
- Interactive map of Västra hamnen
- Coordinates: 55°36′44″N 12°58′47″E
- Country: Sweden
- Province: Skåne
- County: Skåne County
- Municipality: Malmö Municipality
- Borough of Malmö: Centrum

Population (1 January 2011)
  - Total: 4,512
- Time zone: UTC+1 (CET)
  - Summer (DST): UTC+2 (CEST)

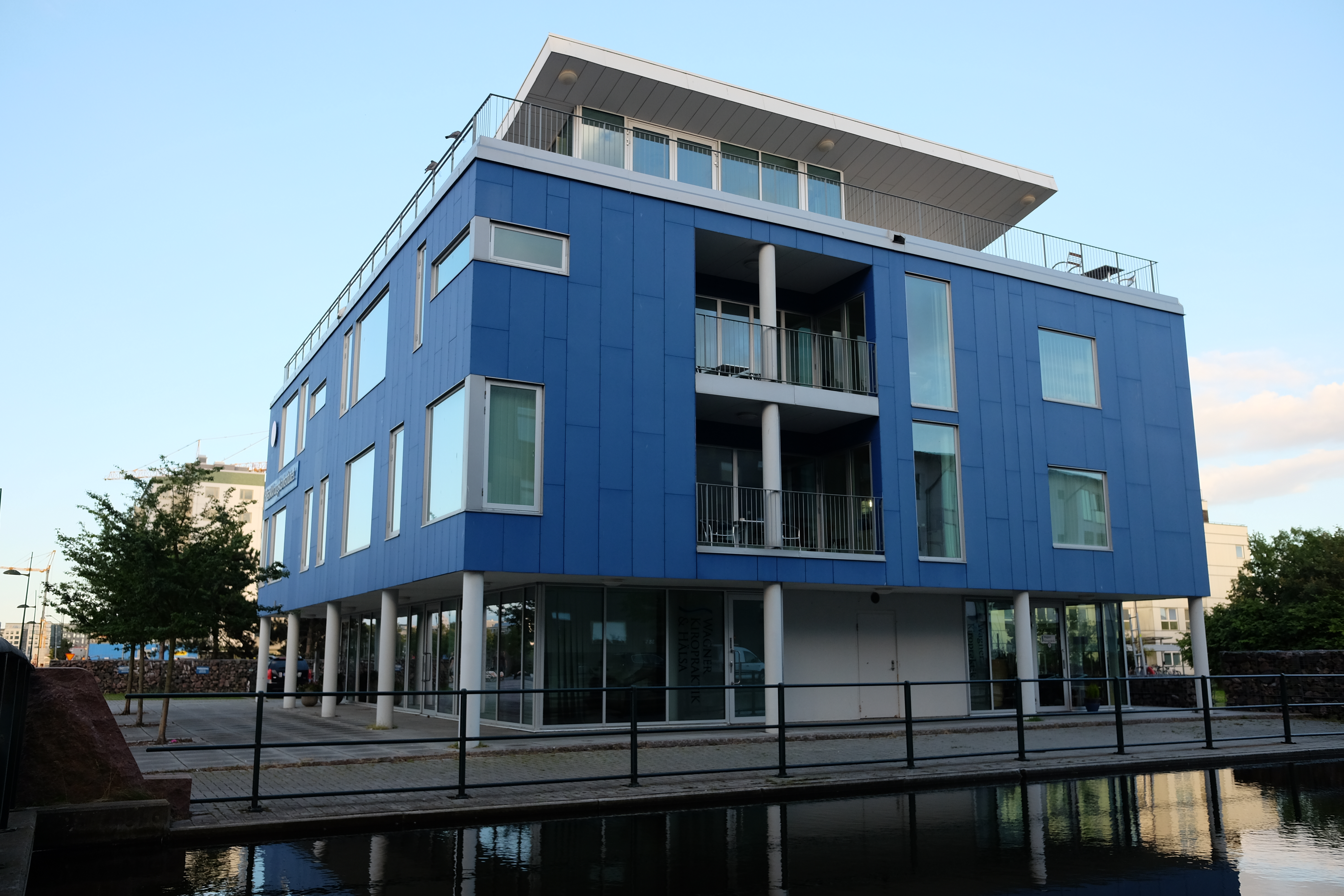

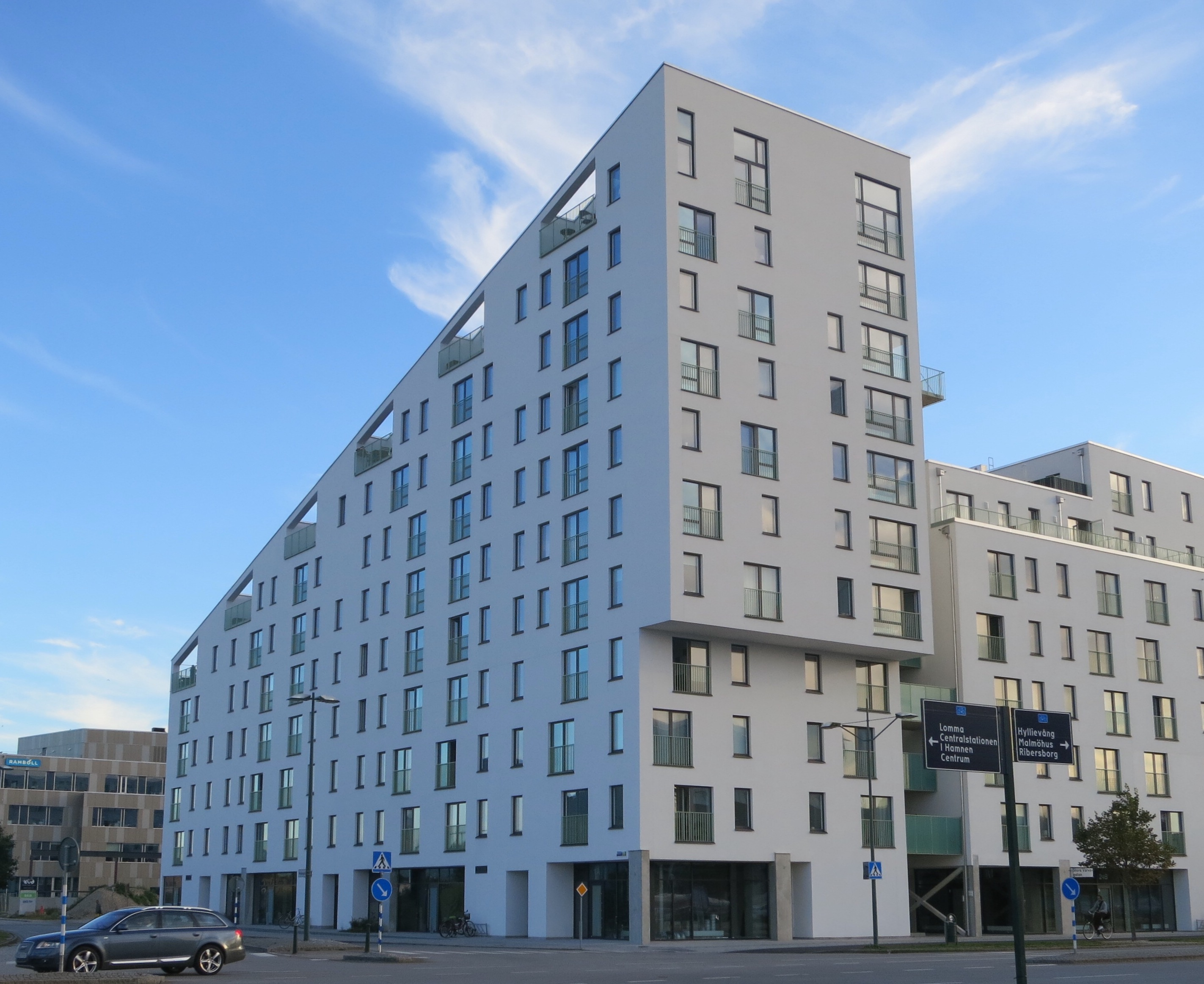

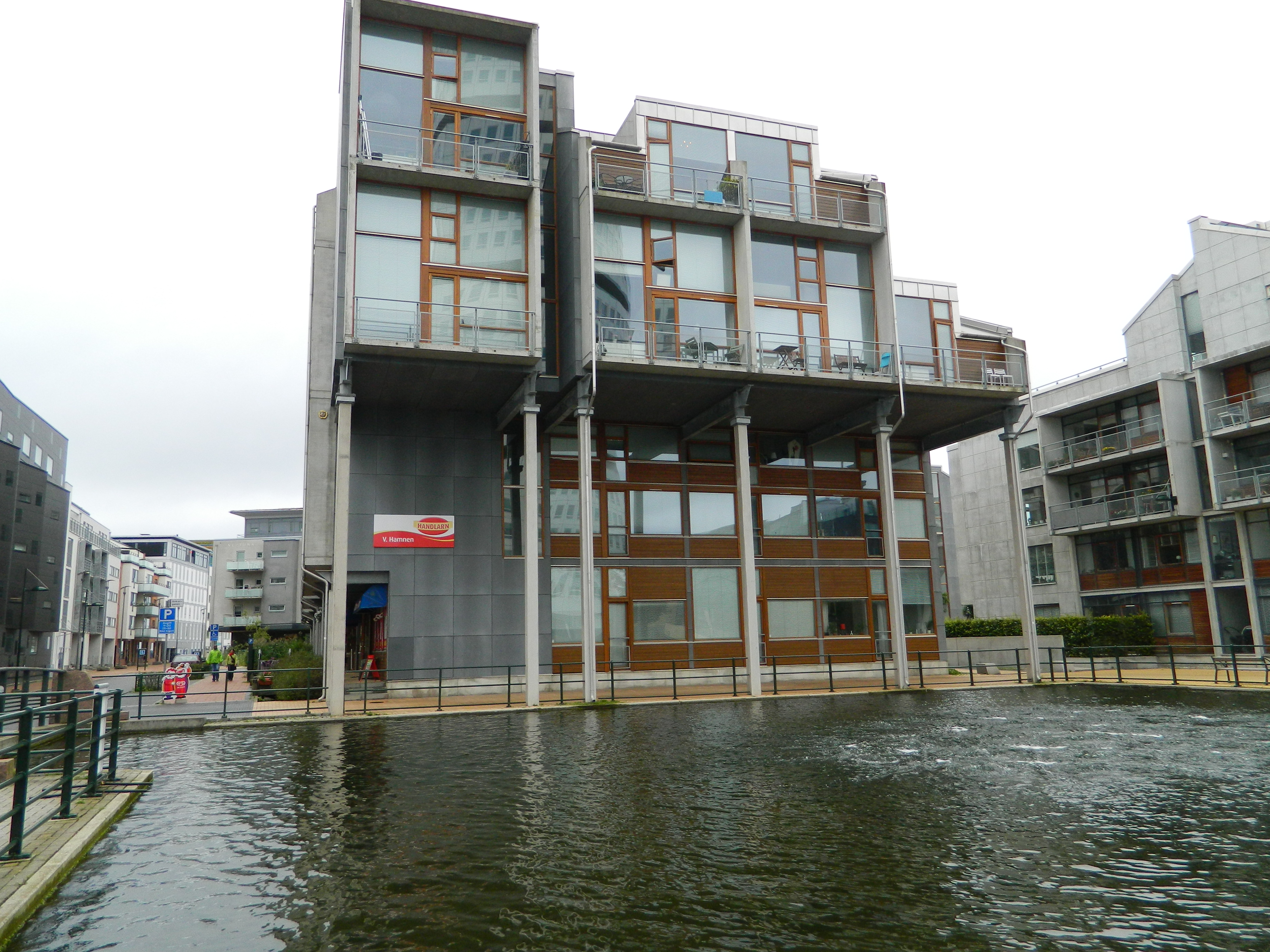

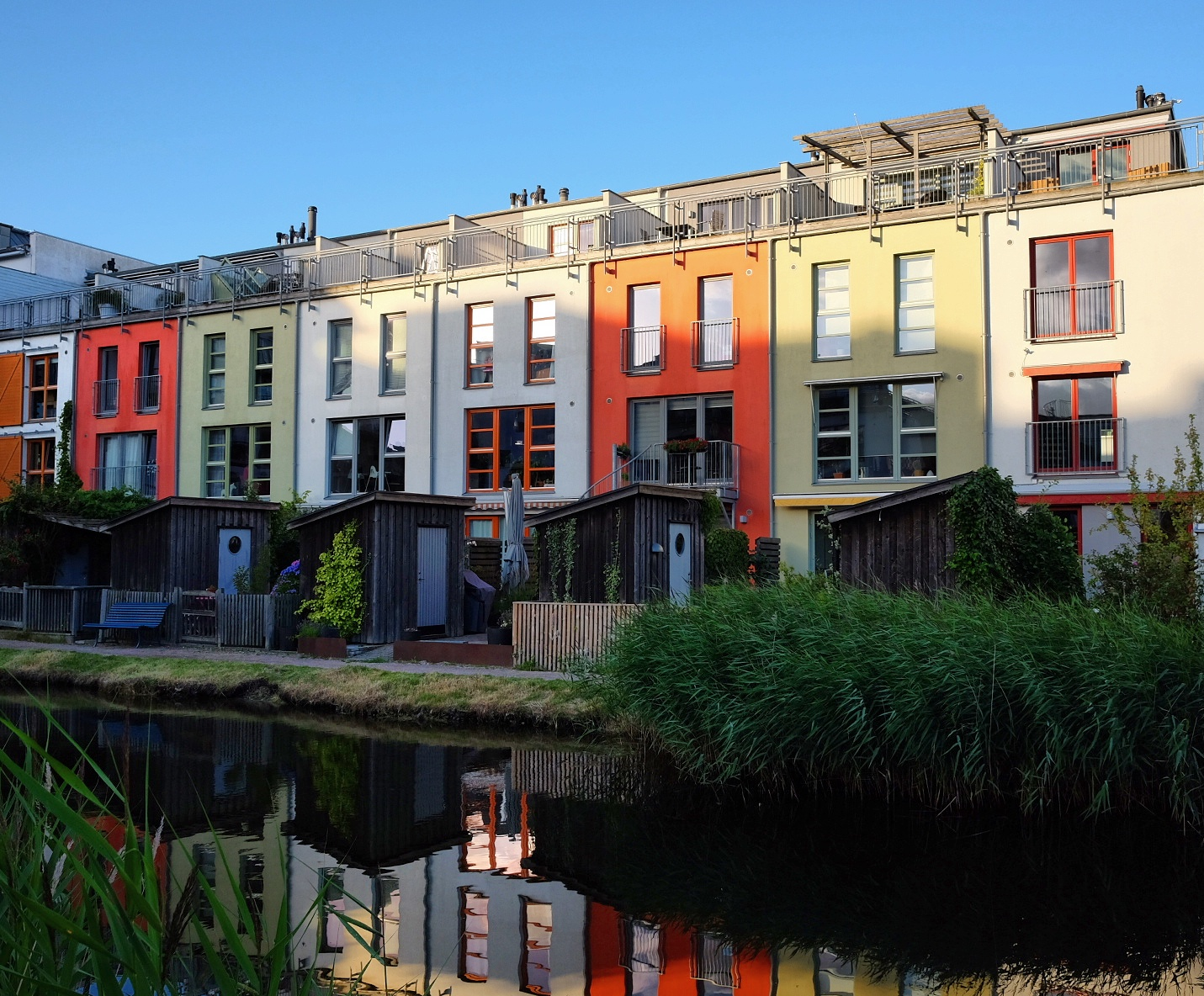

Västra hamnen (Swedish: [ˈvɛ̌sːtra ˈhǎmnɛn], "western harbor") is a neighbourhood of Malmö, situated in the borough of Centrum, Malmö Municipality, Skåne County, Sweden. This sub-area is an artificial island. It is a residential, educational and industrial area in Malmö.

== History ==
The whole area is made up of marine infill north of the original shoreline. Work began in the 1770s at the present Inner Harbor and gradually expanded to the west and north. In the 1870s, Kockums expanded its operations with shipbuilding and moved to the area. During the first half of the 20th century, the oil port was located in the area, but moved to the eastern parts of the harbor around 1945 to make room for the shipyard. In 1966, Kockums constructed the world's largest dock in Västra hamnen. Västra hamnen was an industrial area until the 21st century, when the last factory closed down.

From the 1970s, Kockums' operations declined and the large production hall was converted into a Saab factory in the mid-1980s. However, the factory was short-lived and soon Malmömässan moved into the hall. In 2001, the Bo01 European Housing Exposition was held in Västra Hamnen, marking the start of the new district. Many different architects were involved and created a diversity in architecture that is rarely seen in newly built neighborhoods. A small harbor for pleasure boats was also built. Today it is one of the most exclusive and expensive neighborhood in Malmö.

The main reason why people from Malmö were drawn here was that the promenade and the viewing platform were quickly used as a bathing area. The municipality cleared away dangerous stones in the water and more. In summer, Malmö residents flocked here to swim. The residents along the promenade did not appreciate all the bathers, so in 2005 Scaniabadet was built in Scaniaparken in the northern part of the area.

Since the European Housing Exposition, there has been a flurry of construction activity in the West Harbour. The large Kockums Crane disappeared in 2002, but was replaced as a landmark in 2005 by Sweden's tallest residential building, Turning Torso.

Malmö University (by then a university) has been established on Universitetsholmen, with the Teacher training college's new building, Orkanen at Hjälmarekajen. ProCivitas Private Gymnasium is also located on Universitetsholmen. Around the City Tunnel station is the university's main building, which used to be the harbor office, as well as the Sjömanskyrkan church and the old pilot office at Bagers plats. The Universitetsholmen Upper Secondary School is actually located just west of Universitetsholmen.

In the area closest to Ribersborgsstranden is Kockum Fritid, an indoor facility with an ice rink, swimming pool and training facilities. Skeppets preschool is right next door.

Västra Hamnen is also known as "the City of Tomorrow", and is the first district in Europe that claims to be carbon neutral. The district uses aquifer thermal energy storage system to heat buildings in the winter and cool them in the summer. The city of Malmö received a Special Mention award at the Lee Kuan Yew World City Prize 2012 in recognition of its good work at Västra hamnen.

== Gallery ==
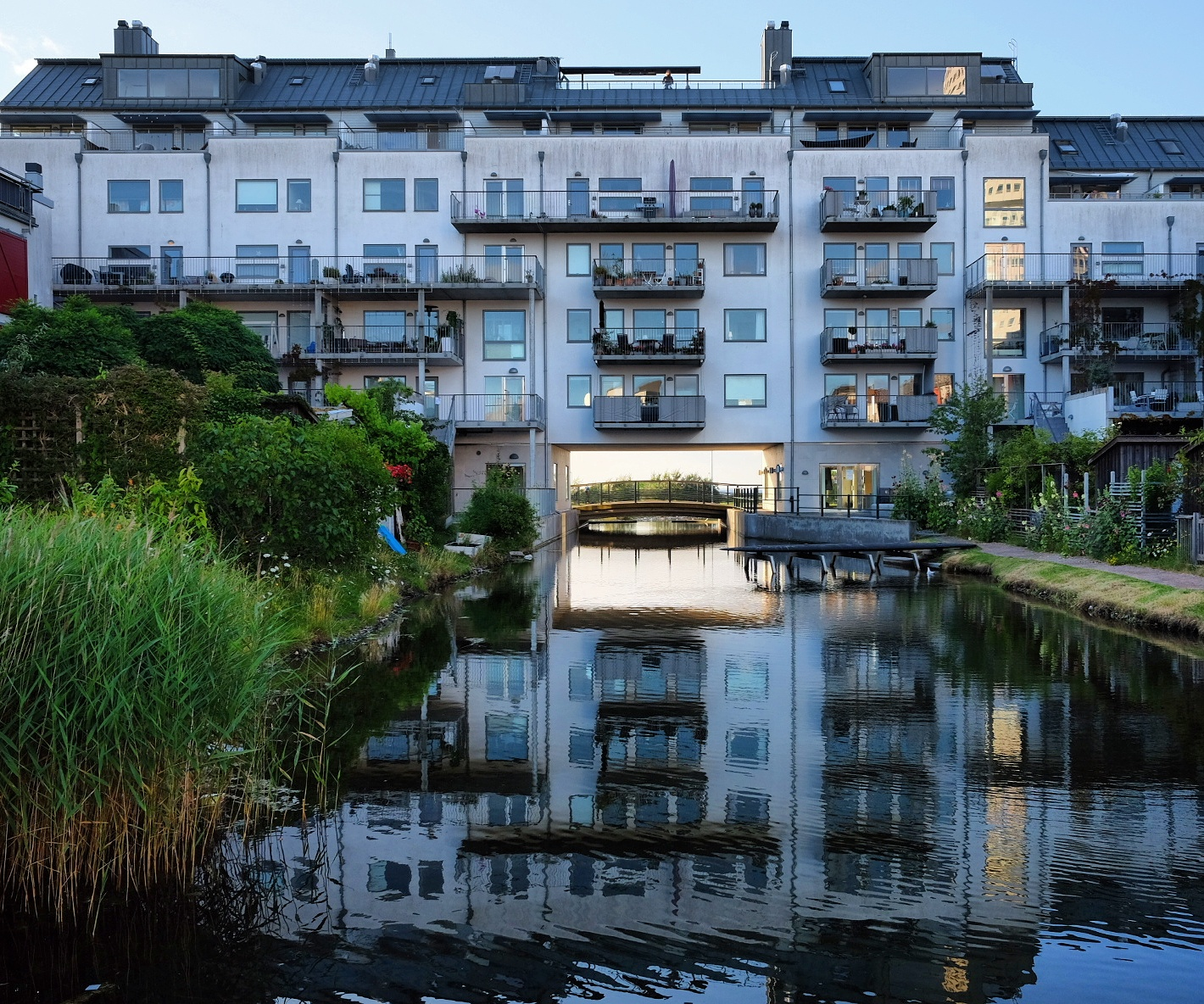

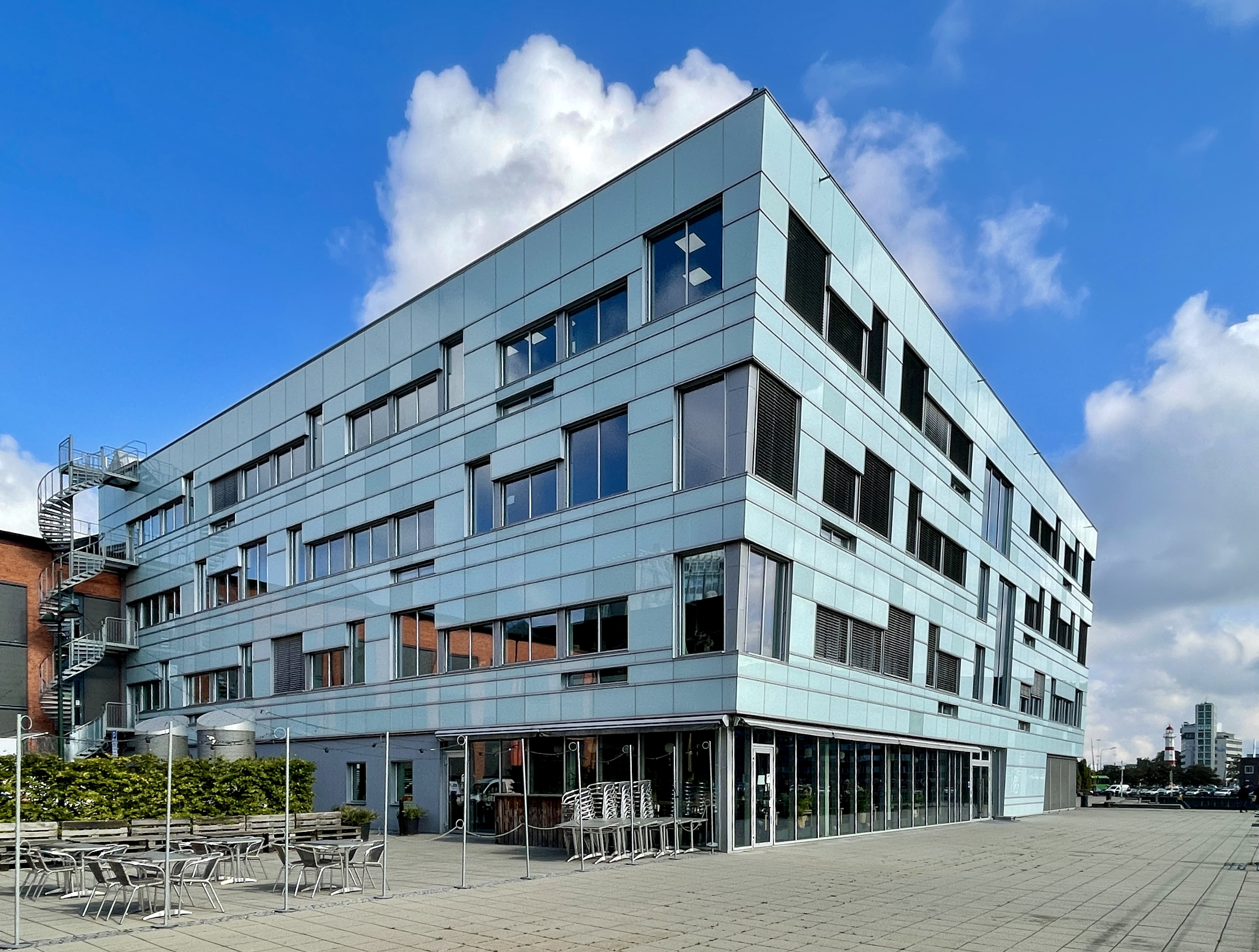

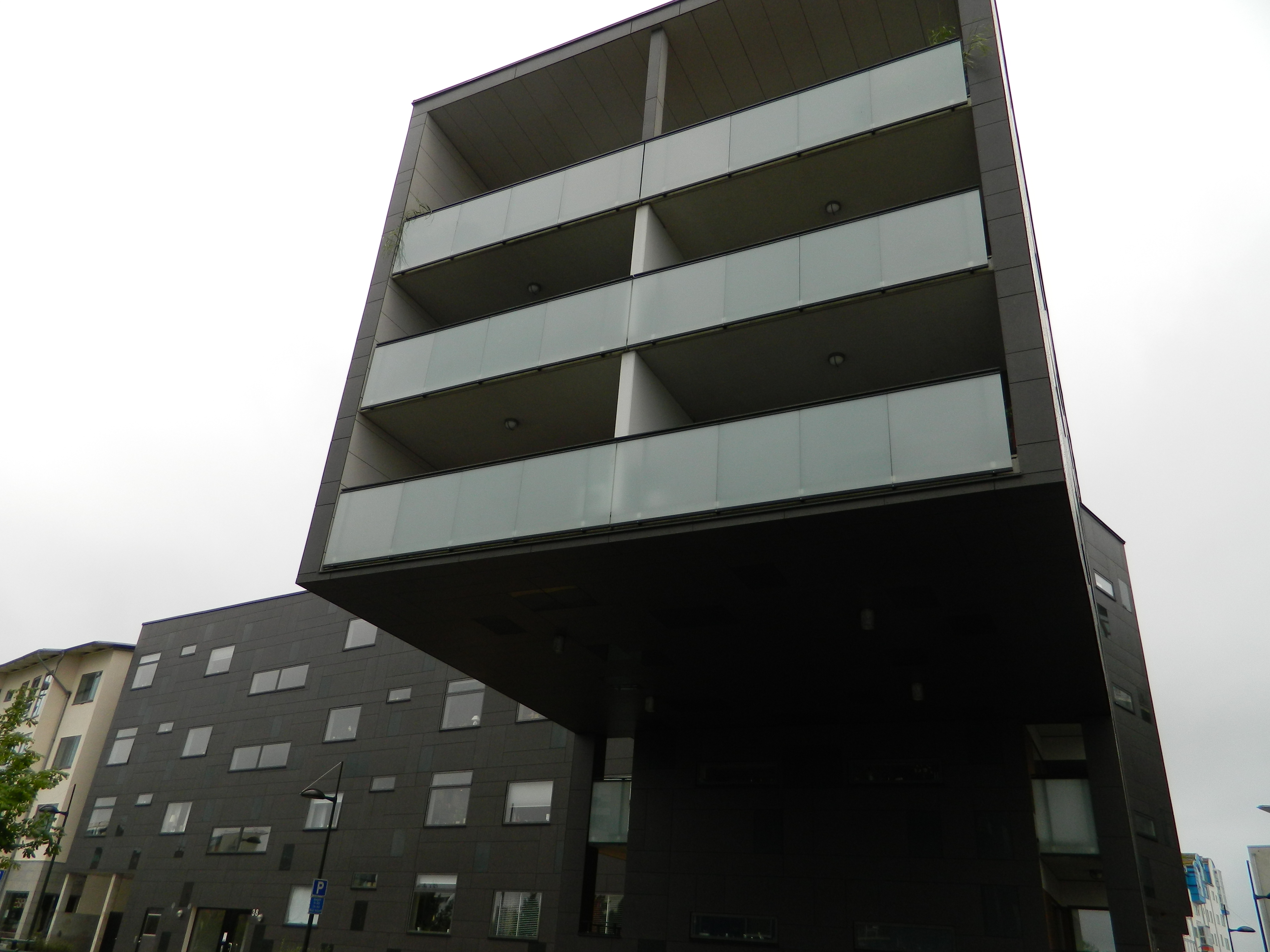

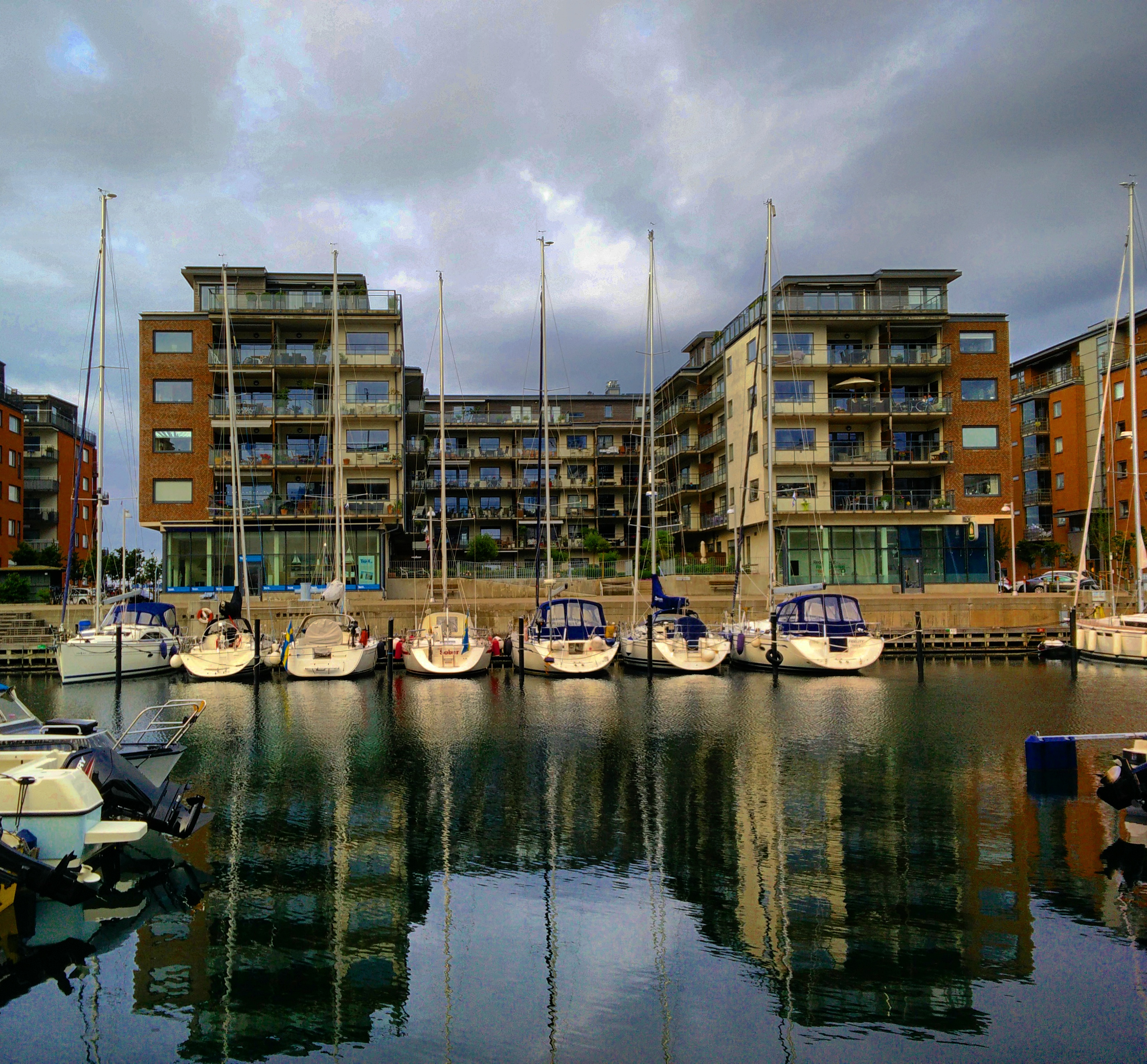
