= Danica (given name) =

Danica (Cyrillic: Даница) is a Slavic feminine given name. The name means "morning star" and originates from the personification of the morning star (Venus) in Slavic mythology.

== Notable people ==
- Danica Baričević (born 1972), Australian-born Croatian politician
- Danica Crnogorčević, singer of ethno and religious songs and a graduate art historian from Montenegro
- Danica Krstajić, tennis player from Montenegro
- Danica, Hereditary Princess of Serbia, Serbian graphic designer and wife of Hereditary Prince Philip
- Danica Mastilović, (1933–2023), Serbian–German operatic soprano
- Danica McKellar, American actress and mathematician, best known for her role as Winnie Cooper on the TV show The Wonder Years
- Danica Milosavljevic (1925–2018), Serbian combat fighter for the Partisan forces in Yugoslavia's National Liberation War
- Danica Krstić, Serbian singer
- Danica Patrick, American race car driver
- Danica Rice, Canadian sprint kayaker
- Danica Roem, American politician and journalist
- Danica Seleskovitch (1921–2001), French conference interpreter, teacher and academic writer
- Danica Taylor (born 2001), English television personality
- Danica Thrall, English glamour model and reality television personality
- Danica Wu, Canadian soccer player
- Elvira Dolinar (pen name Danica, 1870–1961), Slovenian feminist writer

== Fictional ==
- Danica Maupoissant, from the Forgotten Realms fictional world of Dungeons and Dragons
- Danica Shardae, the protagonist and narrator of Amelia Atwater-Rhodes's fantasy novel Hawksong
- Danica Talos, a vampire character from the 2004 film Blade: Trinity
- Danica, the head housemaid of the Snezhnayan royal house from the game Genshin Impact

== See also ==
- Danika (disambiguation)
