= Bo01 =

Neighbourhood in Malmö, Skåne County, Sweden

- Neighbourhood
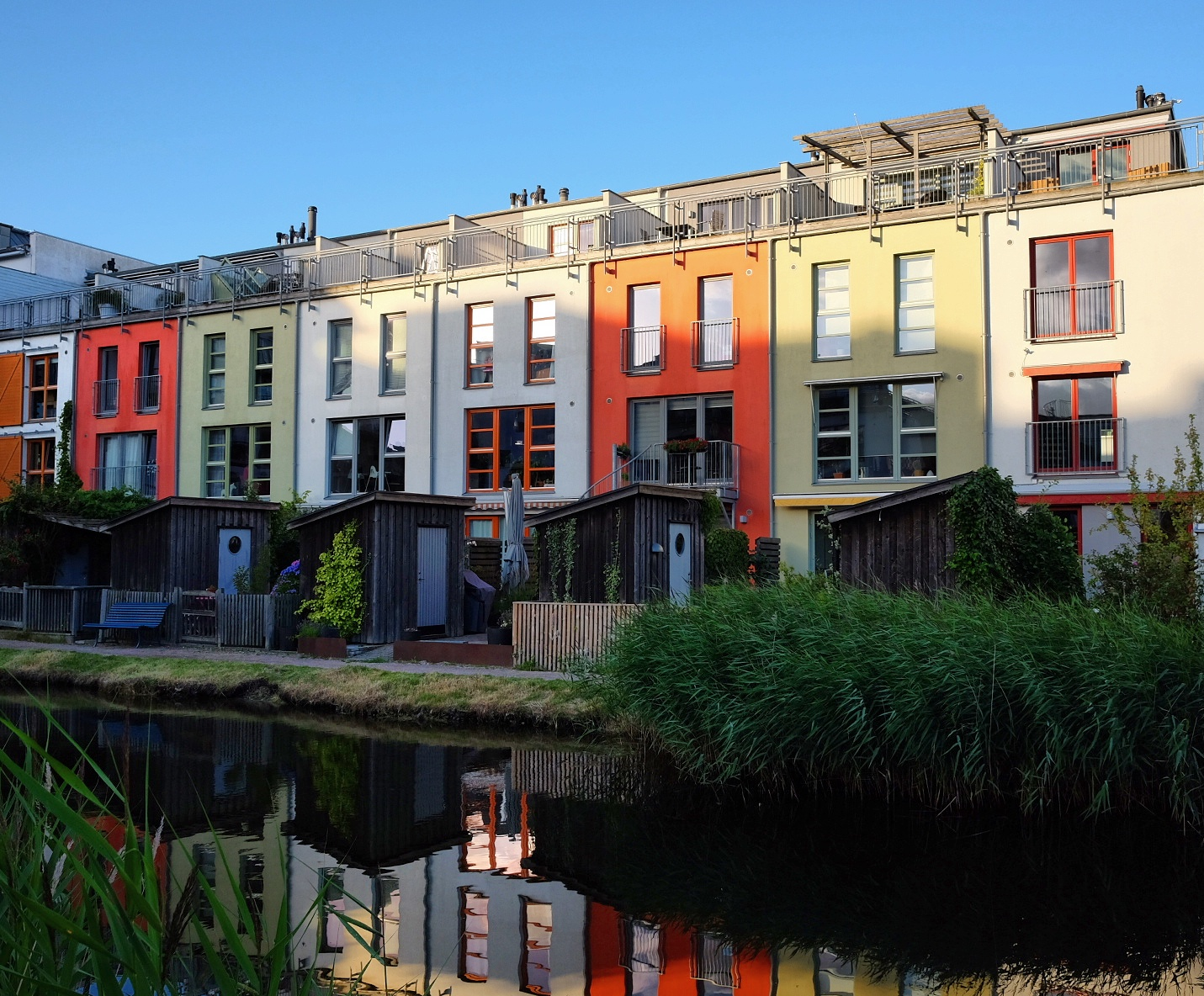
- Residential housing in Bo01
- Nickname: City of Tomorrow
- Interactive map of Bo01
- Coordinates: 55°36′21.13″N 13°0′2.63″E
- Country: Sweden
- Province: Skåne
- County: Skåne County
- Municipality: Malmö Municipality
- Borough of Malmö: Centrum
- Opened: 2001
- Time zone: UTC+1 (CET)

Bo01 (pronounced "bo-noll-ett"; also known as the "City of Tomorrow") is a neighbourhood in the southern city of Malmö, Sweden, known for its sustainable development and design. Bo01 began as part of the European Housing Exposition in 2001 and served as a prototype to help later design Västra hamnen. Today, Bo01 is known for its holistic approach to incorporate sustainable design into high-quality living and serves as one of the first Swedish models for sustainable urban planning.

Designed by an urban designer, Klas Tham, Bo01 is the first neighbourhood in the world to declare that 100% of its energy is sourced entirely from renewable sources. The name Bo01 stems from the Swedish verb "bo" meaning "to dwell," and 01, short for 2001. The most notable building built for Bo01 was the Turning Torso skyscraper, which became the tallest residential building in Scandinavia at the time. It was however not completed in time for the start of the housing exposition, and was completed later in 2005.

== History ==
The Western Harbour in Malmö had long been the host for the Kockums shipbuilding industry since the late 19th century. At the time, the City of Malmö was considered a highly successful leader as an industrial city. However, following the decline of the company and an economic recession in the 1970s, the population of Malmö diminished, and the area was left largely abandoned. A SAAB factory was later founded in the 1990s, however this was soon closed down and the land was sold back to the city in 1996. In response to the economic crisis the Western Harbor was experiencing, the City of Malmö was in need of identifying a strong development plan for the future of the city.

As Malmö began to recognize the start of an economic crisis, the city saw a change in political power, gaining a larger focus of sustainability issues and was also experiencing several environmental disasters. The City of Malmö saw this as an opportunity to use the existing industrial land and convert it into a city of knowledge by developing the Harbor area into a “modern eco city” as a response to the economic crisis. To this end, a European Housing Exposition in Malmö was planned for 2000, however following the council's acquisition of the Western Harbor, it was decided that this former industrial area would be a more suitable location. Therefore, the exposition was moved to the Western Harbor and chose Bo01 as the first project in the exposition.

=== Design, Planning and Construction ===
The design of Bo01 was the first step in turning Västra Hamnen into a mixed-use development. The intent of the project was to design a neighborhood to bring a new image for the city by showcasing sustainable design strategies that can be shared with the public. The City of Malmö also saw this exposition as an opportunity to bolster the image of the city after the economic crisis and as a marketing tactic to attract new attention to the city.

A group of 16 developers from around the world worked on the project and appointed the lead designer and architect as Professor Klas Tham, alongside the City of Malmö Planning Office. The planning process included the Quality Programme as a tool to set the standards and guidelines for a successful sustainable design. A master design plan was developed in 1999 for Bo01, the same year that a 250 million Swedish kronor grant was awarded to the project by the Swedish government, part of Sweden's Local Investment Program. Other funding for the project was provided by the European Union to support the renewable energy technology for the project.

Construction began in 2000 and the housing exposition opened in May 2001 lasting 5 months. The original design planned for 350 residential units, but after being fully developed, it included around 1,800 residential spaces. The neighborhood also included commercial buildings, service spaces, educational buildings and plenty of recreational spaces.

== Ecological sustainability ==
Bo01s strong environmental profile is evident in many of the districts features.

=== Energy and renewable resources ===
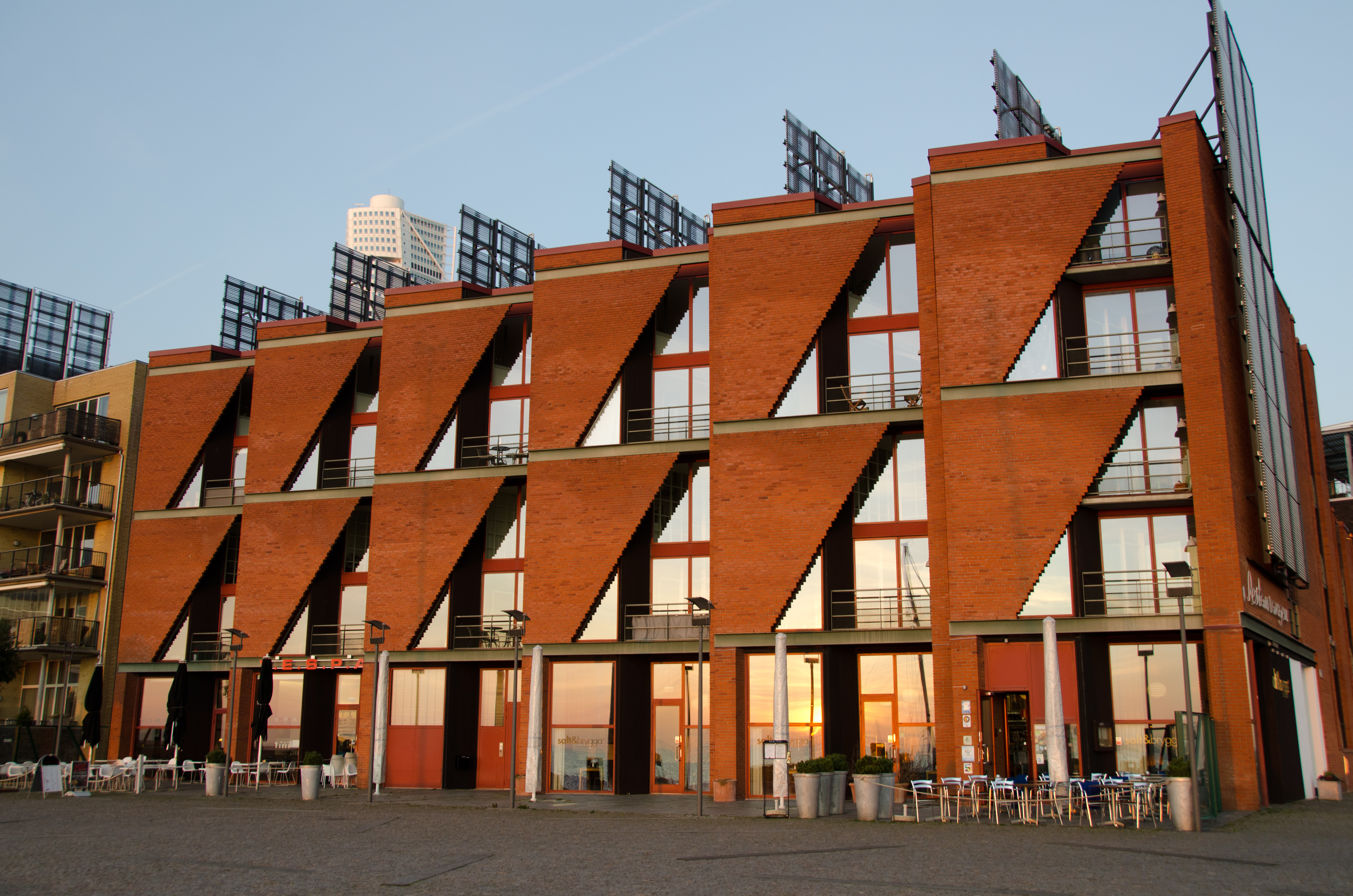
Solar Collectors on the Tegelborg-building

The original plan for Bo01 envisioned a city functioning off 100% renewables sources as a self-sufficient neighborhood, provided entirely by Sydkraft AB. The goal of Bo01 was to reveal what is achievable when setting high energy efficiency standards through renewable sources, rather than highly-energy efficient buildings. During the design phase, an average energy use goal was established, one of few quantitative goals for the neighborhood, of 33.3 kBTU per square foot of floor area per year, which is 40% of the average energy use in Sweden. In the design phase, modeling software was used to model the performance of different design elements until the energy use calculations in the modeling software matched the energy use design requirements Bo01 had set. During operation however, Bo01 eventually failed to meet this target.

The energy system in Bo01 includes sustainable features such as wind power, district heating, solar panels, and heat pumps. Photovoltaic solar panels are present on every home and are the primary electricity source for dwelling spaces. During the operational phase, Bo01 uses software to monitor the usage of the photovoltaic solar panels to understand the performance and detect any faults in the system. The largest energy demand in Bo01 is heating and cooling, which is supplied by the district heating system supplemented by solar thermal collector and geothermal technology. Other renewable electricity is provided by the districts own wind turbine Boel situated in Norra Hamnen.

A unique design aspect of the Bo01 grid design is its relationship with the electric grid feeding the rest of Malmö. When there is a decrease in energy demand in Bo01, the excess energy is fed into the grid to other parts of Malmö. When the electricity consumption in Bo01 is more than what the local grid can provide, Bo01 can receive energy from the systems providing power to the rest of the city.

=== Green space ===
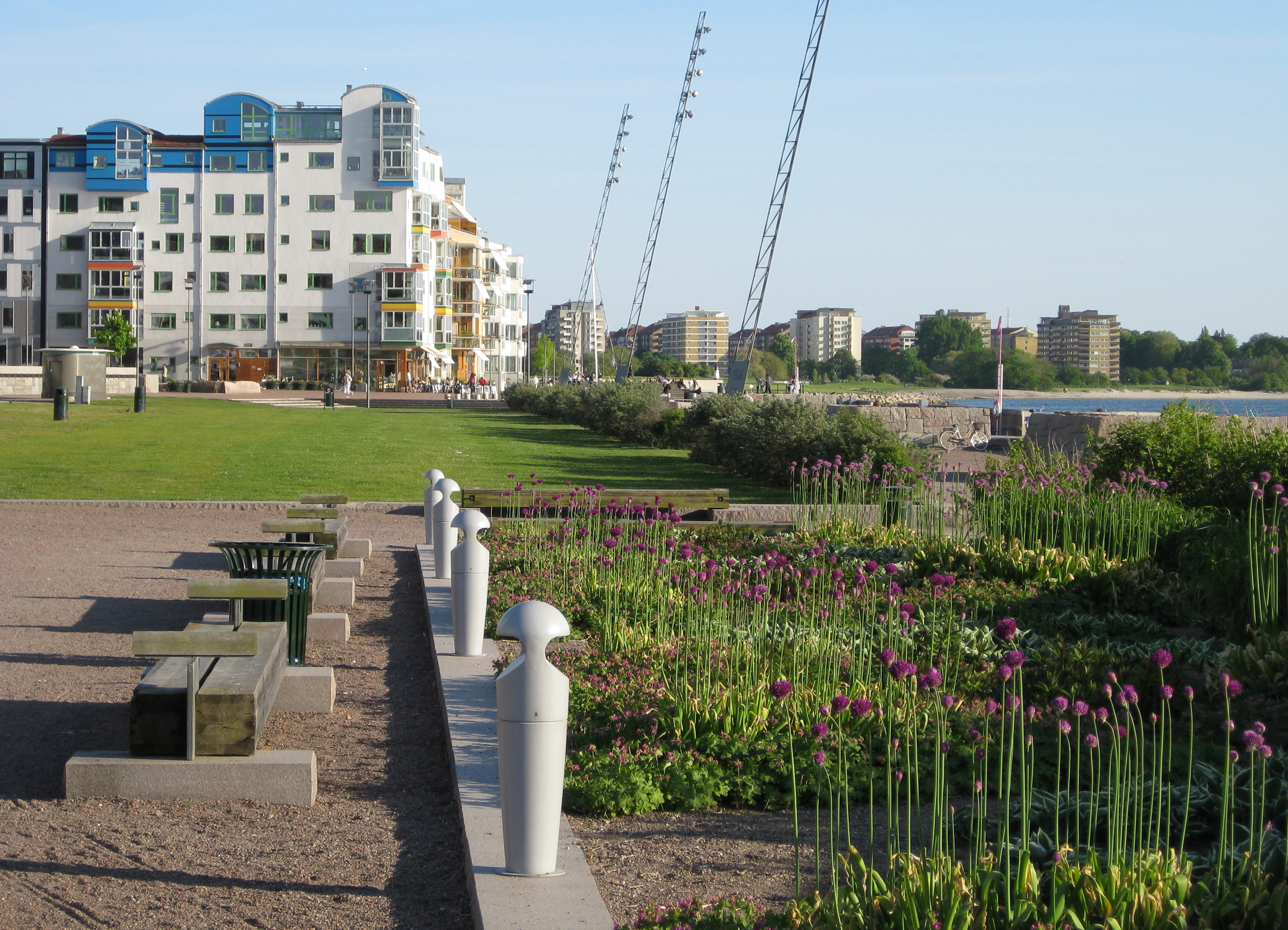
Daniaparken, Malmö

Bo01 was designed by a group of developers who collectively prioritized green space in Bo01 in their original design. To ensure that green space was included, the team took two approaches. The first was the Green Points list, developed by Bo01 in conjunction with the City of Malmö. The developers of Bo01 agreed to choose from ten of the thirty-five green point options on this list to incorporate in the design of Bo01. The second was to satisfy the “green space factor,” originally designed by the City of Berlin. This green space factor calls for a certain percent of each surface within a development to be permeable. In respect to Bo01, this value was 0.5 or greater. The green space factor stimulated the design approach and help spark innovation when designing all surfaces in Bo01.

The design of Bo01 also includes many green spaces that are close to residential spaces, schools, and along pedestrian paths.

=== Sustainable transportation ===
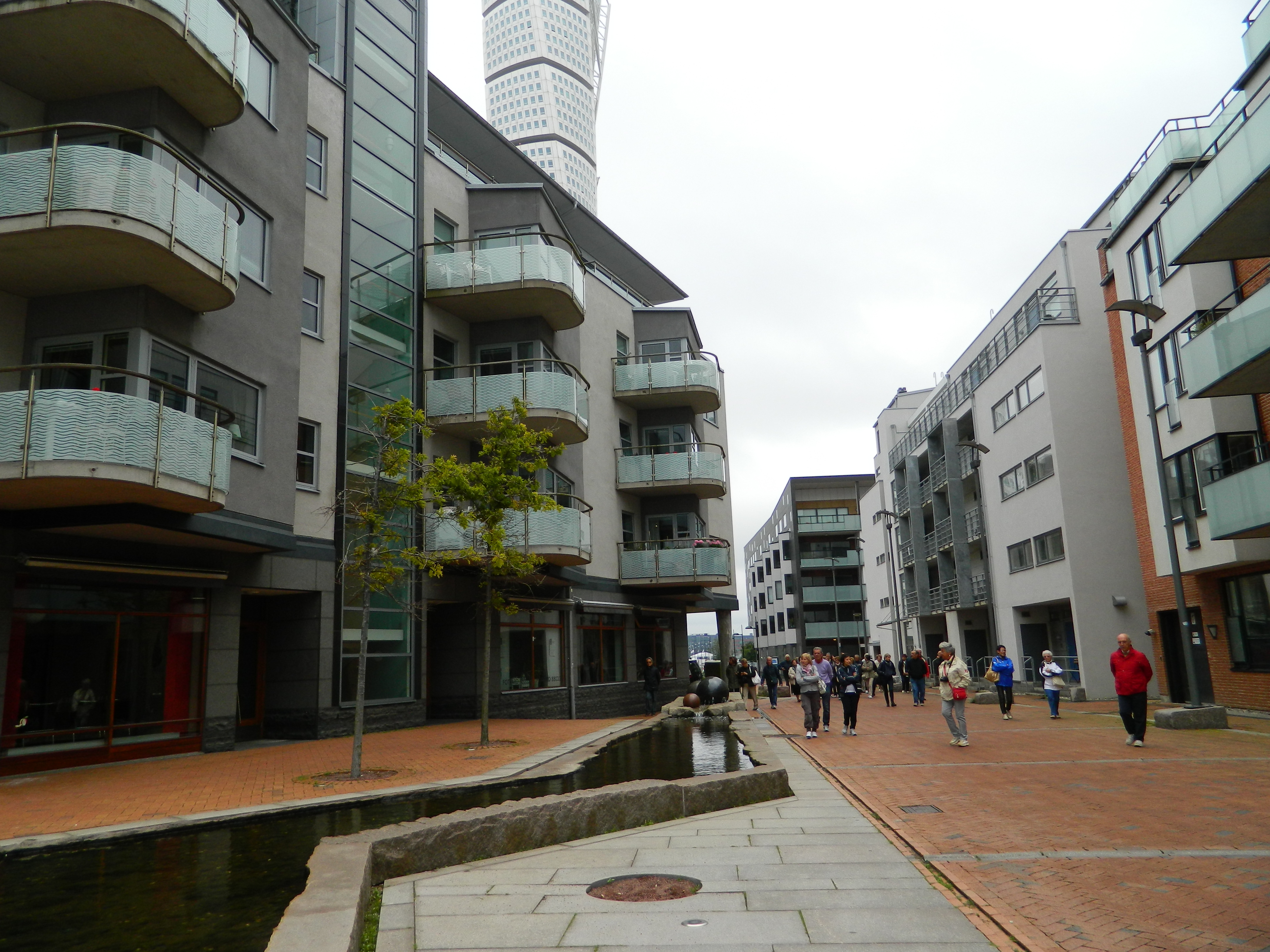
Pedestrians walking in Bo01

The initial design goal was to reduce the reliance on personal vehicle use. To do this, Bo01 incorporated sustainable transportation design to encourage the use of walking, cycling, green vehicles and car sharing. The neighborhood design also included many services and activities for the residents to reduce the amount of travel outside of Bo01.

Bike paths are an integral part of the neighborhood that connect the neighborhood to the rest of the city. Bo01 has also focused on improving the pedestrian walking experience by directing the paths in unique ways to create shortcuts with several routes to make the walking experience more inviting. The neighborhood does not have any roads for vehicles, so pedestrians can feel safe walking through the neighborhood and are also given priority with bikes over cars. The Bo01 bus system has also been a key design factor in Bo01 since the original design. Every resident of Bo01 is also within 1,500 feet of a bus stop and are scheduled every seven minutes. The design of the bus system in provides easy access to the rest of the city and each vehicle runs on sustainable sources. For residents that drive, Bo01 provides charging stations to support the use of green vehicles. Priority parking is also provided for those that drive a green vehicle.

=== Stormwater management ===
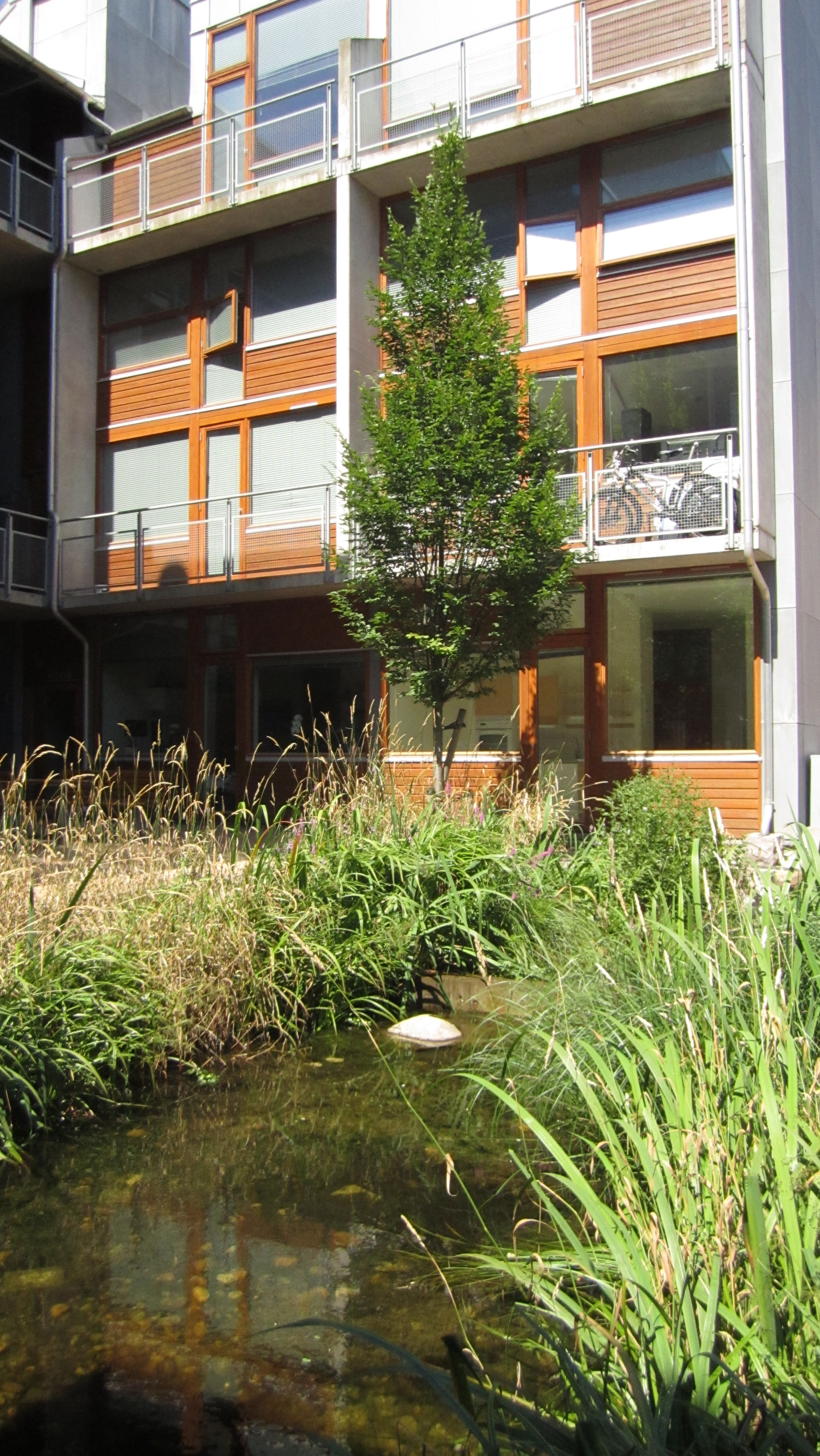
Rain Garden

Water drainage in this highly dense residential area of Bo01 is a key issue to stormwater management. To minimize stormwater run-off in Bo01, the neighborhood utilizes rain gardens, small ponds and canals throughout the neighborhood as a strategy to blend in stormwater management strategies with the existing infrastructure. Green roofs and infiltration through pervious concrete are also strategies used to reduce stormwater runoff. The stormwater that is gathered from any drains or downspouts is directed to either the eastern or western edge of the neighborhood depending on the location if its source, to either the Oresund Strait, or a saltwater canal. The design of the stormwater management system in Bo01 is not hidden from the public and is visible for all residents with the intent of sharing these sustainable practices. Since the design of Bo01 does not prioritize parking spaces and roads for vehicle travel, the stormwater runoff in Bo01 is much less contaminated to begin with for a highly dense, mixed-use area.

== Urban design ==
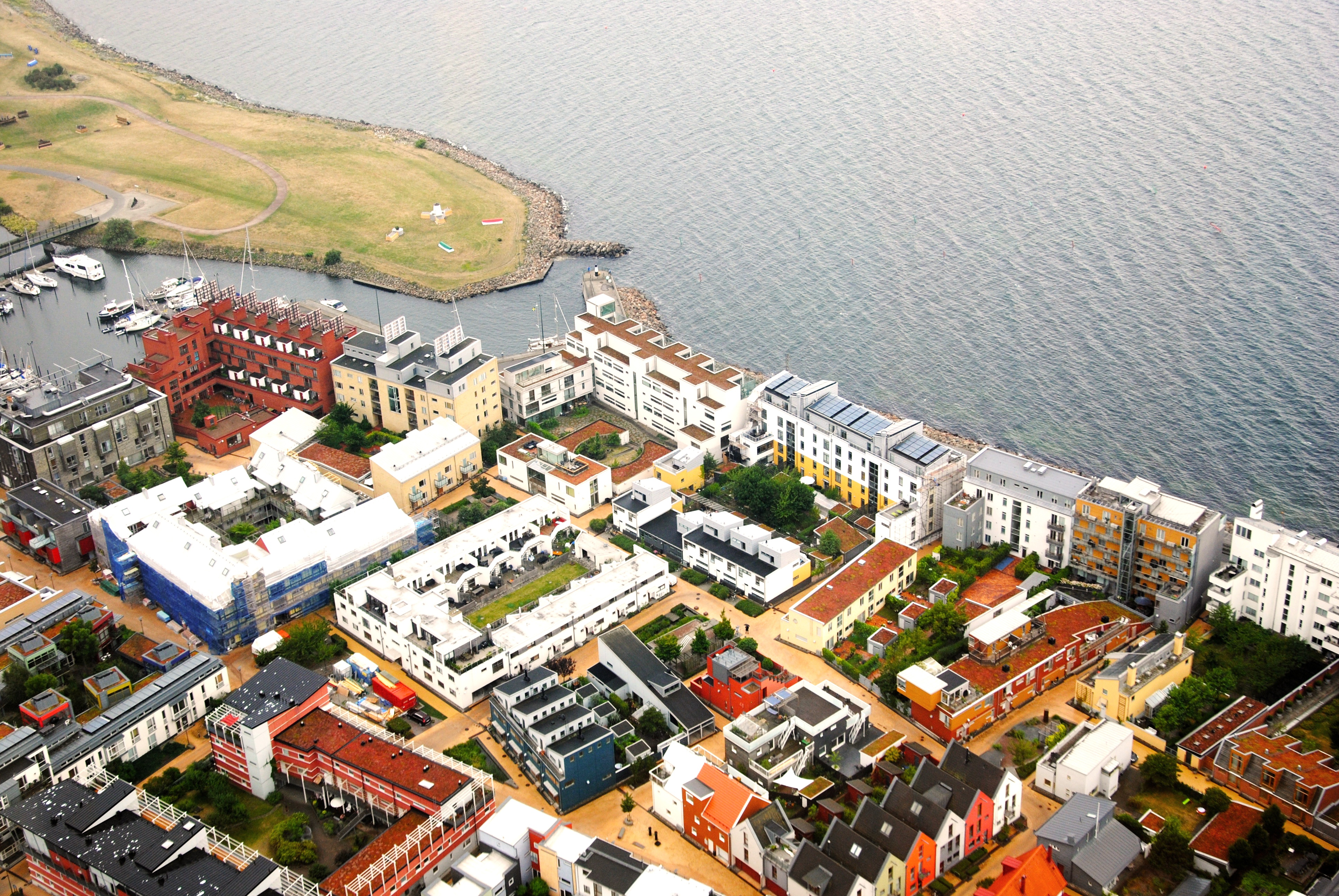
View of Bo01 from the Turning Torso

Head architect Klas Tham envisioned a neighborhood where residents would not only live in sustainable buildings, but also live sustainably within the built environment. The residents were the main focus and the design relied heavily on the expression and diversity of its designers. Bo01 was designed by a group of architects, who each lead the design of a section of Bo01. It highlighted the creativity from this group of architects, where each were given the freedom to design their section of the neighborhood on their own standards. The approach to Bo01 also followed the research from European cities and towns, and Klas Tham had a holistic, and heavy design focus on sustainability for Bo01. He said,

“The urgent conversion of society to long term sustainability will only be possible when the sustainable alternative is regarded not only as the wisest, but also as the most attractive one…The prevailing quantitative standards for environmental sustainability, such as saving energy are necessary, but insufficient…It will not be until people’s aesthetic, emotional and social needs are also met that the sustainable society can be attained."

Klas Tham envisioned a network of streets with a broken-up character, much like that of the inner-city of medieval towns. Inspiration also stemmed from the Middle Ages, the Renaissance, and the Baroque period. This was to have a dual purpose, partly it would break up the urban environment allowing for a more pleasant experience, partly it was to break up the harsh sea winds. He also integrated a collection of surprises and hidden views, with each twist and turn of a road. The urban design of Bo01 fosters a deep connection between the nature and beauty of the neighborhood and its visitors. The design of Bo01 also encourages a human connection with the nature, including a connection with local design features like the waterfront and the green public spaces, as well as a deeper connection with the larger City of Malmö such as the views of the Öresund bridge and the sunsets.

== Gallery ==
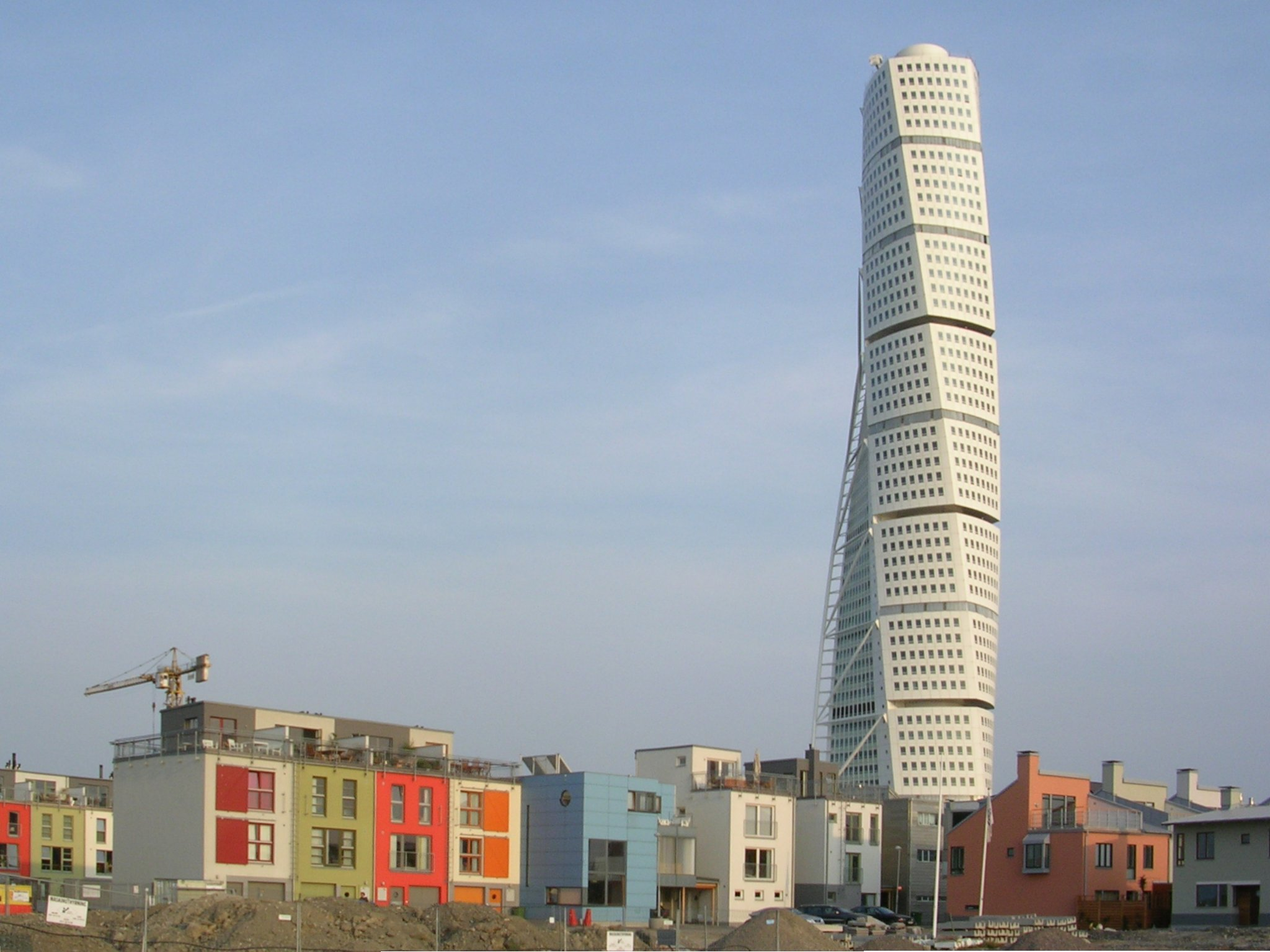
Turning Torso in the background

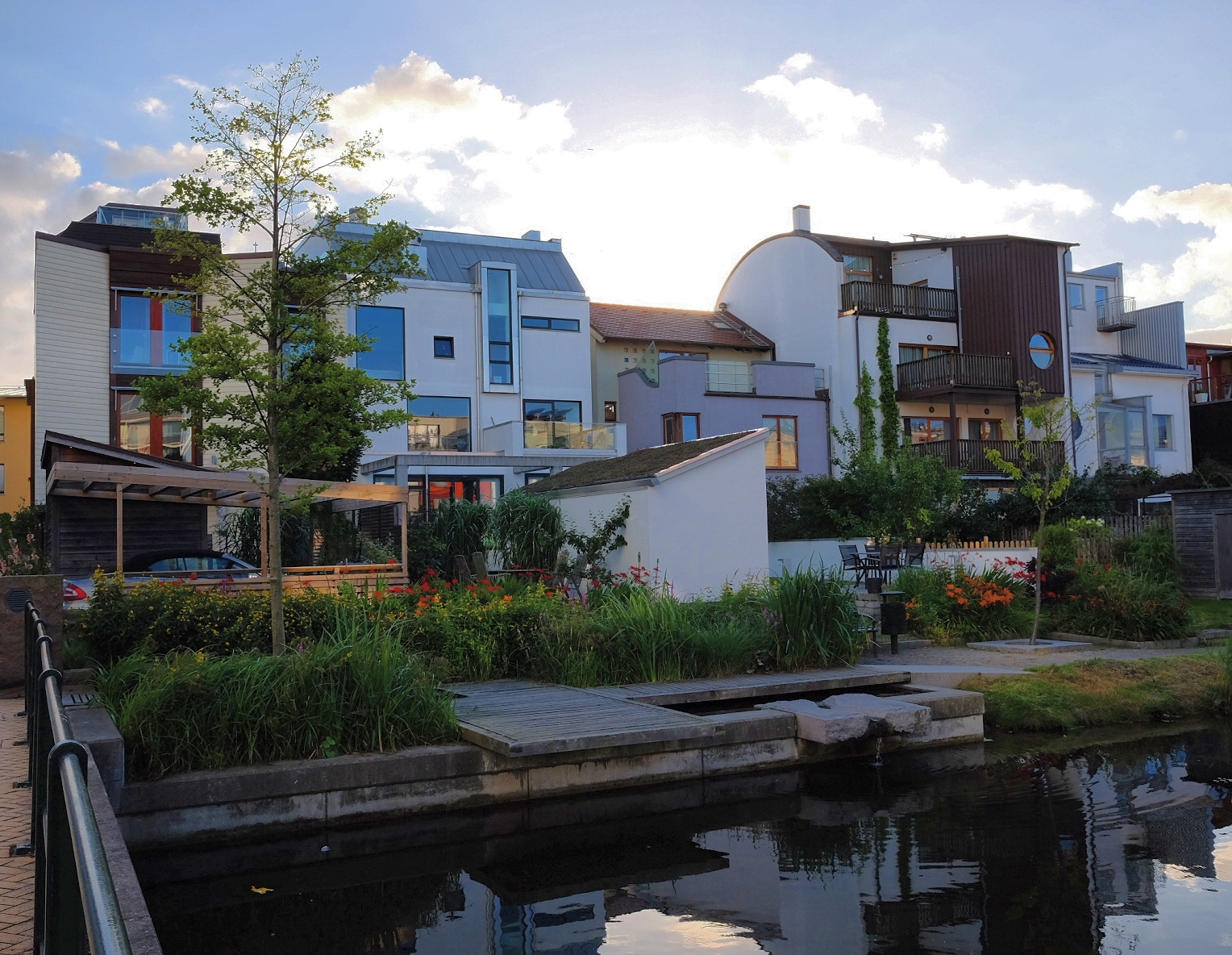
Canals behind residential buildings

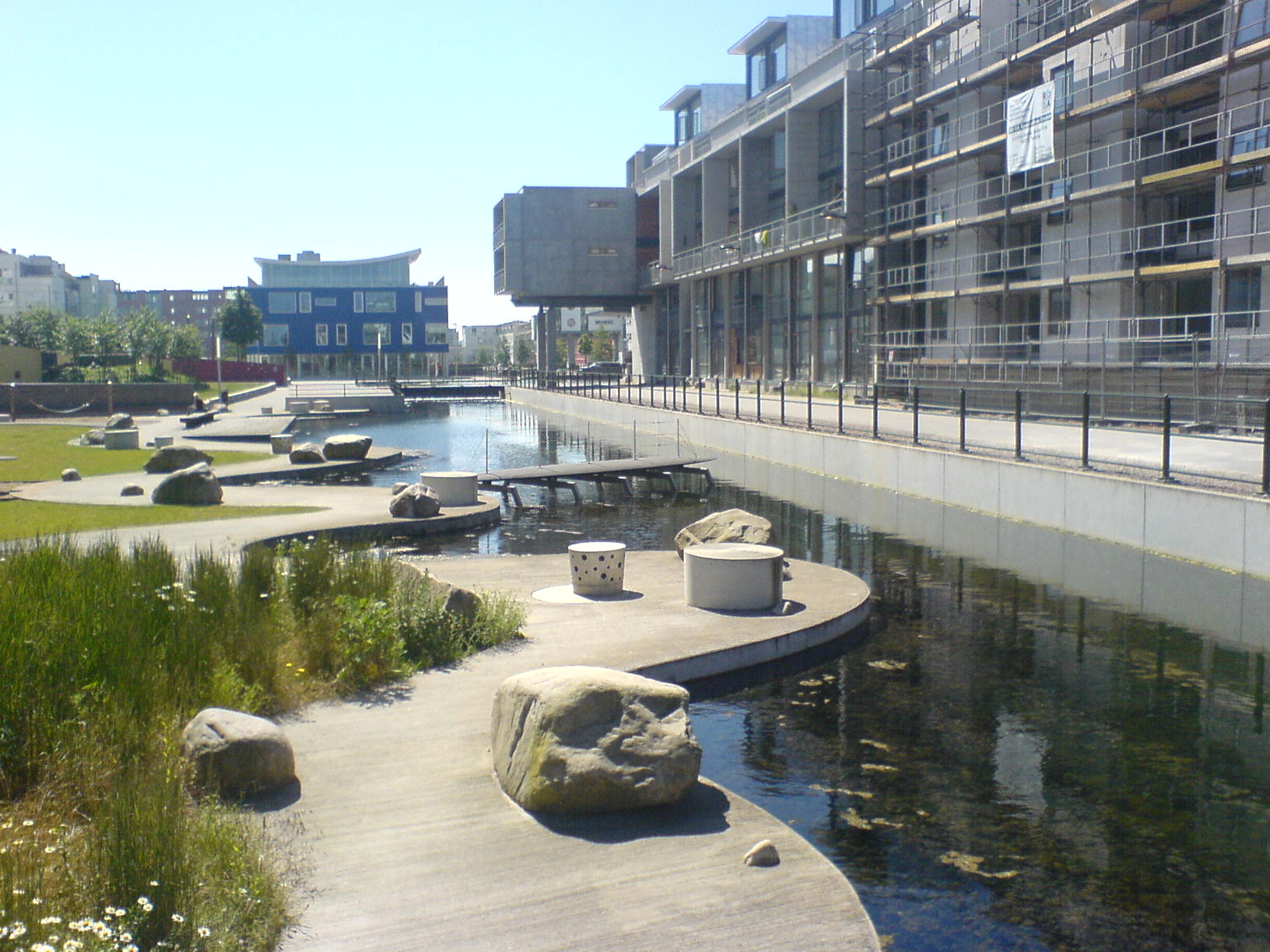
A canal running through Bo01

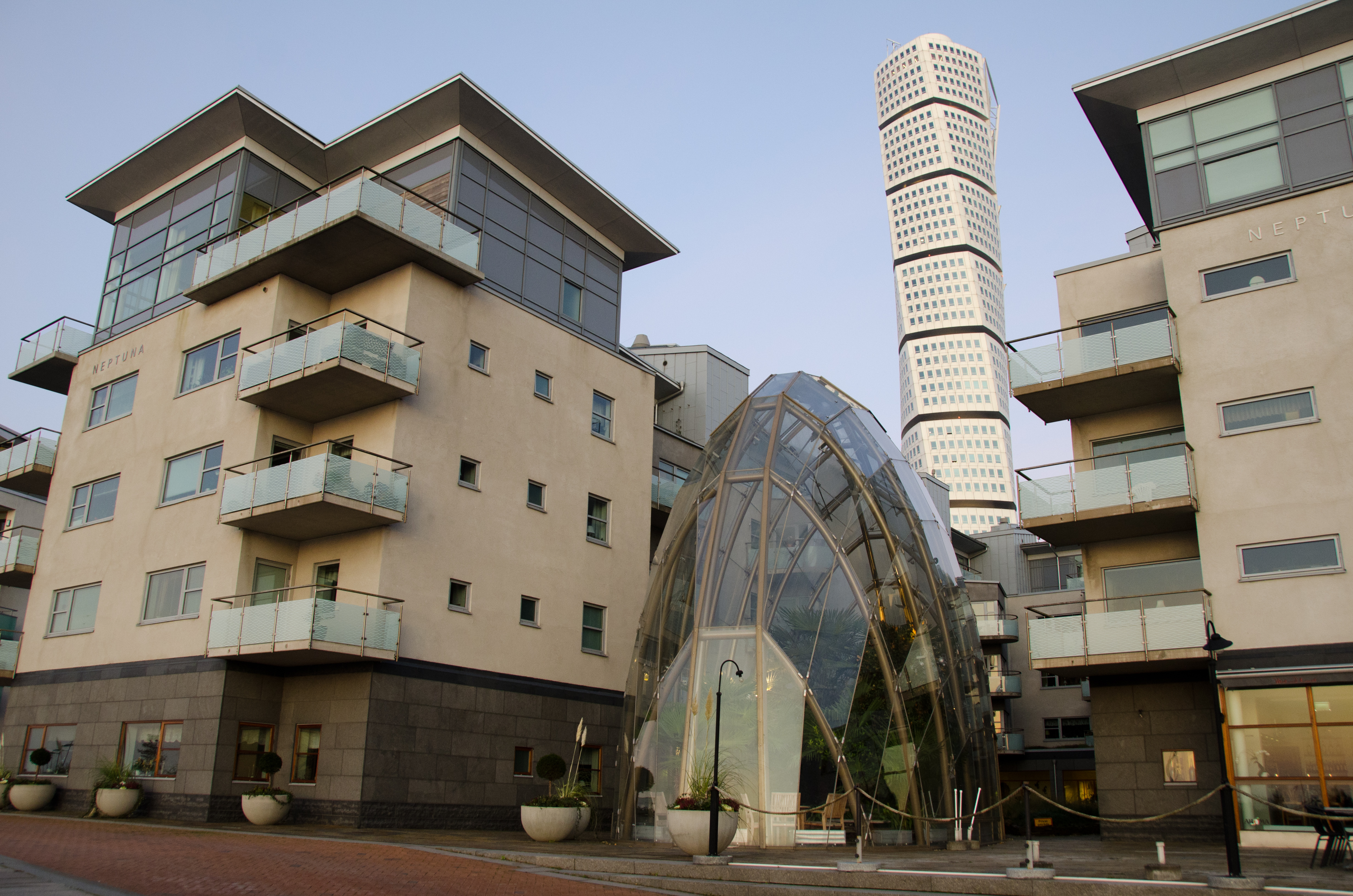
Architecture in Bo01

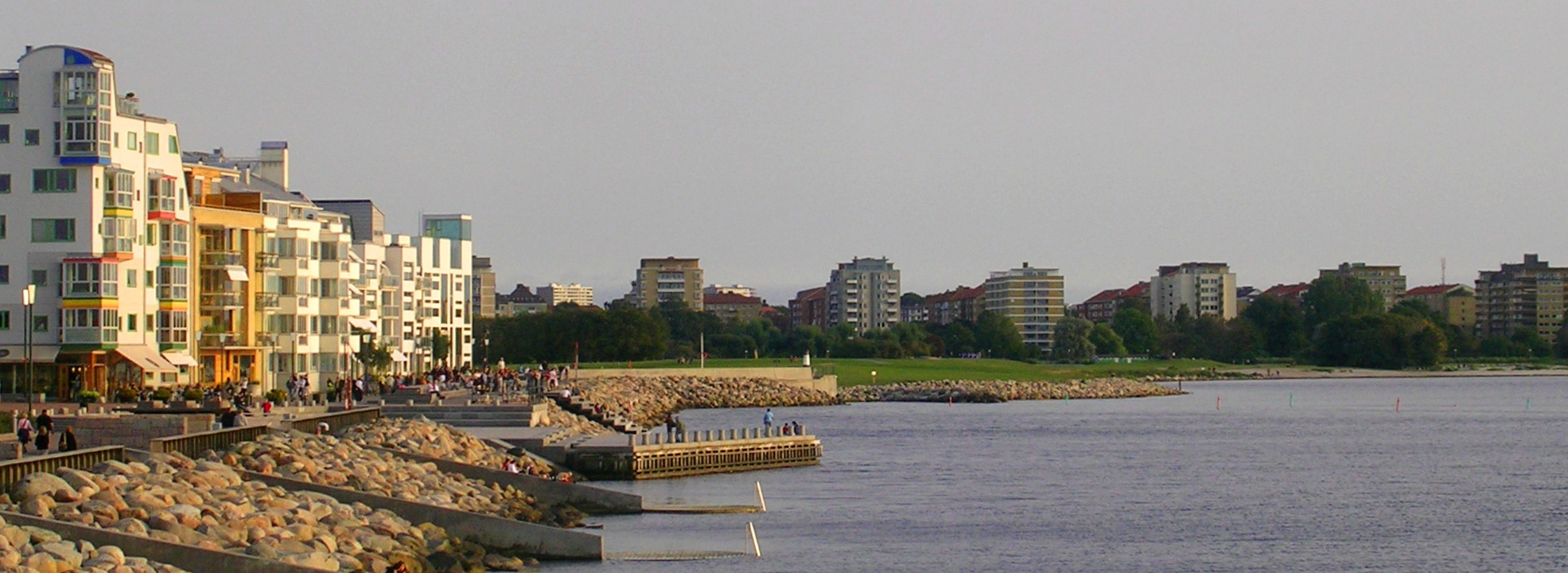
Bo01 waterfront
