= Malmömässan =

Convention centre in Sweden

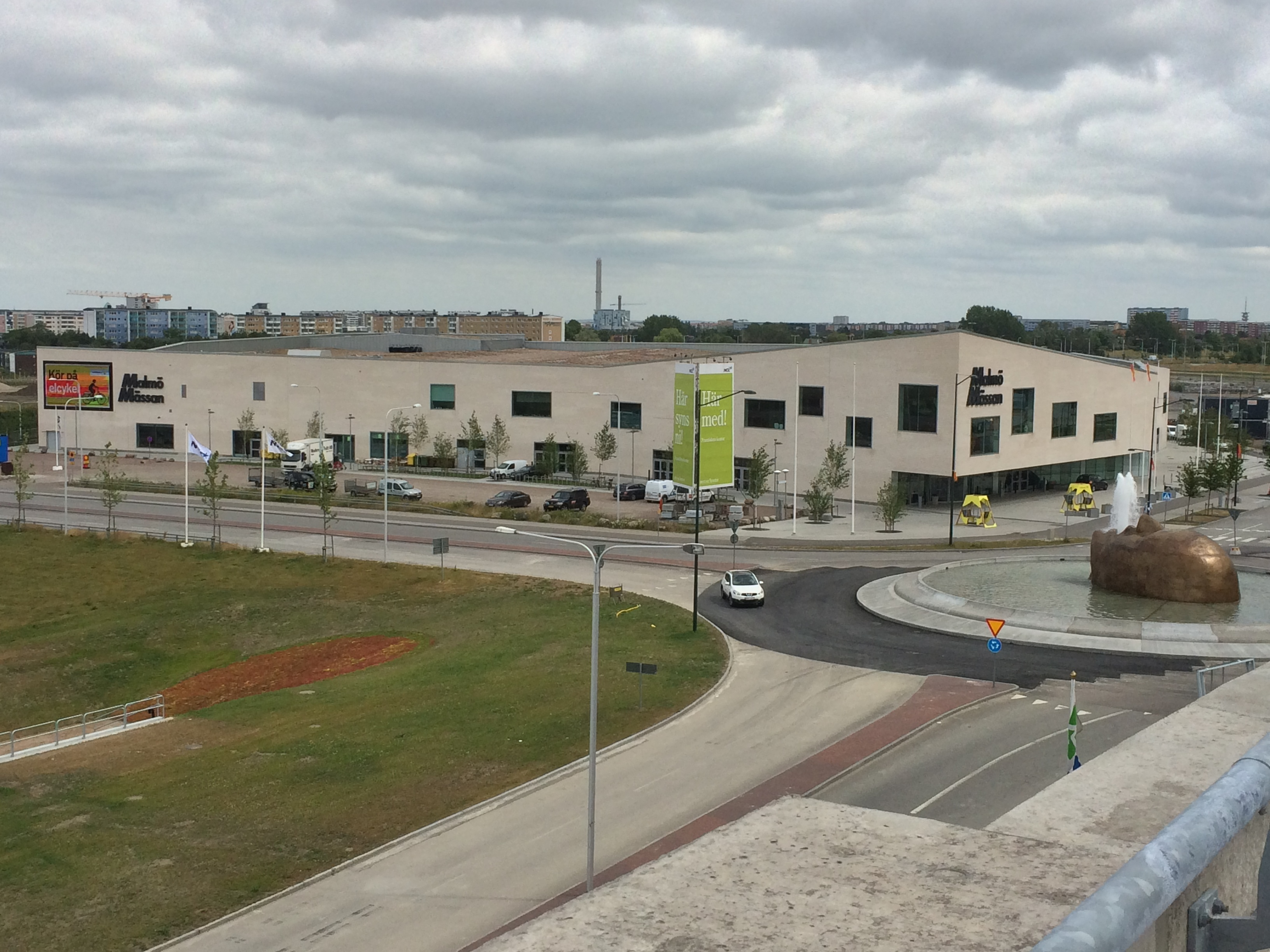
The new MalmöMässan in June 2014.

MalmöMässan is an exhibition and convention centre in Malmö, Sweden. The facility is located in the Hyllie area, close to Malmö Arena and has an area of 20,000 m², divided into exhibition hall, a conference centre and two restaurants.

One of the major annual events held there is Skånemässan ("The Scania fair") held in September and with about 25,000 visitors.

== History ==
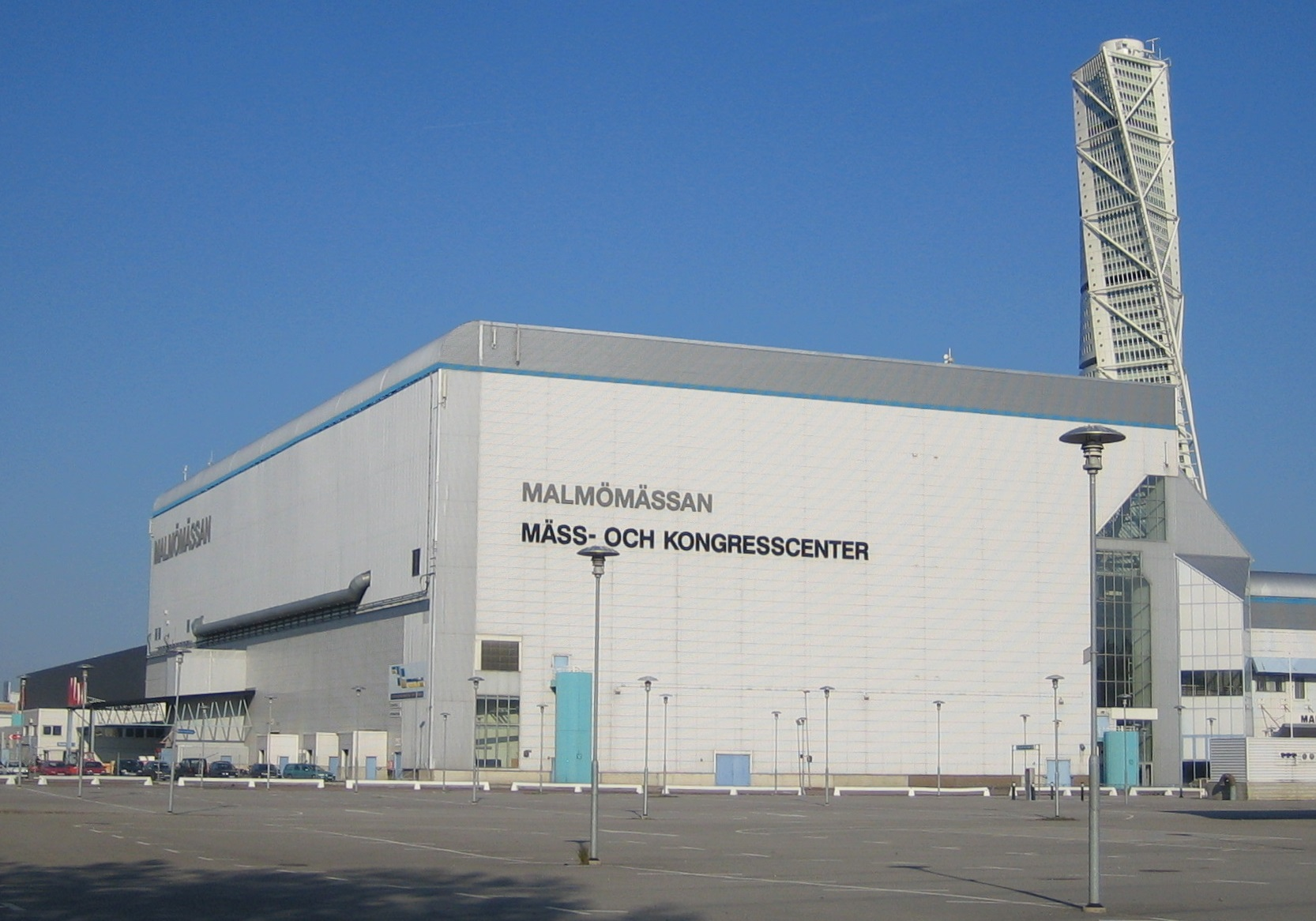
The former building in May 2007, known as "Hall 7", and Turning Torso in the background.

The former Malmömässan Convention Centre (55°36′44″N 12°58′50″E) in the west harbour area of Malmö closed on 31 March 2010. The old building had an area of 20,000 m² and was originally built as a manufacturing hall by the Kockums shipyard, it was turned into a SAAB factory following the Swedish shipyard crisis of the late 1970s and 1980s.

In the early 1990s MalmöMässan AB, earlier based in Stadionområdet, Malmö ("The stadium area", where Malmö Stadion and Malmö Isstadion are located), relocated there.

A new exhibition hall was built in Hyllie, opened in February 2012 by architect Erik Giudice.

== Events ==
- Bröllopsmässan Malmö 2014 – February 2014
