= Danica =

Danica may refer to:

- Danica (given name), people with the given name
- Danica concentration camp, in the Independent State of Croatia
- A personification of the morning star in Slavic mythology
- Danica ilirska (Illyrian Danica), a nineteenth-century Croatian magazine
- Ephemera danica, a species of mayfly

== See also ==
- Danika (disambiguation)
- Danish (disambiguation), Danica in Latin
