= Danika =

Danika may refer to:

== People ==
- Danika Atchia (born 1997), Mauritian model
- Danika Brace, American football coach and former player
- Danika Yarosh (born 1998), American actress

== Other uses ==
- Danika (film), 2006 psychological thriller film

== See also ==
- Danica (disambiguation)
