= Elvira Dolinar =

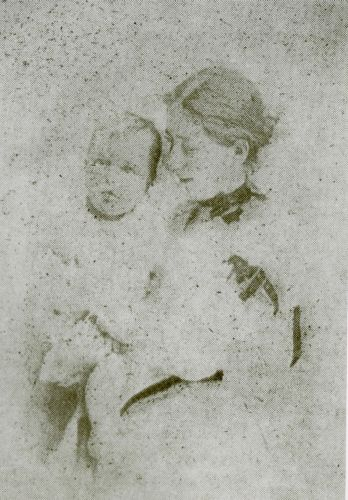
Elvira Dolinar

Elvira Dolinar (pen name Danica; 1870–1961) was a Slovenian writer, feminist and teacher. She is best known for writing in favour of women's rights in the magazine Slovenka, and is considered the first Slovenian feminist.

== Biography ==
Dolinar was born in 1870 in Krško to parents of Austrian and German origin. She trained as a teacher, since teaching was, at the time, one of the only intellectual professions in Slovenia considered acceptable for women, but she later stopped teaching after getting married. She and her husband had four children; she would use her daughter's name, Danica, as her pen name.

Dolinar became interested in women's issues while studying to become a teacher, which inspired her to write articles on the subject that were published in various Austrian magazines. Her most influential work was published in Slovenka ("Slovene Woman"), a magazine run from 1897 to 1902 that featured writing mainly by female teachers. She wrote more than 40 articles for Slovenka promoting women's rights. With her first article, "Ženska emancipacija" ("Women's emancipation"), published in 1897, she became the magazine's first contributor to explicitly promote women's rights, and has since been considered the first Slovenian feminist. Her most influential and widely read article, "Svobodna ljubezen in zakon" ("Free love and marriage"), was published in 1900 and proclaimed that divorce ought to be permissible when both spouses found the relationship "unbearable", a sentiment that contradicted the Catholic values held by most Slovenians at the time. She was widely criticised, especially by Catholics, for her views. In addition to journalism and opinion writing, she also wrote fiction.

Dolinar died in 1961 in Bled. Throughout the period during which Slovenia was governed by communist Yugoslavia, beginning in 1945, Dolinar and other activists for the feminist movement were condemned, and only since Slovenia gained independence from Yugoslavia in 1991 has she been regarded as "a pioneer of Slovenian feminist thought".
