= Scaniaparken =

Park in Malmö, Sweden

Coordinates: 55°37′5″N 12°58′33″E

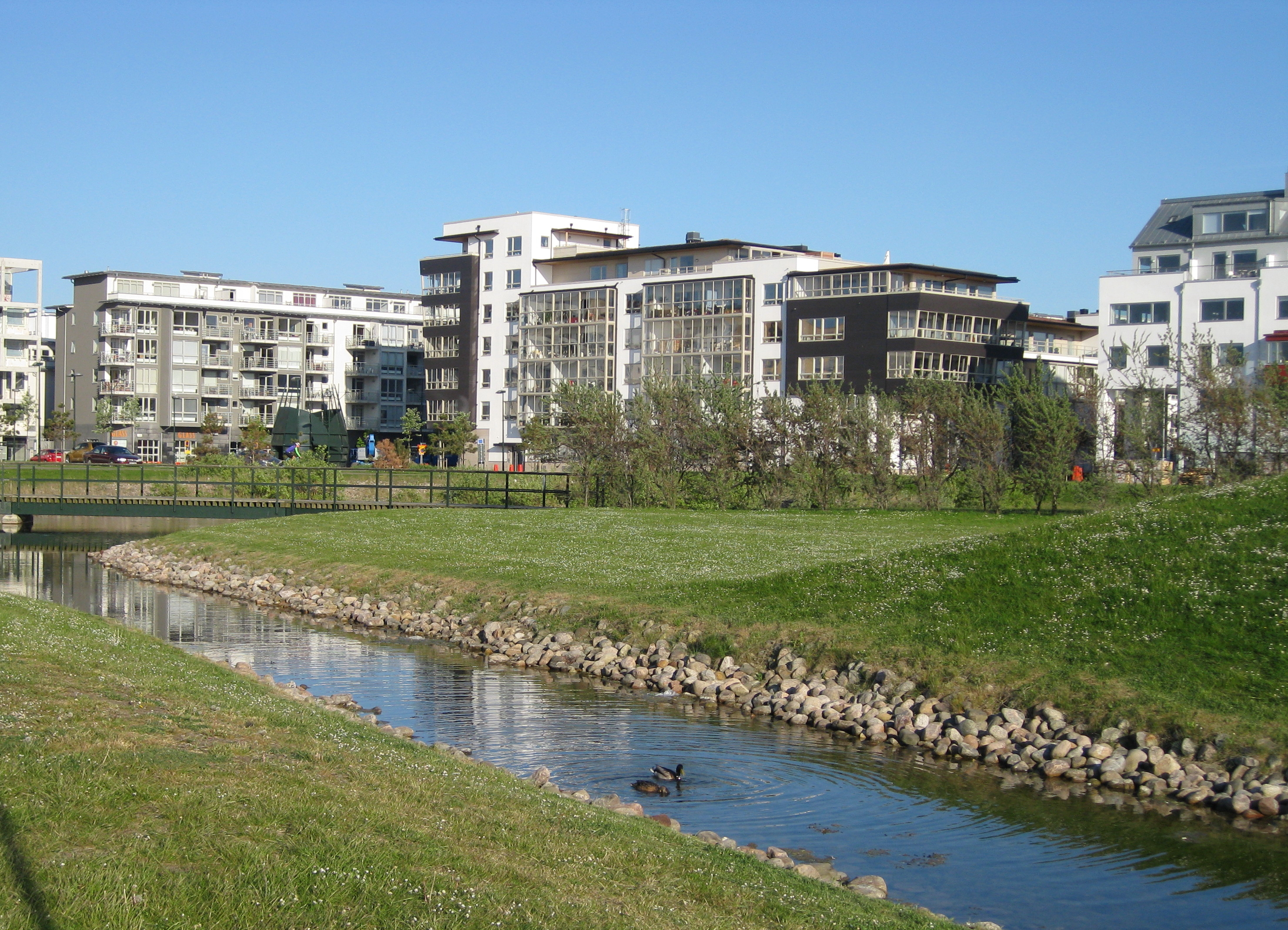
Scaniaparken in 2008

Scaniaparken is a park in Malmö, Sweden. It was built in the early 1990s on the waterfront.

Scaniaparken was built as a narrow strip along the beach around the earlier Kockum area. The name probably comes from the large Kockum construction building that became a SAAB factory during the park construction. A part of the park was claimed for the housefair Bo01. Nowadays, only the northern part is left. The park mainly consists of grass hills. In 2005 Malmö City built a bathing site in Scaniaparken.
