= Dania Park =

Park in Malmö, Sweden

Coordinates: 55°36′50″N 12°58′18″E

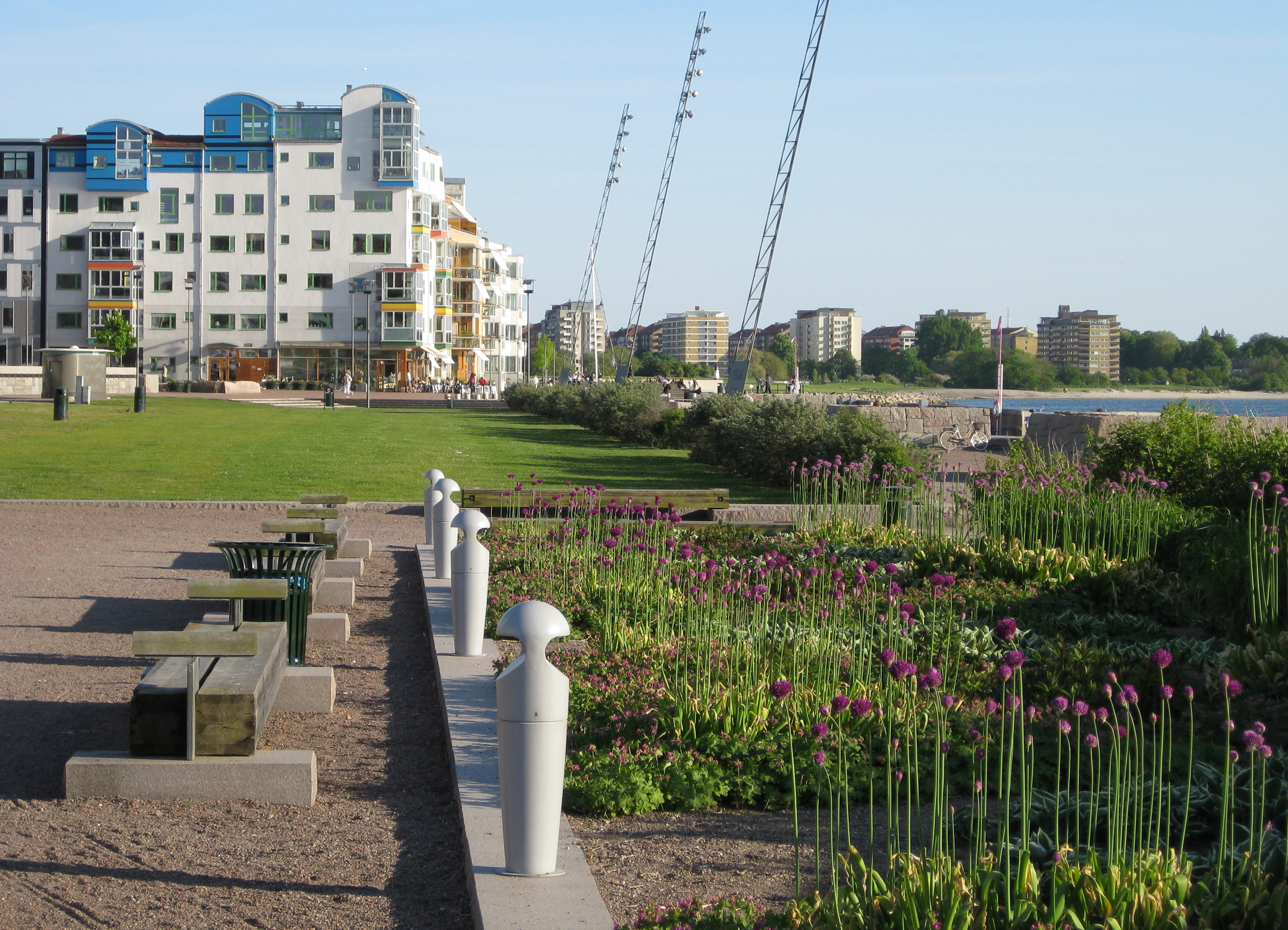
Dania Park

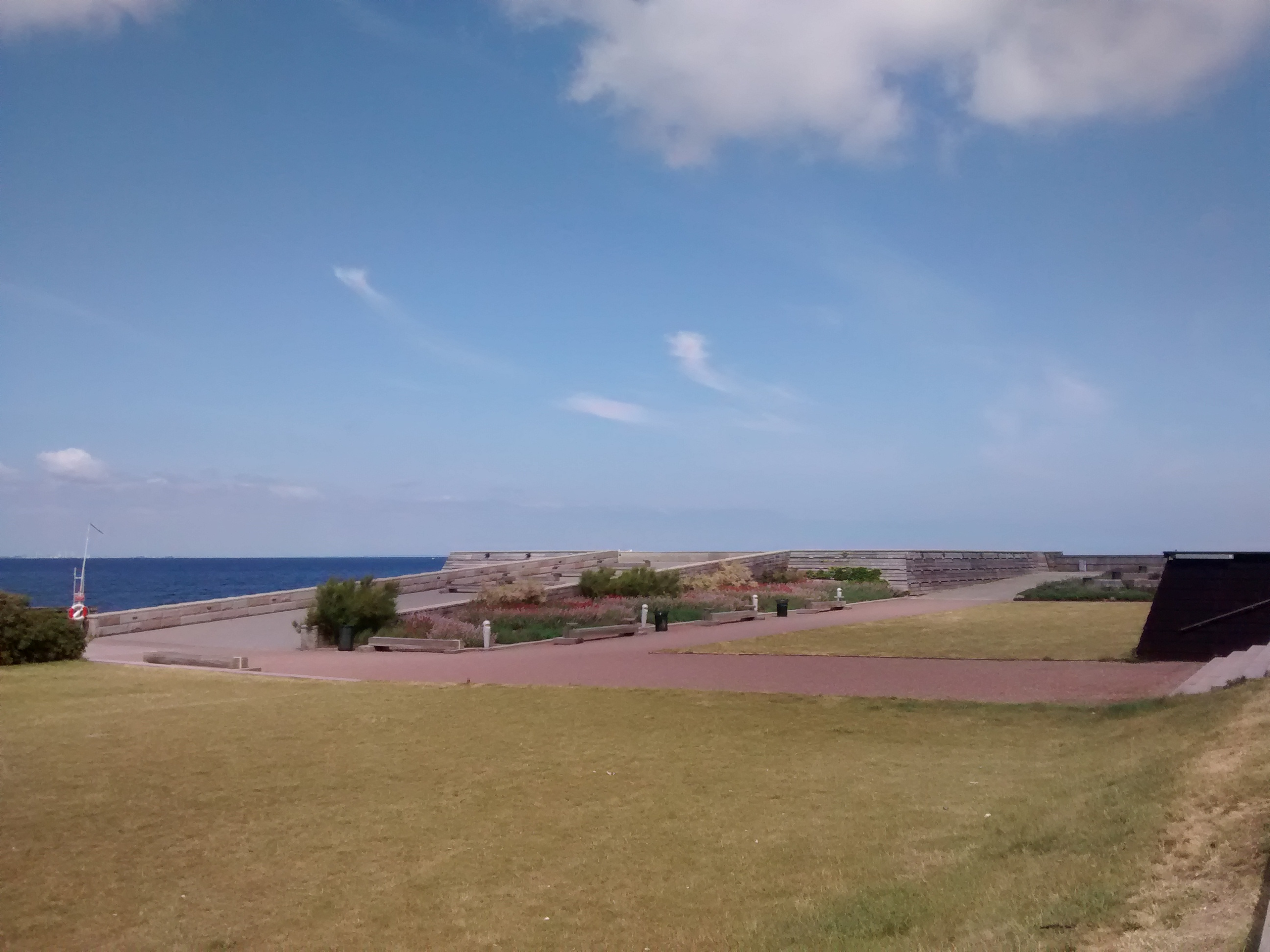
Dania Park

Dania Park, also known as Daniaparken, is located on the Bo01 district in Malmö, Sweden and was designed by architects Thorbjörn Andersson and PeGe Hillinge of SWECO FFS Architects in 1999. Aside from being the first park in over 50 years to be built in the city, it is also a former Saab factory, because of which the site's contamination made it unsuitable for large plant planting, thus the area is mostly grass covered, but is mostly characterized by terraces, platforms and balconies which overlook the Öresund Sound.

== Features ==
This park features a number of facilities and elements which makes the site unique. To counter the flatness of the site due to the lack of vertical elements such as trees, a number of terraces, balconies and platforms are located throughout the area. A grassy area facilitates "al-fresco" seating and allows for relaxation, reading, sunbathing, and other leisure activities. Stairs are also located throughout the coastline which allows visitors to access the water level. This makes the site intimately connected to the waterfront and is why most of the activities are oriented towards the sound. This same element is the parks downfall during the winter cold. The openness and lack of cover, except for a granite wall which provides some areas of shelter and seating, makes the site usable for only the warmer part of the year. On the other hand, features like the 25' wooden wall that lies waterside, although unintended, gives bathers a wall to climb and an adventurous element to the site.
