= Øresund Line =

Railway line in Denmark and Sweden

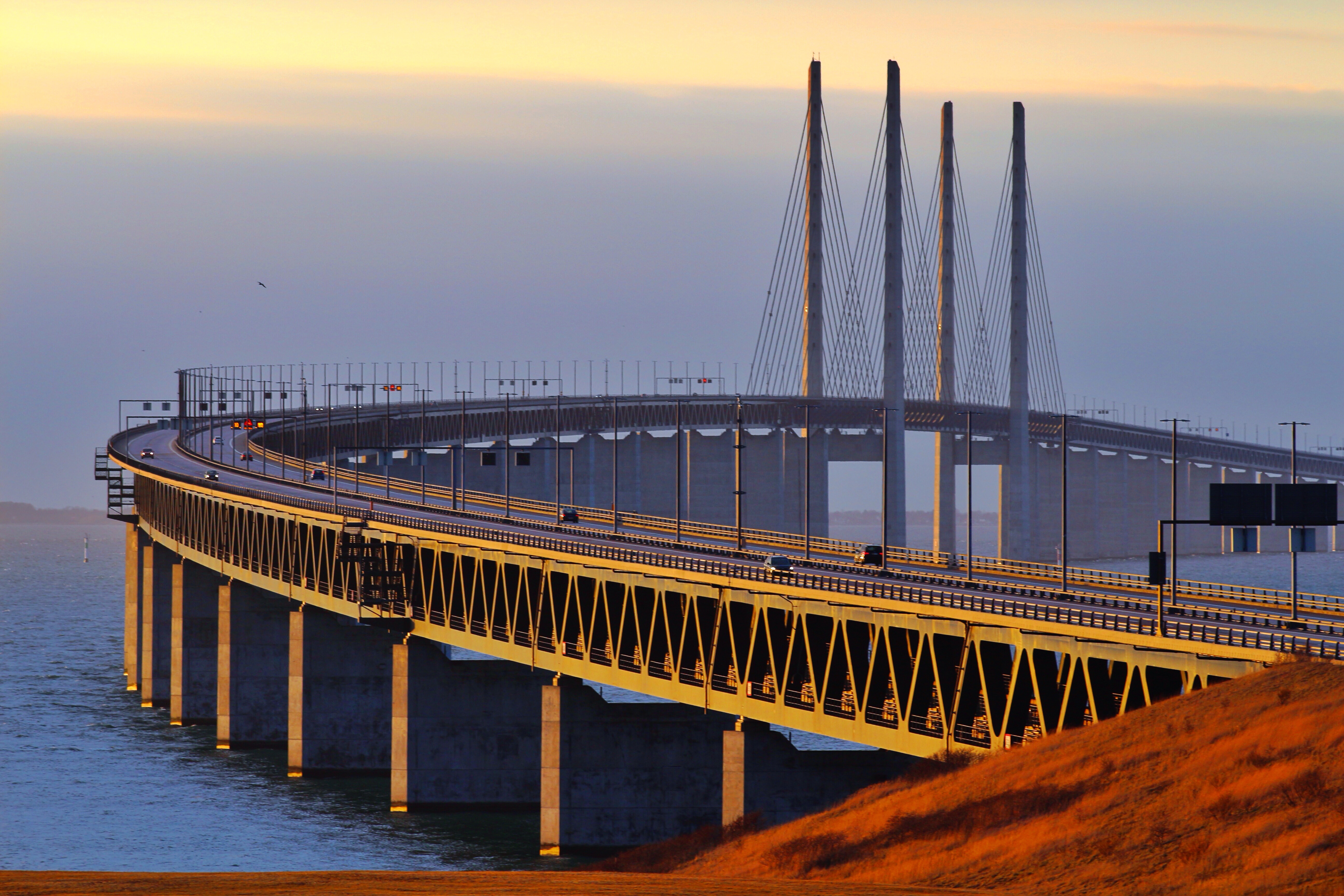
- The Øresund Bridge

Overview
- Owner: Swedish Transport Administration; Banedanmark
- Termini: Malmö Central Station; Copenhagen Central Station
- Stations: 7

Service
- Type: High-speed railway
- System: Danish railways Swedish railways
- Operator(s): DSB; SJ; Skånetrafiken; Snälltåget; Øresundståg; DB Cargo; Green Cargo; Hector Rail; Strukton Rail
- Rolling stock: SJ X2; SJ 2000; X31K; X32K; EG; ET

History
- Opened: 2000

Technical
- Line length: 46 km
- Track length: 92 km
- Number of tracks: Double
- Character: Passenger and freight
- Track gauge: 1,435 mm (4 ft 8 1/2 in)
- Electrification: 15 kV 16.7 Hz AC; 25 kV 50 Hz AC
- Operating speed: 200 km/h (125 mph)

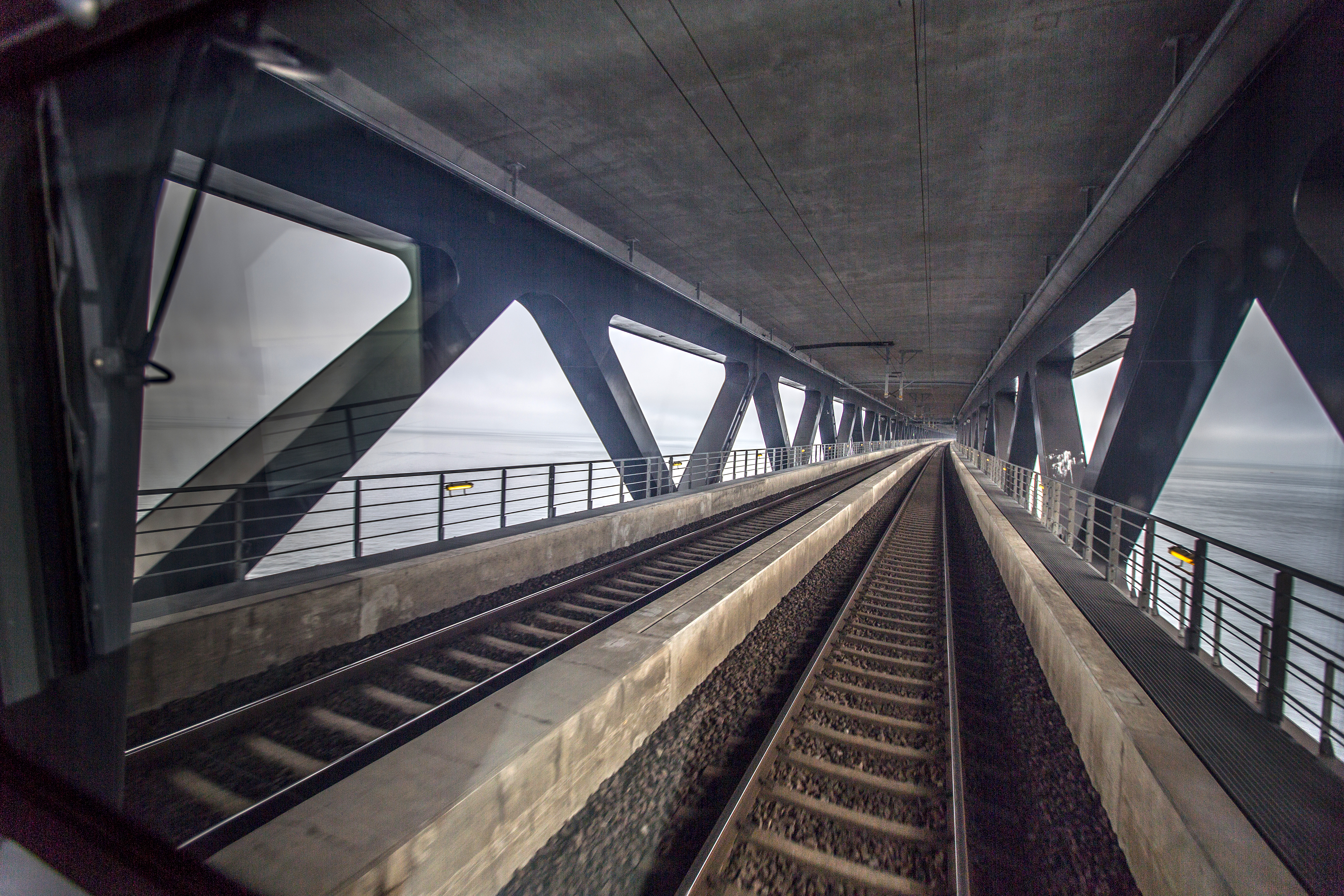
The Øresund Line on the Øresund Bridge

The Øresund Line (Swedish: Öresundsbanan, Danish: Øresundbanen) is a railway between Copenhagen in Denmark and Malmö in Sweden via the Øresund Bridge. It operates 24/7, and a journey between the two cities takes 35 to 40 minutes. On the Swedish side it is managed by the Swedish Transport Administration, on the Danish side by Banedanmark.

The railway line approaches Copenhagen from the Continental Line south of Malmö and heads west, passing over the Øresund Bridge on the lower section of the Peberholm artificial island, under Copenhagen Airport to Copenhagen Central Station. In Malmö, the City Tunnel connects the railway directly to Malmö C.

Øresundståg lit. 'Øresund train' are operated by VR Sverige AB on the Swedish and Danish side. They connect Copenhagen and Malmö, with onward connections to Gothenburg, Kalmar, and Karlskrona. On the Danish side, the trains continue northwards on the Boulevard Line to Østerport. DSB also operates InterCity and regional services to Aarhus and Slagelse from CPH Airport station. SJ operates SJ X2000 high-speed trains between Stockholm, Malmö, and Copenhagen. Freight trains are operated by Railion using EG locomotives.

== History ==
Plans for connecting Scania and Zealand with a bridge had been raised throughout the entire 20th century, and in 1991 a company was created to start the work. Construction of the Øresund Bridge and Øresund Railway started in 1995 and was completed in 2000. According to UIC this rail line had in 2012 the most expensive second class rail tickets in Europe with a price of 0.21 Euro per km. The investigation encompassed 103 rail lines. This price is calculated on the distance Malmö-Copenhagen of 52.7 kilometres (32.7 mi) which does not include the shortening by Citytunneln and which made the per-km price higher compared to Eurostar.

== Future ==
It has been proposed to complement the Øresund Line with a metro link called the Øresundsmetro. This would directly connect Malmö to the Copenhagen Metro system and reduce journey times between the two city centres from 35 minutes to 20 minutes.

== City Tunnel ==
Since December 2010, Øresund trains use the City Tunnel in Malmö, with its stations at Hyllie and Triangeln, thereby saving one minute for passengers to Malmö C and about 15 to 20 minutes for passengers to Triangeln.

== Border technicalities ==
One of the challenges with the line was the incompatibility between the railway electrification systems in Denmark and Sweden. Denmark uses 25 kV 50 Hz AC while Sweden uses 15 kV 16.7 Hz AC.

The signalling systems in the two countries are also different. The problems were overcome by requiring all trains operating on the line to be dual voltage and have dual signalling systems, including a minority of the X2 trains operated throughout Sweden by SJ. The signalling system switches on Peberholm in Denmark, so the entire bridge uses the Swedish signalling, but the Danish electrical system. The Danish signalling system is only approved for 180 km/h (110 mph) speed, while the Swedish system is approved for 200 km/h (125 mph). The entire bridge has 200 km/h (125 mph) maximum speed, including the Danish part.

On double-track lines in Denmark, trains run on the right; in Sweden, they run on the left. On the Øresund Line, trains runs on the right hand track, changing sides at a flyover north of the Malmö C, resulting in trains in the Malmö area using the Danish standard.

On Autumn 2015, border controls started at Hyllie station. They cause a delay in the traffic there. Furthermore, from January 2016, a carrier's responsibility law was in effect, so all passengers had to go through identity check at Copenhagen Airport station, and all passengers from other Danish stations had to disembark, change track and go through the identity check. These checks were abolished in May 2017, after the EU commission declared such checks not acceptable.

== Line ==
- Sweden
  - Lund Central Station, Lund.
  - around Arlöv's former sugar factory – change for the dual tracks' left side traffic (in Sweden north of this location) to right side traffic (Danish standard for such railways).
  - Burlöv station
  - Malmö Central Station (at the underground platforms, which are also the through platforms)
  - Triangeln station, Malmö (an underground railway station).
  - Hyllie station, Malmö.
  - Lernacken (not a station, but the location where the fixed connection begins, at the Swedish side) – Enter the Øresund Bridge, change of electric voltage.
- Denmark
  - Peberholm (not a station but an artificial island) – Change of signalling system.
  - Copenhagen Airport, Kastrup Station (underground railway station), Tårnby. – Connection to Copenhagen Metro.
  - Tårnby Station (underground railway station), Tårnby.
  - Ørestad Station, Copenhagen. – Metro crosses the Øresund Railway
  - Copenhagen Central Station
  - Nørreport Station (underground railway station), Copenhagen.
  - Østerport Station, Copenhagen.

The Øresundståg stops at the stations above. A few daily trains to Stockholm stop only at Malmö Central Station, Copenhagen Airport and Copenhagen Central Station (København H). From Lund C to Copenhagen there is an hourly late night service. The journey takes about an hour.

=== History ===
The fixed connection across the Øresund was inaugurated on 1 July 2000. Between the inauguration and December 2010, the tunnel through Malmö was not in operation and a far longer path was used. Trains had to drive in to Malmö Central Station and after some 20 minutes, the train could depart for Copenhagen, but then had "to reverse" for several minutes (that is, reverse out of Malmö the same way the trains came in), followed by a long detour which orbited most of Malmö, before reaching the new fixed connection. Svågertorp railway station was then the last station in Sweden. It is still in use for Pågatåg local trains.

== See also ==
- List of railway lines in Denmark
- List of railway lines in Sweden
- Rail transport in Denmark
- History of rail transport in Denmark
- Rail transport in Sweden
- History of rail transport in Sweden
