= Malmö Central Station =

Railway station in Malmö, Sweden

Malmö C
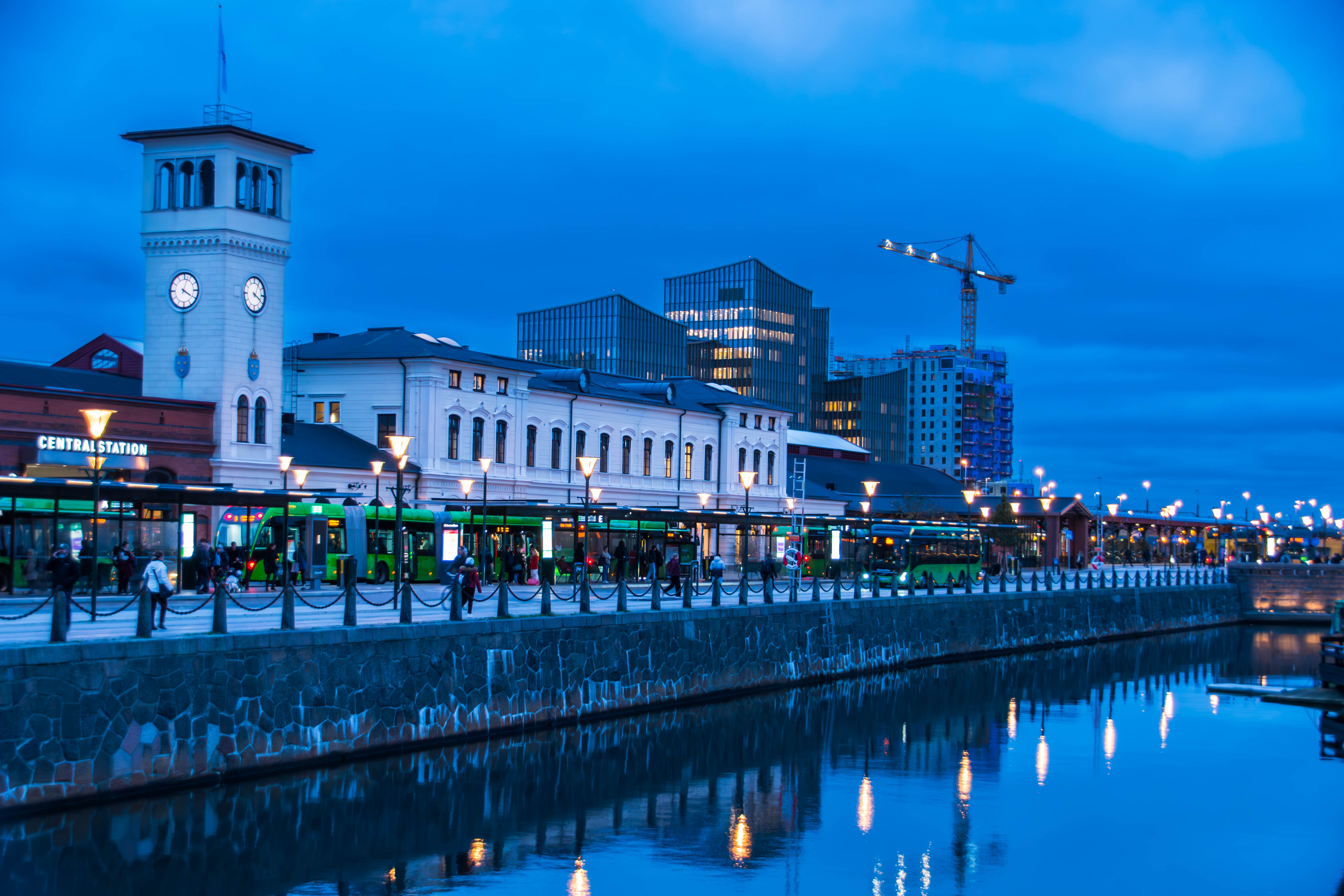
- Main entrance with local bus station in the foreground

General information
- Location: Skeppsbron 1; 211 20 Malmö; Malmö Municipality; Sweden
- Coordinates: 55°36′34″N 13°00′03″E
- Elevation: 3 m (9.8 ft)
- Owner: Jernhusen (station infrastructure); Trafikverket (rail infrastructure)
- Operator: SJ
- Lines: Malmö-Köpenhamn; Malmö-Katrineholm
- Platforms: 6
- Tracks: 11

History
- Opened: 1856; 170 years ago

Services
Preceding station	SJ	Following station
Lund C towards Stockholm C	Southern Main Line	Copenhagen Airport towards Köpenhamn H
Lund C towards Stockholm C	EuroNight	Copenhagen Airport towards Hamburg Hbf or Berlin Hbf
Lund C towards Göteborg C	West Coast Line	Terminus
Preceding station	Regional trains	Following station
Lund C towards Oslo S	RE20	Terminus
Preceding station	Long distance trains	Following station
Lund C towards Stockholm C	Snälltåget	Terminus
Lund C towards Stockholm C	Snälltåget seasonal	Örestad towards Berlin Hbf
Lund C towards Duved	Snälltåget seasonal	Terminus
Preceding station	Øresundståg	Following station
Triangeln towards Østerport	Copenhagen–Lund Øresundståg	Lund C Terminus
Triangeln towards Østerport	Copenhagen–Gothenburg Øresundståg	Lund C towards Göteborg C
Triangeln towards Østerport	Copenhagen–Kalmar Øresundståg	Lund C towards Kalmar C
Triangeln towards Østerport	Copenhagen–Karlskrona Øresundståg	Lund C towards Karlskrona C
Preceding station	Pågatågen	Following station
Triangeln towards Hyllie	Line 2A	Burlöv towards Helsingborg C
Triangeln towards Hyllie	Line 3	Burlöv towards Helsingborg C
Triangeln towards Hyllie	Line 4	Burlöv towards Kristianstad C
Triangeln towards Simrishamn	Line 6	Burlöv towards Lund C
Triangeln towards Hyllie	Line 8	Burlöv towards Åstorp
Triangeln towards Trelleborg	Line 9	Burlöv towards Lund C
Terminus	Line 11	Östervärn towards Kävlinge
Location

Malmö Central Station (Swedish: Malmö centralstation; abbreviated Malmö C) is the main railway station serving the city of Malmö, Sweden. It is located in central Malmö, situated between the historic city centre and the Port of Malmö. Opened on the Southern Main Line in 1856, it serves approximately 17 million passengers per year.

With the opening of the City Tunnel in 2010, the station began through services connecting south to Copenhagen via the Öresund Line, to stations north on the Southern Main Line, saving at least 15 minutes for through passengers.

== Description ==
The central station has ten tracks. Four tracks are underground at the northernmost point of the City Tunnel, and 6 tracks are above ground in the old terminus station. It is marked as a listed building. The station consists mainly of two perpendicular buildings above ground – the central hall and the terminus train shed – and a newer glass corridor in between these two older buildings.

The glass corridor was inaugurated in 2010 as part of the City Tunnel project in order to connect the bus stops south of the station with the platforms, the escalators to the lower-level platforms and the taxi station located just north of the station. Along the corridor are SJ and Skånetrafiken ticket sales, exchange offices and kiosks, making it the main waiting area of the station. The central hall which previously filled that function is since 2011 a food court with a number of restaurants and smaller shops.

The underground platforms can also be accessed from an entrance located just west of the station at the Anna Lindh's place. After midnight here is a smaller area (the one near the underground platforms) that remains open. Is it necessary therefore go in/out from the doors at the side of the station and not from the main entrance.

== History ==
Malmö Station was first opened in 1856, coinciding with the opening of the Malmö–Lund railway. At the time, the area was located on the outer edges of the city, but was convenient for Copenhagen-bound ferries, which loaded and unloaded in the Inre hamnen directly in front of the station building.

The building was nearly destroyed ten years later in a fire, on 14 December 1866. When the building was reconstructed, the bell tower was kept. That part, between the platforms and the square Centralplan, was reopened in 1872.

More and more lines were built, and consequently more tracks and train sheds were needed. The new train shed with four new tracks opened in 1891. The Malmö-Kontinentens Järnväg from Malmö to Trelleborg was built in 1898. In 1926, Malmö Central Station became the station's official name.

Although the train shed was built as a terminus, there was also a single through-line for freight next to the station building, allowing hopper wagons to access the port, where they served a large granary plant producing most of the flour for baking in the counties of Skåne and Halland.

In 2000, both local and long-distance trains began running directly to Denmark via the new Öresund Bridge. Malmö became the centre of the new Öresund train regional railway system spanning eastern Denmark and much of southern Sweden, which in 2009 became integrated with local buses and trains in most of its service areas. The trains were, however, forced to reverse direction in Malmö's terminal station, which created delays for passengers travelling to Denmark from Lund and further north, and restricted the frequency of service, as each train had to both enter and leave Malmö on the same tracks.

This situation was solved with the opening of the City Tunnel in December 2010, finally allowing through traffic. All passenger traffic to/from Denmark now uses the tunnel, and most local trains use it, too, terminating instead at Hyllie station at the other end of the tunnel if not going beyond Malmö.

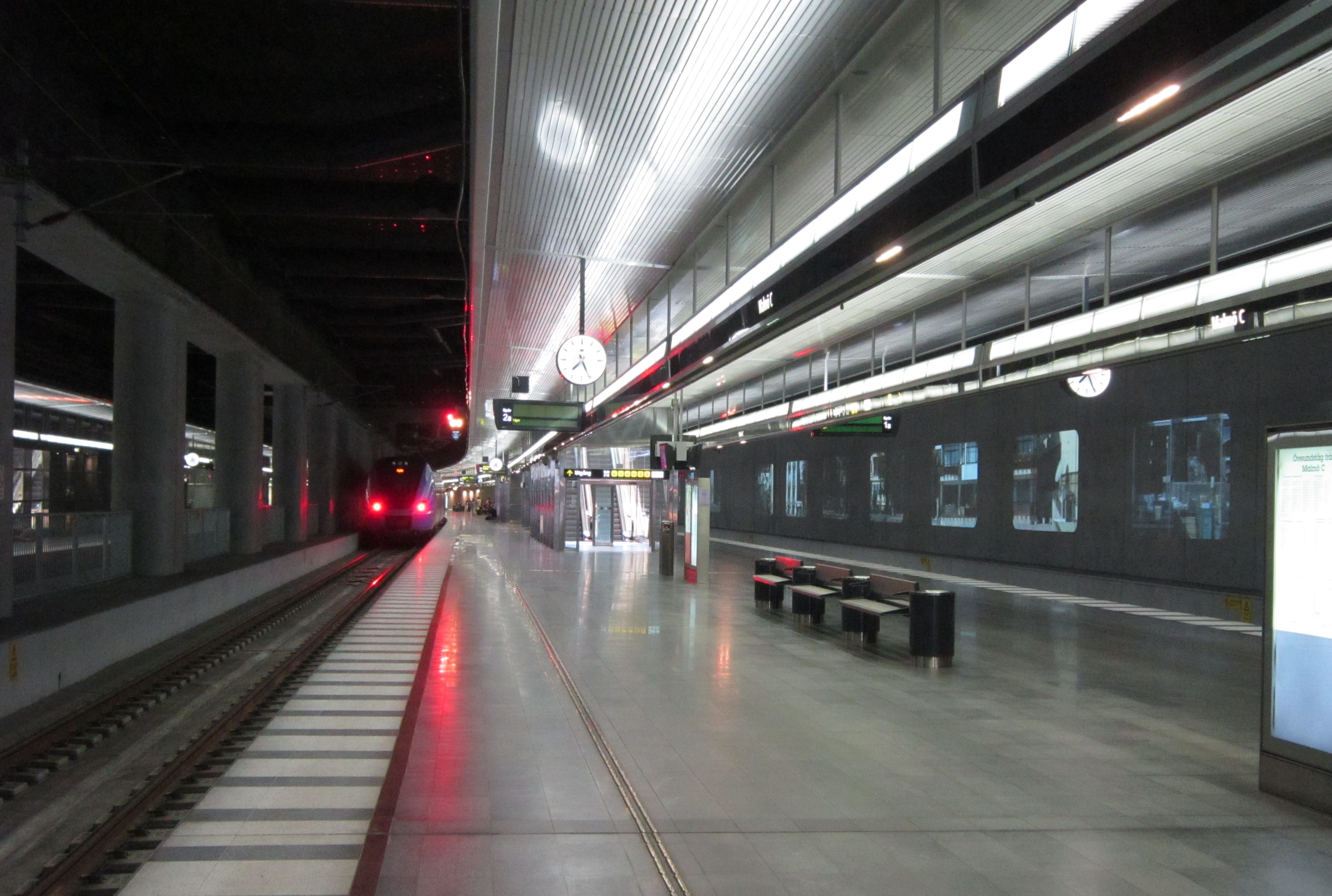
Underground platforms

The tunnel tracks make up tracks 1–4, and most traffic has shifted to this lower level of Malmö Central Station. The terminus station was renovated at the same time to accommodate occasional long-distance trains, including some services to Stockholm and the night express to Berlin. Its tracks are numbered 5–10 (six tracks as opposed to the original seven; one track was torn up during renovation to allow for more commercial space adjacent to the Centralplan bus terminal). The adjacent train shed previously used for local Pågatågen services was demolished in its entirety to allow for an extension to the Centralplan, with its traffic being taken over by the City Tunnel.

== Traffic ==
The stations track layout is numbered 1–10 from north to south, beginning with the four underground through tracks.

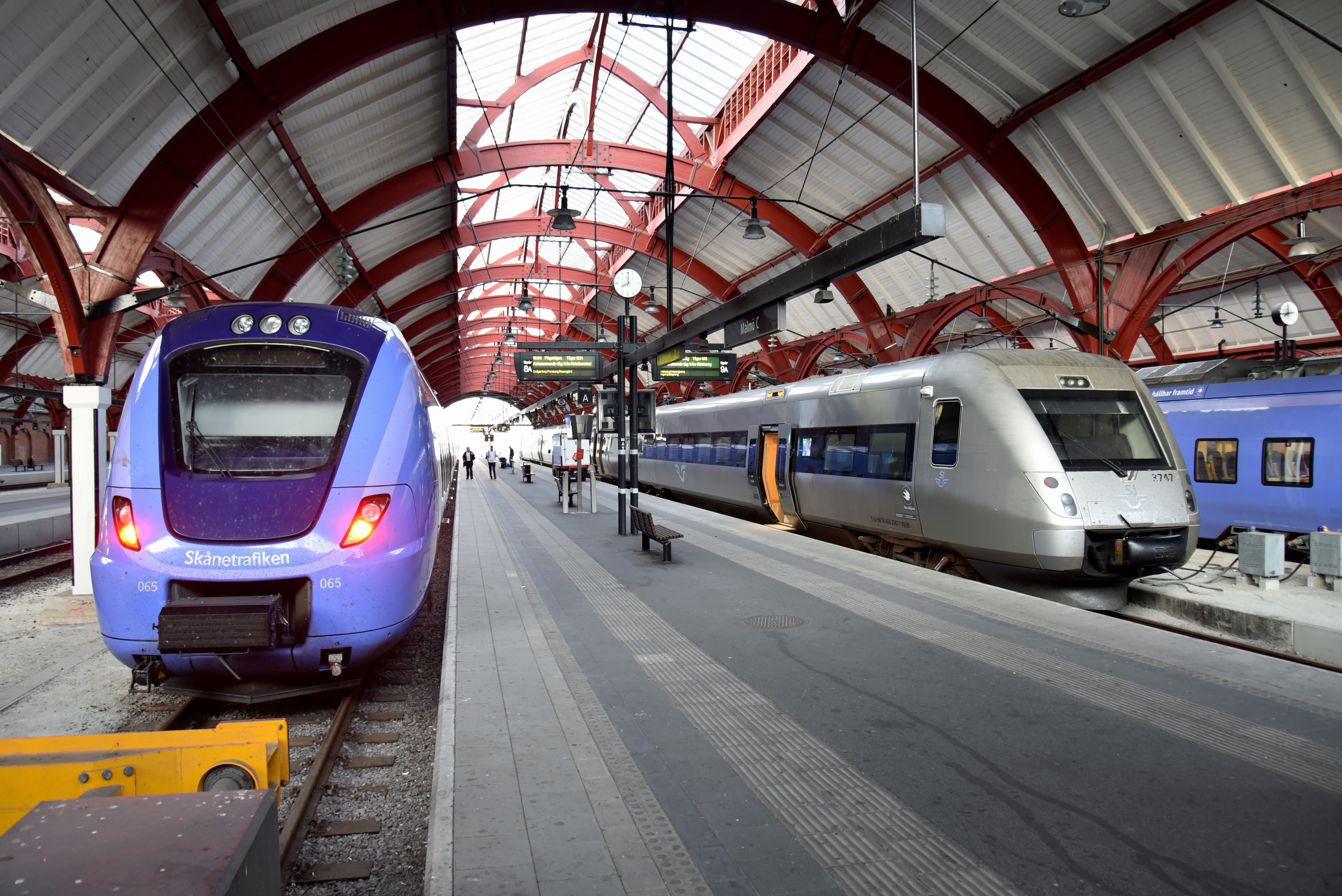
Ground floor platforms and Skånetrafiken and SJ trains

The underground part of the station – tracks 1–4 – is a through station and consists of two island platforms. The northernmost platform (tracks 1–2) is usually served by trains heading south into the city tunnel. This is due to Denmark using right-hand traffic for railway, and not left-hand traffic like Sweden. In order not to have to switch direction of traffic at the Öresund Bridge, which was the case before the City Tunnel extension, and thereby increasing capacity, the switch from left to right traffic now happens entering into the Malmö Central Station's underground tracks coming from north, thus making the entire City Tunnel operate right-hand traffic. The south platform (tracks 3–4) is thus usually served by trains heading north out of the City Tunnel.

The above ground part of the station – tracks 5–10 – is a terminal station made up of four side platforms with two tracks each between the three spaces between these. From here services usually either begin or terminate their route. A decent amount of train services – both local, regional and long-distance – still fall into this category, and thus the terminus station is still in frequent use, though not as frequent as the underground through station.

Just south of the station building is the station's bus terminal. Its western part (modes A-F) is for local city buses, and the eastern part (modes G-I) is used by regional buses, long-distance services and temporary replacement buses.

== Awards ==
In 2011 Malmö Central Station won the Brunel Award for its architecture.

== Gallery ==
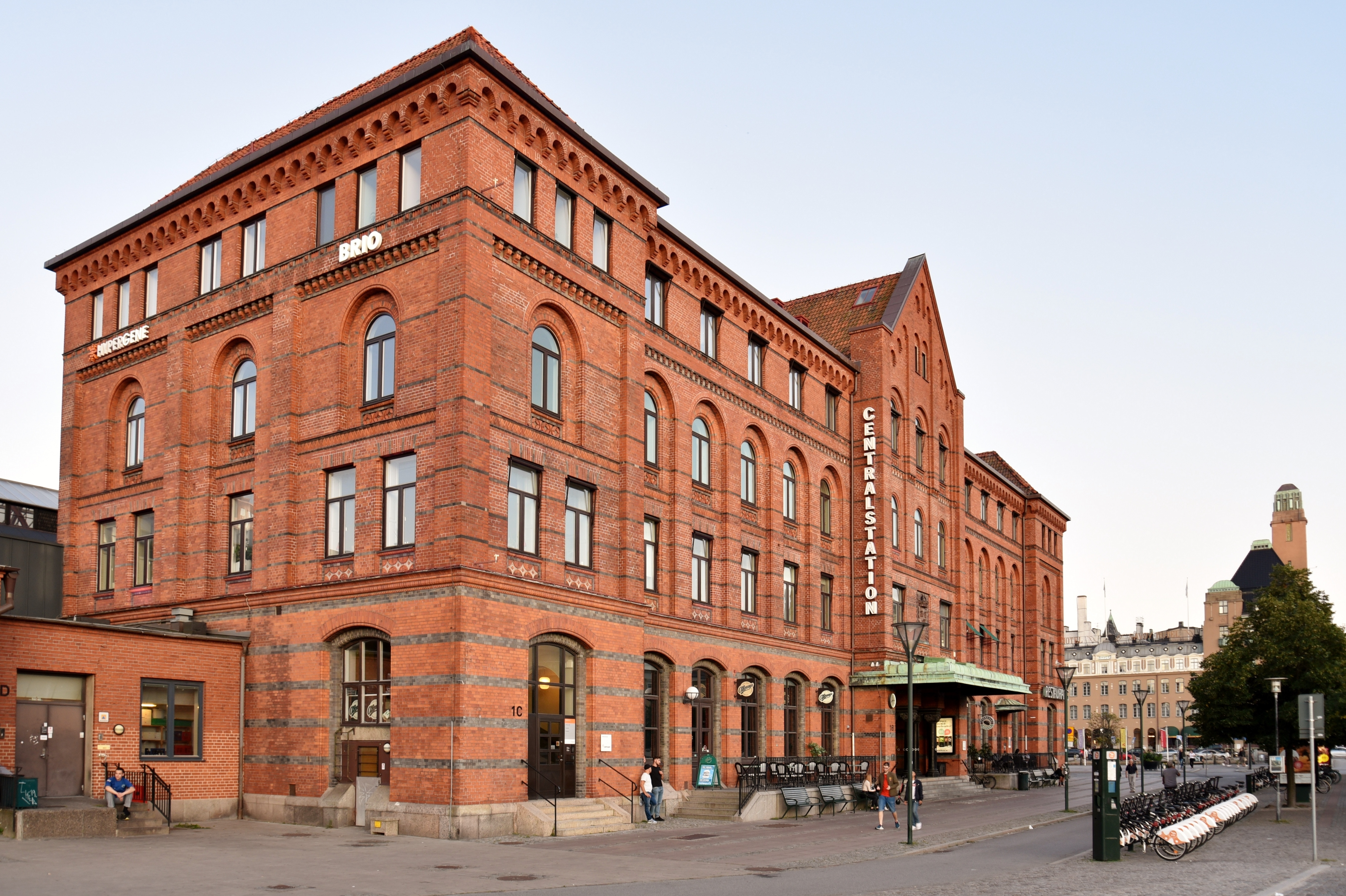
West Façade

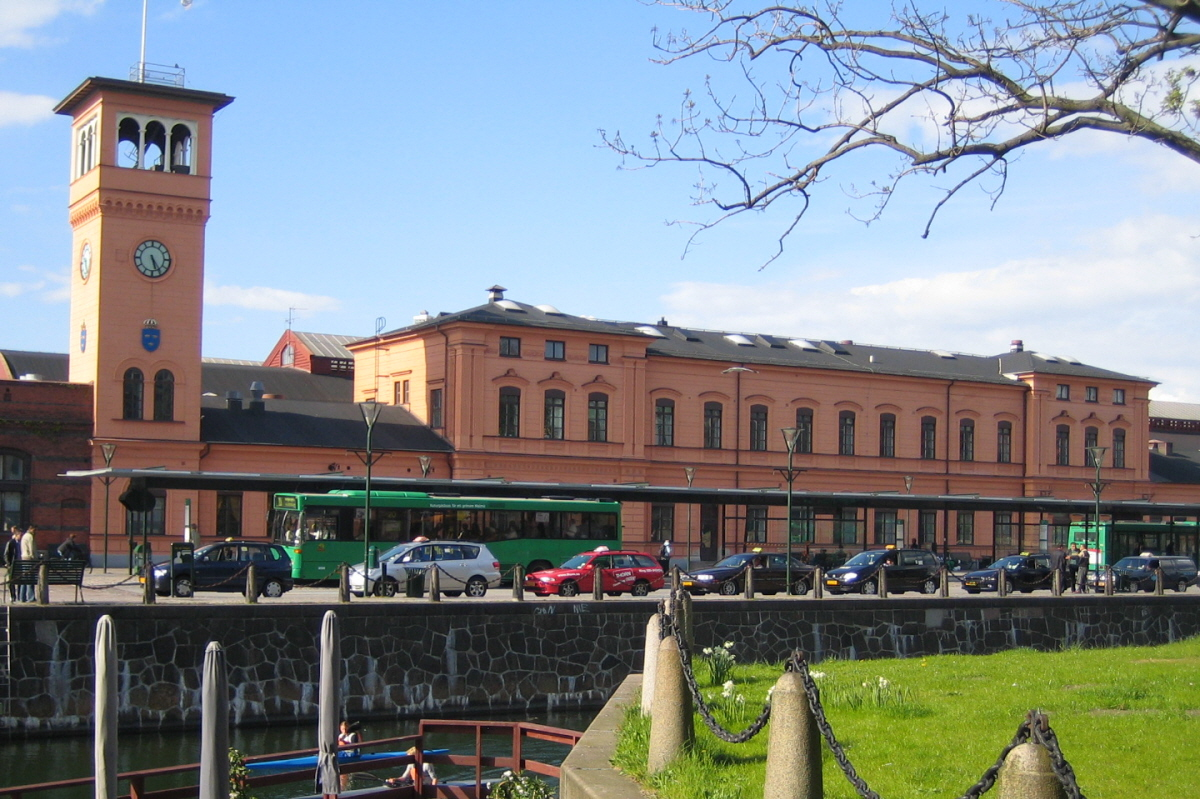
View from Centralplan

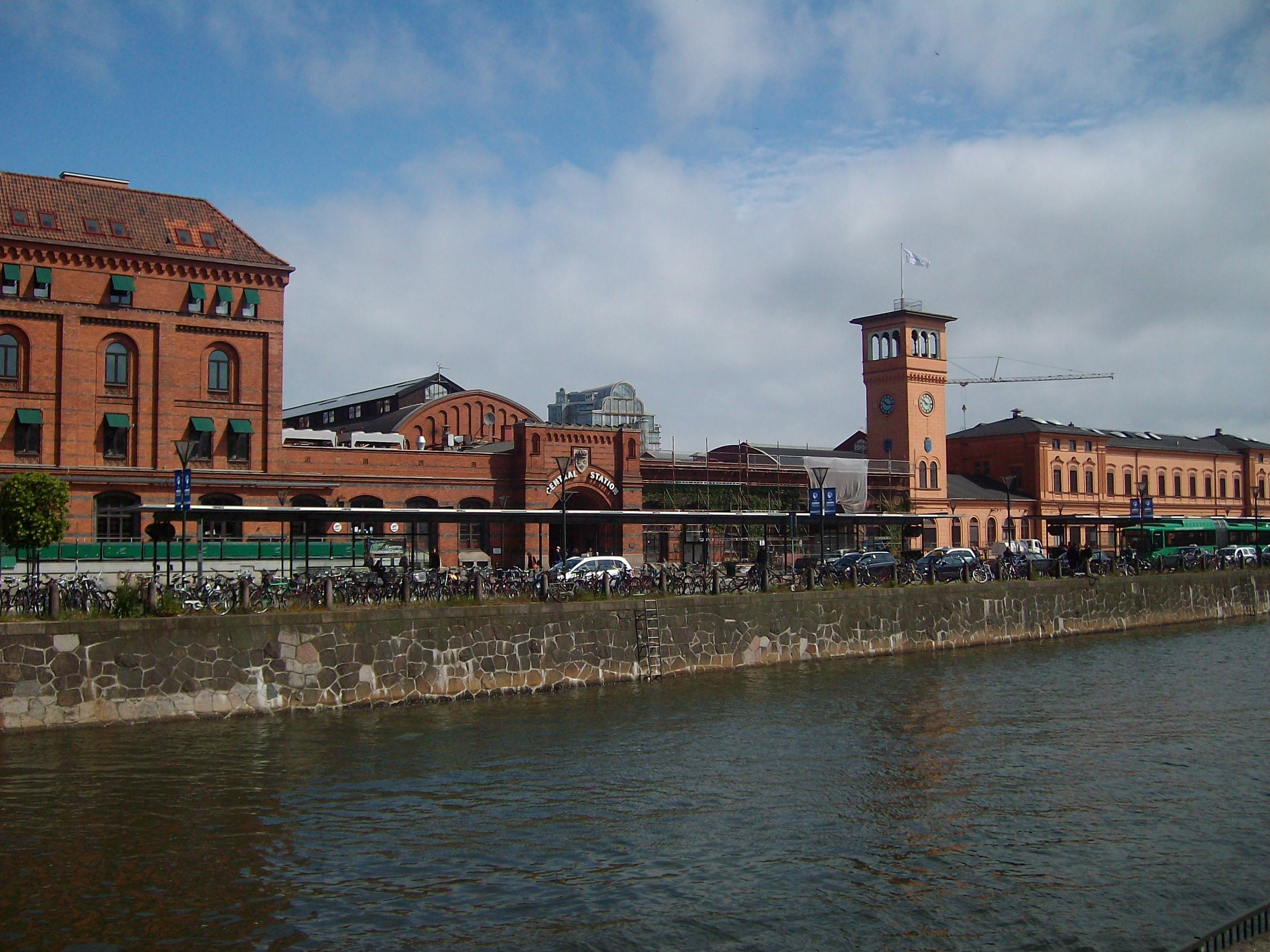
South façade (in its former colours)

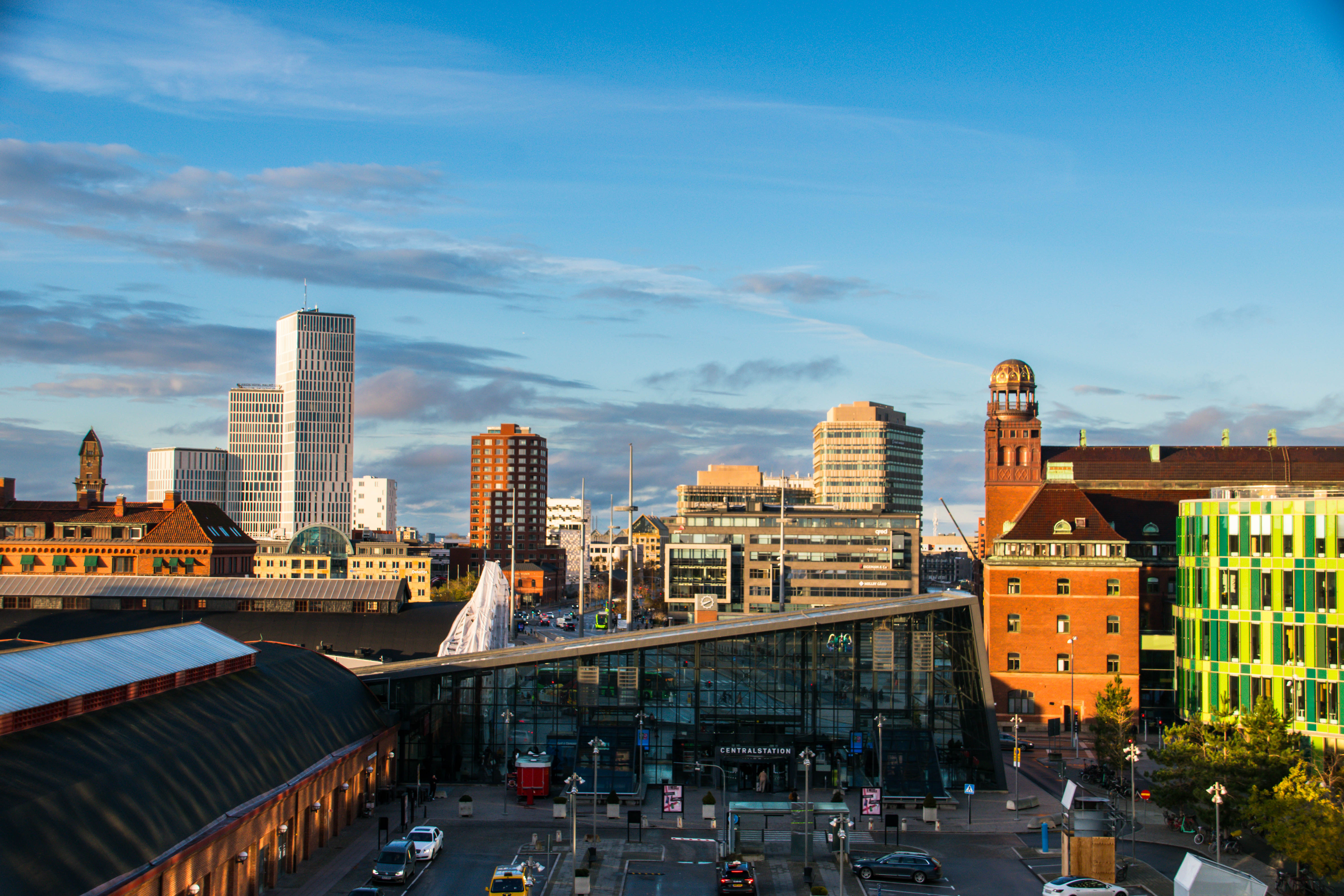
View from parking

== See also ==
- Rail transport in Sweden
