= Hyllie railway station =

Railway station in Malmö, Sweden

Hyllie
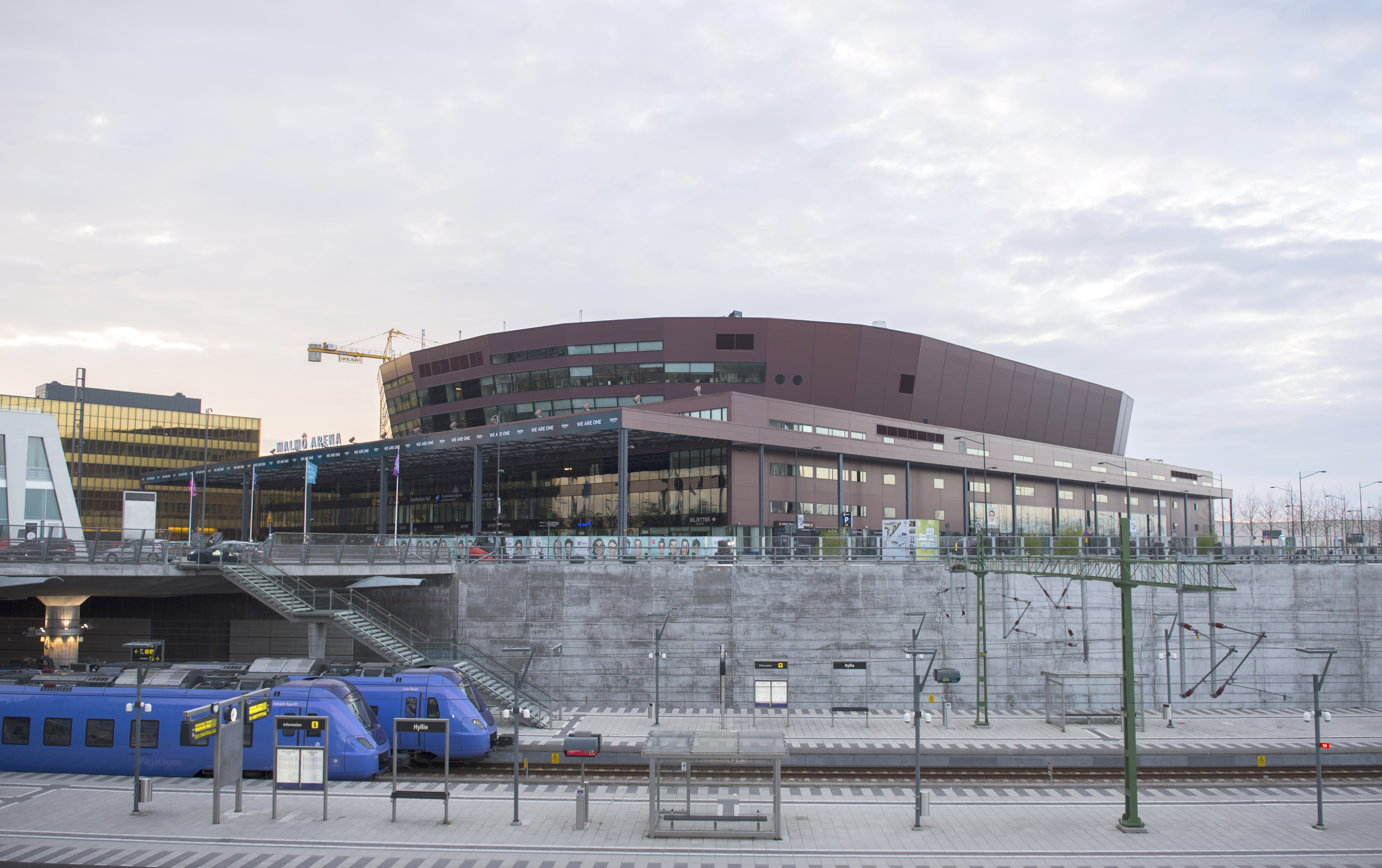
- The station with Malmö Arena in the background

General information
- Location: Malmö, Malmö Municipality; Sweden
- Coordinates: 55°33′46″N 12°58′33″E
- Elevation: 2
- Owner: City of Malmö
- Operator: Trafikverket
- Lines: Öresund Line; City Tunnel; Continental Line; Ystad Line
- Platforms: 2
- Tracks: 4
- Connections: Bus (Skånetrafiken)

Construction
- Structure type: Below grade (ditch)
- Accessible: Yes

History
- Opened: 2010

Passengers
- 20 000 per weekday (2016)

Services
Preceding station	Øresundståg	Following station
Copenhagen Airport towards Østerport	Copenhagen–Lund Øresundståg	Triangeln towards Lund C
Copenhagen Airport towards Østerport	Copenhagen–Gothenburg Øresundståg	Triangeln towards Göteborg C
Copenhagen Airport towards Østerport	Copenhagen–Kalmar Øresundståg	Triangeln towards Kalmar C
Copenhagen Airport towards Østerport	Copenhagen–Karlskrona Øresundståg	Triangeln towards Karlskrona C
Preceding station	Pågatågen	Following station
Terminus	Line 2A	Triangeln towards Helsingborg C
Terminus	Line 3	Triangeln towards Helsingborg C
Terminus	Line 4	Triangeln towards Kristianstad C
Oxie towards Simrishamn	Line 6	Triangeln towards Lund C
Terminus	Line 8	Triangeln towards Åstorp
Svågertorp towards Trelleborg	Line 9	Triangeln towards Lund C
Svågertorp towards Malmö C	Line 11	Triangeln towards Kävlinge
Location

Hyllie Station (Swedish: Hyllie station) is a railway station located in the Hyllie city district in the southwestern part of Malmö, Sweden. It is the final station on the Swedish side of the Öresund Line before trains pass the Öresund Bridge towards Denmark.

The station opened in 2010 as a part of the newly built City Tunnel along with Triangeln railway station and a new underground part of Malmö Central Station. It consists of 2 island platforms serving 4 tracks in an open cut layout.

The station is located next to Malmö Arena and the Emporia shopping mall and is served by Øresundståg regional trains and Pågatågen commuter trains. It is an important hub for regional bus services to/from Trelleborg, Vellinge, Skanör and Falsterbo. Many companies, including Skanska, also have offices in the station area.

== Border control ==
Since 12 November 2015 the Swedish Police perform ID checks on passengers on incoming Øresundståg trains from Denmark via Copenhagen Airport, in response to the European migrant crisis. Trains arriving in Hyllie have to wait around 15 minutes to be cleared for departure. For Swedish and Nordic citizens, a driver's license should suffice. For citizens outside the European Union, Norway and Switzerland, a passport is needed, and if applicable a permit to travel freely within the EU, like a visa or residence permit, is needed. The railway station was built with the Nordic Passport Union and Schengen Agreement in mind, both of which say there are no border control between concerned countries, so no border control facilities were planned. Since the station has four tracks, it was possible to fence one track and perform border control there, although bridge traffic had to be reduced.
