= City Tunnel (Malmö) =

Rail link in Malmö, Sweden

The City Tunnel (Citytunneln)
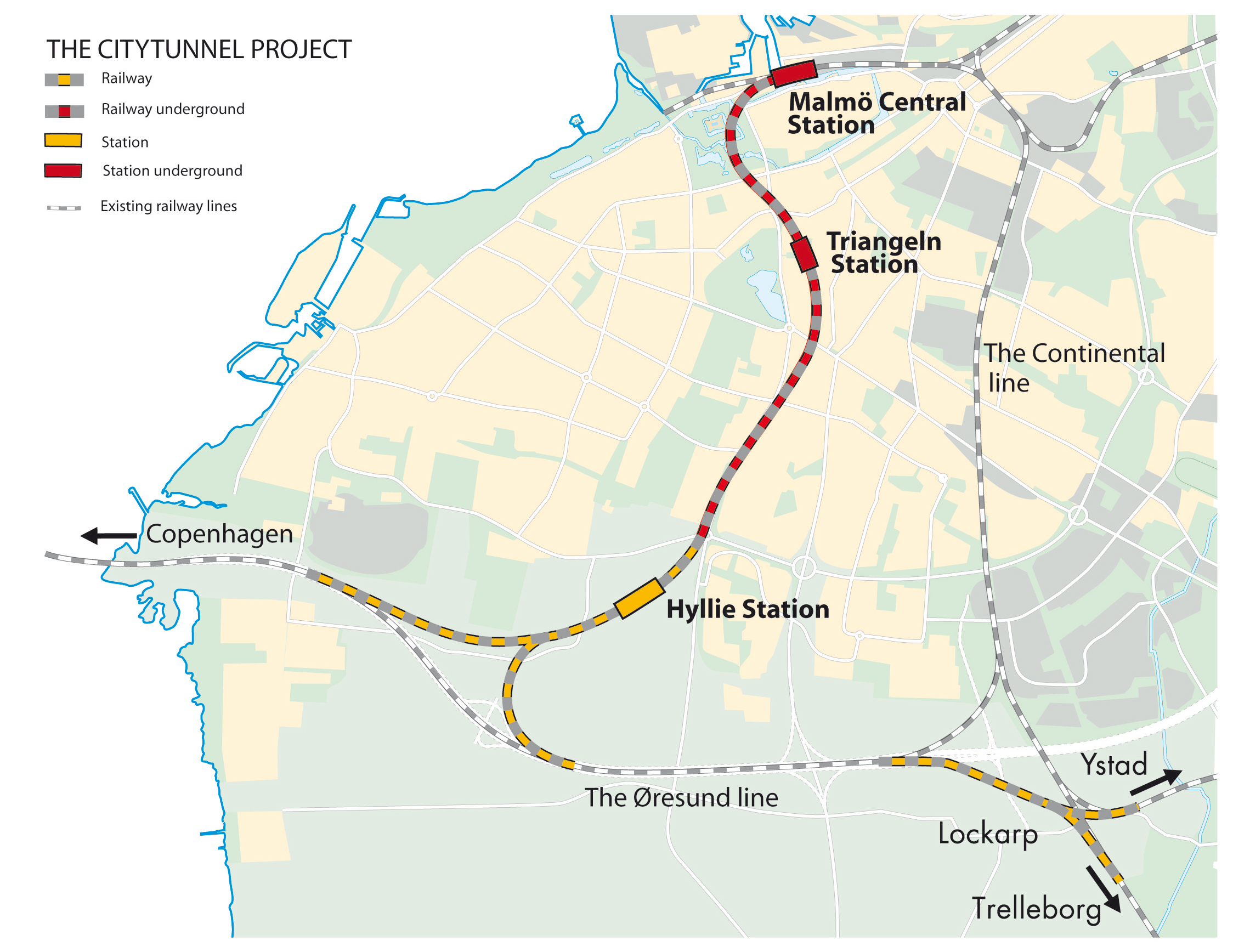
- Location of the tunnel and the new stations

Overview
- Line: Øresund Railway
- Location: Malmö, Sweden
- Status: Completed
- System: Swedish railways
- Start: Malmö C
- End: Hyllie
- No. of stations: 3

Operation
- Opened: 4 December 2010
- Owner: Trafikverket
- Character: Passenger trains

Technical
- Line length: 11 km (17 km incl. connections)
- Track length: 28 km
- No. of tracks: Double
- Track gauge: 1,435 mm (4 ft 8 1/2 in)
- Electrified: 15 kV 16.7 Hz AC

The City Tunnel (Swedish: Citytunneln) is an 11-kilometre (6.8 mi) rail link in Malmö, Sweden, running between Malmö Central Station (Malmö C) and the Öresund Bridge, of which six kilometres (3.7 mi) under Malmö city centre is in a tunnel, to increase capacity on the Skåne County network by changing Malmö C from a terminus to a through station. Including necessary connections to other railways it is 17 km (11 mi). It is a part of the Öresund Line to Copenhagen Central Station. The work was projected to cost 9.45 billion SEK. Construction began in March 2005, and the line was inaugurated by King Carl XVI Gustaf of Sweden on 4 December 2010. Revenue service commenced on 12 December 2010.

Unlike other dual track railways in Sweden, traffic travels on the right. The tracks switch sides in Arlöv around 5 km (3.1 mi) north-east of Malmö Central Station, at a flyover constructed separately.

== Background ==
Planning for a railway connection passing through Malmö to the proposed Öresund bridge began in 1991. The task of investigating technology and cost of several options was assigned to Svedab AB (Svensk-Danska Broförbindelsen). In 1995, the City Tunnel Consortium was formed, starting the design of the tunnel solution. The main purpose of the tunnel was to transform Malmö C from a terminal into a through station by building new underground platforms, enabling more rail traffic in Skåne County and across the bridge to Denmark, to create more stations in Malmö, to relieve Continental Line from passenger traffic, to expand the catchment area of cross-Öresund traffic and improve connections between places south of Malmö and Öresund trains. The opening of the new Triangeln underground station creates what will be one of the country's largest railway stations, with significantly reduced travel times from the region's cities to southern parts of central Malmö, including the large Malmö University hospital. Malmö thus now has two stations in the city center, of which Triangeln station has the most jobs and housing in its vicinity. A new station was also built in Hyllie, south of Malmö.

=== Construction ===
Construction commenced on 8 March 2005. Three major construction sites had been established, at Malmö C, Triangeln and Holma/Hyllie. By the end of 2006, another construction site had been opened in Lockarp, where connecting tracks to Ystad and Trelleborg were being built. The underground station at Malmö C was built in a 0.8 km (0.50 mi) long open trench which was then covered. To minimize traffic disruption, the extensive and time-consuming work was done in stages. In order to build Triangeln station, two 25 m (82 ft) deep vertical shafts were dug at the northern and southern part of the site, and the station was then milled out of the rock by a roadheader—a machine equipped with a rotating cutter head on a telescopic arm. The rock was then lined with concrete elements to finish the structure. Hyllie Station was built in an approximately 7 m (23 ft) deep shaft; the vault that covers the station is a distinct landmark in the Hyllie development area. The tunnel was mostly bored by two tunnel boring machines (TBMs). Underground drilling commenced in November 2006 and February 2007, respectively. On 25 March 2008, one of the TBMs achieved breakthrough at Malmö C, followed by the second TBM on 21 April. Work was completed in December 2010, six months ahead of schedule.

=== Finances ===
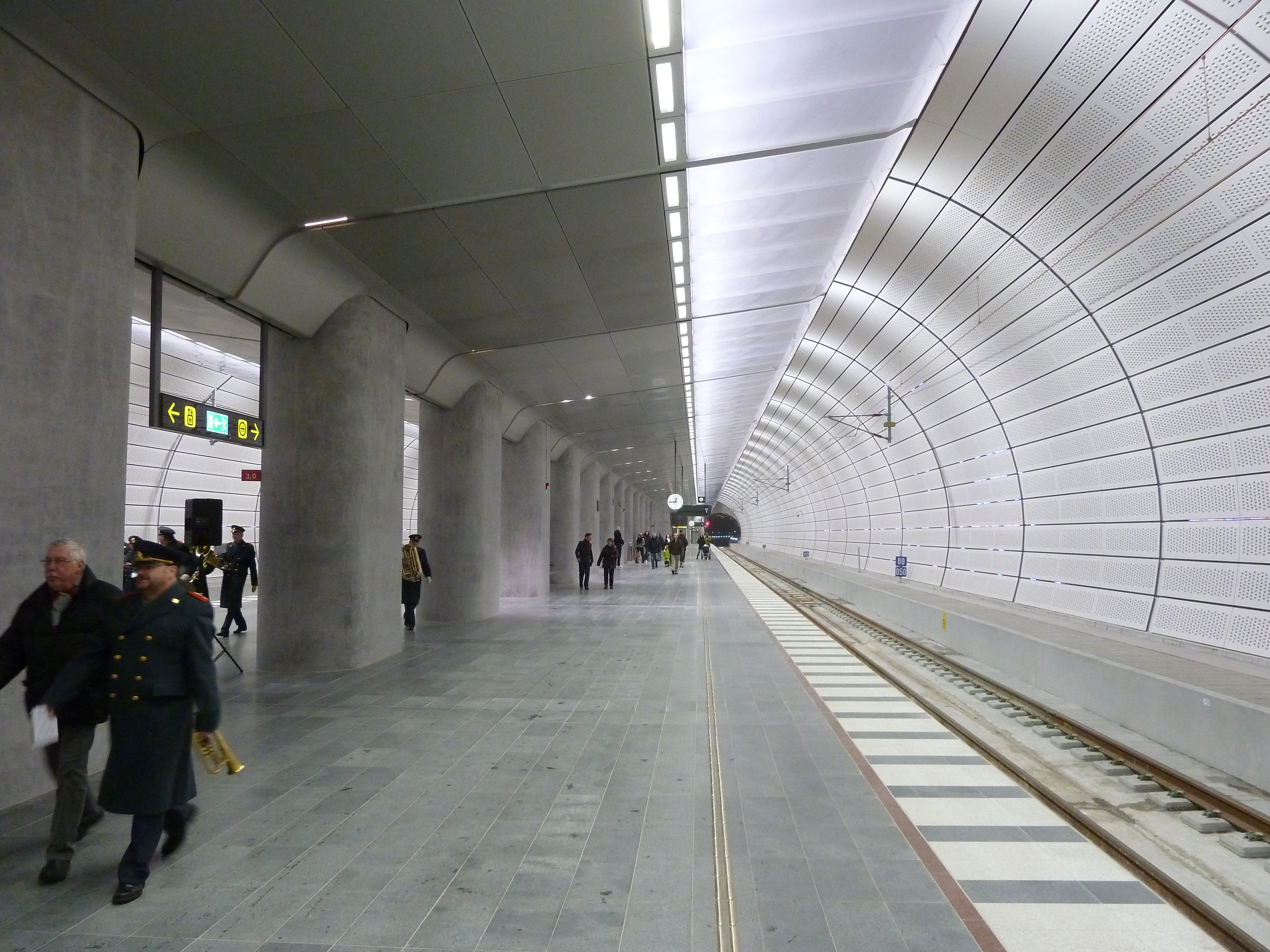
The platforms of Triangeln station during the opening week

According to a final estimate, presented on 30 November 2009, the cost of the City Tunnel will be 8.565 billion Swedish kronor (SEK) in 2001 prices, almost a billion SEK less than the budgeted 9.450 billion SEK established just before the start of construction in 2005, when the procurement of the large contracts and the comprehensive environmental assessment was completed. Following the latest cost estimate, the Swedish Transport Administration's share is about 6 billion SEK, Skåne County 800 million SEK and the City of Malmö more than a billion SEK. The European Union's contribution is 700 million SEK.

According to an economic analysis conducted at the Center for Transport Economics (CTEK), the tunnel will produce a result ranging from slightly negative to slightly positive; most likely, it will bear its own costs. According to the Swedish Transport Administration's own forecasts, the project will not be profitable. These calculations were carried out in 2001, and since the early 2000s there has been a sharp increase in local and regional train journeys, making calculations from 2001 highly unreliable. In April 2008 the Swedish Transport Administration revised its forecasts, stating that "the economic viability of many railway projects in the real world will exceed the previously estimated [sic]." The report was commissioned as part of the basis for infrastructure investment in the transport sector from 2010 to 2021. According to a political principle established in Sweden during recent years, construction projects in areas where construction is overly expensive does not need to be fully economically viable. In such cases, a lower cost estimate can be used in the calculation, since it is not politically desirable for certain metropolitan areas to be neglected merely because of the high cost associated with construction in these areas. Without such a principle, it would not have been possible to build the City Tunnel, Södra länken, Götatunneln and other upcoming city projects.

== Operation ==
Running time between Malmö C and Copenhagen Central Stations was reduced from 35 to 33 minutes, since the savings gained by the shorter route are partly offset by the extra stop at Triangeln station. Maximum time savings will be 15–25 minutes for trips to and from Triangeln, a central location in Malmö. From locations north of Malmö, travel times were reduced by approximately 10 minutes for journeys to Copenhagen, since trains no longer have to reverse at Malmö C. The full potential of the tunnel wasn't realized until the line between Lund and Malmö was expanded to four tracks, a project completed in 2023.

=== Route ===
The railway starts at a new underground station section built beneath Malmö C, called Malmö C Nedre (Lower). From there, the railway runs in a tunnel to the new Triangeln underground station, 25 meters underground in central Malmö. It then turns south until it reaches Holma, and continues in an open shaft to the new station at Hyllie, a new development area south of the city centre. Here two lines branch off: one west to the Öresund Railway Line, the other (opened in August 2011) to the Ystad and Trelleborg (Kontinentalbanan) lines.

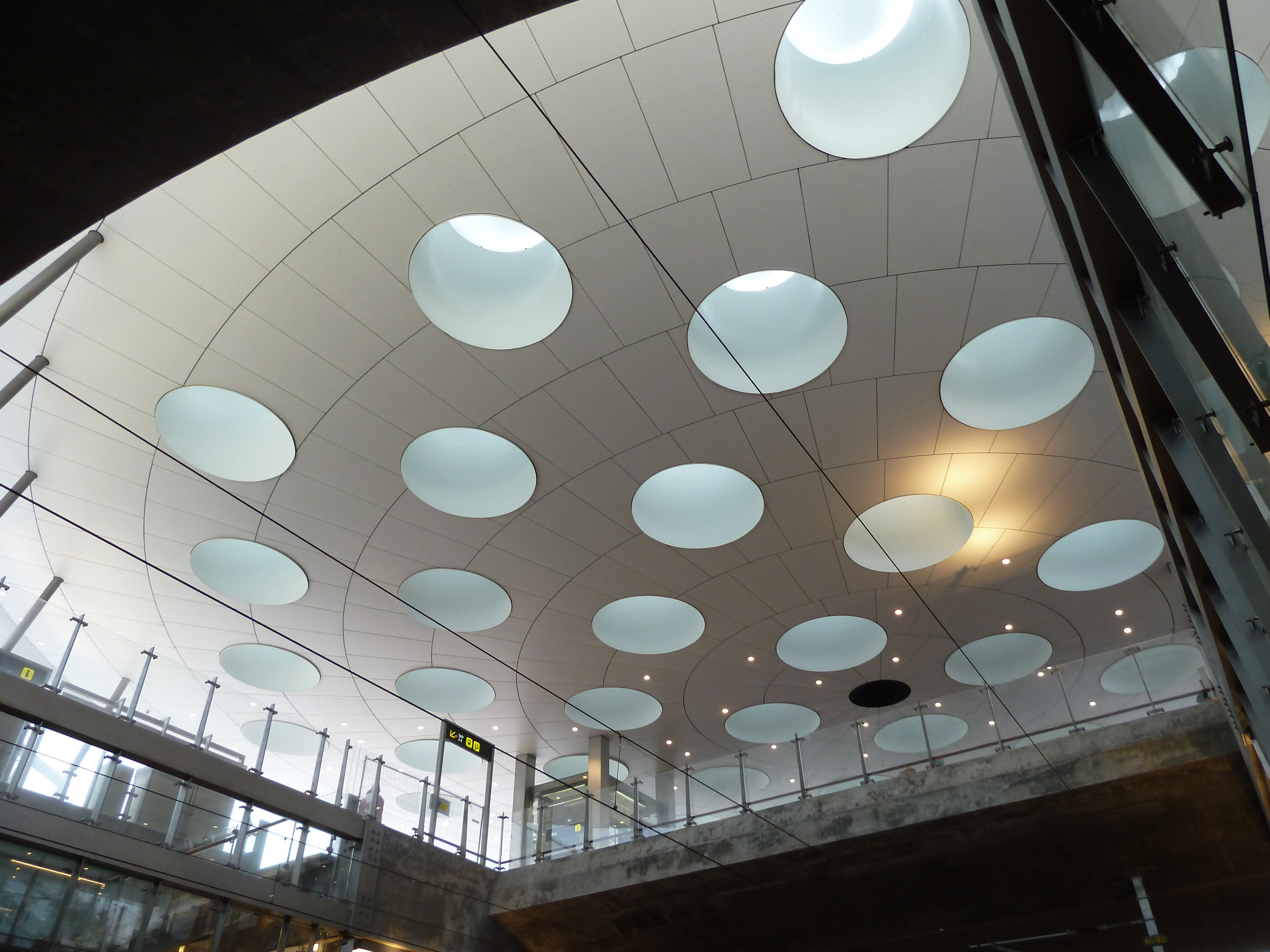
The signature roof of Hylie station south of the tunnel

- Northern end: 55.610317°N 13.006654°E
- Central lower station: 55.609736°N 13.000238°E
- Triangeln station: 55.594643°N 13.000367°E
- Southern end: 55.567888°N 12.985067°E
- Hyllie station: 55.560923°N 12.977943°E

=== Stations ===
- Malmö C
- Triangeln
- Hyllie

=== Signalling ===
Trains in the City Tunnel will be controlled by the new ERTMS signalling system, a new European standard simplifying operations across national borders. Due to delays in equipment installation for integration between ERTMS and the older Swedish and (especially) Danish systems, there is a temporary arrangement using ATC. There is currently no set date for when the switch to ERTMS will be done.

== Images ==
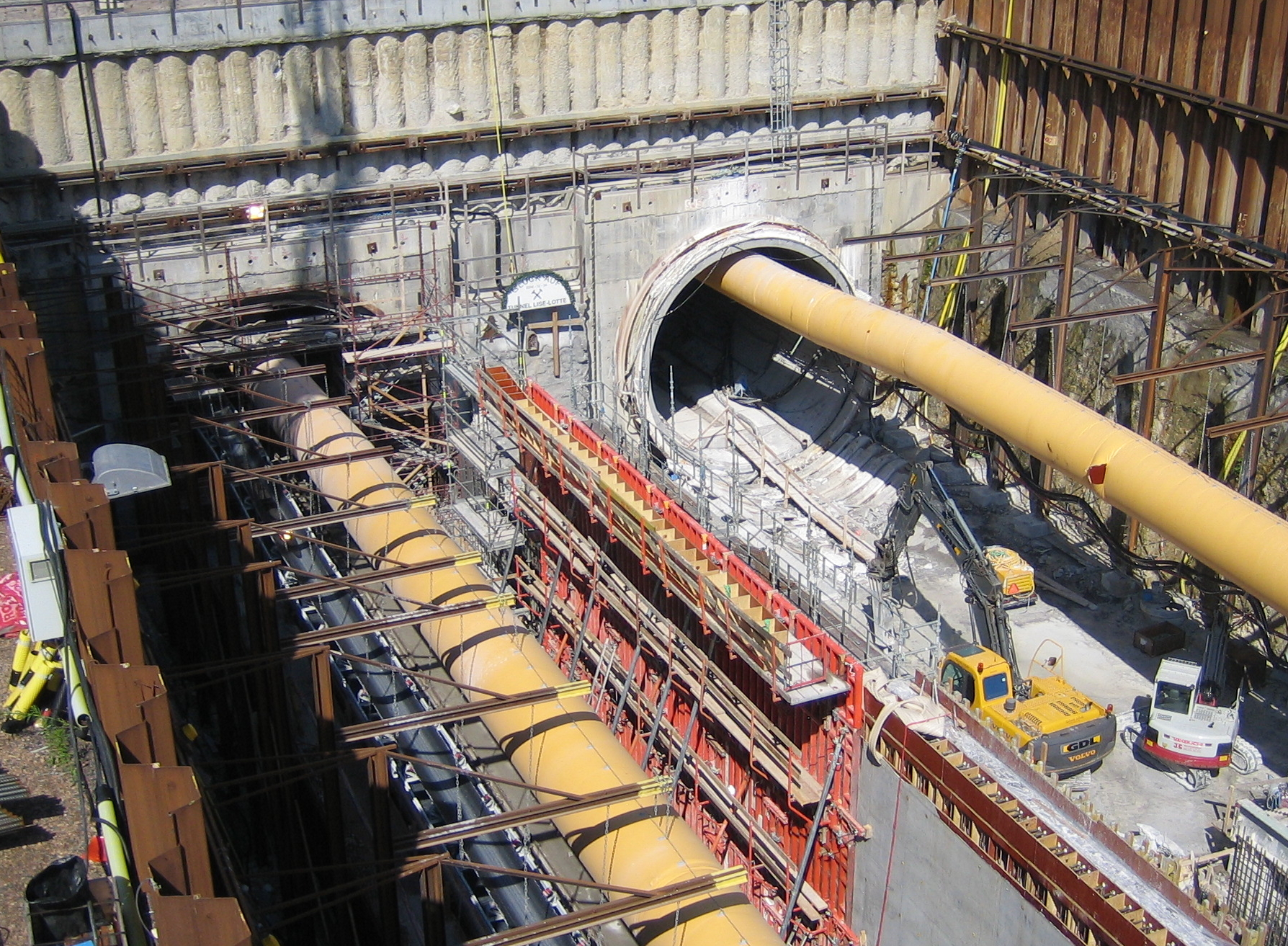
Holma

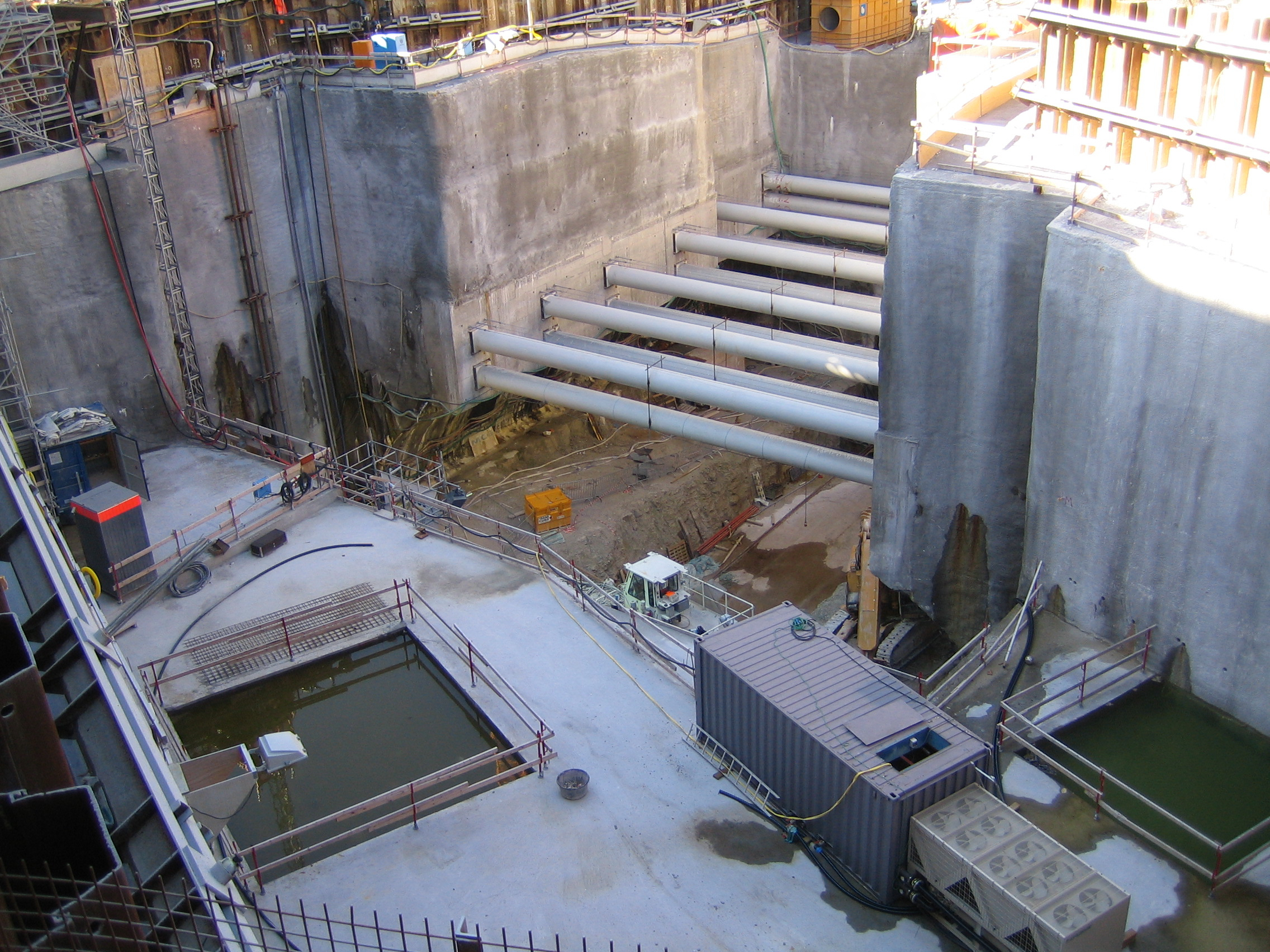
Triangeln

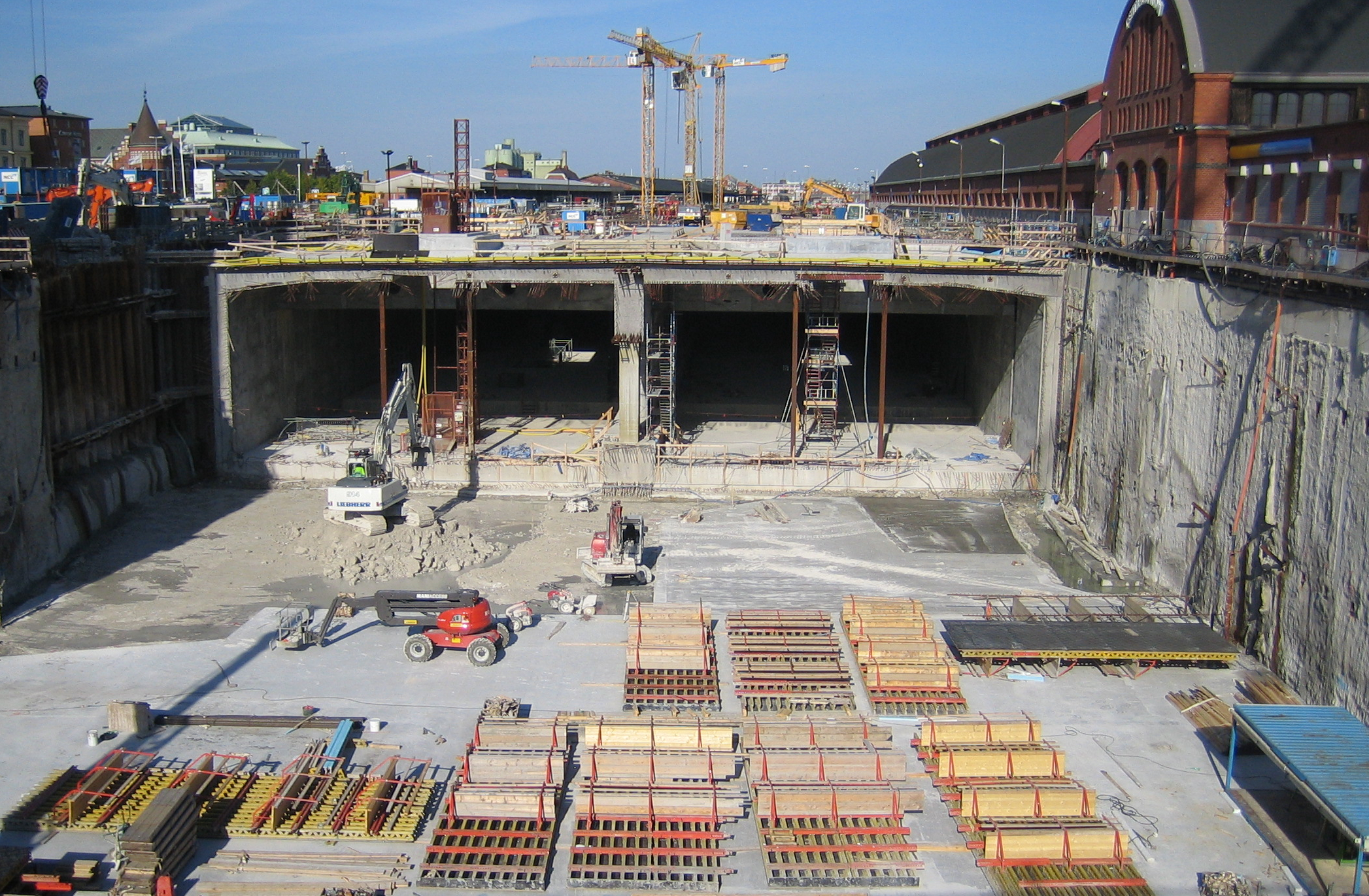
Near Malmö C
