= Triangeln station =

Railway station in Malmö, Sweden

Triangeln Station
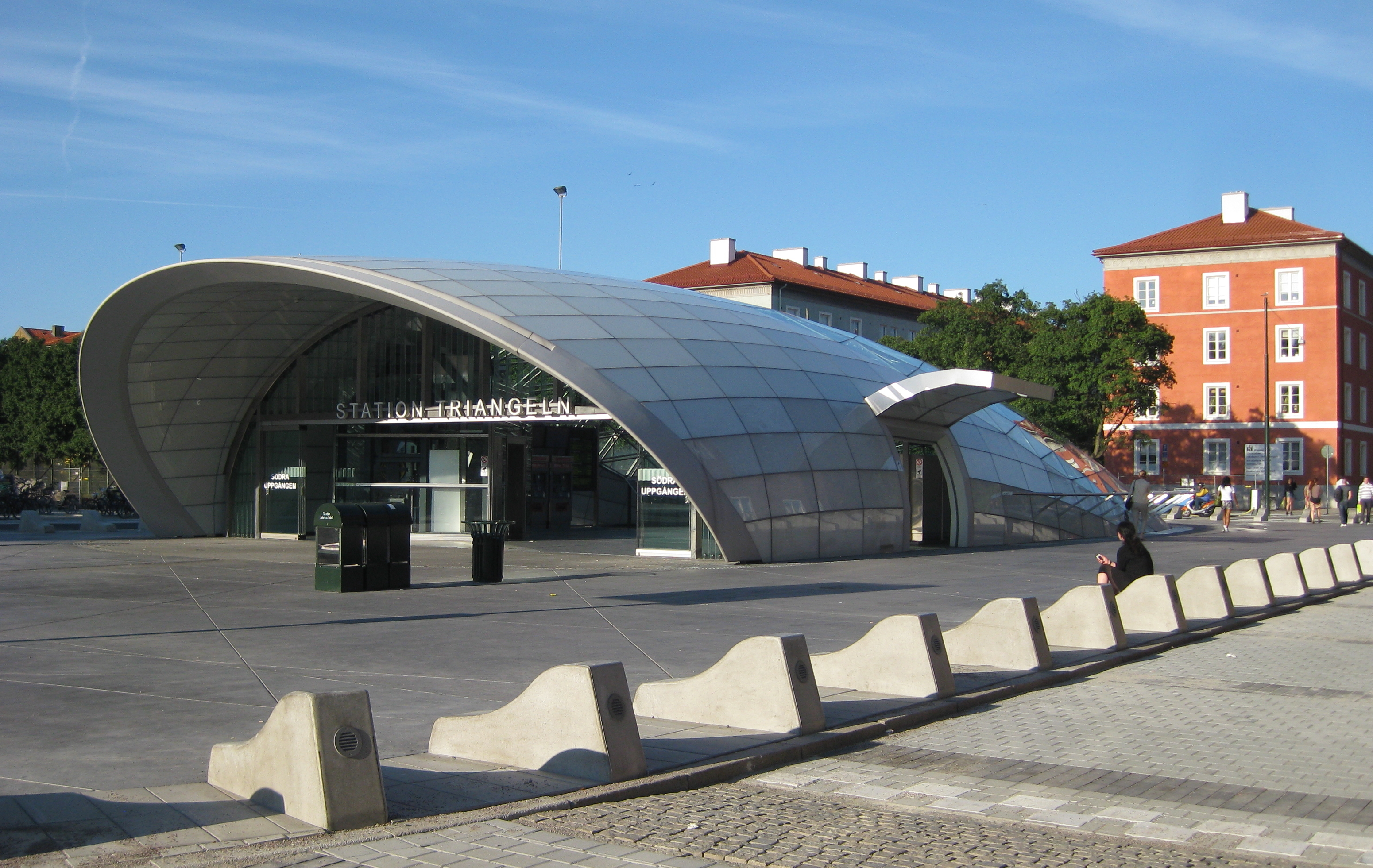
- Southern entrance

General information
- Location: Malmö; Sweden
- Coordinates: 55.5920°N 13.0019°E
- Operator: Pågatåg; Oresundtrain
- Line: Oresundtrain
- Platforms: 1 island platform
- Tracks: 2

Construction
- Structure type: Underground
- Accessible: Yes

History
- Opened: December 2010

Passengers
- 22 800 per weekday (2016)

Services
Preceding station	Øresundståg	Following station
Hyllie towards Østerport	Copenhagen–Lund Øresundståg	Malmö C towards Lund C
Hyllie towards Østerport	Copenhagen–Gothenburg Øresundståg	Malmö C towards Göteborg C
Hyllie towards Østerport	Copenhagen–Kalmar Øresundståg	Malmö C towards Kalmar C
Hyllie towards Østerport	Copenhagen–Karlskrona Øresundståg	Malmö C towards Karlskrona C
Preceding station	Pågatågen	Following station
Hyllie Terminus	Line 2A	Malmö C towards Helsingborg C
Hyllie Terminus	Line 3	Malmö C towards Helsingborg C
Hyllie Terminus	Line 4	Malmö C towards Kristianstad C
Hyllie towards Simrishamn	Line 6	Malmö C towards Lund C
Hyllie Terminus	Line 8	Malmö C towards Åstorp
Hyllie towards Trelleborg	Line 9	Malmö C towards Lund C
Hyllie towards Malmö C	Line 11	Malmö C towards Kävlinge
Location

Triangeln station (Swedish: Triangeln/Trianglens station) is an underground railway station in Malmö, Sweden. It is located in central Malmö, close to St. John's Church and to Triangeln (literally 'The Triangle') square, with the neighbourhoods Möllevången and Pildammsparken in its vicinity. The station opened in December 2010 as a part of the newly built Citytunneln along with Hyllie railway station and a new underground part of Malmö Central Station.

== Gallery ==
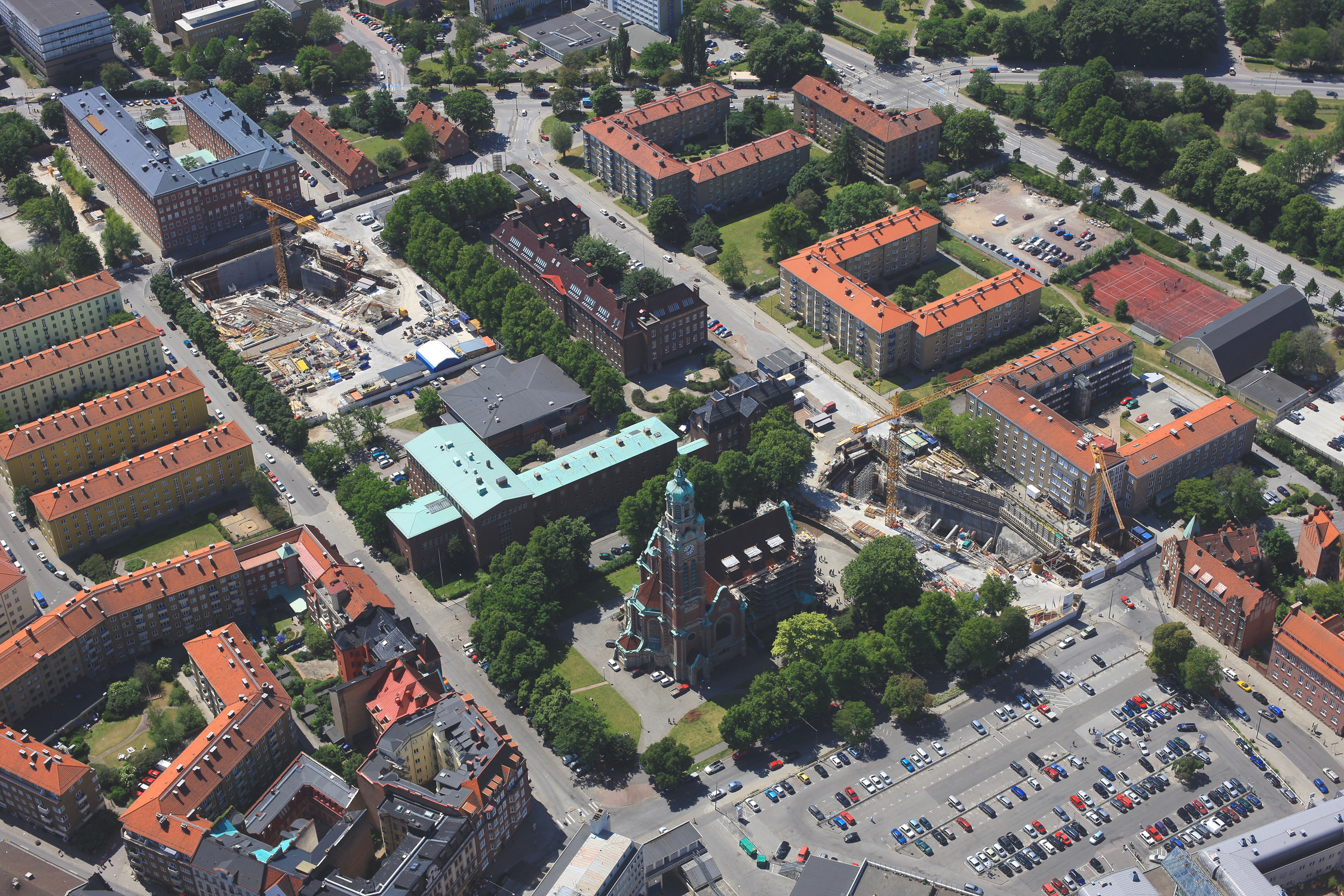
Triangeln station under construction, 2008

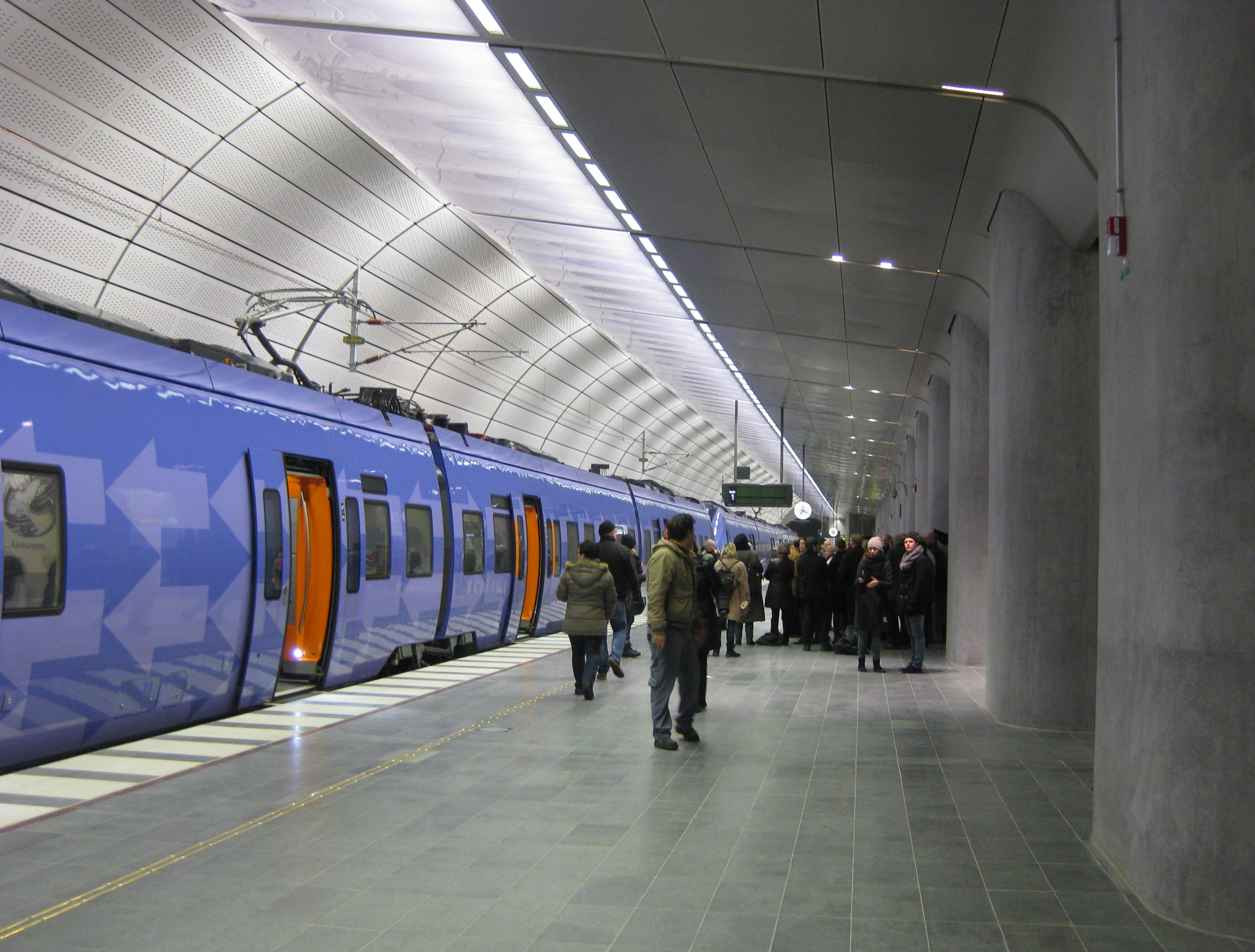
Station platform

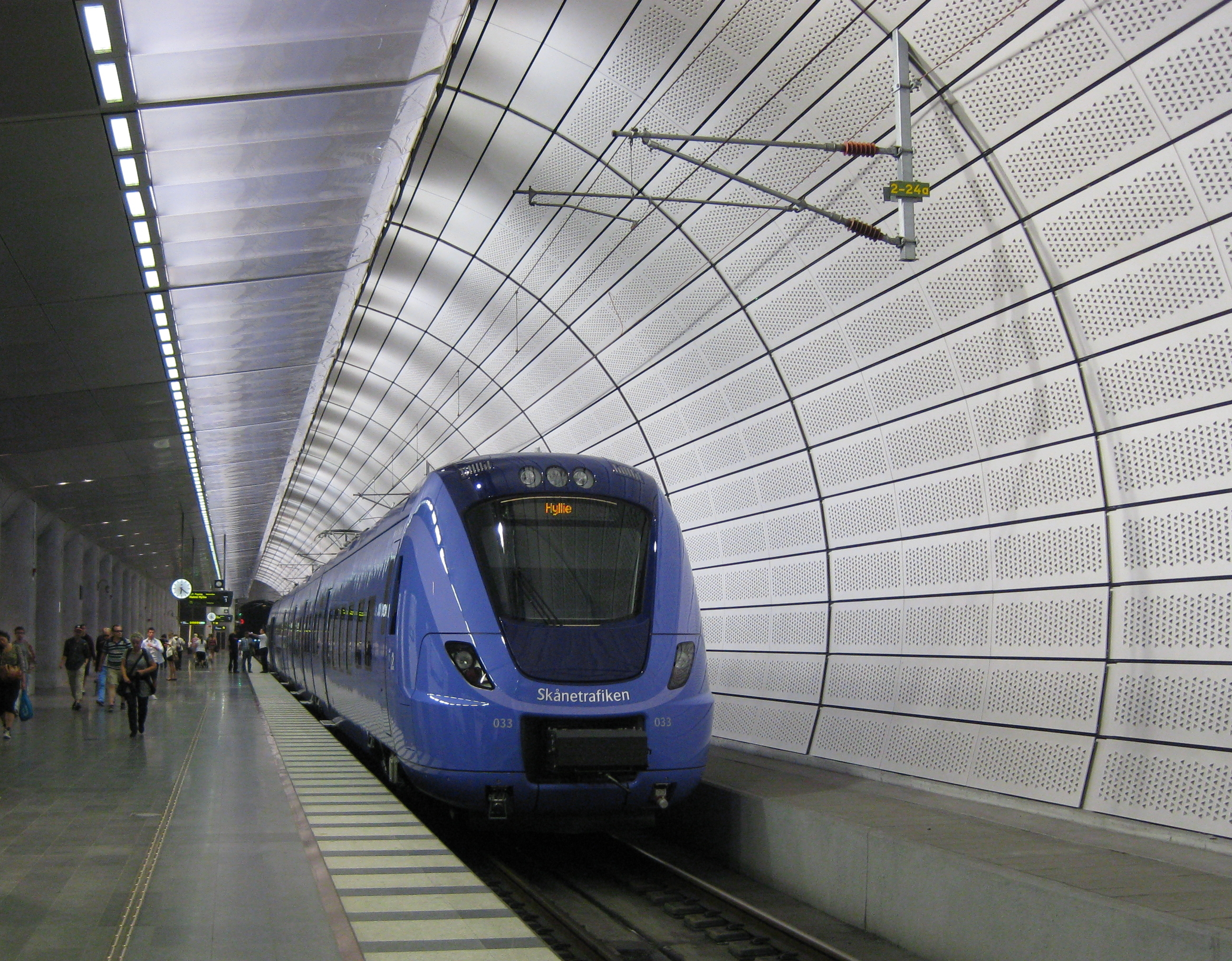
Pågatåg at the station

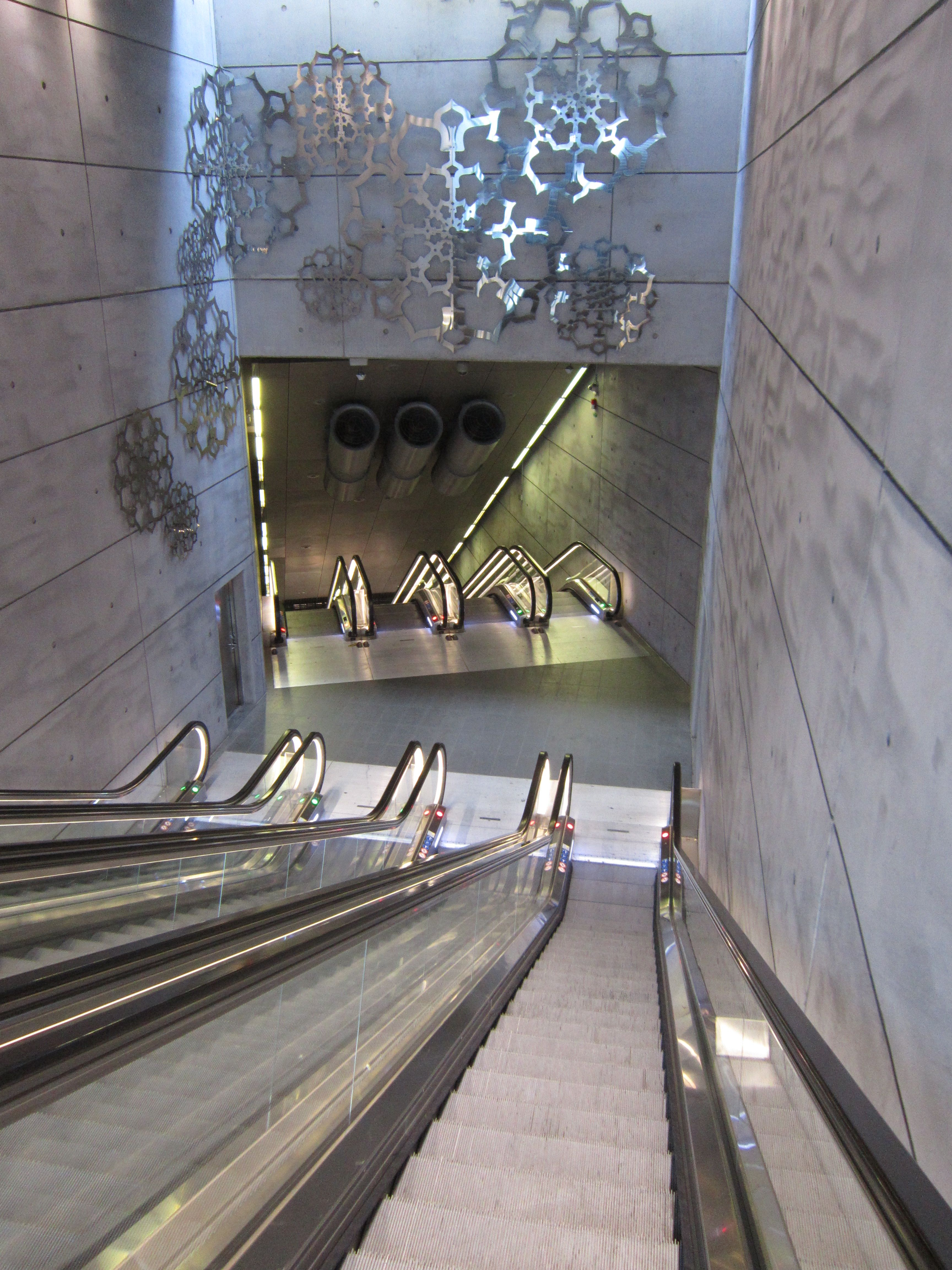
North entrance escalators

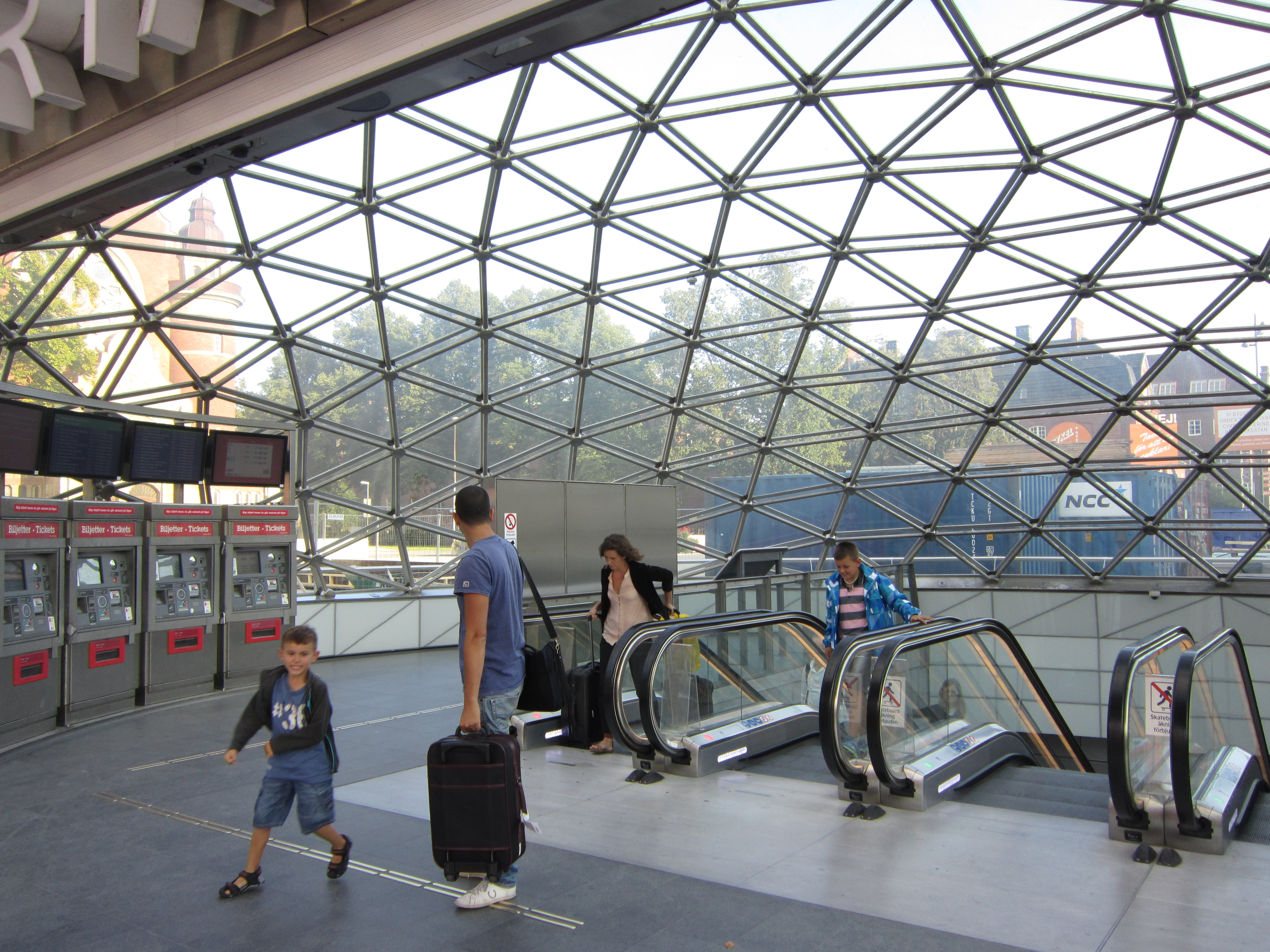
North entrance hall
