= Øresundståg =

Railway network in Denmark and Sweden

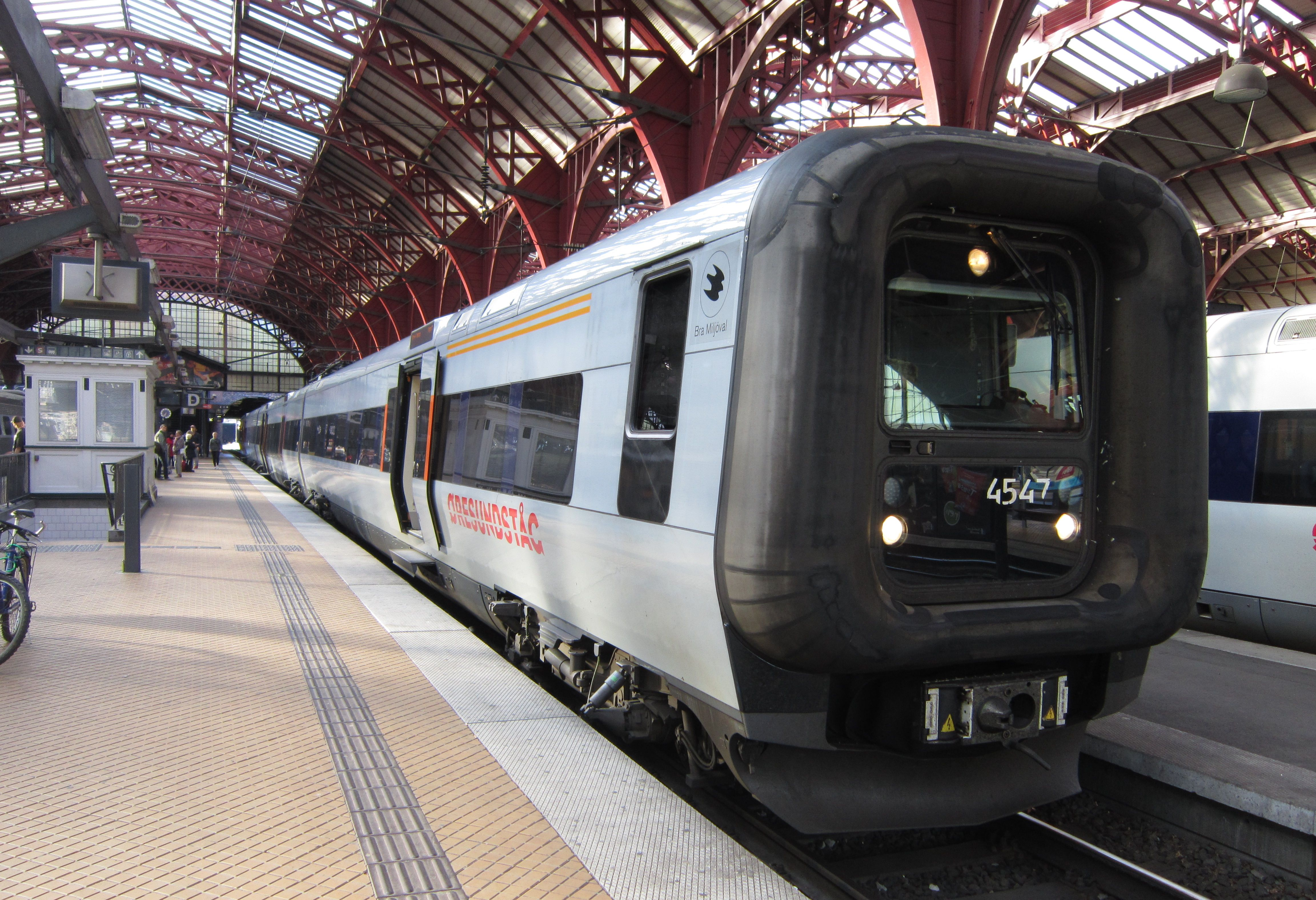
- An Øresundståg train at Copenhagen Central Station

Overview
- Service type: Cross-border
- Status: Regional train
- Locale: Øresund Region, Southern Sweden
- Predecessor: Ferry services
- First service: 2 July 2000
- Current operator: VR Sverige
- Former operators: SJ Öresund; Transdev
- Website: https://www.oresundstag.se/en

Route
- Termini: Copenhagen Østerport; Gothenburg C, Kalmar C, Karlskrona C

Technical
- Rolling stock: X31K & X32K / ET
- Track gauge: 1,435 mm (4 ft 8 1/2 in) standard gauge
- Operating speed: 180 km/h (112 mph)
- Track owners: Trafikverket, Banedanmark
- Rake maintenance: Amager (Denmark); Hässleholm (Sweden)

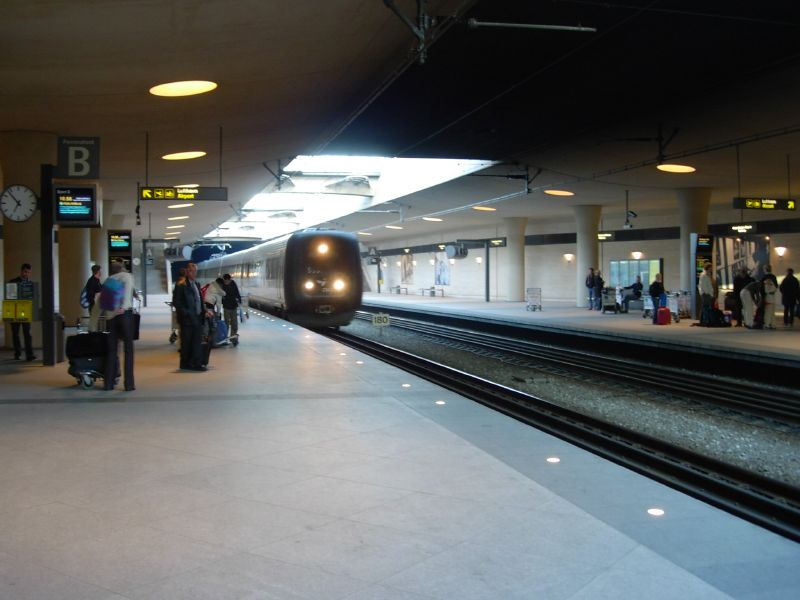
Copenhagen Airport is also a stop of the Øresund Line

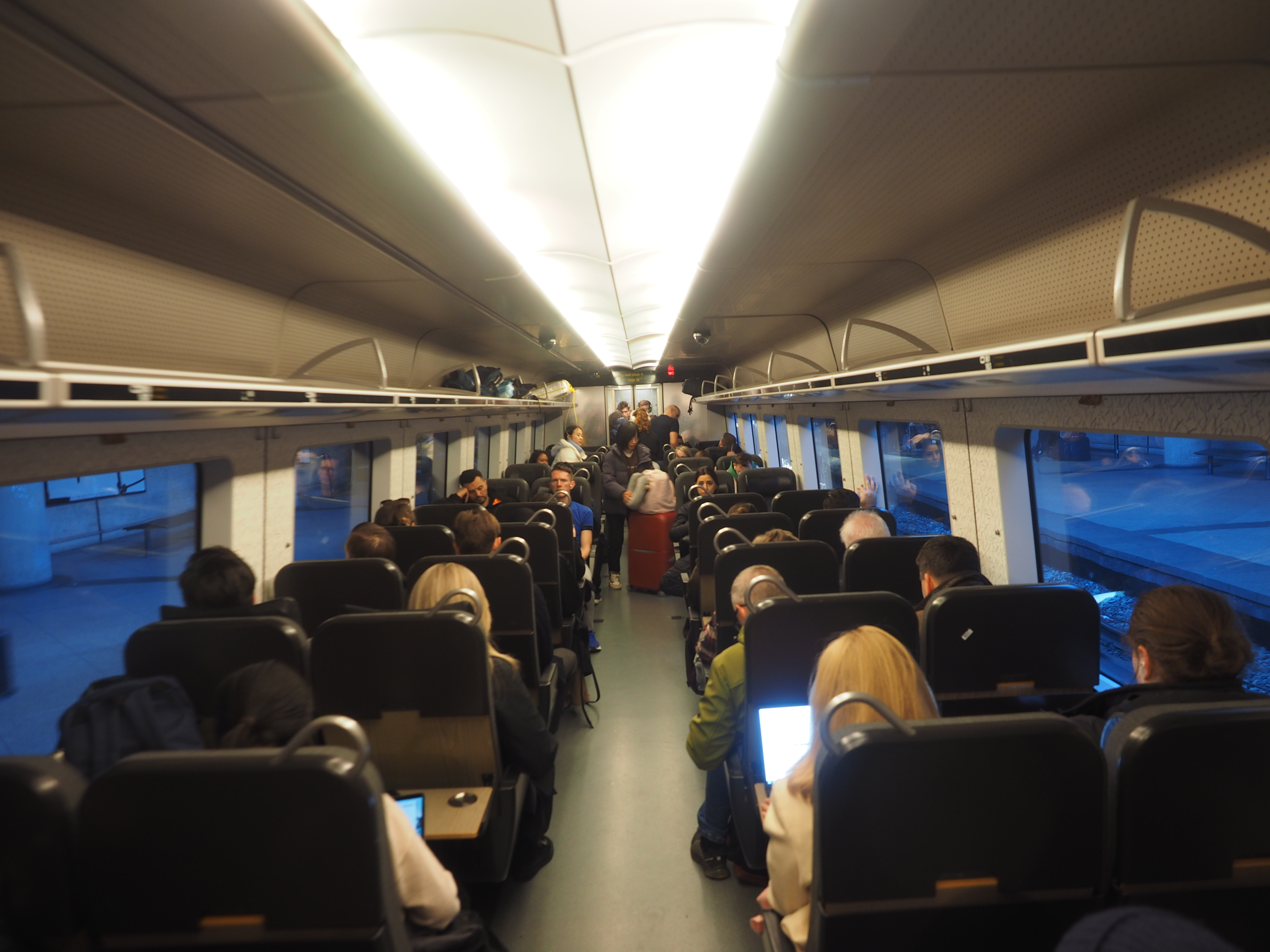
Interior of a refurbished Øresundståg train from Denmark to Sweden

Øresundståg or Öresundståg(Danish: [ˈøːɐsɔnsˌtsʰɔˀw], Swedish: [œrɛˈsɵ̂nːdsˌtoːɡ]) is a cross-border regional passenger train network linking Denmark and Sweden. It operates across the Øresund Bridge, connecting Copenhagen with Malmö and forming a wider regional rail system serving southern Sweden, with services extending as far as Gothenburg and Kalmar.

The service began on 1 July 2000 in connection with the opening of the Øresund Bridge, initially operating primarily between Malmö and Copenhagen before expanding into a broader cross-border regional network. As of the 2026, approximately half a million journeys are made on the network each week.

From Copenhagen Østerport, the network extends to regional routes within the six southern Swedish counties of Scania, Halland, Västra Götaland, Blekinge, Kalmar and Kronoberg.

Until 2022, the system was a binational Danish-Swedish cooperation, after which ownership and responsibility were consolidated under Swedish regional authorities with coordination managed by Öresundståg AB. As of 2026, train operations and maintenance are contracted to VR Sverige.

The name Øresundståg is a hybrid of the Danish Øresundstog and the Swedish Öresundståg, both meaning "Øresund train". The rolling stock, also known as Class ET in Denmark and X31K in Sweden, consists of electric multiple-unit train sets belonging to the Flexliner family.

== Operations ==
Four trains per hour cross the Øresund Bridge each way. Trains run at 15-minute intervals between Østerport via Copenhagen in Denmark to Malmö and Lund in southern Sweden, increasing to six trains per hour during rush hours. From Lund, the trains continue in three directions:

- 1 train per hour to Kalmar via Hässleholm;
- 1 train per hour to Karlskrona via Hässleholm;
- 2 trains per hour to Helsingborg, of which one continues further to Gothenburg.

After midnight, traffic is reduced to one hourly train between Østerport in Copenhagen and Lund (the train between 01:00 AM and 02:00 AM starts from Copenhagen H).

Each train consists of up to three 79-metre-long units coupled together, each with 229 seats, providing a capacity of max 4122 seats per hour. This has turned out to be insufficient, as differences in salaries and house prices between Copenhagen and Malmö have resulted in an unexpected increase of cross-border commuting.

The trains cannot be lengthened because of platform length constraints. And increasing frequency beyond six trains per hour is not possible because there are only two platform tracks to share with other trains at the stations Nørreport, Ørestad, Copenhagen Airport and Triangeln. Increasingly, people have to stand during rush hours, into Copenhagen in the morning and towards Malmö in the afternoon, which beside the inconvenience also raises safety concerns.

The network at its peak covered 854 kilometres (531 mi) of railway. In Denmark, the trains run on the Boulevard Line and the Øresund Line, between Østerport and the Airport in 10-minute frequency. In Sweden, they run through the Malmö City Tunnel, and on the Southern Main Line to Lund. From Lund, most Øresundståg services continue to either Gothenburg, Kalmar, or Karlskrona, using the West Coast Line, the Southern Main Line, the Coast-to-Coast Line or the Blekinge Coast Line.

Passengers mostly encounter Swedish staff on the trains over the Øresund Bridge, but before 2023 there could be either Danish and Swedish staff. For travel inside one of the Swedish counties or inside Denmark, the local traffic authority tickets are used. For travel from Sweden to Denmark tickets can be purchased from the Swedish regional transit authorities and ticket sales channels which are part of the Resplus system, such as SJ.

Until December 2020, the trains were operated by Transdev in Sweden and by DSB in Denmark. In December 2020, SJ Öresund took over the operations in Sweden. Due to an early termination of the contract with SJ as a result of differences in opinion regarding conditions for the rolling stock maintenance, Transdev took over as a temporary operator for both operations in Denmark and Sweden in December 2022. VR Sverige took over operations in December 2025.

On 11 December 2022 the Danish authorities left the Øresundståg operations, and from that time it is operated with Swedish responsibility only. At the same time Øresundståg stopped operating the route between Østerport and Helsingør, which was taken over by DSB domestic trains.

=== Operation ===
On 27 June 2007 it was decided that DSBFirst was to assume responsibility from 2009 for the running of all Øresundståg services on the Øresund Line and connected destinations. DSBFirst started operations on 11 January 2009. In 2011, the Danish and Swedish ministries of transport instructed DSBFirst Sweden to cease operating the Swedish part of the service from 10 December 2011 Veolia Transport took over the Swedish side and DSBFirst Denmark's services passed to DSB Øresund. The Øresundståg operation has suffered from financial problems as well as delays and cancelled trains on both the Danish and Swedish part of its network, notably during the 2010 winter.

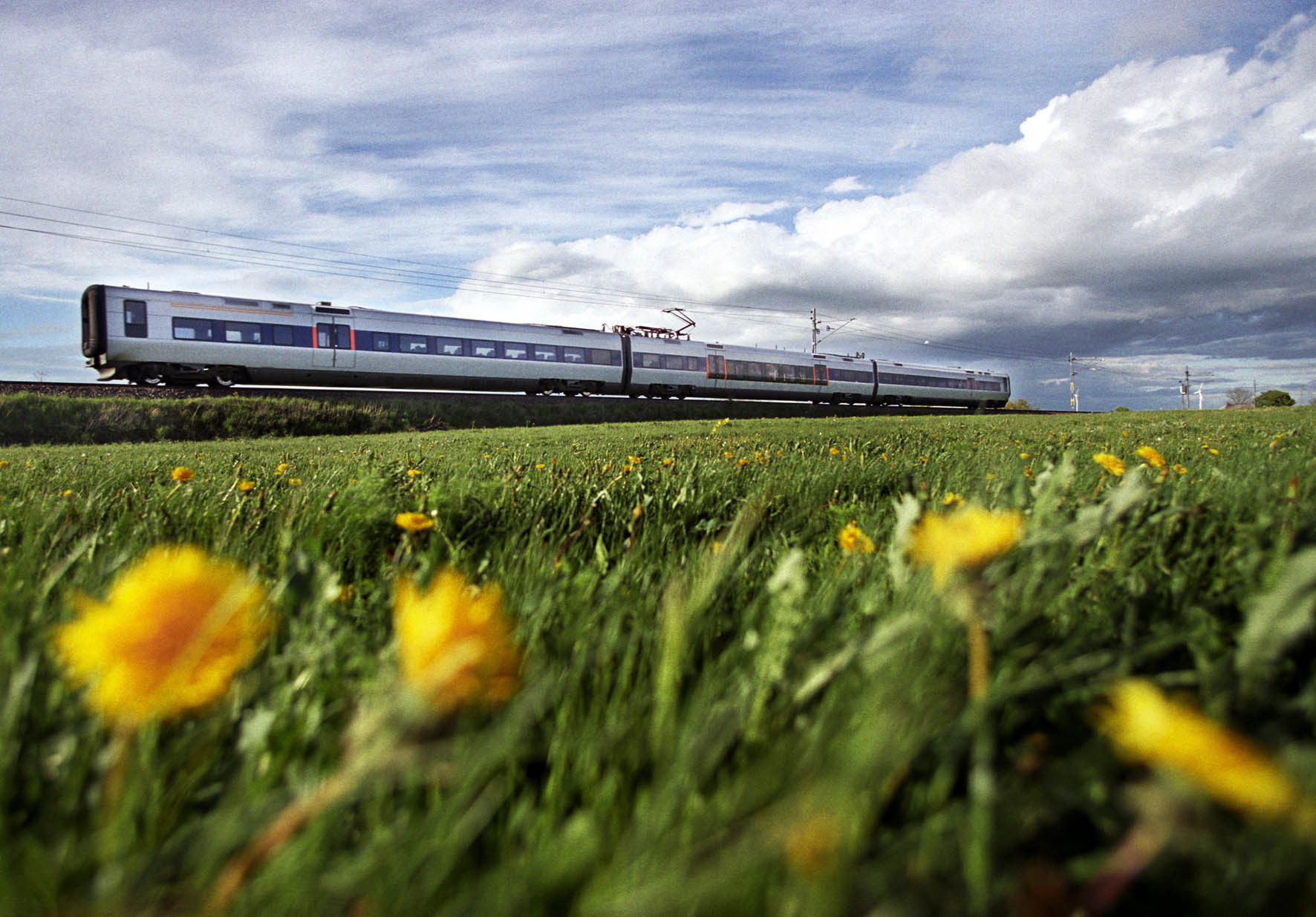
Unrefurbished Öresundståg passes a field in Skåne in May 2014

On the Danish side the trains stop often, about every 4 km, like a commuter train. On the Swedish side the trains stop much less often, more like inter-city trains, and they reach stations about 300 km from Copenhagen, such as Gothenburg, Kalmar and Karlskrona. Most travellers use it like a regional train for work commuting and similar shorter journeys, and local monthly passes are valid on the train.

The combination of routes of an inter-city nature in Sweden with commuter-like routes in Denmark is often a source of trouble. The long-distance trains from Sweden often accumulate delays during the long journey. But delays cause trouble to commuter passengers having fixed work hours and not wishing to add long margins, since they travel every day. Therefore, some stand-by trains were ready at Kastrup that run to Helsingør if the train from Sweden was delayed. In these circumstances the train from Sweden terminated early and did not continue to Helsingør.

Because of the complexity involved in the Øresundståg operation and the result of delays on the Danish side of the network, the decision was taken to split the operations in December 2021. The Danish services are now tendered by the Danish authorities, while Skånetrafiken will be responsible for the tendering process for the international and Swedish services. The trains to Helsingør now start at Holbæk or Næstved.

On 10 December 2023 a fourth circulation of Øresundståg was started between Helsingborg and Østerport due to demand and enabled by the opening of a new platform in Helsingborg, so that trains go once per 15 minutes instead of once per 20 minutes most of the day.

== Competitors ==
Between Gothenburg and Malmö (until 2012 to Copenhagen, but not to Helsingør), SJ AB (the Swedish national railway) operates competing trains. From 2009 they have different tickets compared to the Øresundståg services. SJ runs X2000 trains via Hässleholm, and from 2009 to 2011 SJ ran intercity IC3 (X31) trains using via Helsingborg. Different tickets are needed. There was a similar situation with DSB's "Intercity Bornholm" trains to Ystad, which did not accept Øresundståg tickets despite the "Øresundstog" rolling stock used.

== ID checks from Denmark to Sweden ==
In response to the 2015 European migrant crisis the Swedish government mandated ID checks on all trains coming from Denmark from December 2015. As checks performed by the Swedish police took up to 20 minutes per train, timetables were severely disrupted. Beginning on 4 January 2016, transport operators would be fined if any improperly documented people were found to be brought into Sweden. As a result, DSB restructured the timetable, constructed a fence between the platforms at Copenhagen Airport station, and introduced its own ID checks in order to gain entrance to the Malmö-bound platform at CPH Airport station. The frequency of trains across the bridge had been reduced to a maximum of 3 tph. Apart from the reduced frequency, services from Sweden to Denmark ran as usual to Helsingør during the day and Østerport in the evenings, with no ID checks entering Denmark. Since 4 May 2017 the line had changed to perform ID checks only at Malmö Hyllie station for trains travelling to Sweden.

As of 2023, frequency of 6 trains per hour during rush hour had resumed, and trains are timetabled to wait 6 minutes at Malmö Hyllie where the Swedish police check ID of alighting passengers.

== Rolling stock ==
=== ET / X31K & X32K ===
X31
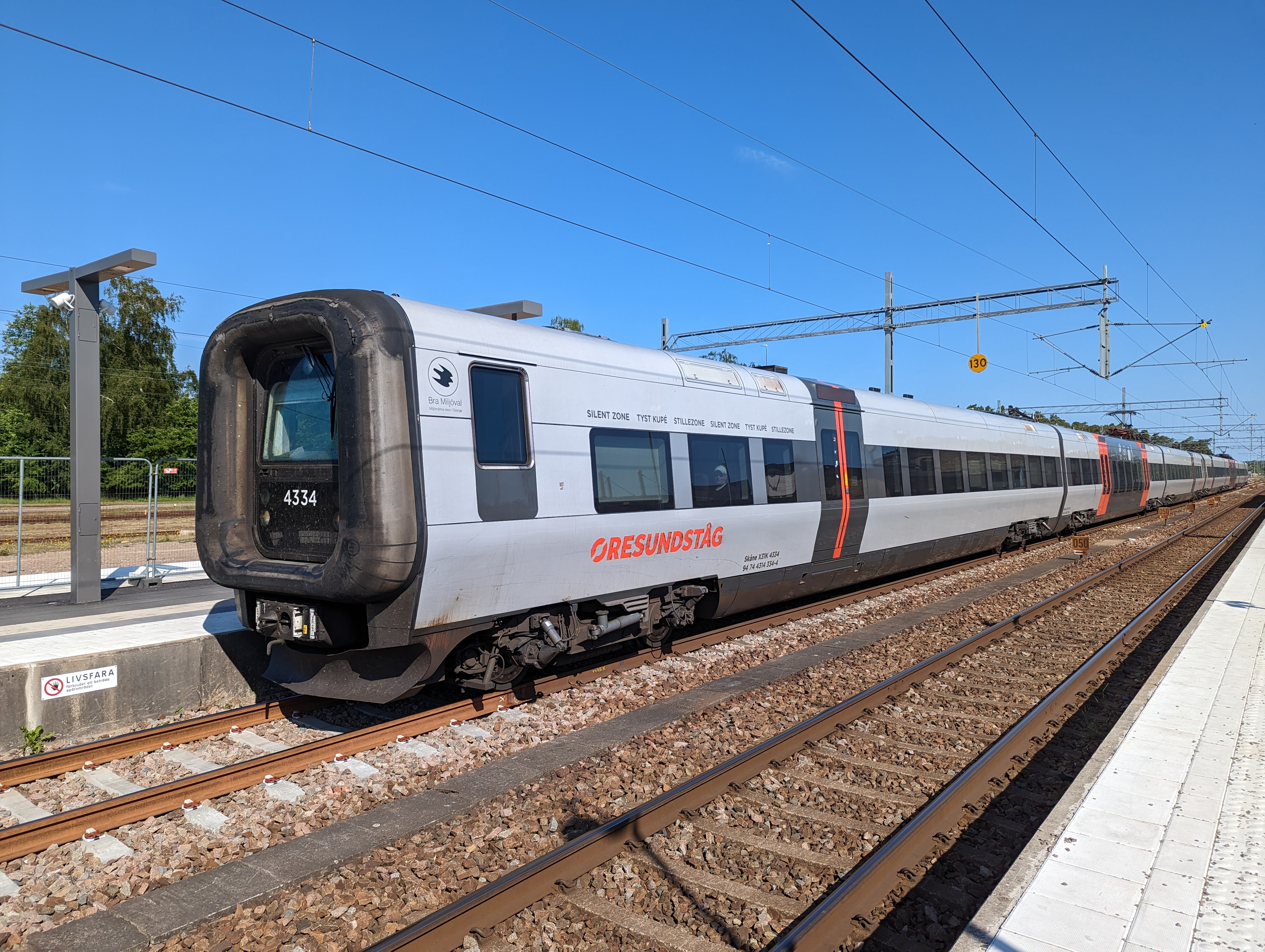
- A refurbished X31 at Ängelholms station.
- Stock type: Electric multiple unit
- In service: 2000–present
- Manufacturer: Adtranz/Bombardier Transportation
- Family name: Flexliner
- Constructed: 1999–2012
- Number built: 111 total, 104 X31K, 7 X32K
- Fleet numbers: 4301-4342, 4350-4411 (X31K/ET), 4343-4349 (X32K)
- Capacity: 229 seats
- Owners: Blekinge; Halland; Kronoberg; Skåne; Kalmar; Västtrafik
- Operator: VR Sverige for Øresundståg
- Depot: Hässleholmsdepån
- Lines served: Västkustbanan; Södra stambanan; Citytunneln Öresundsbanan; Kust till kust-banan; Blekinge kustbana

Specifications
- Doors: four doors per carriage 1-2-1 in a configuration
- Maximum speed: 180 km/h (110 mph)
- Weight: 156 tonnes
- UIC classification: Bo′Bo′+2′2′+Bo′Bo′
- Track gauge: 1,435 mm (4 ft 8 1/2 in) standard gauge

X31 is an electric multiple unit made by Bombardier Transportation. Owned collectively by the regional transit organisation of Blekinge, Halland, Kronoberg, Skåne, Kalmar och Västra Götaland as well as leasing company Transitio, and used on the entirety of the Øresundståg network. Mainly in Sweden but also on the Danish railway network with regular services running to and from Copenhagen Central Station and Østerport railway station.

The first 67 units were built at Kalmar Verkstad before the production line was moved to Germany where the rest of the 111 train sets were made. The last train was delivered to Transito in 2012 and the production line has since then been closed.

== Services ==
=== Current ===
The trains are currently operated on the Øresundståg network in the Øresund Region and the surrounding area.

=== Former ===
Formerly used by DSB on their services Copenhagen-Ystad called InterCity Bornholm that connected to the BornholmerFærgen services. It was also used to operate regional services on Sjælland and on the Kystbanen. This services ended and DSB sold their ten trains designated DSB ET to Skånetrafiken. SJ also operated Intercity services on Västkustbanan. This service ended in 2011. The SJ units were equipped with a bistro, and the same seating as the X2000 trains. The bistro and seats were removed after the service ended.

== Design ==
A X31 train has three cars and five units can be coupled together. Each unit is 79 metres long and weighs 156 tonnes. A two class system is employed with a total of 229 seats of which 20 are in first class. The bodies are 297 cm in width and is built using stainless steel, Different from other Flexliner family trains made of aluminium. When coupled together the fronts are folded away to provide a full width gangway The front ends are also used as an emergency exit in the Drogden tunnel in which it is mandatory. The train is also designed with an emergency brake override to comply with Citytunneln regulation.

To work with the differences in Swedish and Danish power systems the train is able to swap voltages and regularly does so on the island of Peberholm. It is also equipped with both Swedish and Danish ATC.

=== Refurbishment ===
As the larger part of the fleet of trains were over 15 years old, Øresundståg announced a refurbishment of the fleet would take place. As part of this refurbishment the seats received a makeover with new fabric as well as a new luggage rack in first class, the toilets were also replaced. New flooring and a wheelchair accessible area was installed. The exterior also received a makeover with new paint and decals.

The total for the renovation came to 51 millions SEK and was paid for by the operators of the trains Blekinge, Halland, Kronoberg, Skåne, Kalmar, Västra Götaland and DSB. The renovation took place at the depot in Tillberga, Västerås and finished in 2023.

== X32 ==
X32 is a variant of the X31 multiple unit which was ordered in the 2002 by Skånetrafiken and Blekingetrafiken to be used on an electrified Bleking Kustbana when completed, in the meantime it was loaned to SJ and put in to service on the Coast-to-Coast Line between Göteborg and Karlskrona/Kalmar.

The trains had a more comfortable interior then the X31 due to it traveling longer distances. It also had three toilets instead of two on the X31. When the service ended in 2007 the trains were rebuilt to X31 standard as a result of Danish requirements, and the only evidence of their existence is the three toilets and them still bearing the name X32.

== Gallery ==
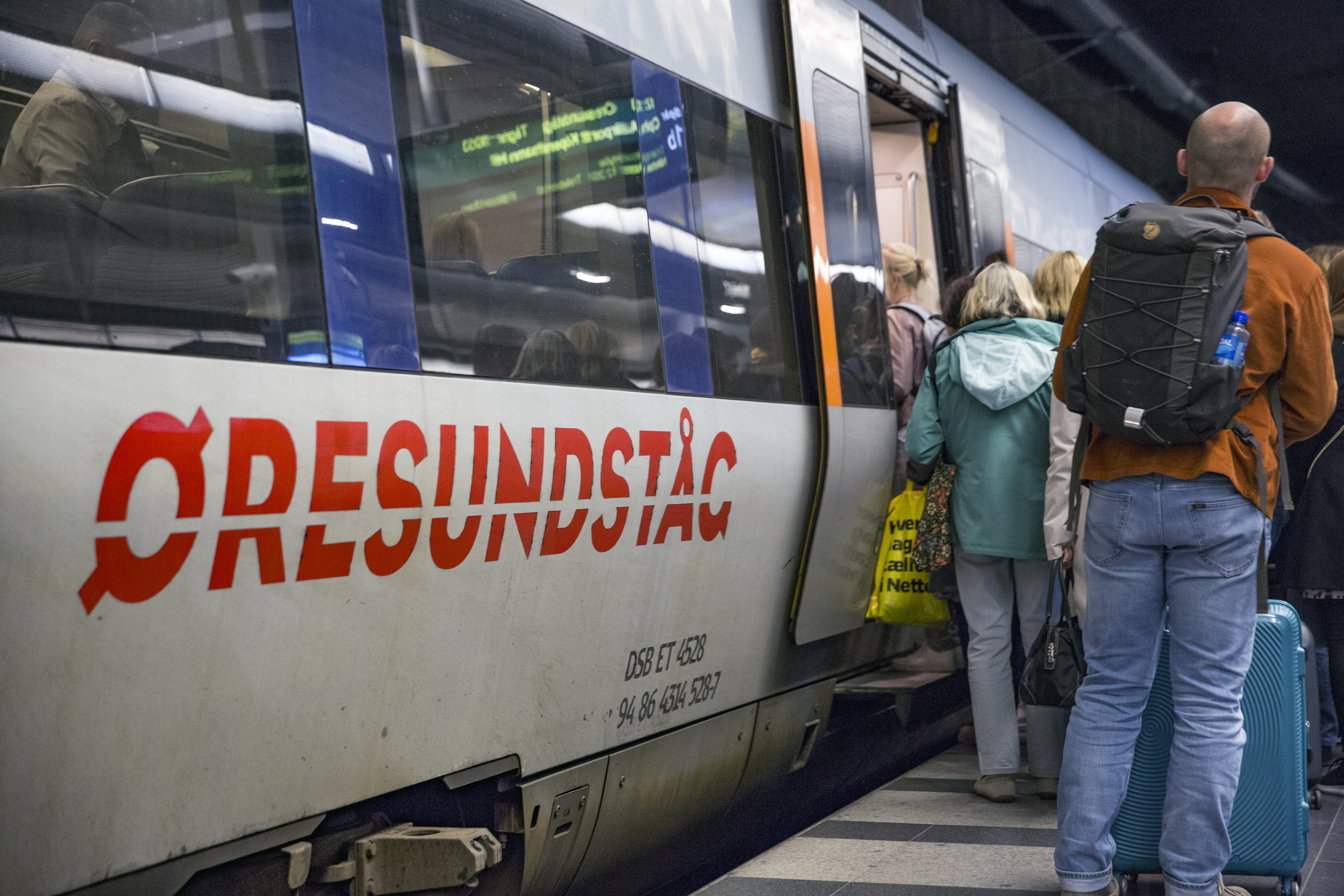
Malmö Central Station

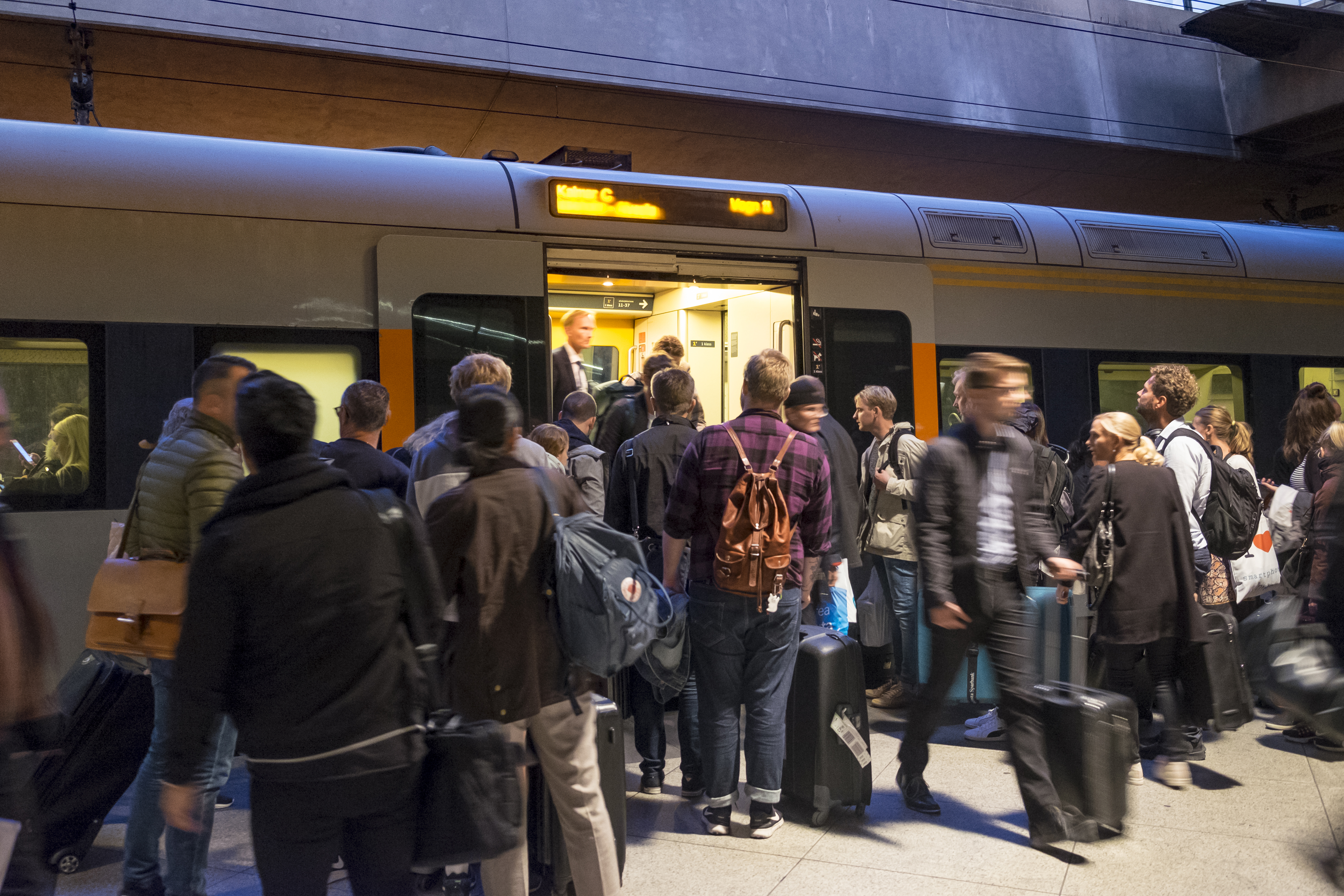
Copenhagen Airport

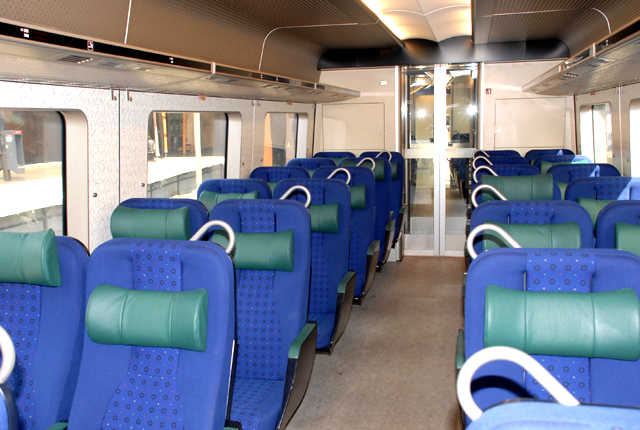
Old interior

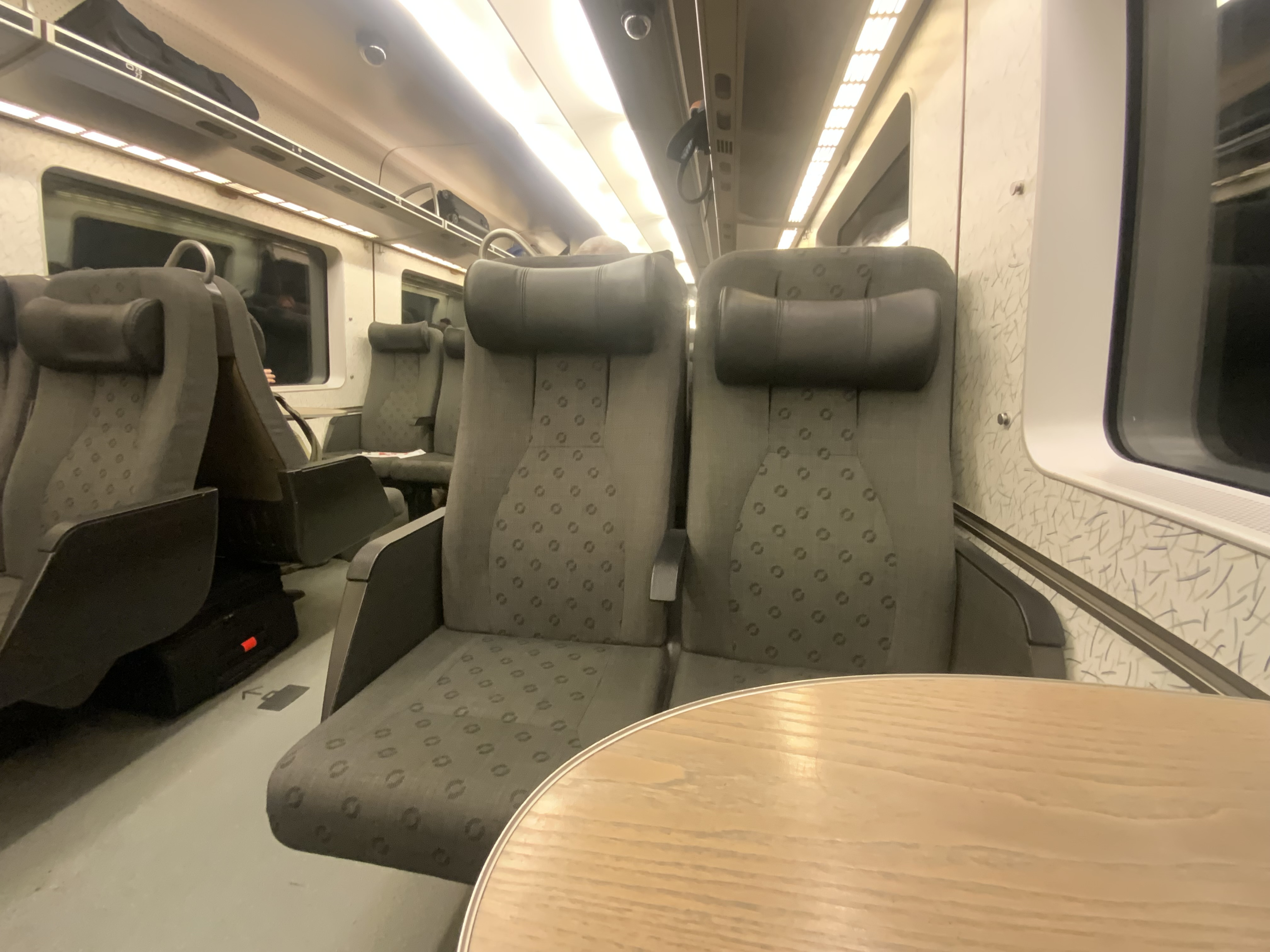
New interior

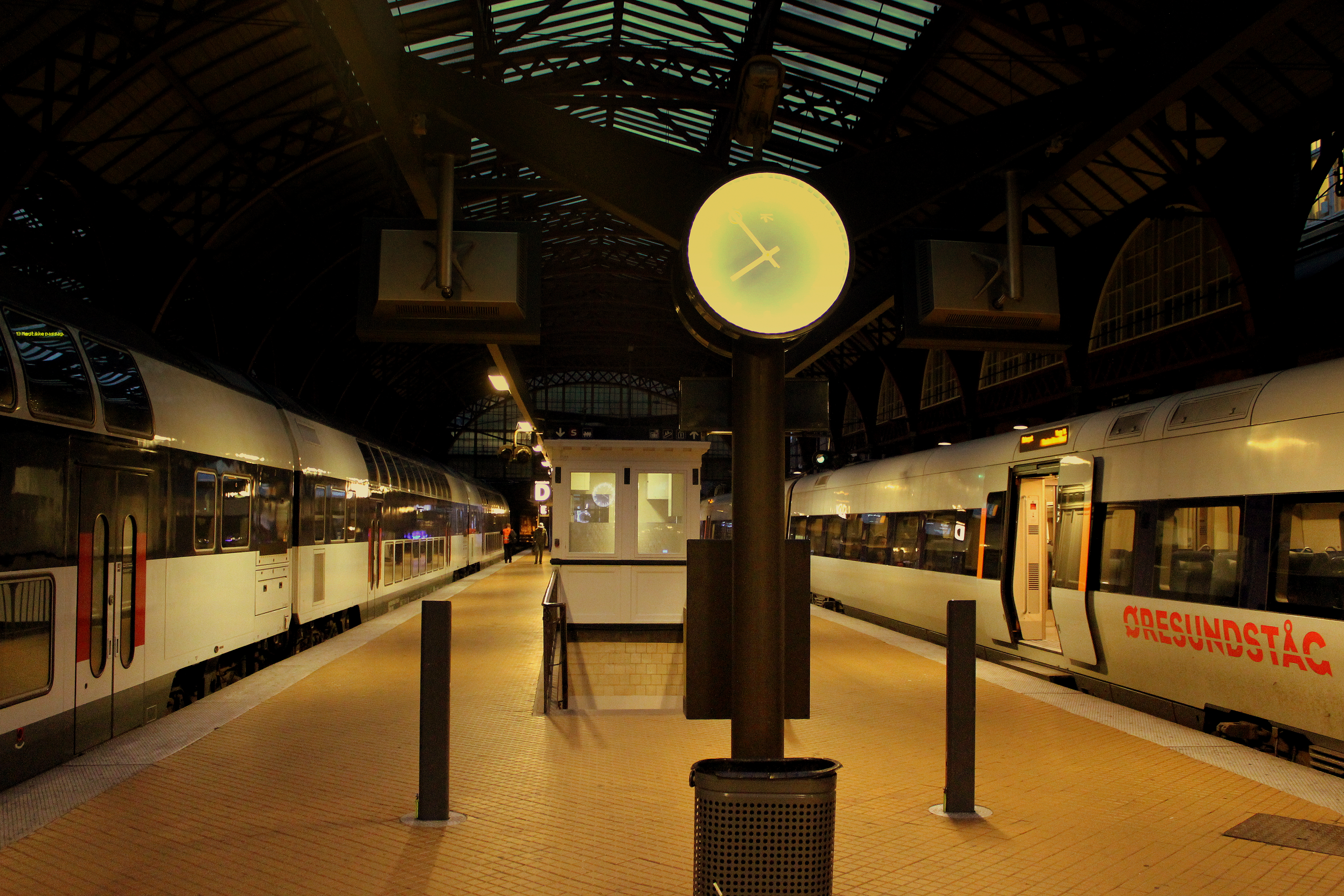
Copenhagen Central Station

== See also ==
- Bornholm Tunnel
- Europabanan
- HH Tunnel
- Øresund Bridge
- Øresund Line
- Rail transport in Europe
