= Continental Line =

Railway line in Sweden

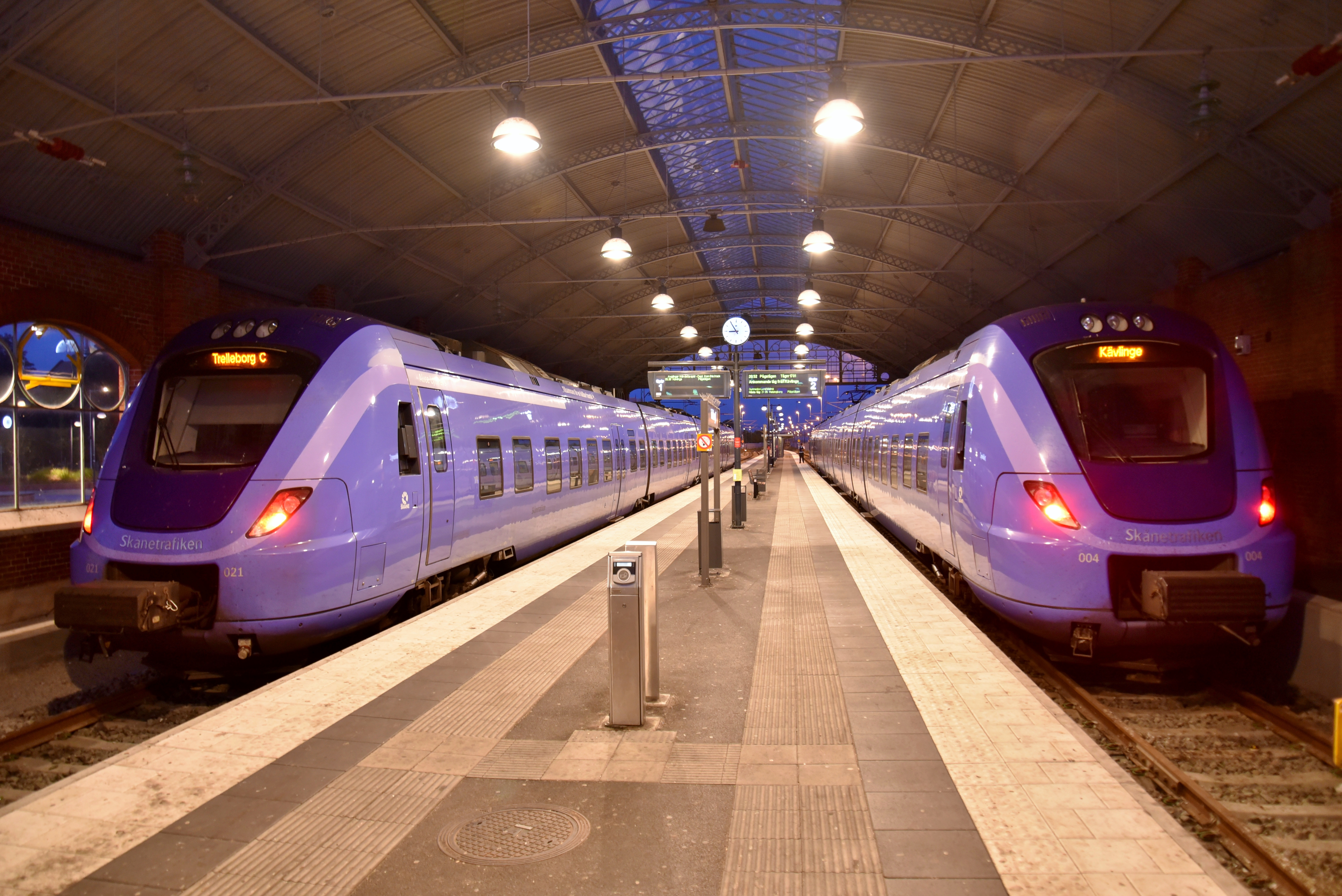
- Two Pågatågen X61 at Trelleborg C the southern terminus of the line.

Overview
- Owner: Trafikverket
- Termini: Malmö C; Trelleborg C

Service
- Type: Electrified Railway
- System: Swedish railways
- Operator(s): Green Cargo; DB Cargo; SJ; Skånetrafiken

History
- Opened: 1898 as Malmö-Kontinentens Järnväg

Technical
- Line length: 32 kilometres (20 mi)
- Track length: 39 kilometres (24 mi)
- Number of tracks: Double or Single
- Character: Freight and passenger
- Track gauge: 1,435 mm (4 ft 8 1/2 in)
- Electrification: 15 kV 16.7 Hz AC

The Continental Line (Swedish: Kontinentalbanan) is a 32-kilometre (20 mi) long railway between Malmö and Trelleborg in Sweden. At Trelleborg the railway formerly ran down to a railway ferry quay and station called Trelleborg F, allowing rail cars to be ferried to Rostock and Sassnitz in Germany. This service was suspended in 2021 and today the tracks are used as storage for Pågatåg train sets. The ferry service to Sassnitz was utilised by Swedish train operator Snälltåget who ran direct sleeper train services between Malmö and Berlin under the name Berlin Night Express. After the suspension of the ferry service trains now travels through Denmark to reach Berlin.

A part of the railway is also part of the line between Malmö and Copenhagen via the Oresund Bridge. Passenger services between Malmö and Trelleborg returned in December 2015 after a 40-year hiatus with new intermediate stops at Västra Ingelstad and Östra Grevie. As of 2018 commuter services run on the Continental line between Malmö C, Östervärn, Rosengård, Persborg, and the City tunnel forming a loop marketed as Malmöpendeln.

== History ==
The line opened in 1898 as Malmö-Kontinentens Järnväg, as part of the planned regular steamboat services between Trelleborg and Sassnitz. The line replaced the Malmö–Trelleborgs Järnväg as it was seen as "not prestigious enough" due to its low speed of only 25 km/h. The new line was capable of 90 km/h. It had nine stations when it opened including: Malmö C, Östervärn, Fosieby, Lockarp, Arrie, Månstorp, Slågarp, Skytts Vemmerlöv, Trelleborg C.

Beginning in 1909 the trains ran on to ferries where as passengers previously had to change themself. With S/S Drottning Victoria, S/S Deutschland and S/S Preussen providing the service. The same year the line was nationalized as it was seen to be of national interest, and SJ took over services. Services from Oslo and Stockholm used the line to reach the continent and anew terminus called Trelleborg F opened in 1925. 1933 saw the line become electrified and in 1953 after the closure of Malmö V trains on the Ystadbanan used the line to reach Malmö. The line was rebuilt with a new approach to Trelleborg in 1970 and at the same time Trelleborg C was closed leaving Trelleborg F as the only remaining station in Trelleborg with it being the terminus for all services until 1973 when the majority of services were removed. A few services run by a single unit continued until 1977 when all stopping passenger services ended.

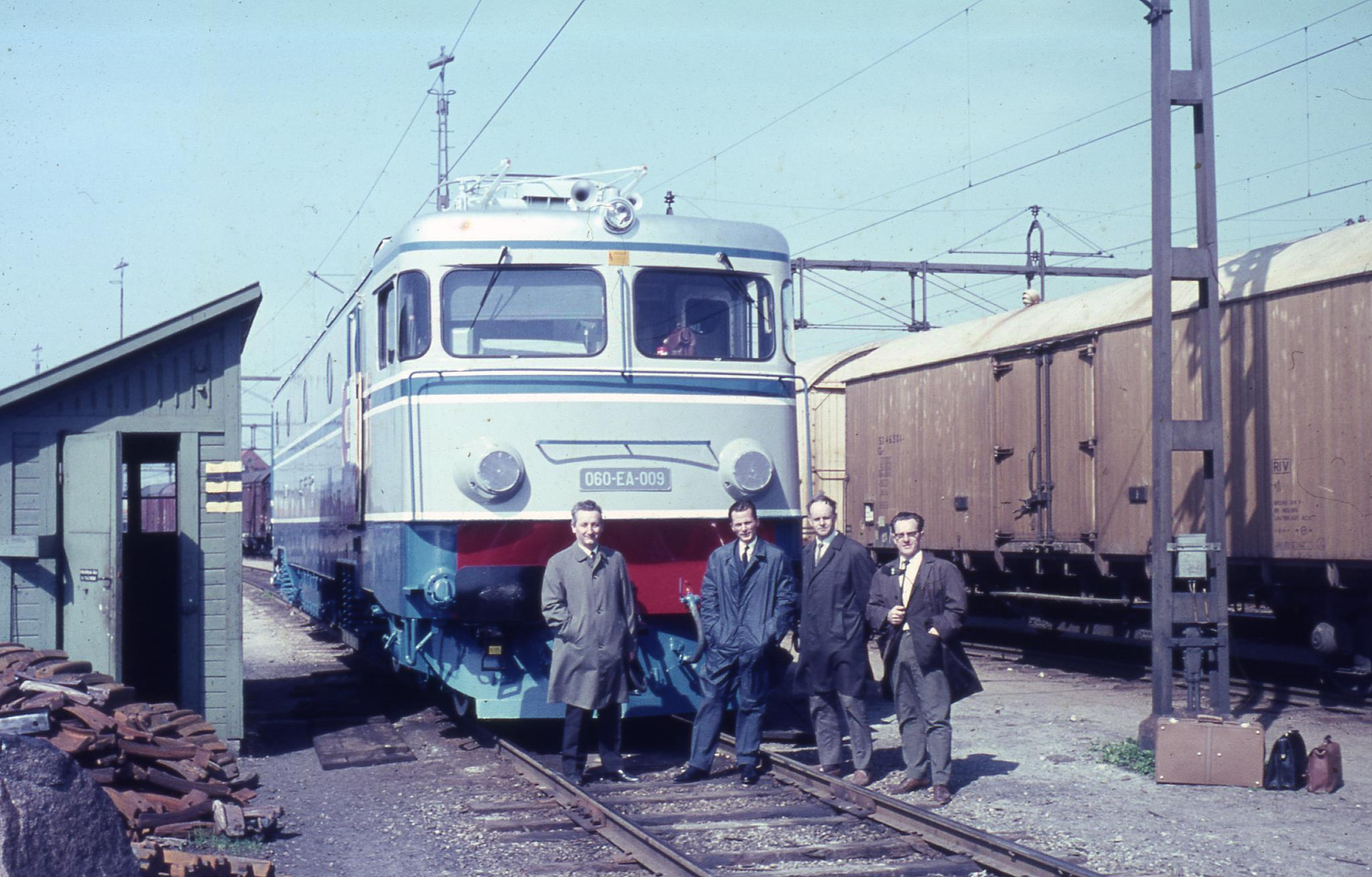
A CFR locomotive at Trelleborg F awaiting a ferry.

Most of the international trains on the railway were foreign, and service from Malmö to the continent including Moscow (operated by the Russian Railways), Hamburg (operated by Deutsche Bundesbahn) and Prague (operated by ČSD). From 1968 to 1971 Deutsche Reichsbahn ran prestigious Berlinaren services between Berlin and Malmö utilising the ferry link. The early 1990s saw an increase in international trafic with four daily trains Sassnitz-Express Malmö - Sassnitz, Berlinaren Malmö - Berlin, Csardas Malmö - Budapest and day train running Malmö - Berlin. but with only the Sassnitz-Express renamed Berlin Night Express surviving to the end of the decade. DB pulled out of the service in 2000 with private German operator GVG taking over, and in 2011 SJ pulled out of the service before Veolia / Snälltåget took it up again in 2012 together with GVG. It used the line until the suspension of train ferry services.

The line was upgraded with new stations at Östra Grevie and Västra Ingelstad and Trelleborg C was refurbished including its train shed and December 2015 services resumed. In 2018 commuter services started to run on the Continental line between Malmö C, Östervärn, Rosengård, Persborg, and the City tunnel forming a loop marketed as Malmöpendeln.

== Services ==
As of December 2025 all passenger services are currently operated by Skånetrafiken. Cargo services are operated by several companies including Green Cargo. Line 9 on the Pågatågen network uses the line on its journey between Trelleborg and Malmö before continuing on to Lund. During rush hour all trains continue on to Höör while some trains terminate at Kristanstad station instead, line 11 is the line marketed as Malmöpendeln and calls at Östervärn, Rosengård and Persborg on the Continental line.
