= Bornholm Tunnel =

Proposed railway tunnel

Coordinates: 55.3°N 14.4°E

The Bornholm Tunnel (Danish: Bornholmtunnelen, Swedish: Bornholmstunneln) is a hypothetical railway tunnel proposed to connect the Danish island of Bornholm with Scania in Sweden. The concept has been promoted by local interest groups to provide a fixed link for direct rail and motorail services to Copenhagen, however it remains a notional proposal with no official political or financial backing from either the Danish or Swedish governments.

The tunnel would be 40 kilometers (25 mi) long and provide a one-hour transit time for cars, including loading and unloading, and a two-hour service by rail to Copenhagen via the Ystad Line and the Øresund Line. The latter could be further reduced with construction of high-speed rail in southern Scania.

== Present traffic ==
Today the island is served by ferries operated by Bornholmslinjen from Rønne, the main town on the island, to Ystad in Sweden, Køge in Denmark and Sassnitz in Germany. Travel time from Ystad to Rønne is two and a half hours with conventional ferries and one hour twenty minutes with fast ferries, with three to eight daily sailings combined. From Rønne to Køge takes five and a half hours and has a single daily sailing, while from Rønne to Sassnitz is seasonal and offered three to ten times per week and takes three and a half hours.

Train connections between Copenhagen Central Station to Ystad Station are available using local train services with a transfer in Malmö. DSB sells tickets to this connection. Between 2000 and 2017 direct train services branded as Intercity Bornholm were available between Copenhagen and Ystad. Danish Air Transport operates flights from Bornholm Airport to Copenhagen Airport.

== Cost ==
Costs for running the ferry service are DKK 400 million per year, of which DKK 150 million are subsidies. Advocates of the tunnel state that if the same user payment and subsidies was used to finance the tunnel, with a running time of 30 years, it would allow investments for DKK 10 billion. Estimates for the cost of the tunnel vary from DKK 5 to 50 billion.

== Politics ==
The Danish organization Foreningen Bornholmtunnel and the Swedish organization Föreningen Stöd Bornholmstunneln collaborate to raise awareness about the importance of a tunnel between Bornholm and Scania. The Bornholm province decided in April 2013 not to pay for a detailed investigation

The project is absent from the Danish Infrastructure Plan 2035 and the Swedish National Plan for Transport Infrastructure 2026–2037. Both nations have prioritised the completion of the Fehmarn Belt Fixed Link and the maintenance of existing cross-border rail links over new Baltic crossings.

Official support for infrastructure on Bornholm has been redirected towards the Bornholm Energy Island project. In January 2026, Denmark and Germany finalised an agreement for a 3 GW offshore wind hub on the island, supported by a €645 million EU grant. This project is viewed by the Danish Parliament as the primary driver for the region's economy, leaving the transport tunnel proposal without a high-level political sponsor.
