= Charlottenlund Castle =

Castle in Scania, Sweden

- Charlottenlunds slott
- Ystad Municipality
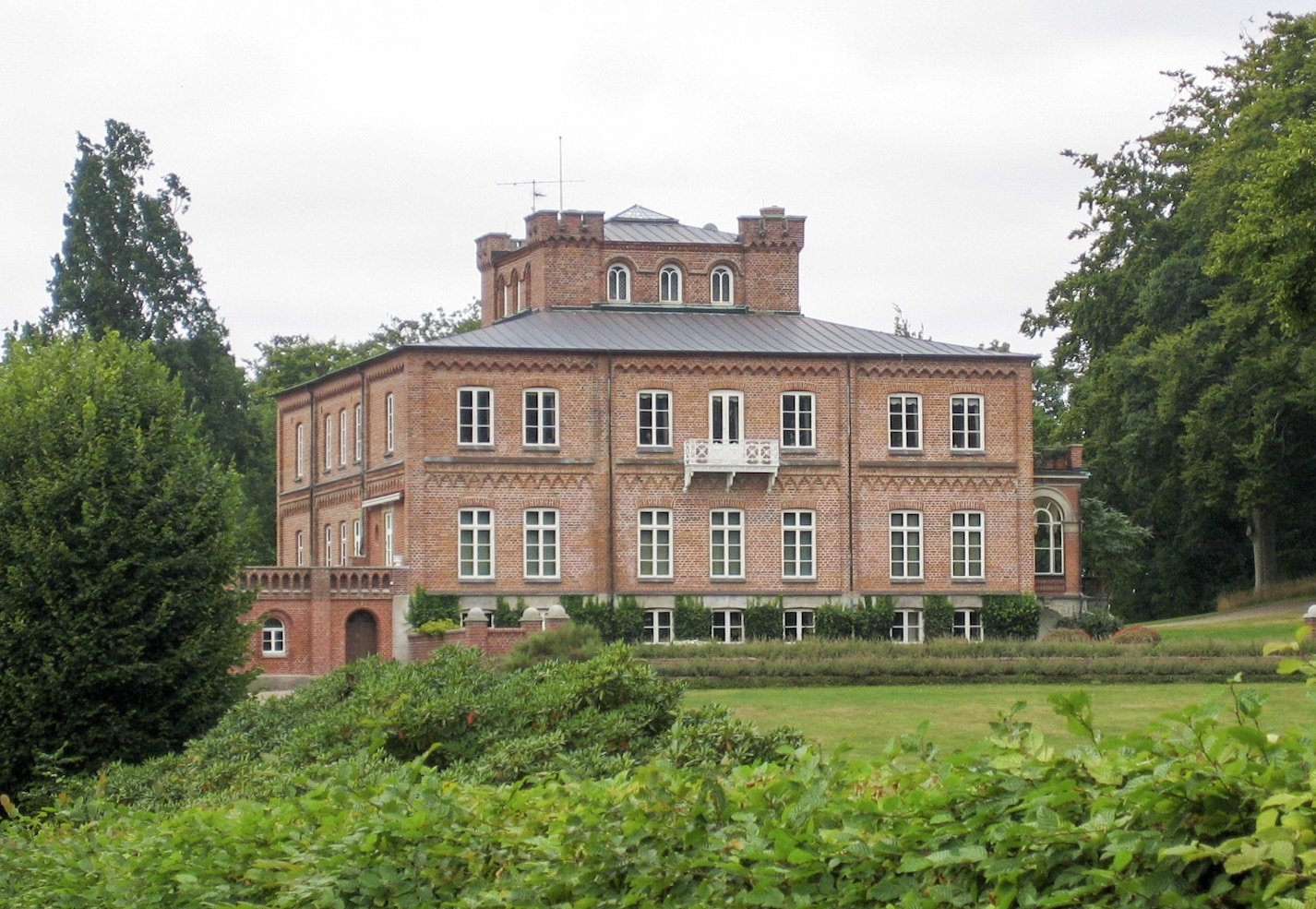
- Charlottenlund Castle

Site information
- Type: Castle
- Open to the public: No

Location
- Scania, Sweden
- Location within Skåne
- Coordinates: 55.430797°N 13.690977°E

Site history
- Built: 1849-50

Charlottenlund Castle (Swedish: Charlottenlunds slott) is a castle in Ystad Municipality, Scania, in southern Sweden.

Charlottenlund is located five miles west of Ystad. The castle was built in 1849 in Gothic Revival style, with an open courtyard with a gallery.

From the beginning, Charlottenlund belonged to Marsvinsholm estate and was then called Snårestad's manor. The farm was subdivided in 1841 and bought in 1848 by Count Arvid Posse. It was he who had the current main building erected. In 1902, the estate was bought and restored by the Danish-born industrialist Jacob Lachmann and his wife Clara Lachmann. It is still owned by his descendants.

== See also ==
- List of castles in Sweden
