= Axel Fredrik Bjurström =

Swedish newspaper publisher

Axel Fredrik Bjurström (born 6 January 1846 in Malmö, died 21 January 1890 in Ystad) was a Swedish newspaper publisher and businessman. He is most famous for founding the paper Ystads Allehanda in 1873.
