= Österlen Line =

Railway line in Sweden

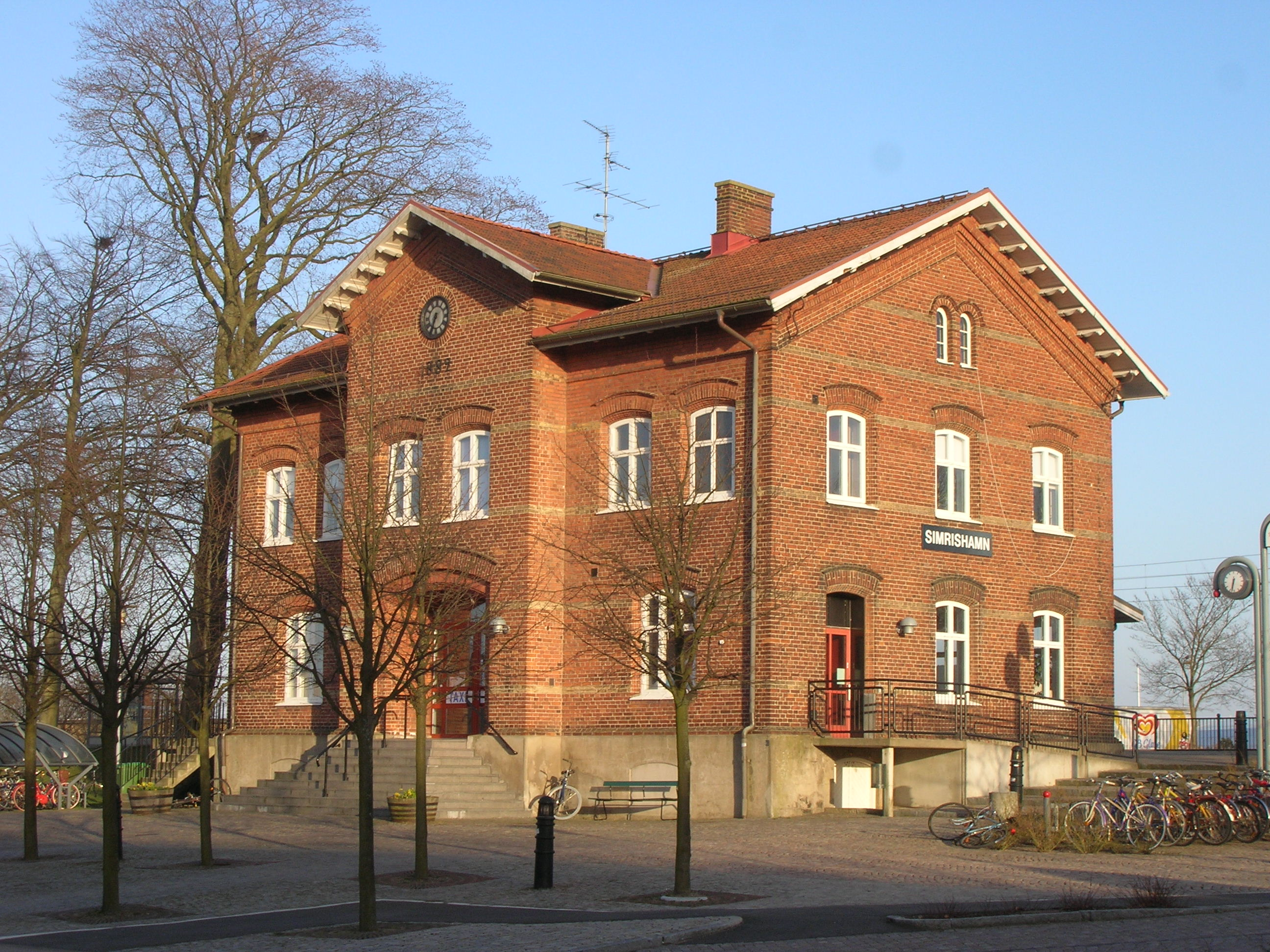
- Simrishamn Station

Overview
- Owner: Trafikverket
- Locale: Skåne County, Sweden
- Termini: Ystad Station; Simrishamn Station
- Stations: 7

Service
- Type: Electrified railway
- System: Swedish Railway Network
- Operator(s): Skånetrafiken

History
- Opened: 1866, 1882

Technical
- Line length: 46 km (28.58 mi)
- Number of tracks: Single
- Character: Passenger
- Track gauge: 1,435 mm (4 ft 8 1/2 in) standard gauge
- Electrification: 15 kV 16.7 Hz AC

The Österlen Line (Swedish: Österlenbanan) is a 46-kilometer (29 mi) long railway line between Ystad and Simrishamn in Skåne County, Sweden. The line is the remains of two former lines, the Malmö–Simrishamn Line and the Ystad–Eslövs Järnväg. The Österlen Line runs from Ystad Station, where it is a continuation of the Ystad Line. The line is single track and electrified. It is served by the Skåne Commuter Rail.

== History ==
The Österlen Line is an amalgamation of two lines: the Malmö–Simrishamn Line and the Ystad–Eslövs Järnväg. The latter was opened in 1866 and was at the time the only railway connection to Ystad. The line had fourteen stops which of three still are in use. Ystad, Köpingebro and Tomelilla. From 1882 the railway was joined by Cimbrishamn-Tomelilla Jernväg at Tomelilla. IN 1896 the CTJ was merged with Malmö-Tomelilla Järnväg to form Malmö–Simrishamns Järnvägar. Trains from Malmö to Simrishamn were marketed as the Bornholmsexpressen, as they corresponded with the ferry to the Danish island of Bornholm. The railways were nationalized in the early 1940s, and from the 1950 Y6 diesel railcars were introduced under the name Bornholmspilen. The 1960s were a hard time for the railways and the line suffered from cuts and in 1970 the passenger service on the Malmö - Tomelilla part was terminated, with services from Malmö to Simrishamn all going via Ystad and coming up on the Ystad - Tomelilla line before continuing on the former CTJ line. In 1984 the Ystad–Eslövs Järnväg line was demolished with the exception of the Ystad - Tomelilla portion. Passenger services had ended three years earlier in 1981 on the line. when the Ystad - Simrishamn line was under threat of being closed down Länstrafiken Kristianstad stepped in and launched the SiTY train using Y1 to operate it. The service was renamed Österlenaren in the late 1990s. The termination of SJs cargo service to Köpingebro in 1991 led to the founding of Österlentåg AB which took over cargo services. The company filed for bankruptcy in 1994. Eventually Sydtåg started freight traffic, but it also had to fold.

In 1996 the Ystad Line was electrified, allowing the Österlen Line to also be electrified. In 1997, Malmöhus County and Kristianstad County were merged to create Skåne County, resulting in the Skåne Commuter Rail being extended from Ystad to Simrishamn. Electrification started in 2001, resulting in the line being closed several summers. At the same time, the line received several upgrades. The electric traction was taken into use on 20 September 2003. In 2006 the Sugar refinery in Köpingebro closed it was the last remaining cargo customer on the line and as a result Green Cargo ended operations on the line, no cargo has been transported on the line since then. In 2022 a new passing loop was built in Gärsnäs.

As of 2025 skånetrafiken pågatåg services are the only operator on the line. Line six operates once every hour and in rush hour every thirty minutes. Trains continue on the Ystad line to Malmö and on further to Lund. The rest of line six operates half hour trafic with every second service terminating at Ystad.

== Service and stations ==
The Österlen line has seven stations as of 2025 with no more stations planned to be built. All trains are run by Skånetrafiken. There are passing loops in Köpingebro though only one platform so it is not possible to pass passenger trains there. Without one train skipping the station. There is another passing loop in the terminus station Tomelilla this is where trains usually pass. lastly a new passing loop was built in Gärsnäs to allow for 2 trains per hour between Ystad and Simrishamn during rush hour.
