= Carolineskolen =

Only Jewish school in Denmark

Coordinates: 55.7222°N 12.5577°E

Carolineskolen is a Jewish private school in Copenhagen, Denmark. Today, the school is the only Jewish school in Denmark.

== History ==
In 1805, Mosaisk Drengeskole ("Jewish Boys' School") was established in Copenhagen, and in 1810 a corresponding school for girls was established. The girls' school obtained permission from king Frederick VI of Denmark to name the school after his daughter Princess Caroline, hence Carolineskolen. Only after World War II were the two schools merged to one, taking the name of the girls' school as its continuing common name. It is one of the oldest still-existing Jewish schools in the world.

== Current building ==
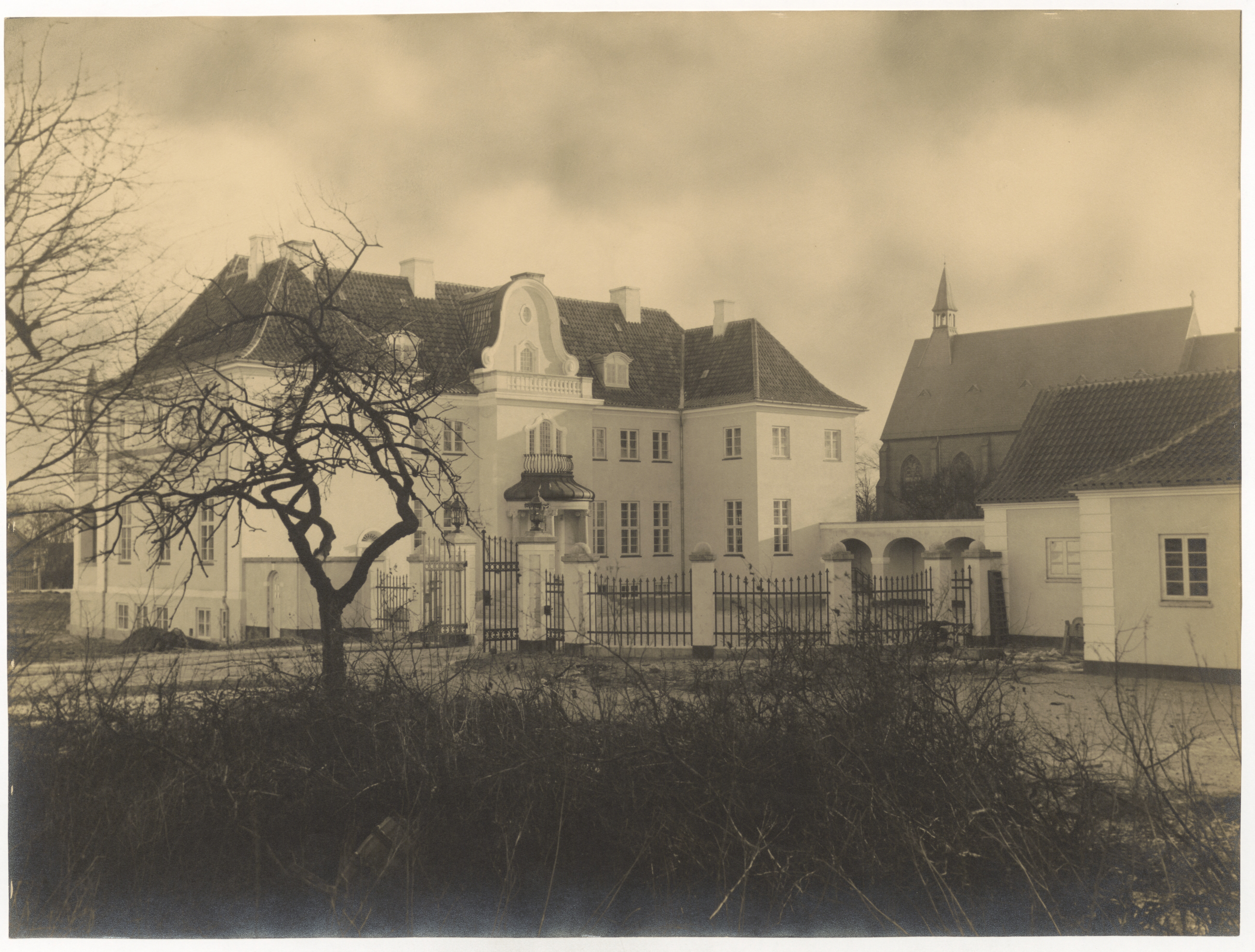
Aage Heuman's house.

The oldest part of the present building complex on Strandvejen is the former private home of businessman Aage Heyman. Heymann was the son of Tuborg-founder Philip Heyman. His houses was constructed in 1907 to designs by Carl Brummer. The house was later owned by bank manager Otto Eingberg. It was later used as a homeopatic hospital. In 1954, it was acquired by Foreningen til Provinsbørns Ferieophold i København and used as a summer camp for children from the procinces. In 1969, it was acquired by Copenhagen Municipality and converted into a teacher training college. In 2016, Københavns Pædagogseminarium relocated to the new Carlsberg Campis. The premises were subsequently taken over by Carolineskolen.

== Teaching ==
Pupils are taught Hebrew as an addition to the normal school subjects. The religion lessons cover a broad variety of religions, as it is normal in Denmark, but the main focus is Judaism.

== See also ==
- Jews in Denmark
- Clara Lachmann
- Kundby case
