= Greyfriars Abbey, Ystad =

Former Franciscan monastery in Ystad, Sweden

The Abbey in Ystad
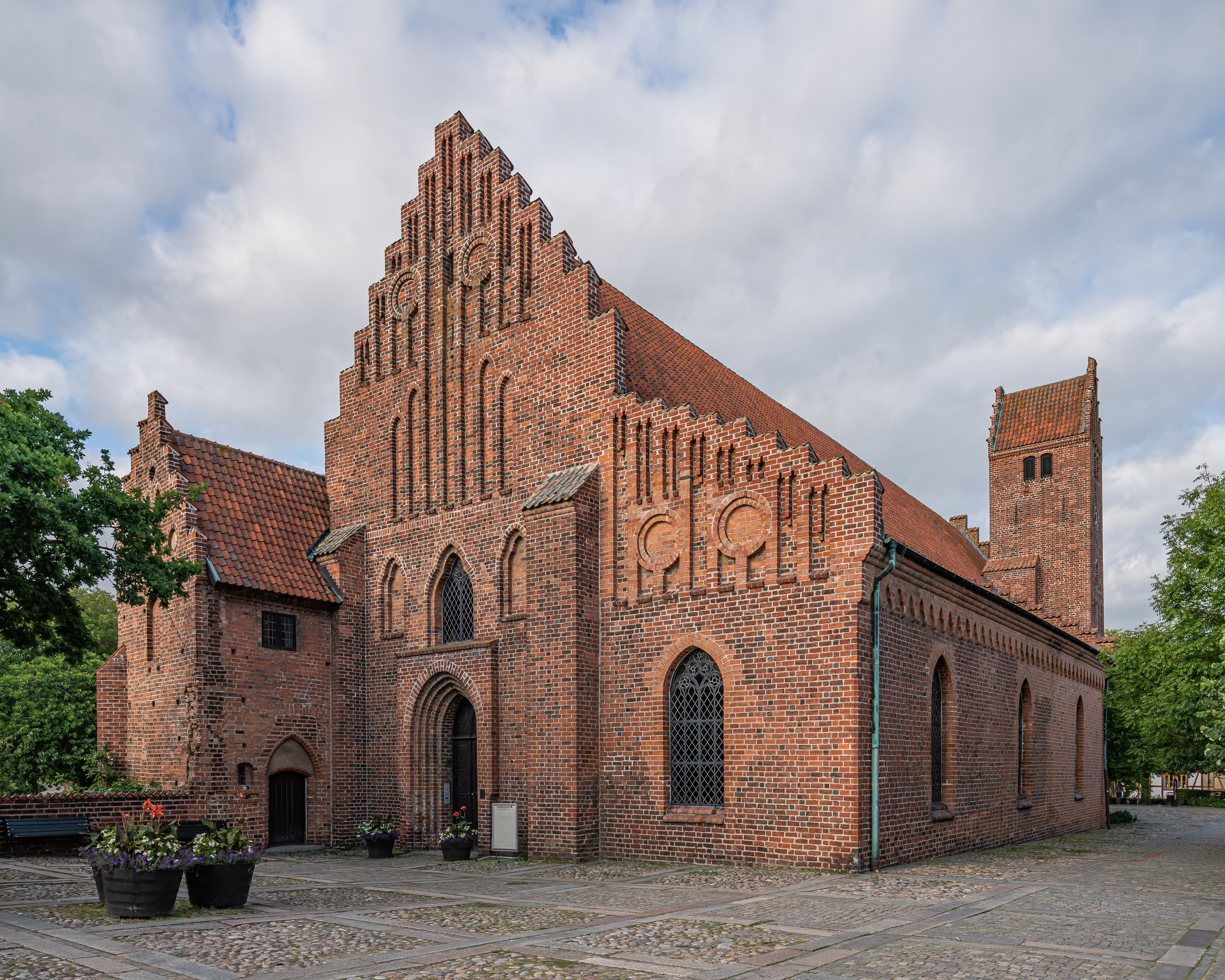

- Location within Skåne
- Interactive map of The Abbey in Ystad

Monastery information
- Other name: Ystad Abbey
- Order: Franciscans
- Established: 1267
- Disestablished: 1532

Site
- Location: Ystad, Skåne County, Sweden
- Coordinates: 55°25′51″N 13°49′10″E

The Greyfriars Abbey (Swedish: Gråbrödraklostret), sometimes also simply Abbey in Ystad (Swedish: Klostret i Ystad), is a medieval former friary in Ystad, Sweden. Together with Vadstena Abbey, it is one of the best-preserved medieval monasteries in Sweden. It houses the Museum of the cultural history of Ystad (Swedish: Klostret i Ystad).

== History ==
According to an inscription from the 14th century, the monastery was founded by a donation by a knight called Holmger and his wife Katarina in 1267 and inaugurated by the Bishop of Reval. From the outset, it belonged to the Franciscan order, who were popularly known as grey friars (hence the name of the monastery), and functioned as a friary for friars. Throughout the Middle Ages several documented donations to the monastery took place.

In 1532, amidst the ongoing reformation in Denmark, the Danish king Frederick I ordered the Franciscans to leave the monastery. They were however not allowed to leave in peace as the citizens of Ystad took the matter in their own hands and forcibly evicted the friars on 24 March 1532. Subsequently, the building was transformed into an almshouse. Little is known of the building's fate during this time, but sometime, probably during the early years of the 1600s, the western and northern wings of the building were pulled down, quite possibly due to a lack of funding. The brick was probably sold as building material and used in the building of some nearby manor or castle.

In 1658, Denmark handed over Ystad and the monastery to Swedish authorities following the Treaty of Roskilde. In 1777, the hospital closed and the premises were taken over by the state-owned akvavit distillery, but as the state abolished its alcohol monopoly in 1786 it became used instead as a granary. In the early 19th century the building was left to decay. In 1877, the building was purchased by the city government and plans both to restore and to pull the building down were ventilated. It was only in 1909, however, that restoration works finally began, funded by Clara Lachmann.

== Architecture ==
The monastery complex consists of three connected buildings: the parish church of St. Peter (the former church of the monastery), the former gatehouse and the one preserved wing originally forming one side of a quadrangle. The buildings are almost exclusively erected in red brick, making the edifice one of the most striking examples in Sweden of Brick Gothic. Surrounding the buildings are a rose garden, laid out in 2002, and a herbal garden, laid out in 1998.

=== The church of St. Peter ===
The former church of the monastery is a narrow, rectangular church with whitewashed Gothic groin vaulting and restrained decoration, both on the inside and the exterior. This is typical for Franciscan churches, an outward sign of their pledges of poverty. The nave is flanked by a single aisle to the south. The windows are high and narrow Gothic windows. A bell tower that reaches above the rest of the church is located to the east of the aisle. Externally, the western façade is decorated with blind arches.

=== The gatehouse ===
The two-storey gatehouse dates from sometime between the late 14th century and the middle of the 15th, a period in which the monastery was greatly expanded. It originally connected the church with the western wing, now destroyed, which probably housed guest rooms.

=== The monastery ===
The one surviving wing of the monastery proper is a rectangular building with a cloister facing the former quadrangle. The building has a half-timbered extension protruding to the north-east, and richly decorated crow-stepped gables. The windows are typically pointed undecorated Gothic windows.

== Gallery ==
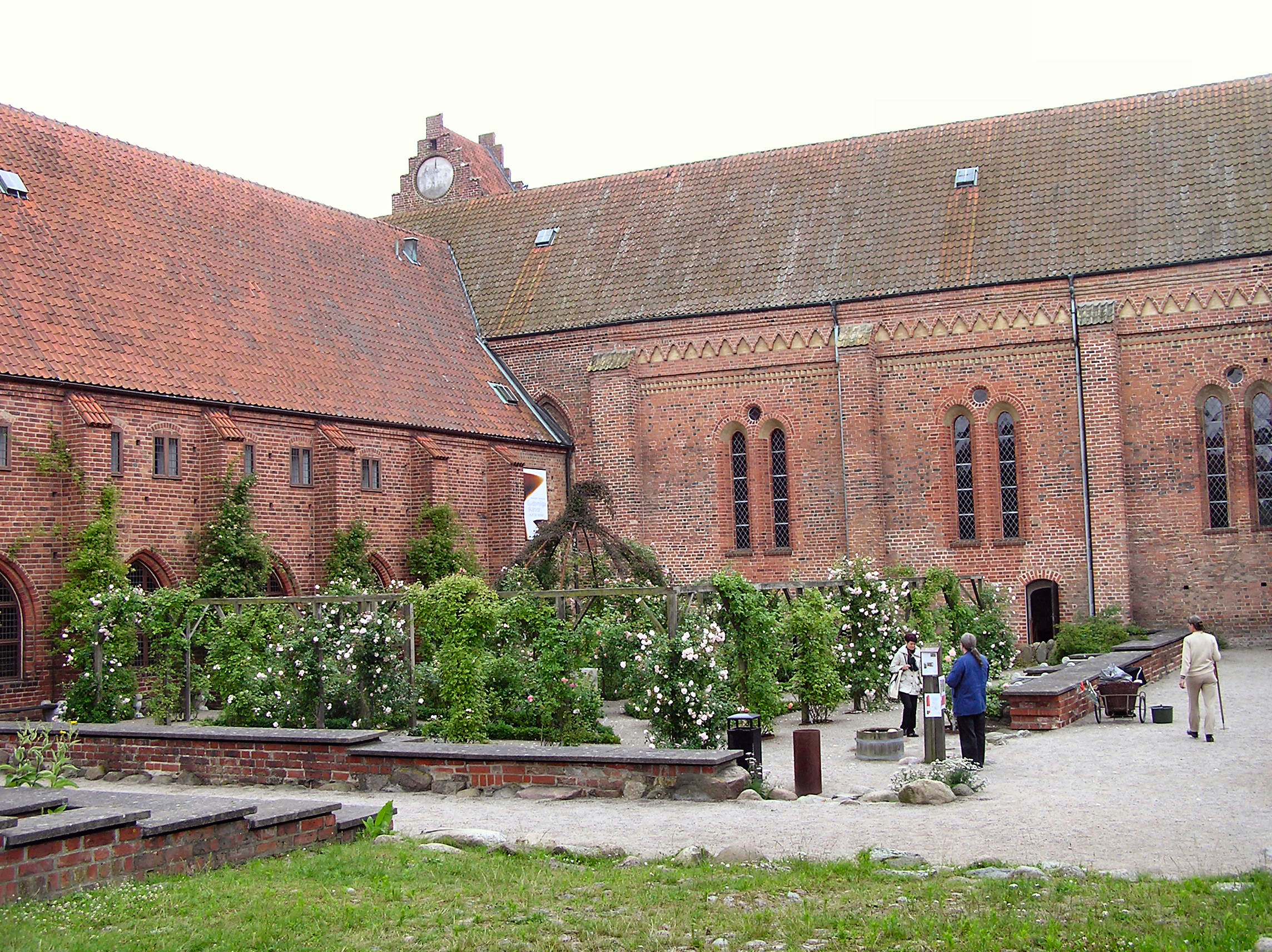
Exterior view from the north-west

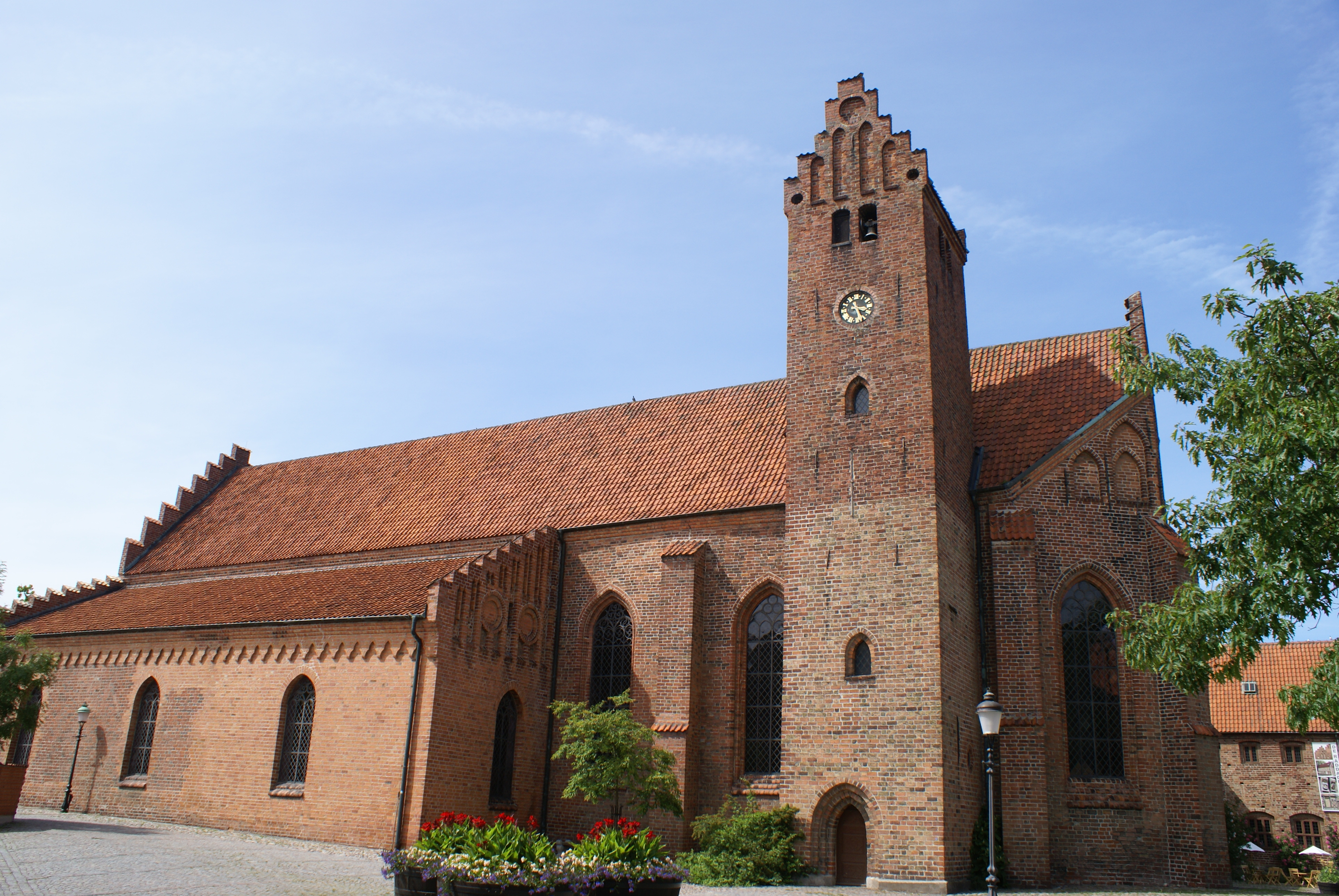
Exterior view from the south-east

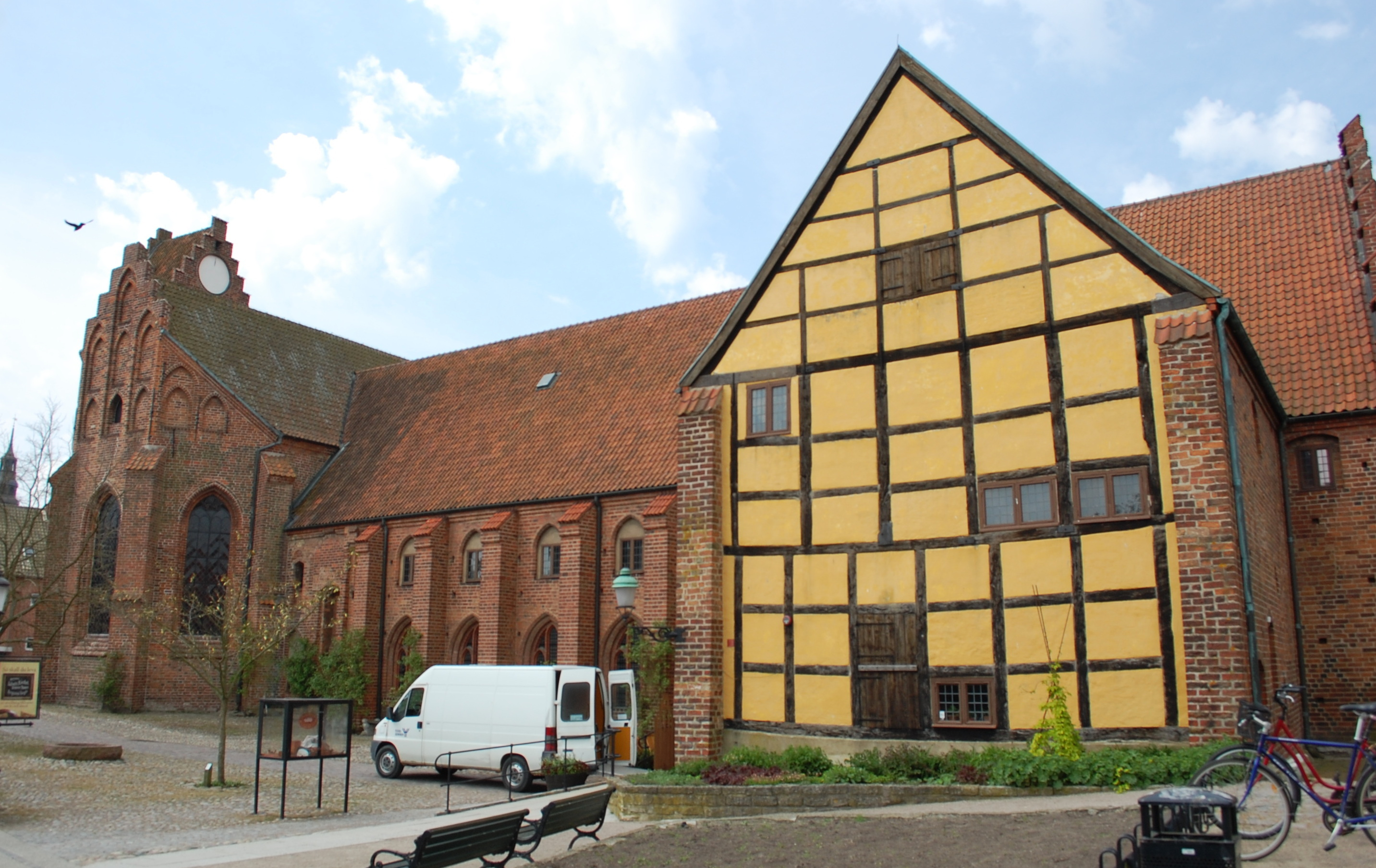
Exterior view from the north-east

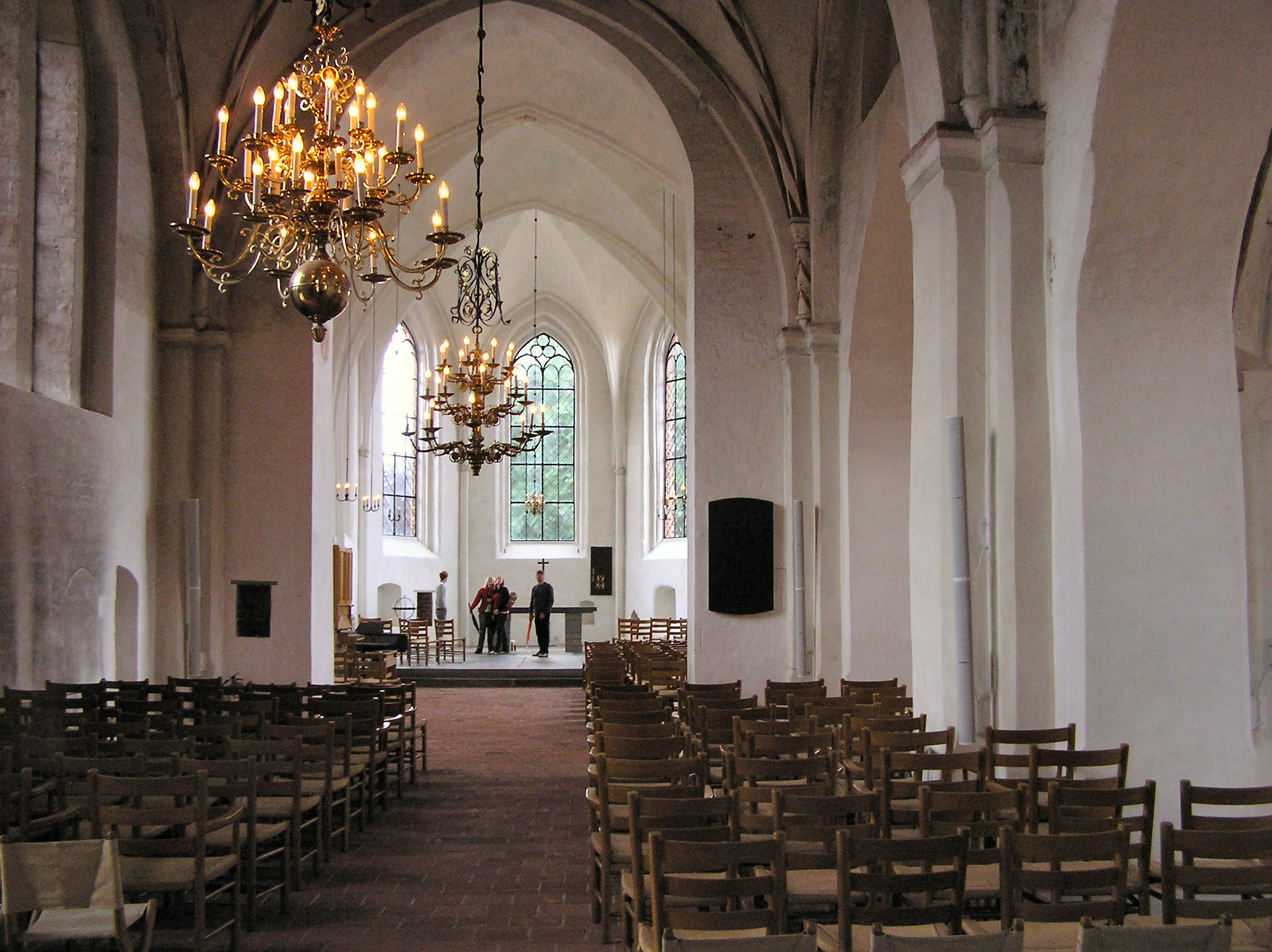
Interior view of the church

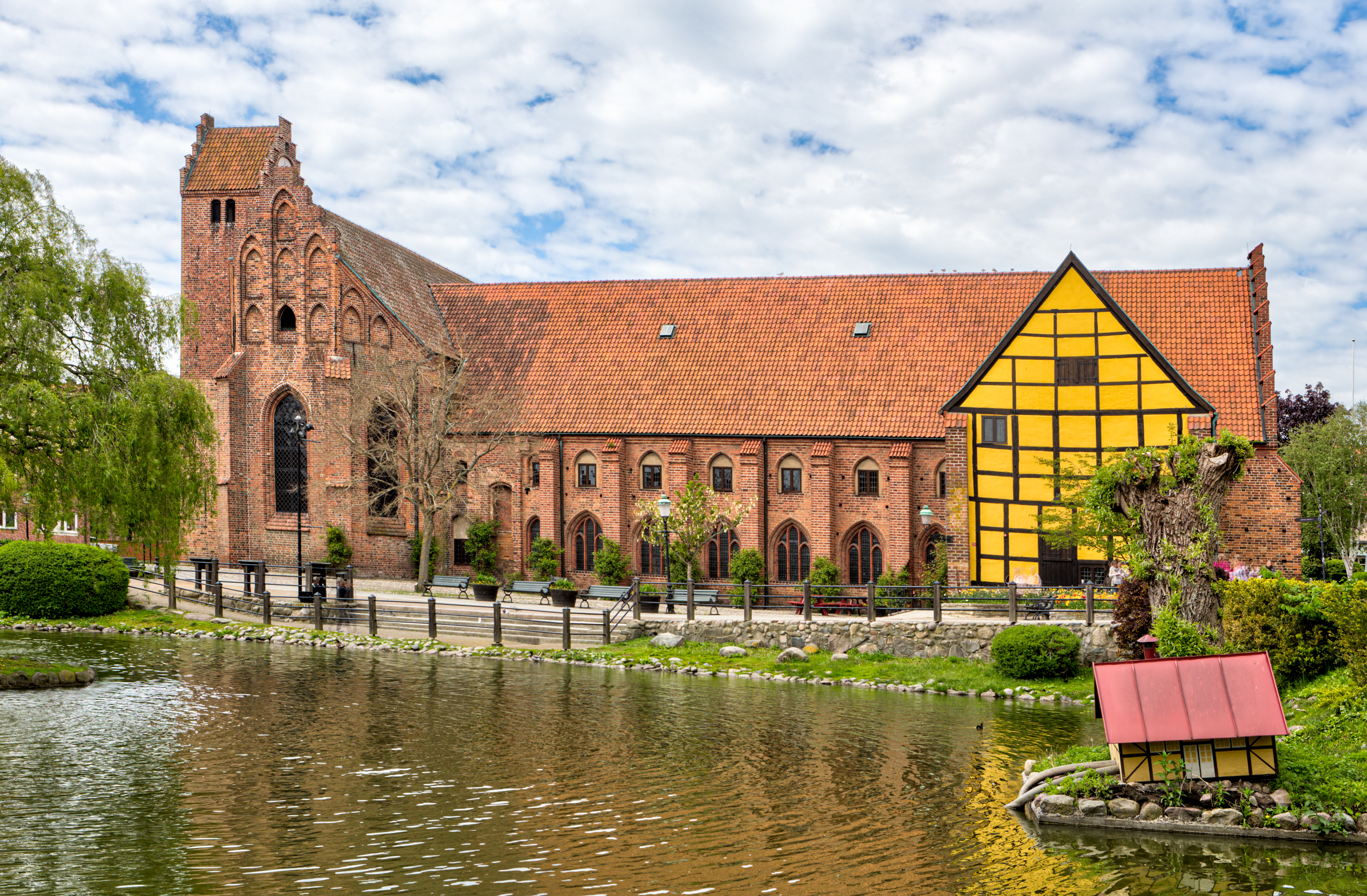
Greyfriars Abbey, Ystad

== See also ==
- List of Brick Gothic buildings
- List of monasteries in Sweden
- St. Mary's Church, Ystad
