= Clara Lachmann =

Danish-Swedish patron of the arts (1864–1920)

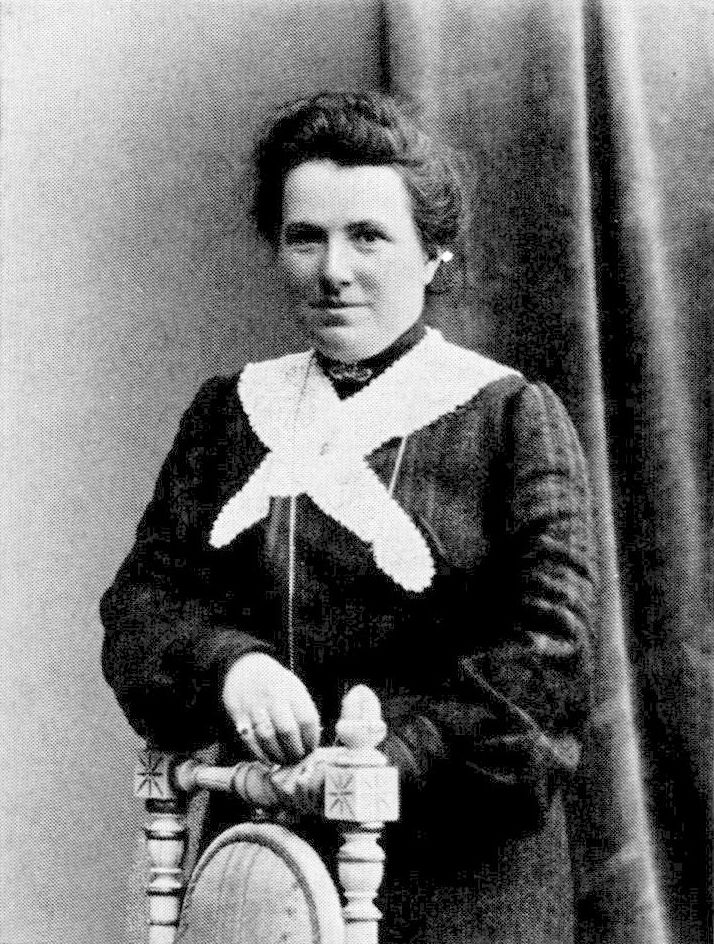
- Lachmann c. 1900
- Born: Clara Meyer; 10 April 1864; Copenhagen, Denmark
- Died: 10 August 1920 (aged 56); Charlottenlund Castle, Ystad, Sweden
- Resting place: Mosaisk Vestre Begravelsesplads
- Education: Carolineskolen; Tegne- og Kunstindustriskolen for Kvinder
- Occupation: Patron of the arts
- Years active: 1891–1920
- Spouse: Jacob Lachmann (m. 1891; died 1909)
- Children: 1

Clara Lachmann (née Meyer; 10 April 1864 – 10 August 1920) was a Danish and Swedish patron of the arts. After coming into immense wealth following her marriage to one of the richest men in Sweden, Lachmann became a prominent sponsor of musical events, building restorations, and new constructions. Additionally, she dedicated a significant portion of money in her will to the establishment of the Clara Lachmann Foundation, which promotes Scandinavism through culture and the arts.

== Biography ==
Clara Meyer was born on 10 April 1864 in Copenhagen, Denmark. Her father was the engraver and bullet manufacturer Michael Meyer, while her mother Fromme Eichel was descended from a prominent Danish Jewish family. Raised in Copenhagen's Jewish bourgeoisie alongside seven brothers, Meyer attended the Carolineskolen, a private Jewish girls' school. At age 19, she began attending the Draftsmanship and Industrial Design School for Women, apprenticing under the painters Oscar Matthiessen and J. F. Willumsen.

On 6 May 1891, Meyer married her cousin Jacob Lachmann, an industrialist twenty years older than her. Jacob had become extremely wealthy through the sugar industry, and was one of the richest men in Sweden at the time. The couple moved across the Øresund to Ystad in southern Sweden, where her husband owned a large sugar refinery. Their daughter Olga was born in 1894. In 1902, the family moved into the Charlottenlund Castle, restoring it with the assistance of Willumsen and accruing a large collection of 19th-century Nordic art. Lachmann and her husband became prominent members of the Jewish community in Malmö.

Lachmann enjoyed artistic endeavors, particularly music. A player of both the piano and violoncello, she performed in public concerts in Ystad and hosted a series of music festivals alongside the singer Salomon Smith. The pair also organized several chamber groups - particularly Smith's Chamber Music Society - and gathered prominent musicians from across Scandinavia, including Wilhelm Stenhammar, Tor Aulin, and Franz Neruda. For this, the Dictionary of Swedish National Biography credits Lachmann and Smith for making Ystad a center of Scanian music.

Jacob Lachmann unexpectedly died of appendicitis in 1909, and his fortune was split between his wife and daughter. Through this newfound personal wealth, Lachmann became a prominent philanthropist and patron of the arts. Among her donations, she sponsored the restoration of Greyfriars Abbey and the construction of the Malmö Synagogue. Her daughter Olga died in 1919 aged 25, leaving Lachmann with her husband's full remaining fortune and no heir. She revised her will the following year, setting aside a significant portion to establish an organization dedicated to promoting Scandinavism through culture and the arts, honoring her dual nationality.

Lachmann died of liver cancer at Charlottenlund Castle on 10 August 1920. She is buried in the Mosaisk Vestre Begravelsesplads in Copenhagen alongside her husband and daughter. In 1923, the fund set aside in her will was used to establish the Clara Lachmann Foundation. Headquartered in Gothenburg and under the oversight of the Västra Götaland County administrative board, the foundation is led by a multinational board of directors consisting of two members from Denmark, two from Sweden, one from Norway, and (since 1990) one from Iceland. Among the organizations financially supported by the foundation are the Nordic Associations.
