= St. Mary's Church, Ystad =

Church in Ystad, Sweden

Coordinates: 55°25′45″N 13°49′07″E

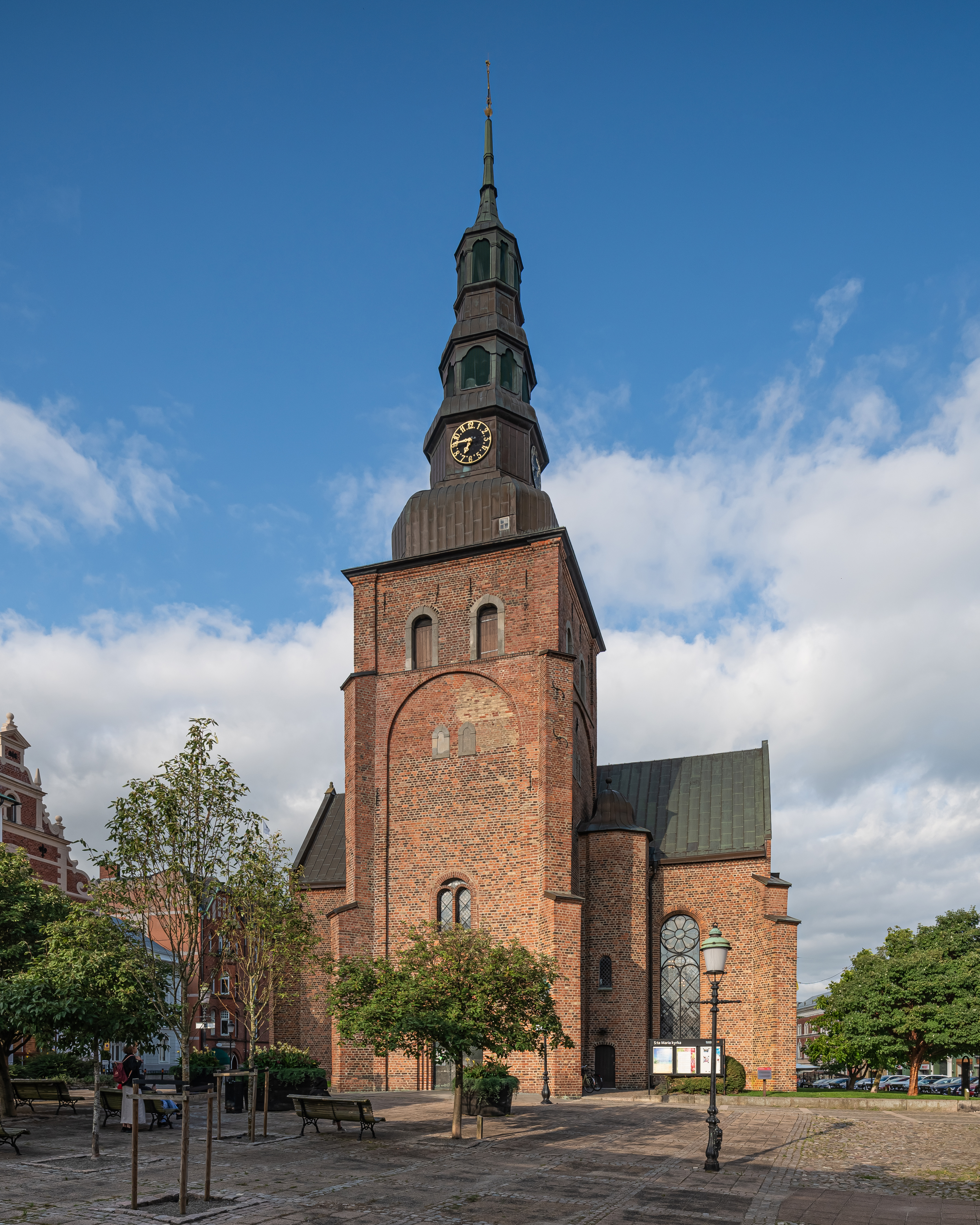
St. Mary's Church, Ystad. External view

St. Mary's Church, Ystad (Swedish: S:ta Maria kyrka) is a medieval Lutheran church in Ystad, Sweden. It is the main church of the city.

== History ==
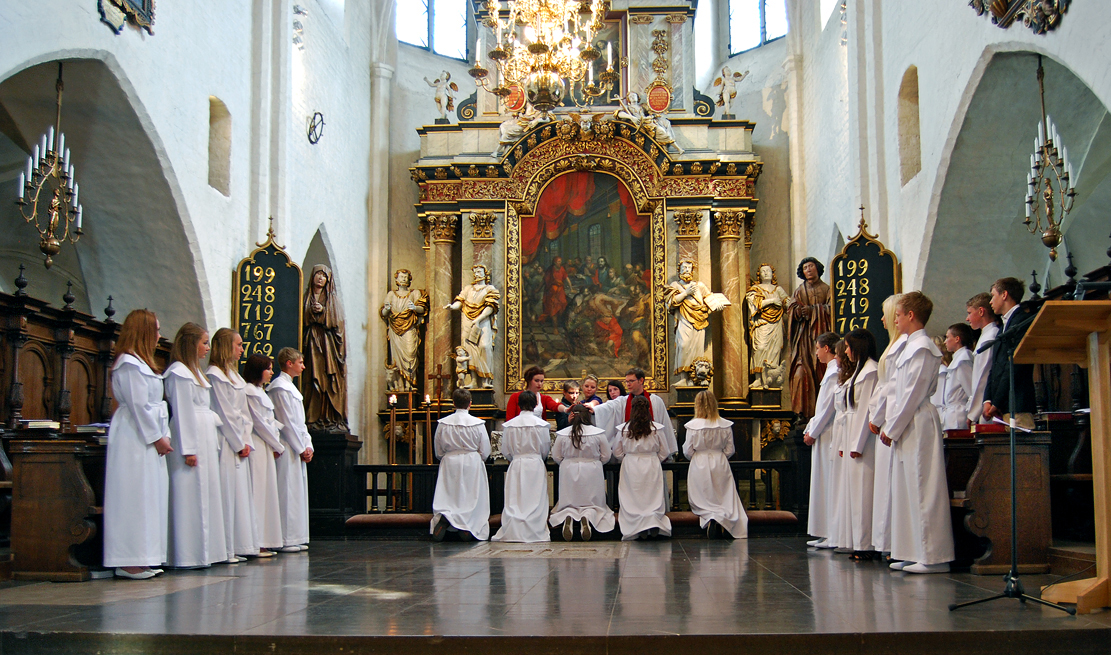
Confirmation being celebrated in the church

The first church on the site was a Romanesque basilica-shaped church building, erected during the 13th century. It was expanded in Gothic style circa 1275, and the remains of this extension are the oldest surviving parts of the church (a single mural-decorated vault).

During the 14th and 15th centuries the church was successively rebuilt, until it acquired the look it more or less still displays today. The church was damaged in a storm in 1648 and received a new transept shortly afterwards. A new Baroque tower was also erected. Minor alterations were carried out in the interior of the church during the 18th century, and in the 1830s the church was partly reconstructed after designs by Carl Georg Brunius (1792-1869). In 1886 another, rather insensitive, renovation scheme was carried out. A historically more accurate renovation was again done in 1923-24.

== Architecture ==
The church is built in an accomplished Brick Gothic style. It contains some fine furnishings including a Baroque high altar, a large side-altar from the 15th century made in northern Germany, two medieval wooden sculptures of Mary and St. John, fragments of murals and an iron chandelier from the 14th century. There are also two large medieval crucifixes on one of which the sculpture of Jesus is adorned with real hair.

== See also ==
- Greyfriars Abbey, Ystad
