= List of Christian monasteries in Sweden =

This is a list of Christian monasteries and religious houses, both extant and dissolved, in Sweden, for both men and women.

== A ==
- Åhus Priory, Åhus: Dominican friars
- Alsike Convent (extant) (founded 1978): Evangelical-Lutheran nuns, Order of the Holy Paraclete (Helgeandssystrarna)
- Alvastra Abbey (1143 - 1544): Cistercian monks
- Ås Abbey, Halland: Cistercian monks
- Askeby Abbey (c. 1100 x 1170 - 1529): Cistercian nuns

== B ==
- Bäckaskog Abbey, Skåne: Premonstratensian canons
- Bosö Abbey, Skåne: Benedictine monks
- Byarum Abbey (c. 1170 - 1230; moved to Sko): Cistercian nuns
- Börringe Priory, Skåne

== D ==
- Dalby Priory, Skåne: Augustinian monks (12th–16th century)
- Djusholm Abbey (extant): Bridgettines
- Dragsmark Abbey (Marieskog), Bohuslän: Premonstratensian canons

== E ==
- Enköping: Franciscan friars

== F ==
- Falun Abbey (extant): Bridgettines
- Fogdö, see Vårfruberga

== G ==
- Greyfriars, Stockholm (1270-1527): Franciscan friars
- Gudhem Abbey (1052/1152 - 1529): nuns of unknown order; later Cistercian nuns
- Gudsberga Abbey (1486–1527): Cistercian monks

== H ==
- Halmstad, Skåne: Franciscan friars
- Herrevad Abbey, Skåne: Cistercian monks

== J ==
- Julita Abbey (aka Säby Abbey) (c. 1160 - 1527): Cistercian monks
- Jönköping Abbey

== K ==
- Kalmar Nunnery (1299-1505), Dominikan nuns, moved to Skänninge Abbey
- Kastelle Abbey, Bohuslän: Augustinian Canons
- Kungahålla, formerly Konghelle, Bohuslän: Franciscan friars
- Krokek (not later than 1440 - not later than 1538): Franciscan friars
- Kronobäck Hospital: hospital from 1292, at Kronobäck; under Knights Hospitallers from 1482 to 1529, when monastic parts demolished, and continued as secular hospital; date of closure nk

== L ==
- Linköping: Franciscan friars
- Lund Abbey, Lund, Skåne: Benedictine monks

== M ==
- Malmö, Skåne: Franciscan friars
- Mariefred Charterhouse or Gripsholm Charterhouse (1493–1526) near Gripsholm Castle; later in the town of Mariefred, named after the monastery: Carthusian monks
- Marstrand Friary, Marstrand, Bohuslän: Franciscan friars

== N ==
- Nydala Abbey (1143 - 1529): Cistercian monks

== O ==
- Örebro Priory: Carmelite friars
- Östanbäck Monastery (extant) (founded 1975) in Sala, Västmanland: Lutheran Benedictine monks (Heliga korsets brödraskap)
- Öved Abbey, Skåne: Premonstratensian canons

== R ==
- Riseberga Abbey (12th century - 1500 x 1546): Cistercian nuns
- Roma Abbey (1164 - not later than 1531): Cistercian monks

== S ==
- Säby, see Julita
- Skänninge Abbey (1272-1544): Dominican nuns
- Sko Abbey (1230 - 1588): Cistercian nuns
- Solberga Abbey (1246 - 1404): Cistercian nuns
- St. Clare's Priory, Stockholm (1289 - Reformation): Poor Clares
- St Dominikus kloster, Rögle, Lund. (extant) (1956 - ): Dominikan sisters

== T ==
- Trelleborg, Skåne: Franciscan friars

== V ==
- Vadstena Abbey (extant) (1384–1595; the mother house of the Bridgettine Order; renewed Bridgettine presence from 1935; first abbess appointed 1991): Bridgettines
- Vårfruberga Abbey, previously known as Fogdö Abbey (12th century - 1527): Benedictine nuns until 1289, thereafter Cistercian nuns
- Varnhem Abbey (c. 1150 - 1527): Cistercian monks
- Vreta Abbey (c. 1099/1105 - 1582): Benedictine nuns until 1162, thereafter Cistercian nuns

== Y ==
- Greyfriars Abbey, Ystad, Skåne: Franciscan friars

== See also ==
- List of Christian monasteries in Denmark
- List of Christian monasteries in Norway
- List of Christian monasteries in Finland

== Sources ==
- Askeby Abbey website: history page (in Swedish)
