= Ystad railway station =

Railway station in Ystad, Sweden

Coordinates: 55.42732°N 13.82422°E

Ystad
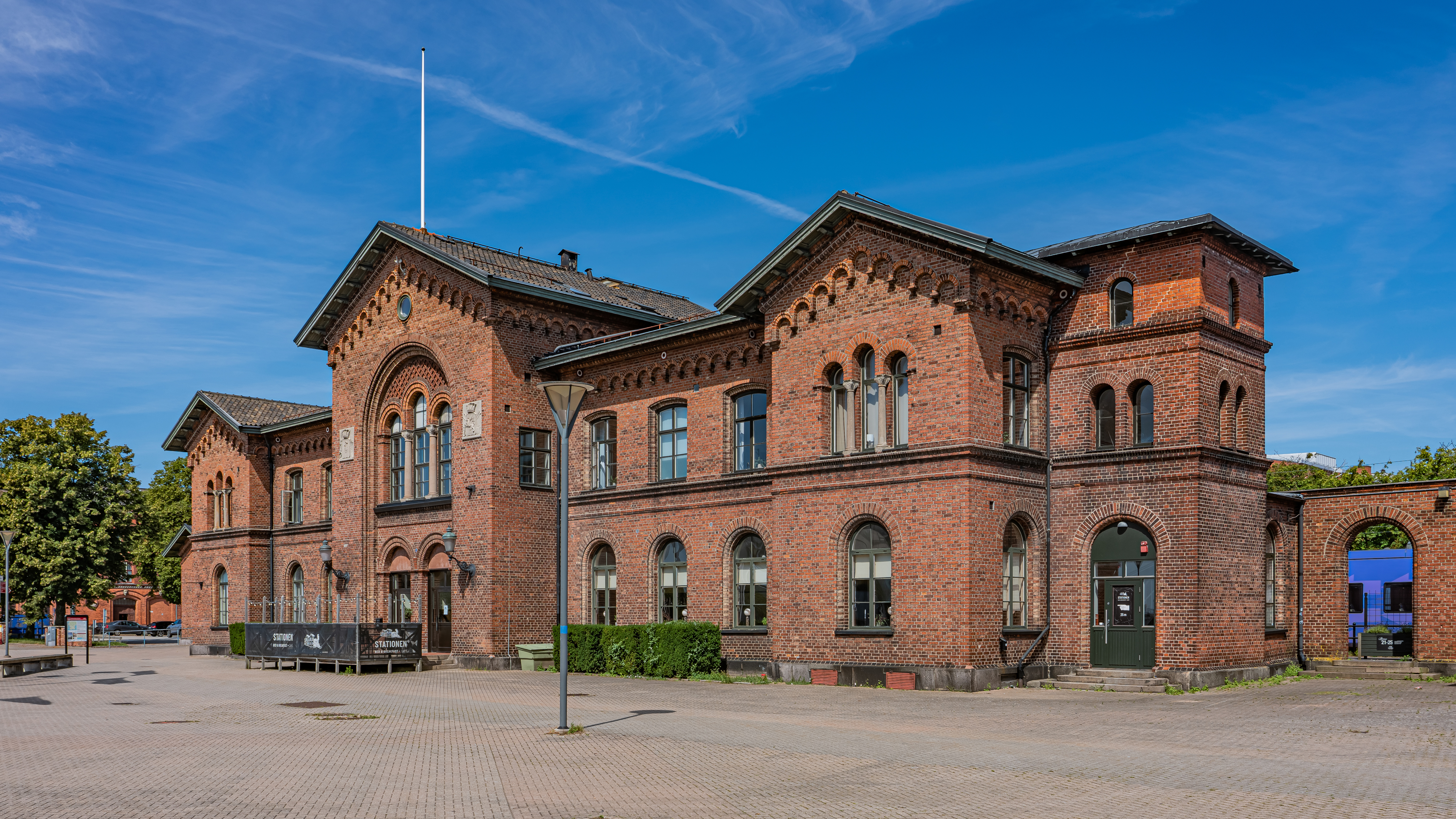

General information
- Elevation: 5 m (16 ft) above sea level
- Manager: Trafikverket
- Transit authority: Skånetrafiken
- Lines: Ystad Line; Österlen Line
- Tracks: 3
- Connections: City bus, regional bus Bornholmslinjen ferry

Construction
- Parking: Yes
- Cycle facilities: Yes
- Accessible: Yes

Other information
- Station code: Y

Services
| Preceding station | Pågatågen | Following station |
|---|---|---|
| Svarte towards Lund C | Line 6 | Köpingebro towards Simrishamn |
Location

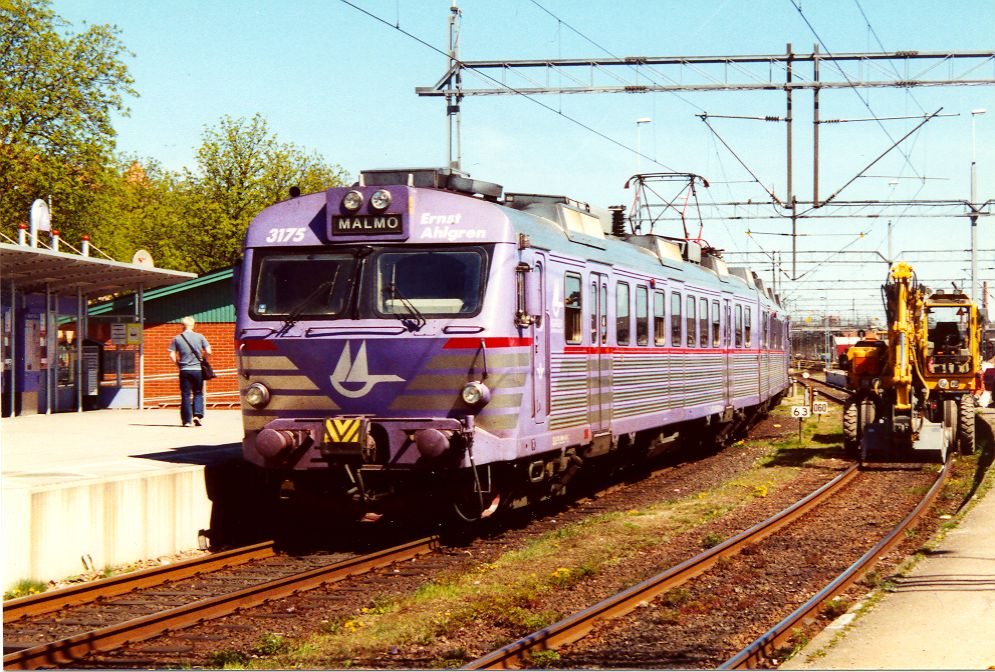
X11 train at Ystad Station

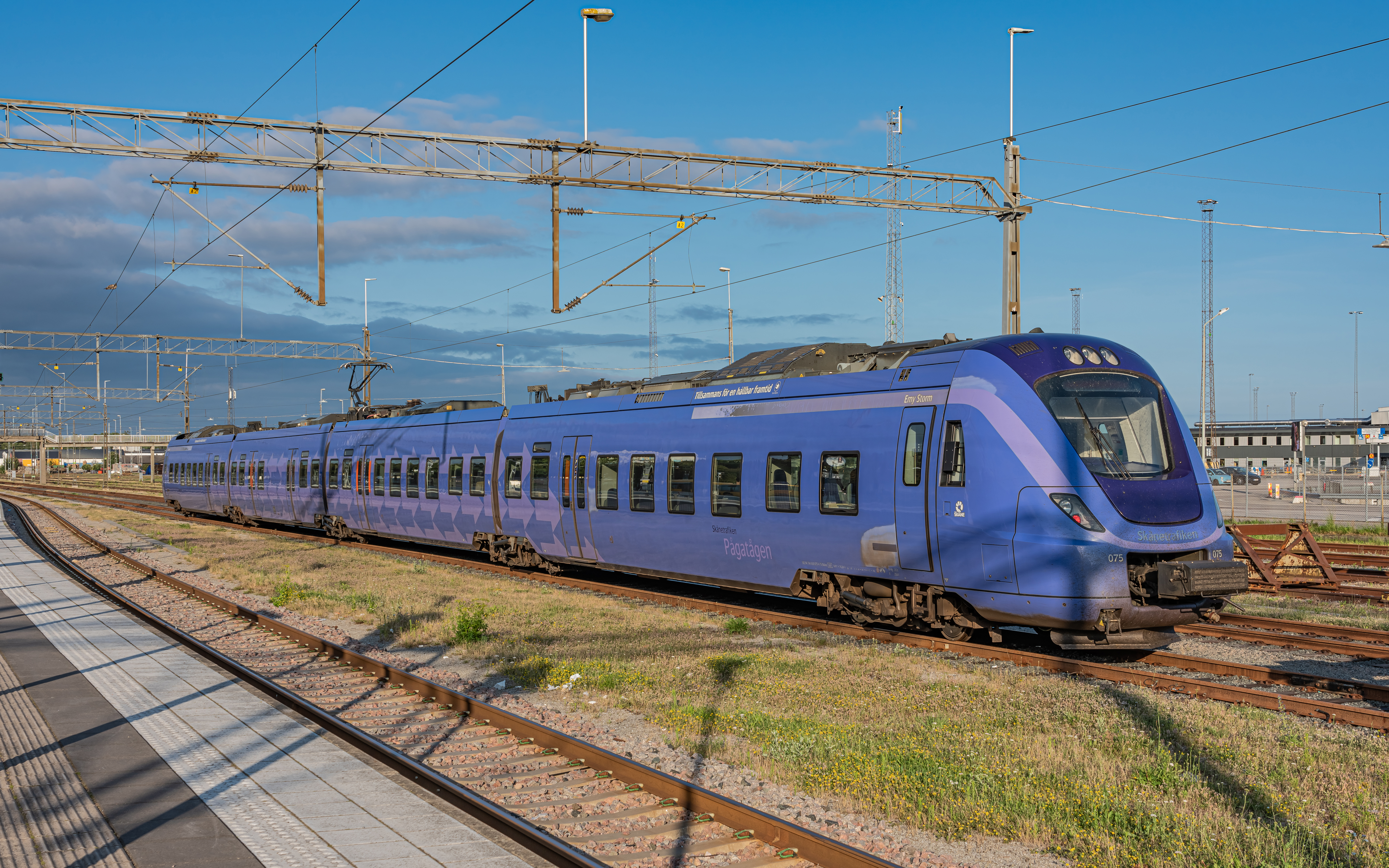
X61 (railcar) at Ystad station

Ystad Station (Swedish: Ystad station) is a railway station which is the terminal station of both the Ystad Line and the Österlen Line. The station is located in Ystad in Skåne County, Sweden, and is served by the Skåne Commuter Rail.

== Service ==
The Skåne Commuter Rail operates a half-hour headway along the line from Malmö using X61 (used to be X11) trains, with some of the services continuing along the Österlen Line to Simrishamn. Travel time to Malmö Central Station is about 45 minutes.

== History ==
The station was established in 1866 as the western terminus of the Ystad–Eslöv Line (which would later become the Österlen Line). The connection with the Ystad Line opened in 1874. The various railways were nationalized in the early 1940s, and from the 1950 Y6 diesel railcars were introduced. In 1985, the SiTY Train was launched between Simrishamn, Tomelilla and Ystad, using Y1 diesel railcars. They were rebranded Österlensaren in the late 1990s. In 1996 the Ystad Line was electrified. In 1997, Malmöhus County and Kristianstad County were merged to create Skåne County, resulting in the Skåne Commuter Rail being extended from Ystad to Simrishamn. Electrification of the Österlen Line started in 2001 and was completed in 2003. DSB did 2000-2020 operate three daily InterCity Bornholm trains from Copenhagen Central Station, which connects with BornholmerFærgen ferries to reach the Danish island of Bornholm, but nowadays this service goes by bus, or train with change in Hyllie.

In 2008, the station was used as a setting in the filming of an episode of Wallander (British TV series).
