= X61 =

X61 or X-61 may refer to:

- X61 (New York City bus), an express bus route in New York City
- X61 (railcar), a railcar of the Alstom Coradia family
- Dynetics X-61 Gremlins, an experimental UAV by Dynetics
- ThinkPad X61, a laptop computer of the ThinkPad X series
