= Ystad =

Town in Scania, Sweden

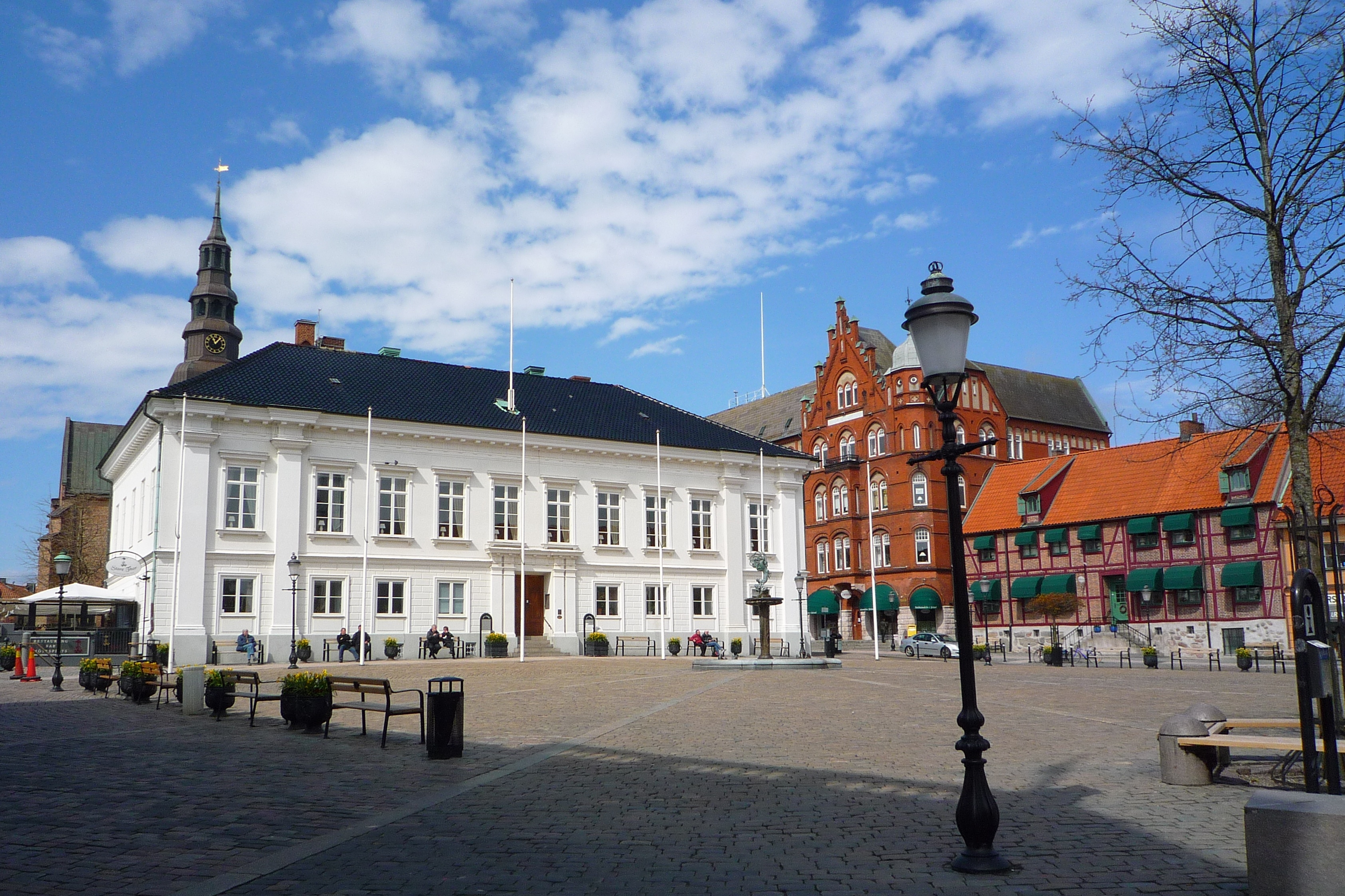
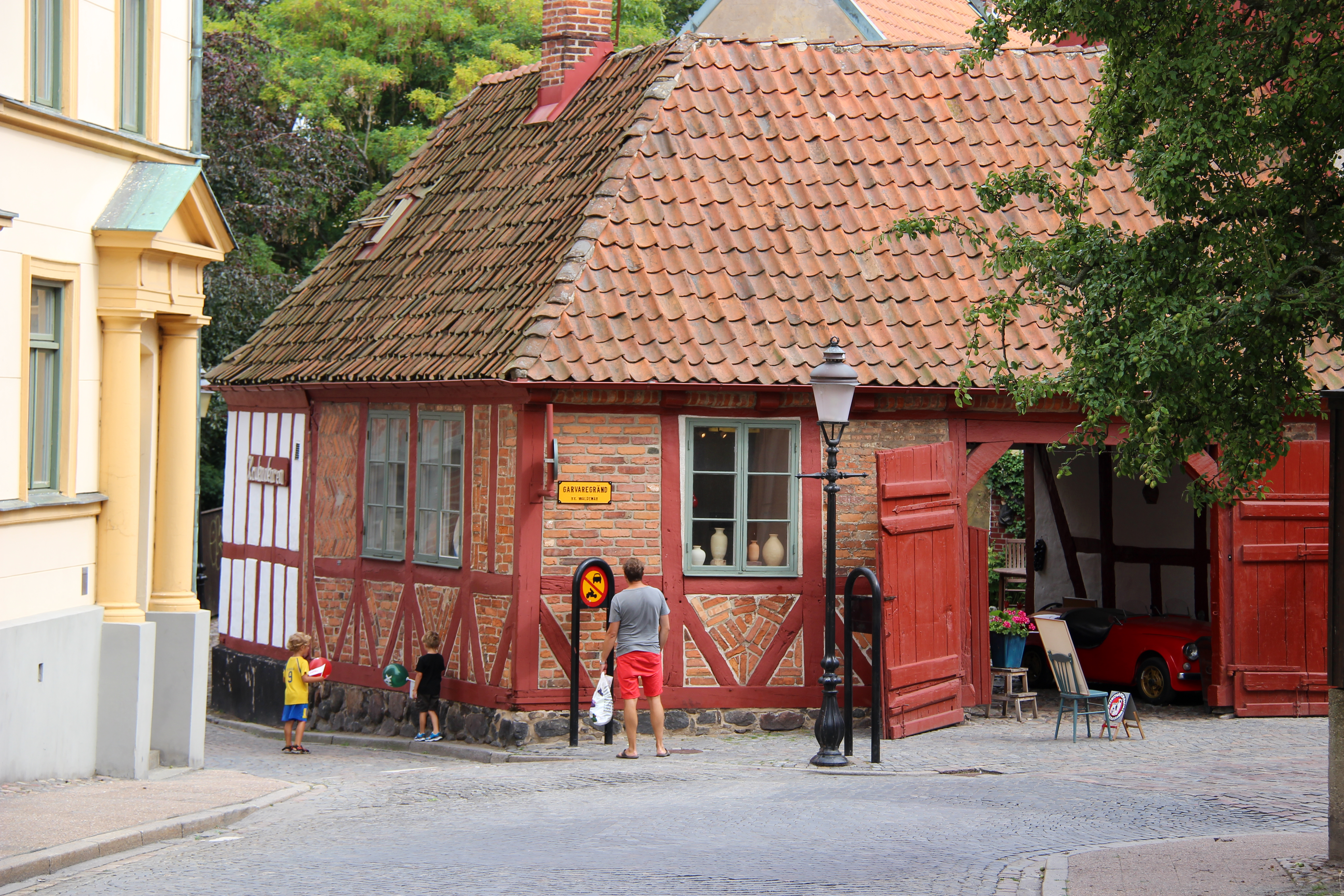
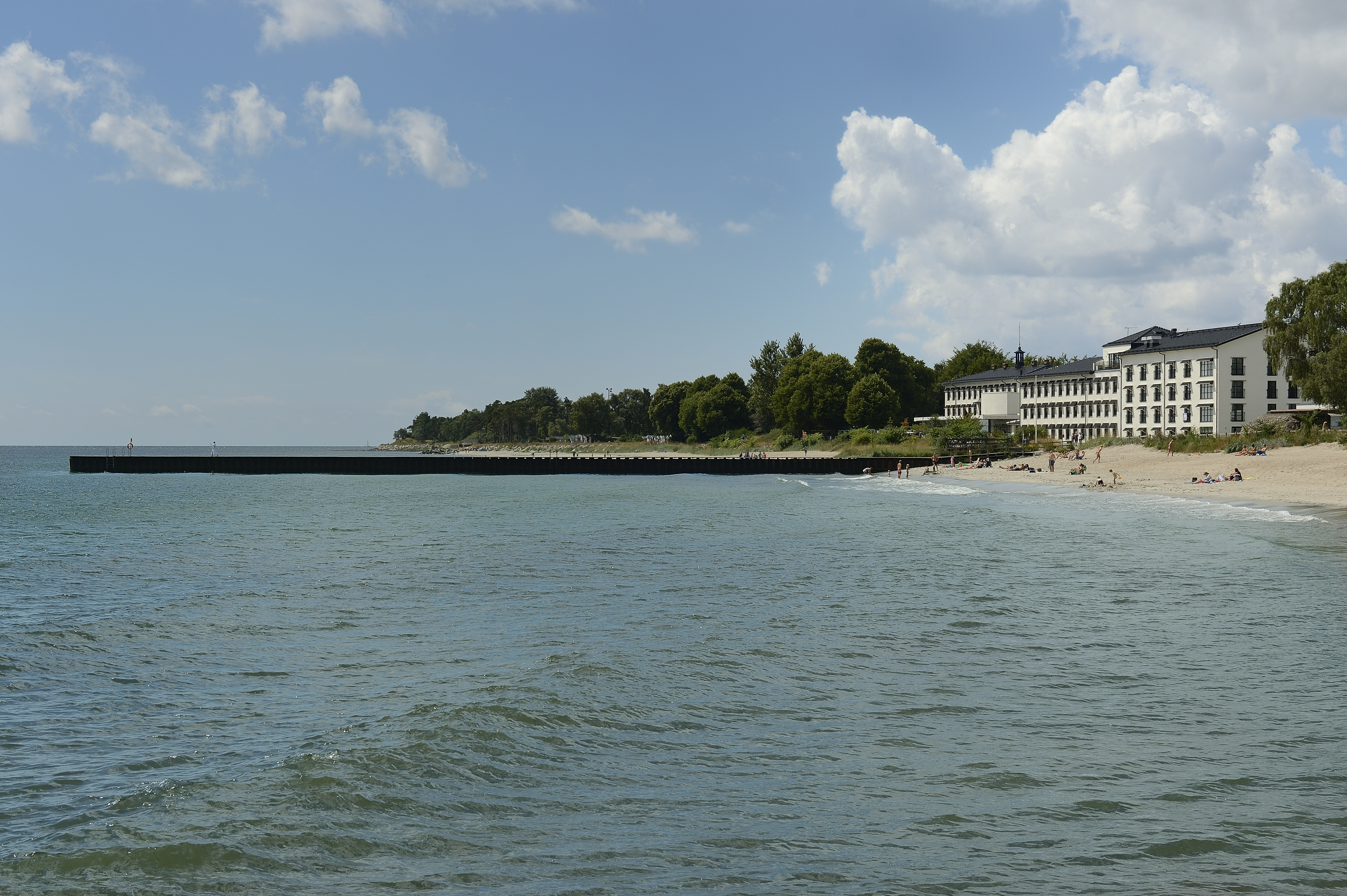

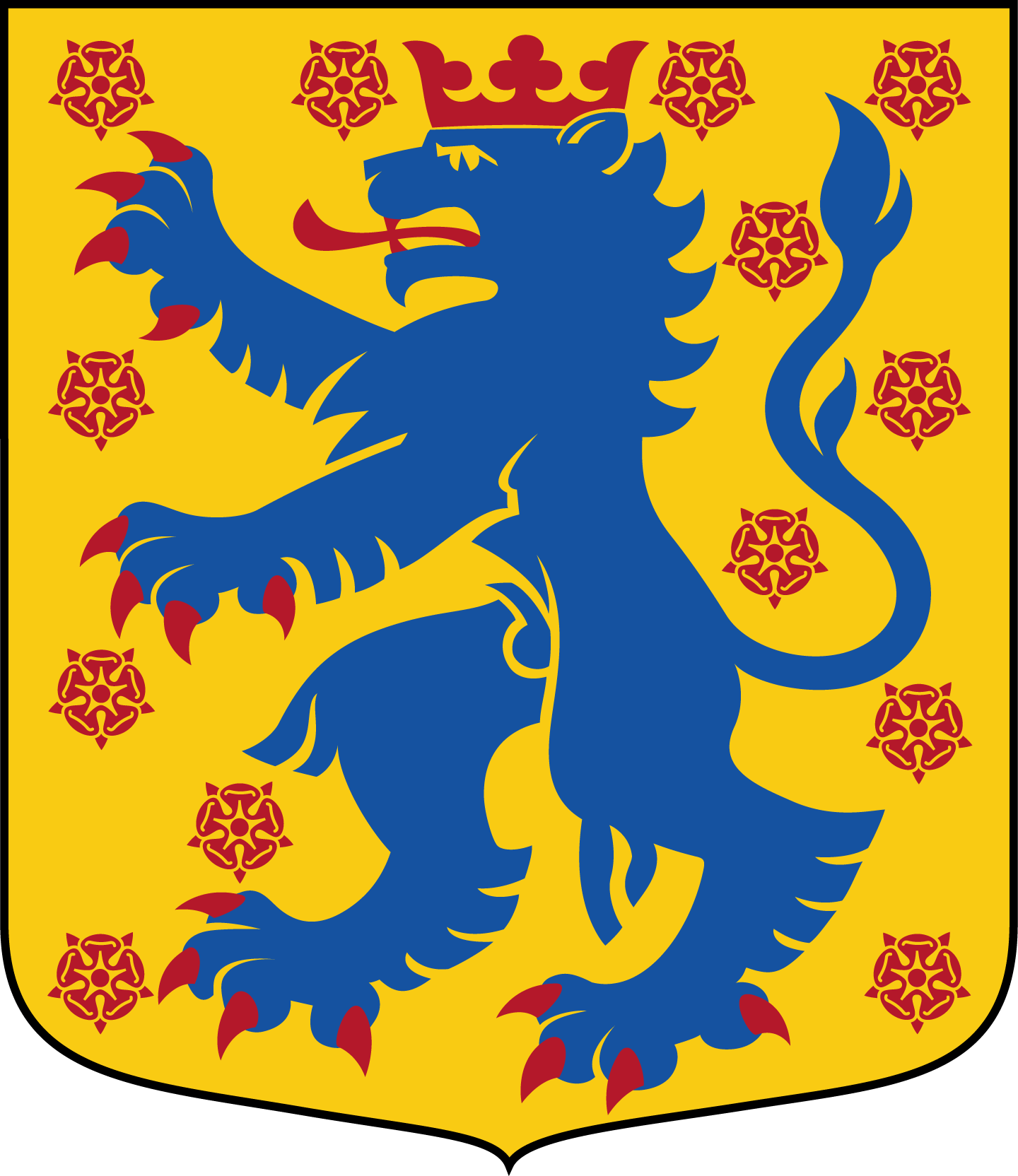
- Coat of arms

- Location within Scania Location within Sweden Location within European Union
- Coordinates: 55°25′N 13°50′E
- Country: Sweden
- Province: Scania
- County: Scania County
- Municipality: Ystad Municipality

Area
  - Total: 8.65 km^{2} (3.34 sq mi)

Population (2021)
  - Total: 31,560
  - Density: 2,120/km^{2} (5,500/sq mi)
- Time zone: UTC+1 (CET)
  - Summer (DST): UTC+2 (CEST)

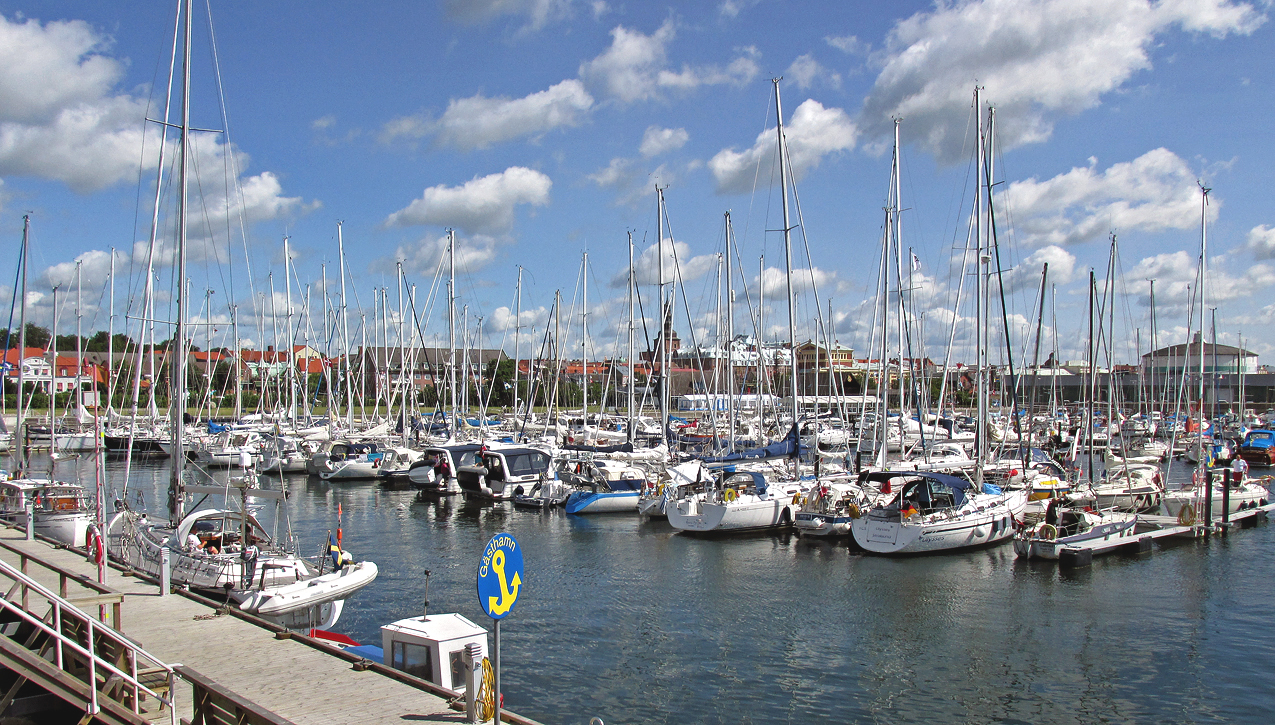
The marina in the summer of 2015

Ystad (Swedish pronunciation: [ˈy̌ːsta(d)]) is a town and the seat of Ystad Municipality, in Scania County, Sweden. Ystad had 18,350 inhabitants in 2010. The settlement dates from the 11th century and has become a busy ferryport, local administrative centre, and tourist attraction.

== Etymology ==
In 1285, the town's name was written Ystath. Its original meaning is not fully understood, but the y probably is related to an old word for the yew tree, while stad means town or stead (with which it is cognate), thus possibly meaning "Yewstead": the place where yews grow.

== History ==
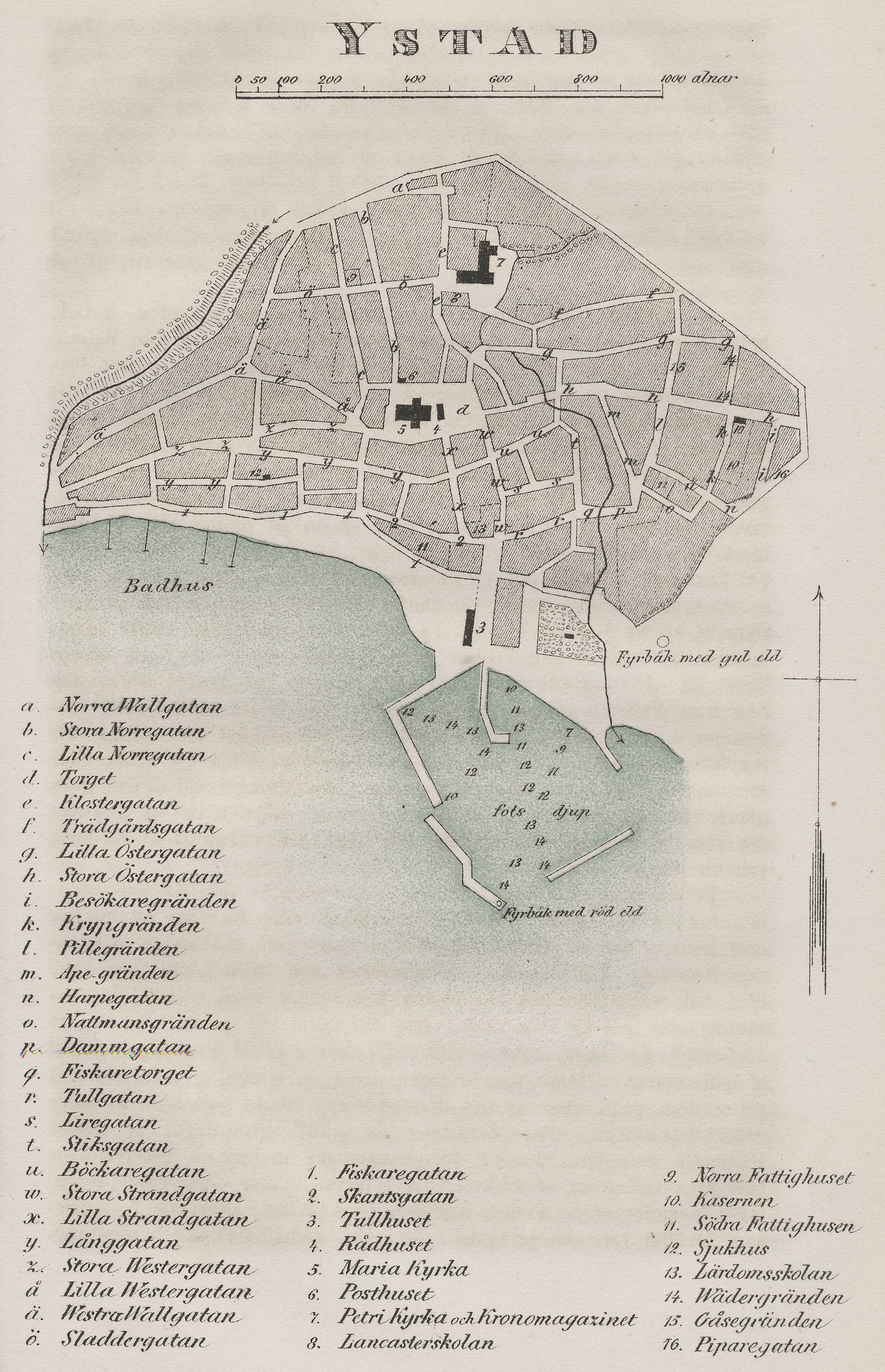
Street plan of Ystad in c. 1850

After the time of Absalon, Bishop of Roskilde and Archbishop of Lund, peace was brought to the area in the 11th century, fishing families settled at the mouth of the river Vassa as herring fishing became the main source of trade. Ystad was not mentioned in documents until 1244, in a record of King Eric's visit to the town with his brother, Abel. A Franciscan monastery, Gråbrödraklostret, was founded in 1267, and Ystad joined the Hanseatic League in the 14th century.

The charter of 1599 gave the town the right to export oxen. In 1644, a Danish fleet was defeated in Ystad's harbor. Ystad, together with all of Scania, was transferred from Denmark to Sweden following the Treaty of Roskilde in 1658.

By 1866 Ystad had a railway connection and it was established as a garrison town in the 1890s. After World War II, ferry services to Świnoujście in Poland and to the Danish island of Bornholm were opened.

== Demographics ==
In 1658, Ystad's population was about 1,600 and, by 1850 it had reached 5,000. The increased importance brought by the railway and the garrison in the 1890s drove the population above 10,000.

== Infrastructure ==
=== Economy ===
Some of the main industries of the town are trade, handicraft and tourism, derived from being one of the best-preserved medieval towns in the Scania province and its association with the Wallander detective novels.

=== Transport ===
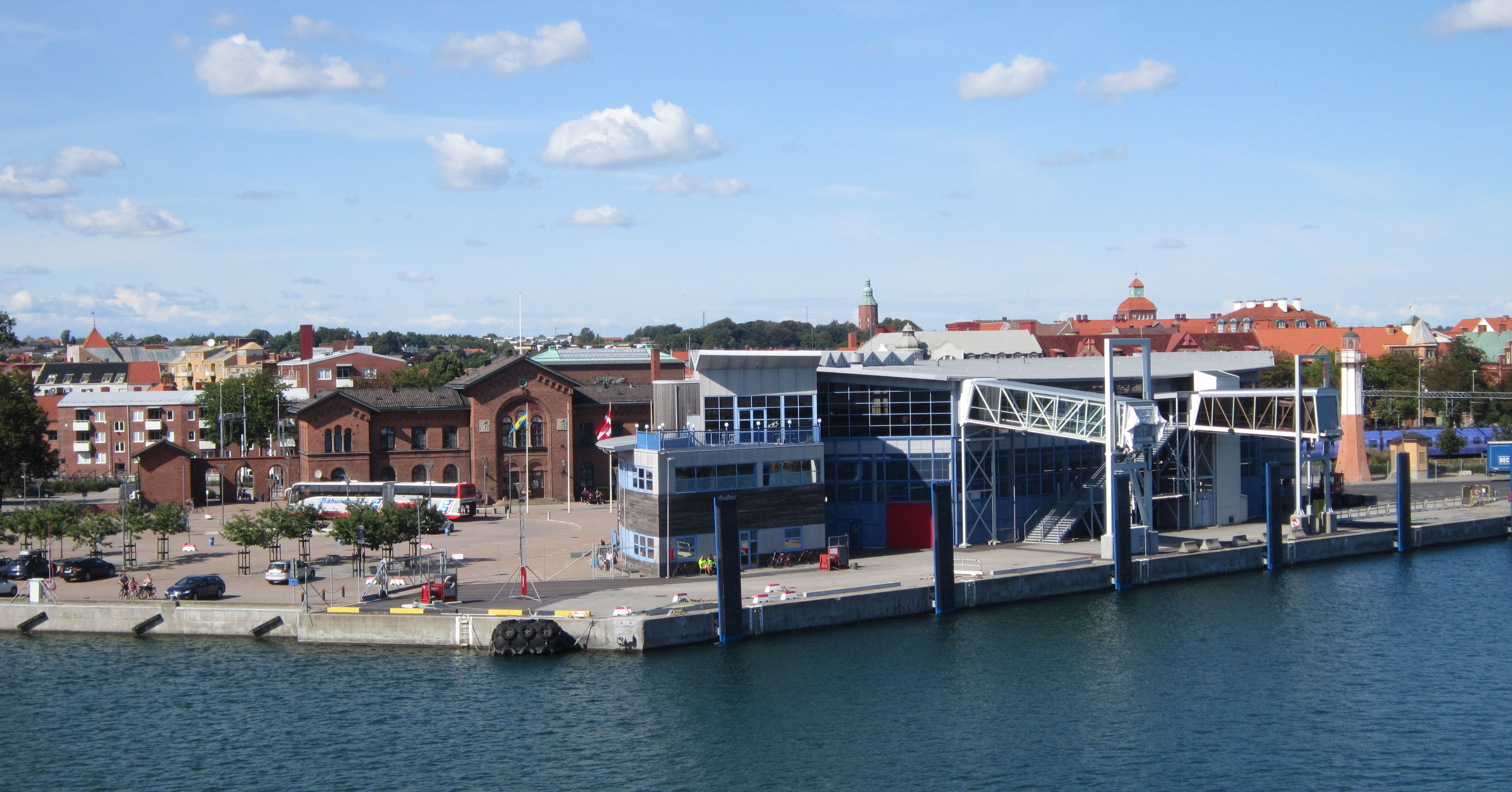
The ferry terminal, and behind it, Ystad railway station

The ferry port has services to the Danish island of Bornholm, to Sassnitz in Germany, and to Świnoujście in Poland, the latter forming part of the E65 road route south from Malmö.

Ystad connects the Ystad Line and Österlen Line railways. Passenger traffic runs between Malmö and Simrishamn (operated by Skåne Commuter Rail). Until December 2017, a direct train service linked Ystad to Copenhagen via the Øresund Bridge (operated by Danish State Railways).

=== Sports ===
The most popular sport in Ystad is handball, with two big clubs. Ystads IF is in Elitserien (the highest Swedish men's national league, as of 2025) whilst IFK Ystad HK is situated in Allsvenskan (the second highest league, as of 2022). Several famous handball players have played for these clubs, including Per Carlén.

=== Media ===
The only newspaper published at present in Ystad is the Ystads Allehanda, which also covers the neighbouring municipalities of Skurup, Tomelilla, Simrishamn and Sjöbo. The newspaper was founded in 1873.

=== Places of interest ===
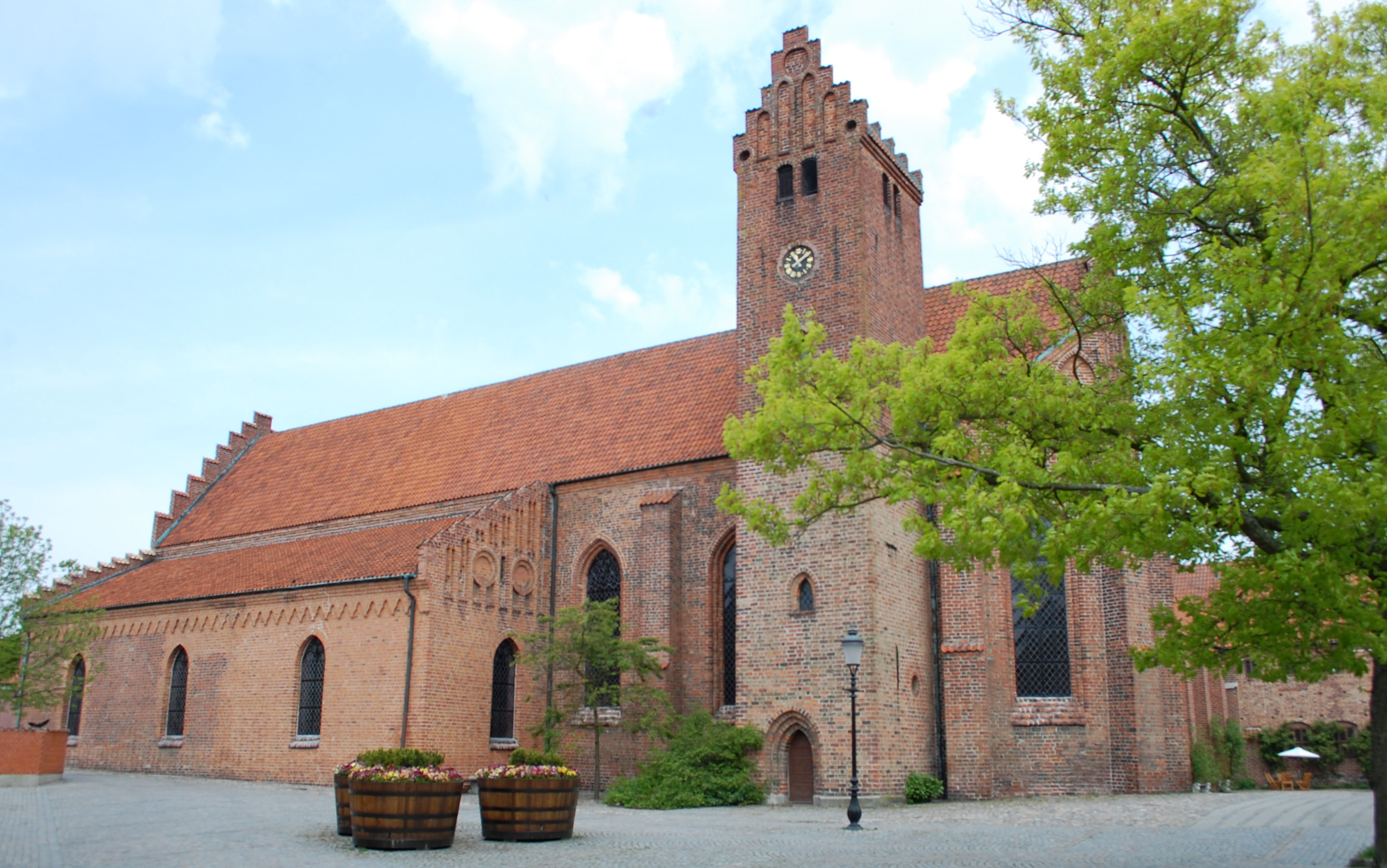
The Greyfriars Abbey

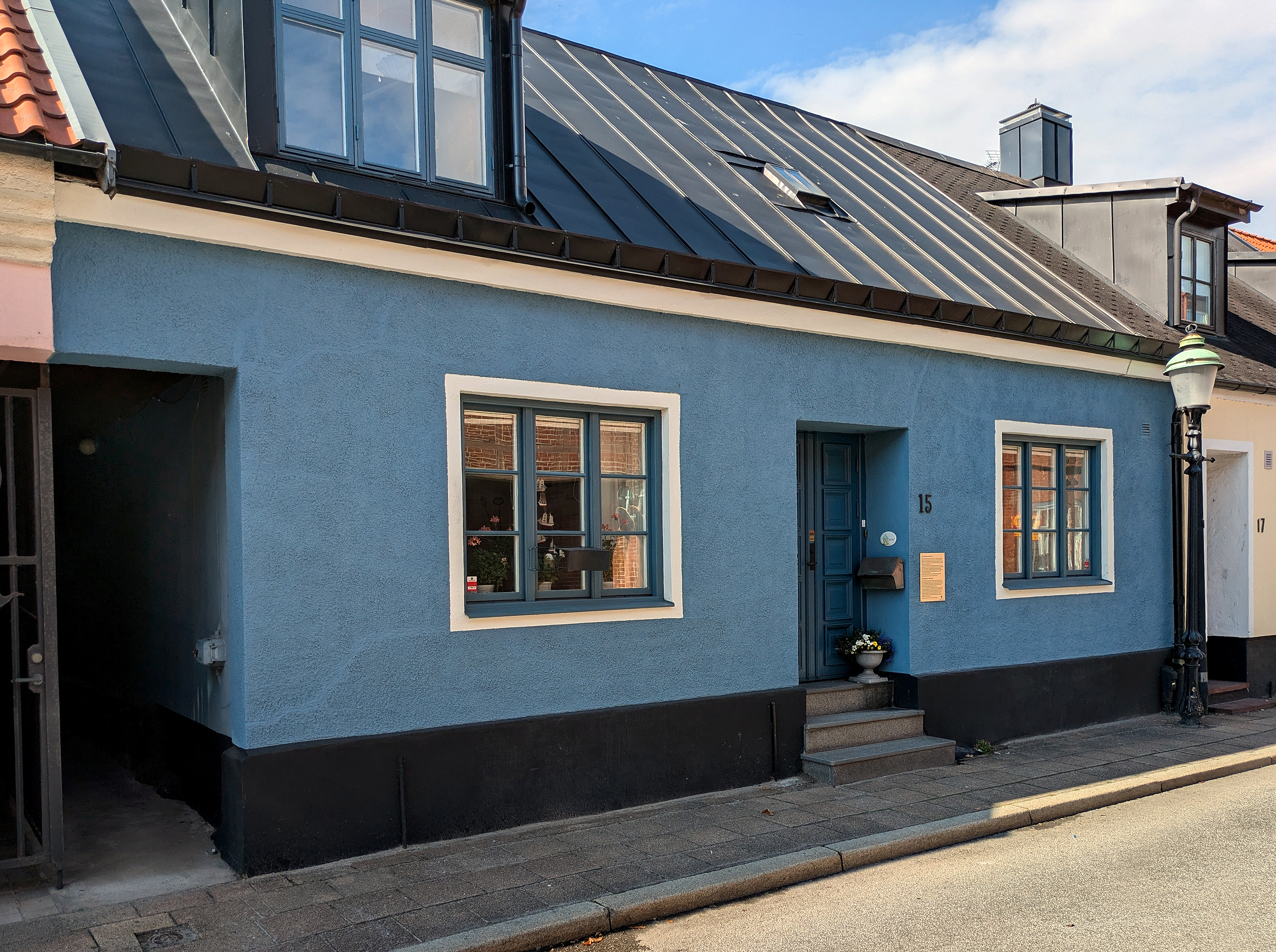
The house where the Swedish-American actress Anna Q. Nilsson was born, Trädgårdsgatan (Garden Street) in central Ystad.

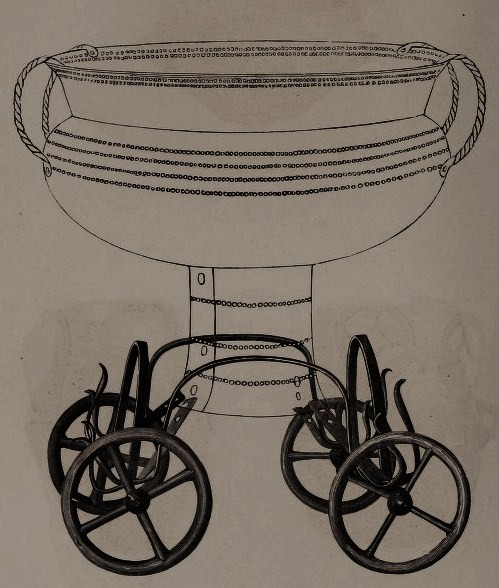
Bronze Age cult wagon model from Ystad.

One of Sweden's best preserved medieval monasteries, the Greyfriars Abbey, lies in Ystad. The town also has an additional large medieval church, the Church of the Virgin Mary (Mariakyrkan). Both are highly influenced by Gothic Hansa architecture (which can also be seen in churches around the Baltic Sea, for instance in Helsingborg, Malmö, and Rostock) and are among the best examples in Sweden of Brick Gothic. In addition, there are areas of surviving medieval town architecture, like the Latin school (built c. 1500) and several townhouses. The city is also included in the European Route of Brick Gothic.

== In culture ==
In his novel Inferno (1897), August Strindberg describes Ystad like so:

The little town to which I now betook myself lies in the extreme south of Sweden, on the seacoast. It is an old pirates' and smugglers' haunt, in which exotic traces of all parts of the world have been left by various voyagers.

Ystad is the setting of the Swedish crime drama Wallander.

== Notable people ==
- Richard Andersson (born 1972), musician and songwriter
- Malik Bendjelloul (1977–2014), documentary filmmaker
- Frank Björklund (born 1960), painter and printmaker
- Axel Fredrik Bjurström (1846–1890), newspaper publisher, businessman
- Rolf Holmgren (born 1946), actor and scriptwriter
- Ernst-Hugo Järegård (1928–1998), actor
- Frans Jeppsson-Wall (born 1998), singer
- Clara Lachmann (1864–1920), patron of the arts
- Börje Langefors (1915–2009), computer scientist
- Lykke Li (born 1986), singer-songwriter
- Sara Li born Sara Linnea Larsson (born 1988), singer
- Gunnar Malmquist (1893–1982), astronomer
- Greta Molander (1908–2002), rally driver and writer
- Anna Q. Nilsson (1888–1974), American actress
- Elin Rubensson (born 1993), footballer
- Michael Saxell (born 1956), songwriter, artist, and producer
- Jahn Teigen (1949–2020), Norwegian singer, musician, and comedian

== Works cited ==
- Munthe, Arnold (1908). Klas Fleming, Karl Gustaf Wrangel, Martin Thijsen Anckarhielm, danska kriget 1643–1645: Omfattande tiden juli–december 1644 [Klas Fleming, Karl Gustaf Wrangel, Martin Thijsen Anckarhielm, Danish War 1643—1645: Covering the period July—December 1644] (PDF). Svenska sjöhjältar (in Swedish). Vol. 5:2. Illustrated by J. Hägg. Stockholm: P. A. Norstedt & Söners Förlag.
