= Malmö Västra Station =

Former railway station in Malmö, Sweden

Malmö Västra station
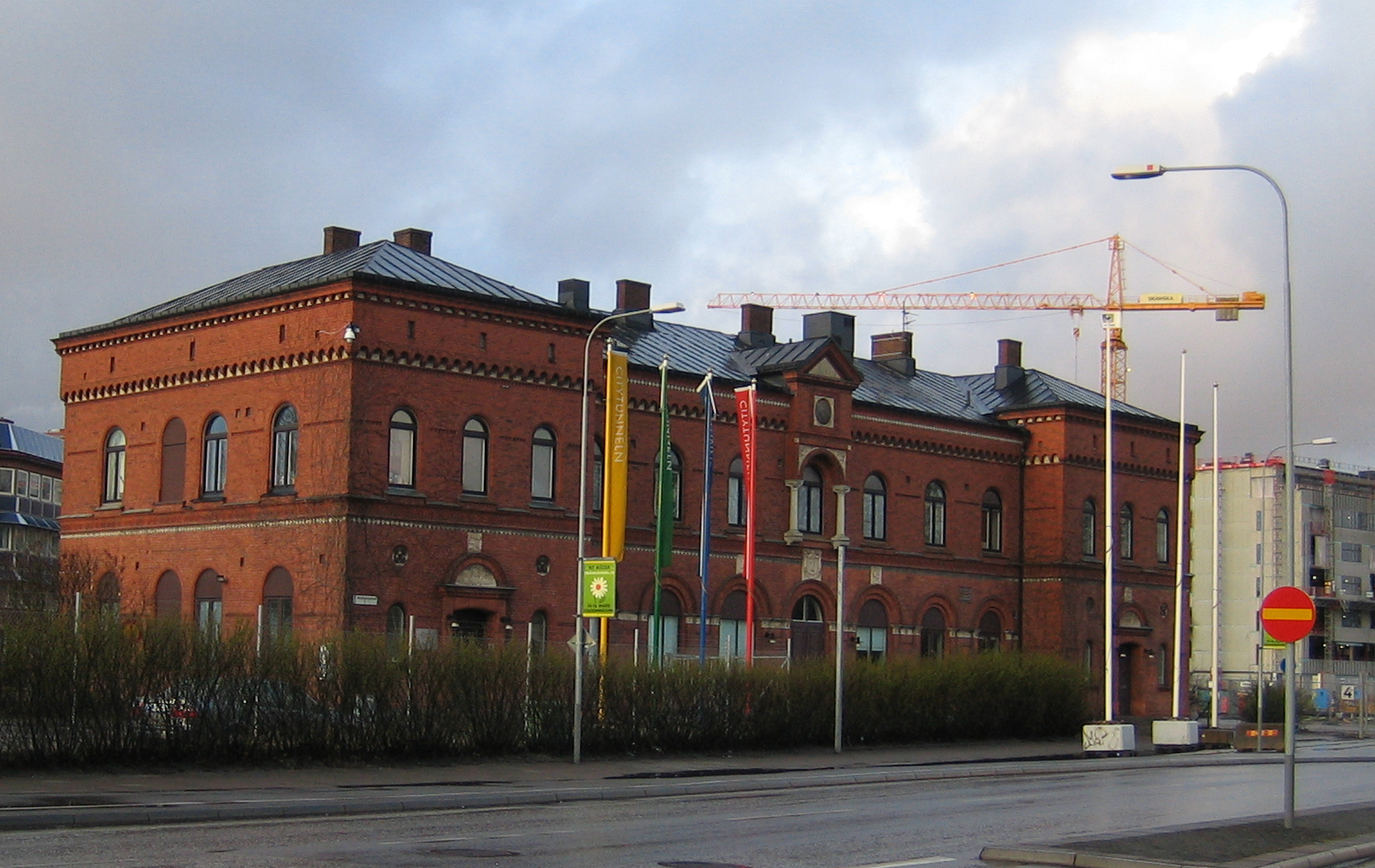
- The station building in 2008

General information
- Other names: Malmö West Station
- Location: Dag Hammarskjölds Torg 1 Malmö; Sweden
- Coordinates: 55°36′29″N 12°59′37″E
- System: Terminal railway station
- Lines: Malmö–Ystad (1874–1955); Malmö–Trelleborg (1886–1955)

Construction
- Architect: Peter Boisen

History
- Opened: 1874
- Closed: 1955
Location
- Location within Sweden Location within Europe

Malmö Västra station (English: Malmö West Station) is a former railway station in Malmö, Sweden. It was established in 1874 with the creation of the Malmö–Ystad Line, and from 1886 it was also used by the Malmö–Trelleborg Line. In 1941, the station was taken over by the Swedish state. A new and larger station building was built and its use as a station ended in 1955. The station building was later used as offices for the City Tunnel project.
