= Ystad Line =

Railway line in Sweden

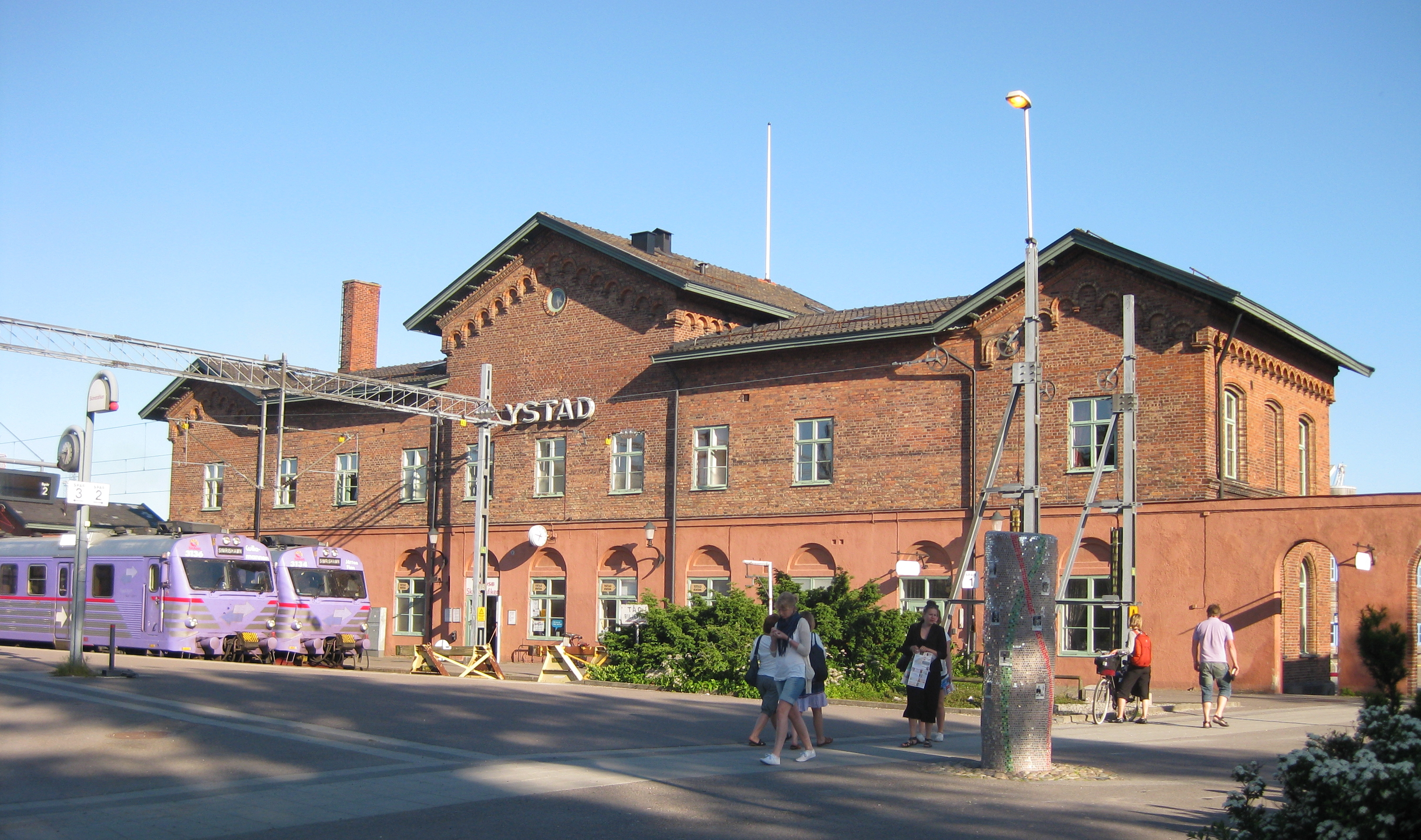
- Ystad Station

Overview
- Owner: Swedish Transport Administration
- Locale: Scania, Sweden
- Termini: Malmö; Ystad

Service
- System: Swedish Railway Network
- Operator: Skånetrafiken

History
- Opened: 1874

Technical
- Line length: 63 km (39.15 mi)
- Number of tracks: Single
- Character: Commuter
- Track gauge: 1,435 mm (4 ft 8 1/2 in) standard gauge
- Electrification: 15 kV 16.7 Hz AC

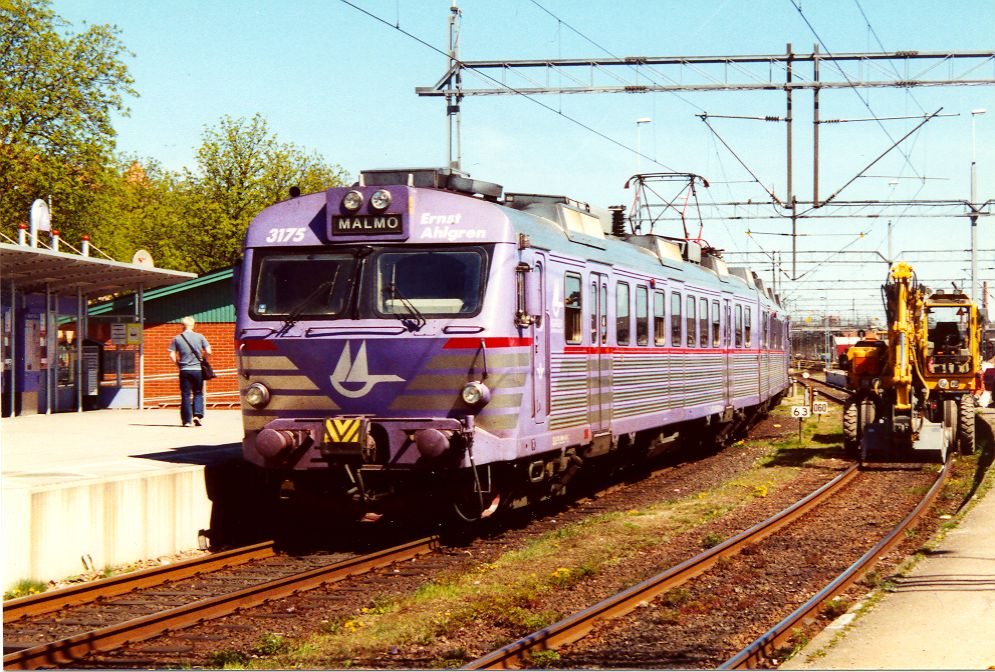
X11 train at Ystad Station

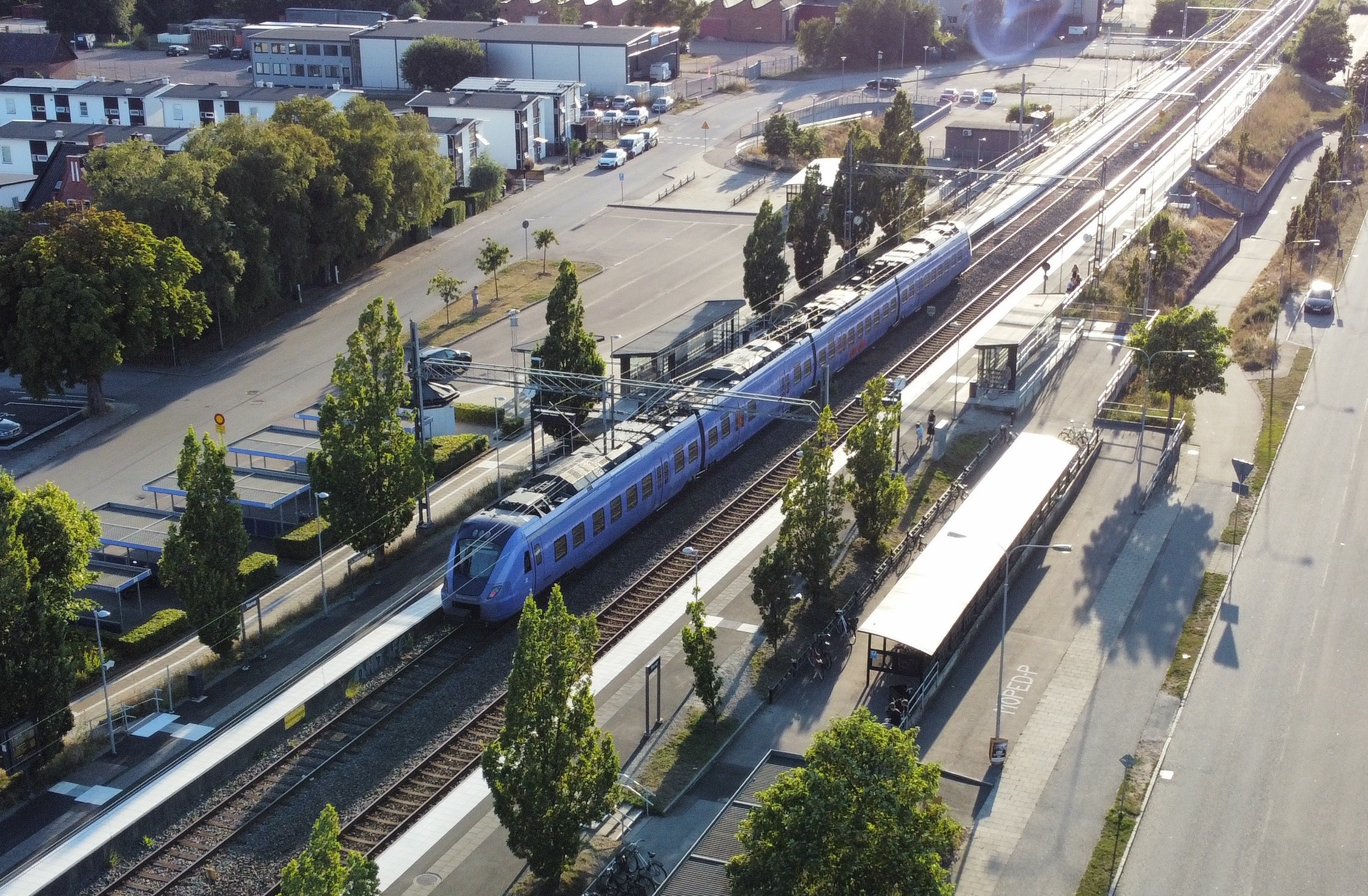
Pågatågen X61 (railcar) at Skurup station

The Ystad Line (Swedish: Ystadbanan) is a 63-kilometer (39 mi) long railway line between Malmö and Ystad in Scania, Sweden. At Ystad, the line connects with the Österlen Line, which continues onwards to Simrishamn.

== History ==
Plans for a railway between Malmö and Ystad were first launched in the 1860s, and in 1872 a railway company was established to build the line. Because the region was regarded as sufficiently wealthy to finance its own infrastructure, the line received no state grants. During part of the planning phase, the line was proposed to be narrow gauge, but this was changed to standard gauge after sufficient funding was granted by Julius Stjernblad.

Construction started in 1872 and the line was finished in December 1874. Because of the many nobles who had financed the line, it was originally known as the Count Line (Grevebanan). Because of the private financing, each manor received their own station, resulting in many stations and slow service. The original speed limit on the line was 30 kilometers per hour (19 mph), giving a travel time of three hours from Malmö to Ystad. At Ystad, the line connected to the Österlen Line, which had opened in 1965. The two lines were merged into a common operating company, Ystads Järnvägar.

The Ystad Line was nationalized in 1941. Diesel multiple units were taken into use in the 1950s. In 1955, the line through Malmö was moved, so instead of operating out of Malmö West Station via Södervärn, the line connected to the Continental Line. The last steam train ran in 1962. During the 1960s and 1970s, several of the smaller stations, including all the manor station, were closed. The line was moved in 1973 to run via Fosieby and the following year, the train ferry between Ystad and Swinoujscie in Poland opened, and the line received a large increase in freight trains. The line was electrified during the 1990s, and the first electricity-powered train ran across the tracks on 8 June 1996. The electrification resulted in increased traffic, and in 2003 a new passing loop was built at Rydsgård to allow increased traffic.

During December 2023 the station Svedala was partially shut to allow rebuilding of the station. This was due to the old station having an island platform that was not accessible. During the rebuild they changed the service pattern slightly so the trains would not have to pass there. As the passing loop was also being rebuilt.On the 14th of December 2024 the work was complete on the station it reopened the passing loop and two new platforms on the day after (15th of December)

== Service ==
The line has mixed passenger and freight traffic. The Skåne Commuter Rail operates a half-hour headway along the line using X61 (railcar) (used to be X11, which were changed between 2009 and 2017) trains, with some of the services continuing along the Österlen Line. DSB used to operate three daily InterCity Bornholm trains from Copenhagen Central Station until 9 December 2017, which connected with BornholmerFærgen to reach the Danish island of Bornholm. In addition, Green Cargo operates freight trains. The line has been proposed as part of the link between Bornholm and Copenhagen, should the Bornholm Tunnel be built.
