= Östervärn =

- Neighbourhood
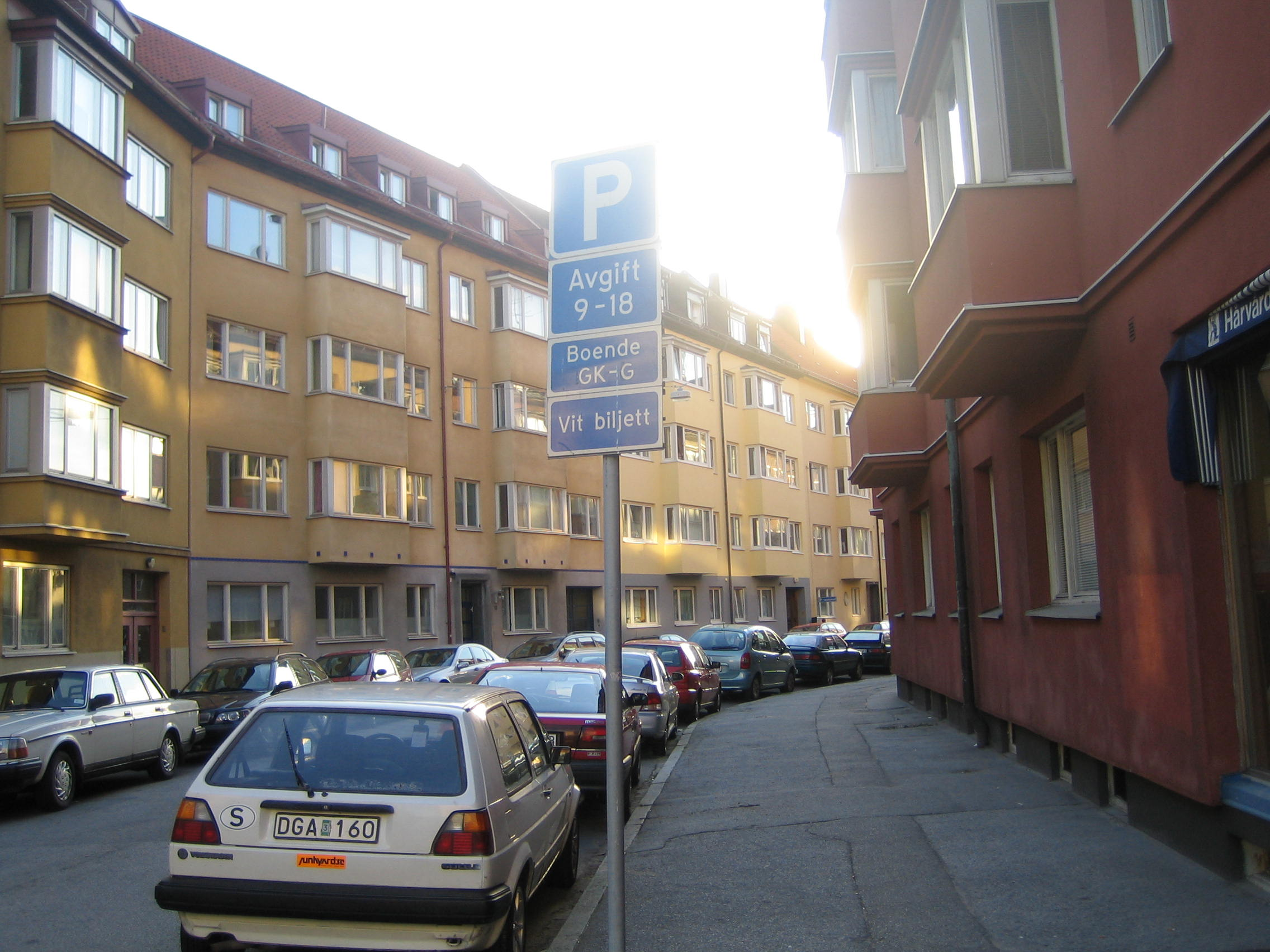
- Interactive map of Östervärn
- Coordinates: 55°36′24″N 13°01′34″E
- Country: Sweden
- Province: Skåne
- County: Skåne County
- Municipality: Malmö Municipality
- Borough of Malmö: Centrum

Population (2021)
  - Total: 3,587
- Time zone: UTC+1 (CET)
  - Summer (DST): UTC+2 (CEST)

Östervärn (Swedish pronunciation: [œstɛrˈvæːɳ]) is a neighbourhood of Malmö, situated in the Borough of Centrum, Malmö Municipality, Skåne County, Sweden.

Östervärn has a railway station of the same name, which serves as a stop on the Malmöringen ring line which local Pågatågen commuter trains operate.
