= Ed Station =

Railway station in Dals-Ed, Sweden

Coordinates: 58.9137°N 11.9331°E

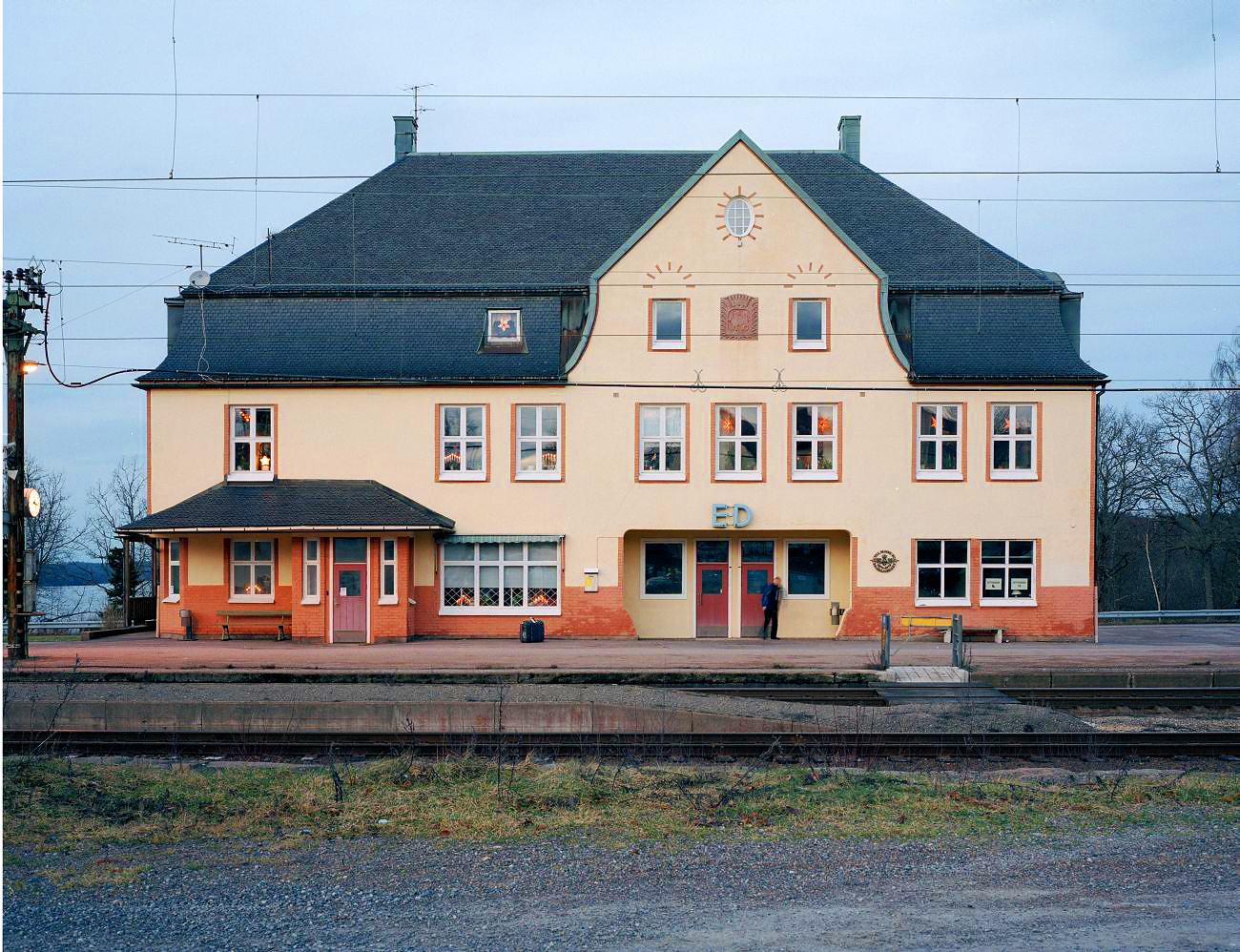
- Ed railway station in January 2007

General information
- Location: Västra Götaland; Sweden
- Elevation: 140 metres (460 ft)
- Owner: Jernhusen
- Line: Norway/Vänern Line
- Platforms: 1
- Train operators: Vy, Västtrafik
- Connections: Bus

Other information
- Station code: Ed

History
- Opened: 1879
Location

Ed is a train station in Dals-Ed, Västra Götaland, Sweden. To the east, the Norway/Vänern Line continues to Gothenburg Central Station. To the west, the Norway/Vänern Line crosses the border to Norway, and continues as the Østfold Line.

The station is located around 200 metres (660 ft) from the midpoint of Ed, accessed through a pedestrian tunnel under the railway. A bus station is located on the town side of the railway.

The municipality has had a train station since 1879; the current building dates from 1912. The waiting room was refreshed in 2023, re-opened with a local history display. Problems with vandalism were corrected and graffiti was cleaned.

== Trains ==
Preceding station	Regional trains	Following station
Halden towards Oslo S	RE20	Trollhättan towards Göteborg C
Preceding station	Västtågen	Following station
Terminus	Trollhättan-Ed Line	Öxnered towards Trollhättan
