= Gamlestaden station =

Railway station in Gothenburg, Sweden

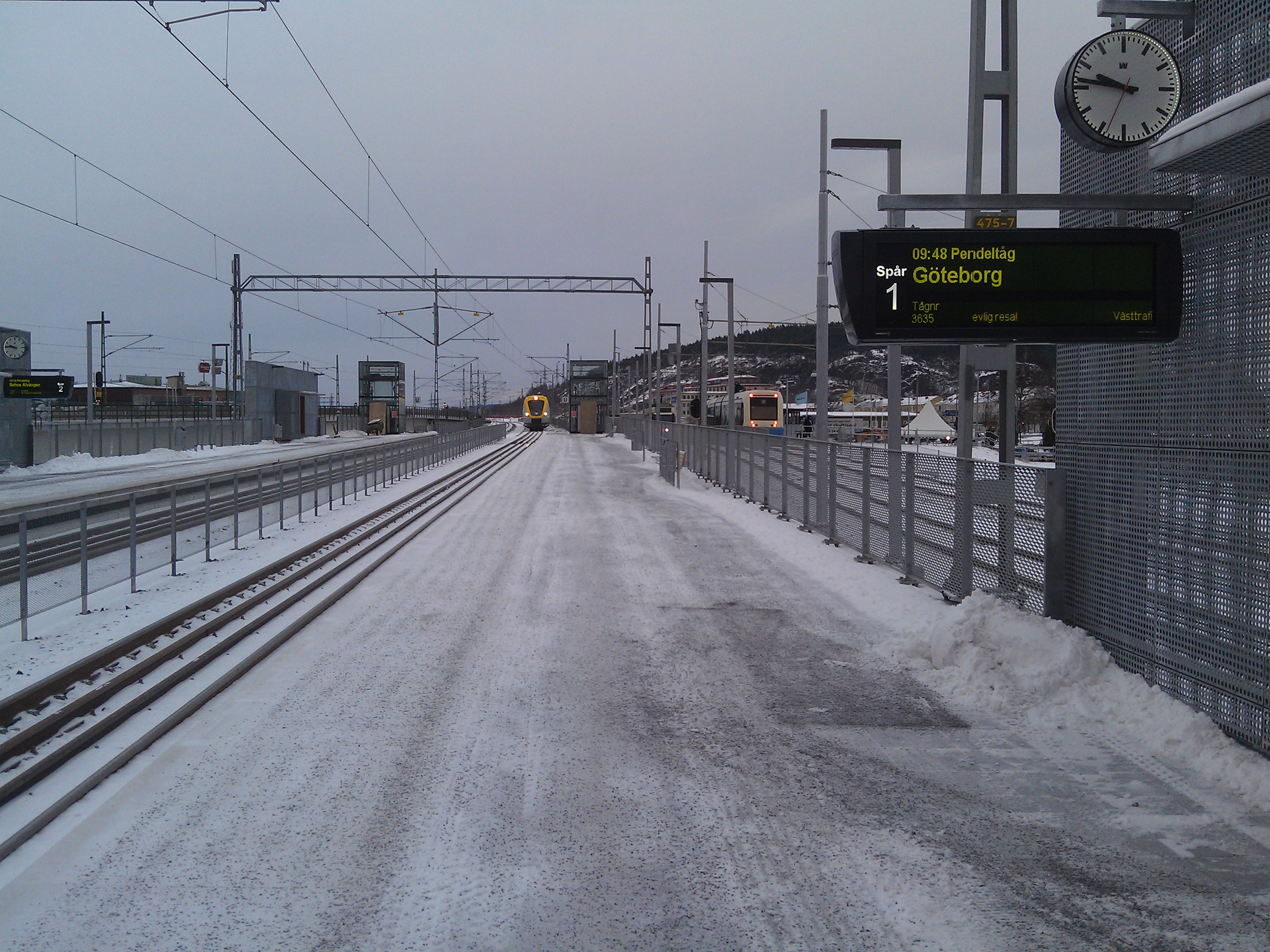

General information
- Coordinates: 57.7271°N 12.0041°E
- Operator: Trafikverket
- Line: Norway/Vänern Line
- Tracks: 2
- Connections: trams, buses

Other information
- Station code: Gas, part of G

History
- Opened: 2012
Location

Gamlestaden station is a railway station located in the suburb of Gamlestaden in the Swedish city of Gothenburg, alongside the Norway/Vänern Line. Opened on December 8, 2012, the station has since been served by commuter trains as well as regional Västtrafik trains between Gothenburg and Vänersborg.

The tram stop Gamlestaden is adjacent to the train platforms.

Preceding station	Västtågen	Following station
Surte towards Älvängen	Gothenburg-Älvängen Line	Göteborg C Terminus
Bohus towards Vänersborg	Gothenburg-Vänersborg Line	Göteborg C Terminus
Trollhättan towards Strömstad	Gothenburg-Strömstad Line	Göteborg C Terminus
