= Trollhättan railway station =

Railway station in Trollhättan, Sweden

Trollhättan
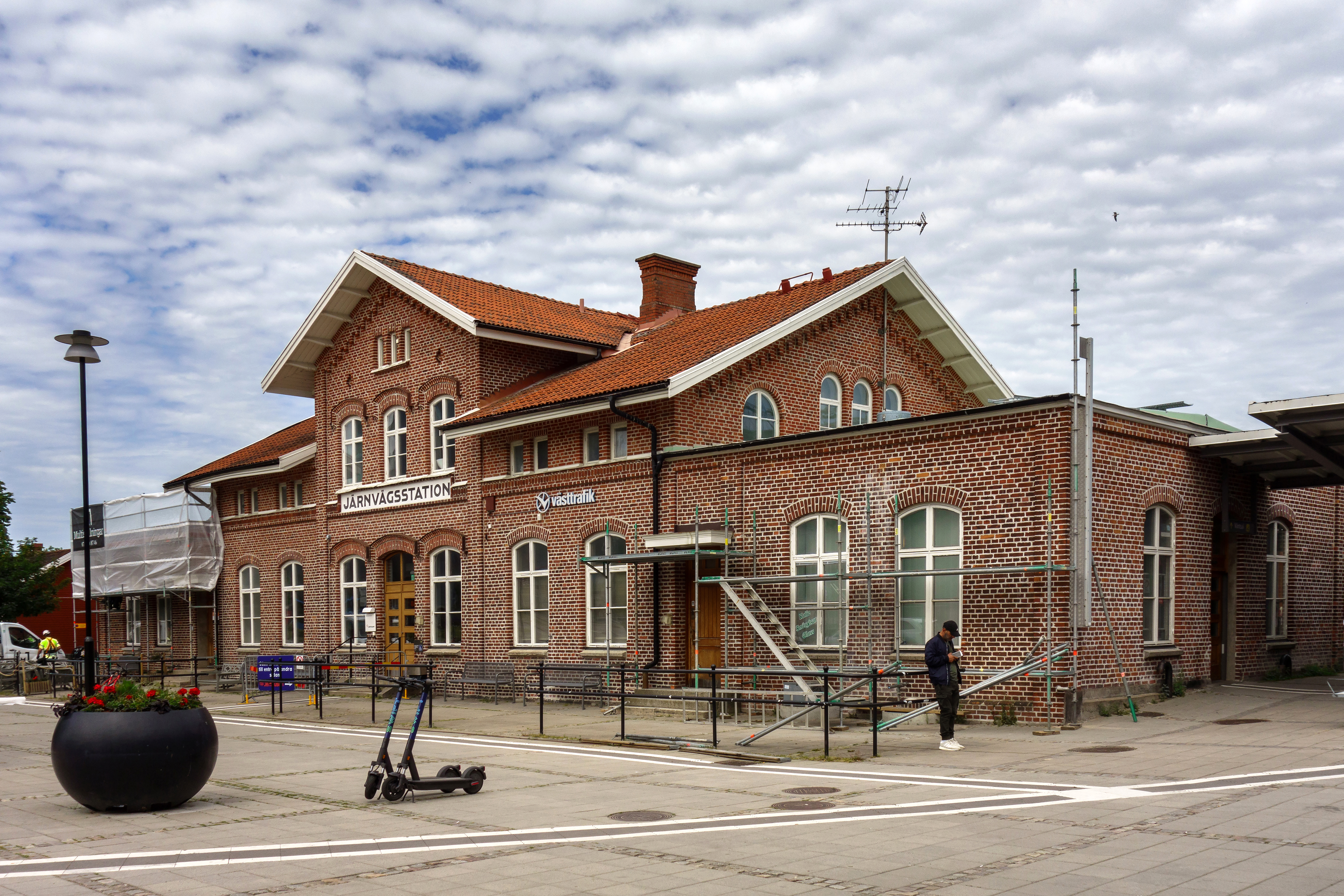
- Station building

General information
- Location: Trollhättan Municipality; Sweden
- Coordinates: 58°17′15″N 12°17′56″E
- Elevation: 45 m (148 ft)
- Owner: Jernhusen (station infrastructure); Trafikverket (rail infrastructure)
- Line: Göteborg-Kil
- Platforms: 2
- Tracks: 3
- Train operators: SJ

History
- Opened: 1877; 149 years ago

Services
Preceding station	SJ	Following station
Öxnered towards Karlstad C	Vänern Line	Göteborg C Terminus
Uddevalla Terminus	Western Main Line and Älvsborg Line	Göteborg C towards Stockholm C
Preceding station	Regional trains	Following station
Ed towards Oslo S	RE20	Göteborg C Terminus
Preceding station	Regional trains	Following station
Öxnered towards Vänersborg	Västtrafik	Lödöse Södra towards Göteborg C
Uddevalla towards Strömstad	Västtrafik	Gamlestaden towards Göteborg C
Öxnered towards Ed	Västtrafik	Terminus
Öxnered towards Säffle	Västtrafik	Lödöse Södra towards Göteborg C
Location

Trollhättan railway station is located in the city of Trollhättan, Sweden, along the Norway/Vänern Line. The station building in brick was built for the original opening of the railway in 1877. There is an adjacent bus station built just before 2000. The station is located around 800 metres (2,600 ft) from the traditional midpoint of the city.
