= Öxnered =

Railway station in Vänersborg, Sweden

Coordinates: 58°21′45″N 12°16′40″E

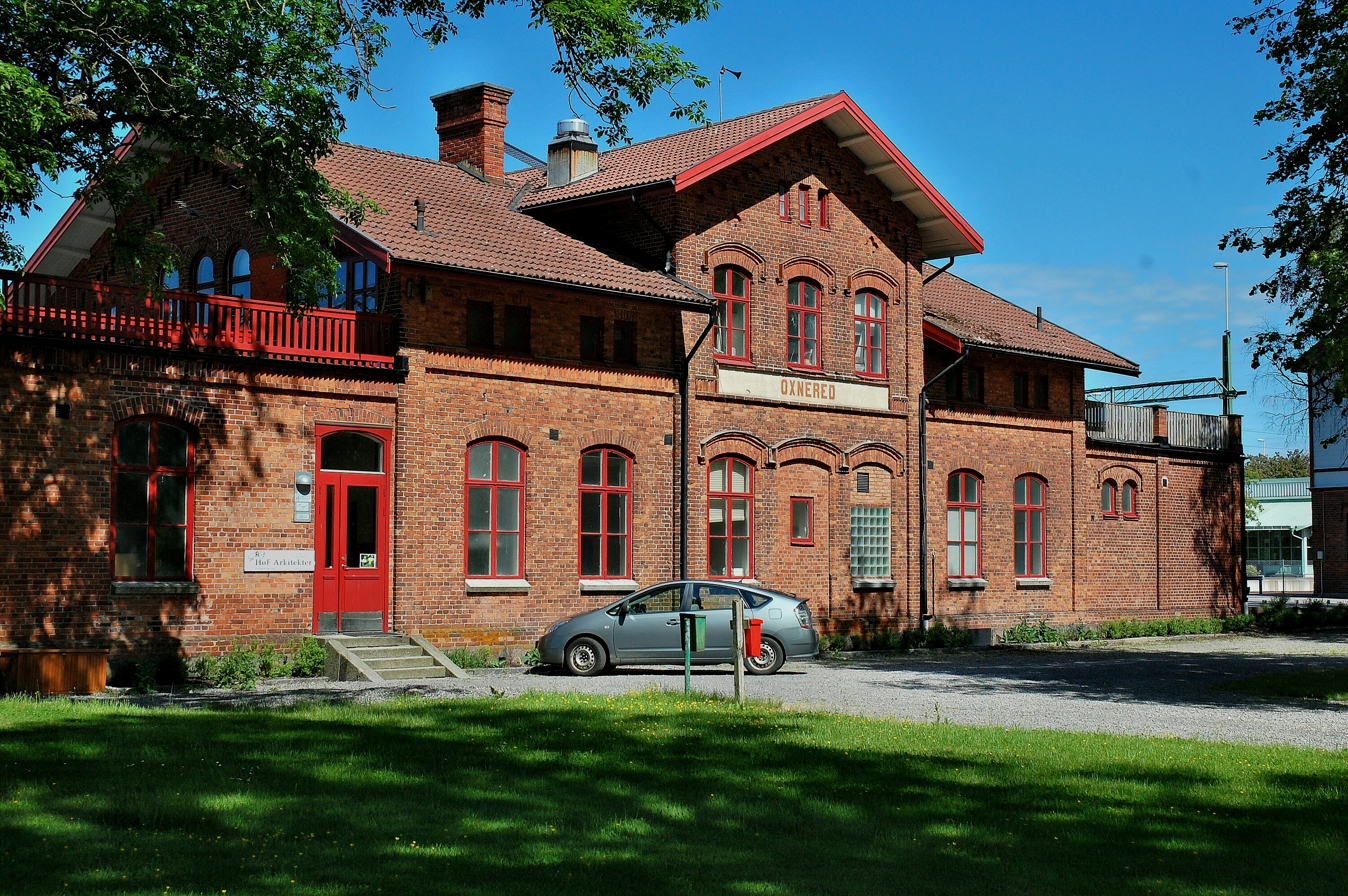
The old railway station building in Öxnered.

Öxnered is a part of Vänersborg in Västra Götalands län in Sweden. It was formerly a separate railway village.

It is located near the E45 road and at the crossing of the Norway/Vänern Line and Älvsborg Line railways. There is a railway station in Öxnered where all passenger trains on both lines stop.

Preceding station	SJ	Following station
Mellerud towards Karlstad C	Vänern Line	Trollhättan towards Göteborg C
Preceding station	Regional trains	Following station
Vänersborg Terminus	Västtrafik	Trollhättan towards Gothenburg Central
Uddevalla Terminus	Västtrafik	Vänersborg towards Varberg
Ed Terminus	Västtrafik	Trollhättan Terminus
