= Halmstad Central Station =

Railway station in Halmstad, Sweden

Halmstad C
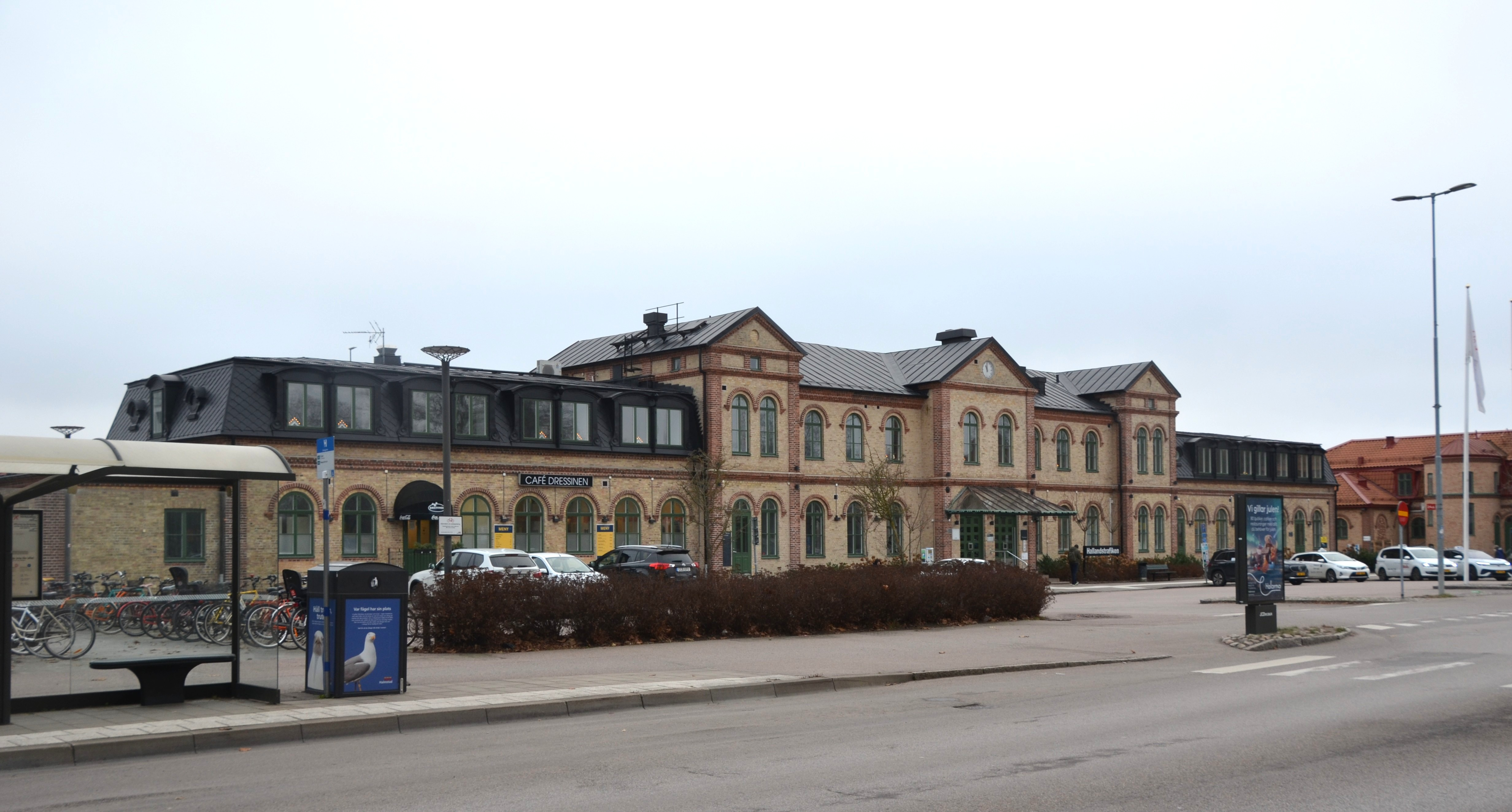
- Station building

General information
- Location: Halmstad Municipality; Sweden
- Coordinates: 56°40′9″N 12°51′52″E
- Elevation: 4 m (13 ft)
- Owner: Jernhusen (station infrastructure); Trafikverket (rail infrastructure)
- Lines: Lund-Göteborg; Halmstad-Nässjö, Torup-Hyltebruk
- Platforms: 3
- Tracks: 4
- Train operators: SJ

History
- Opened: 1886; 140 years ago

Services
Preceding station	SJ	Following station
Varberg C towards Göteborg C	West Coast Line	Helsingborg C towards Malmö C
Preceding station	Vy Tåg	Following station
Varberg towards Oslo	Vy regional	Helsingborg C towards Malmö C
Preceding station	Øresundståg	Following station
Falkenberg towards Göteborg C	Copenhagen–Gothenburg Øresundståg	Laholm towards Østerport
Preceding station	Pågatågen	Following station
Terminus	Line 2B	Laholm towards Helsingborg C
Preceding station	Regional trains	Following station
Sannarp towards Nässjö C	Krösatågen	Terminus
Location

Halmstad Central Station (Swedish: Halmstads centralstation) is located in Halmstad, Sweden, at the West Coast Line and the endpoints of the Halmstad-Nässjö Line and the Markaryd Line. The station is located around 700 metres (2,300 ft) from the traditional midpoint of the city. Regional and city buses stop nearby.

== Trains ==
Fast trains and the regional express "Öresundståg" along the coast stop here. Regional trains also go towards Nässjö.

== History ==
Railway traffic started in Halmstad in 1867 when the railway towards Nässjö started traffic. The railway along the coast was built slightly later.

A basically new high-speed railway has been built along the coast after 1980. It has an entirely new route north from Halmstad; the old one went through Gullbrandstorp. The route south from Halmstad is same as the old route until Eldsberga.

The station building is from year 1886.

There are plans to lengthen platforms, build pedestrian bridges (the middle platform is at present accessed over a level crossing) and rebuild tracks.

== Nearby area ==
Multiple hotels are located next to Halmstad Central Station, including Grand Hotel. The area around the station is earmarked for major redevelopment named "Stationsstaden".
