= Bergslagen Line =

Railway line in Sweden

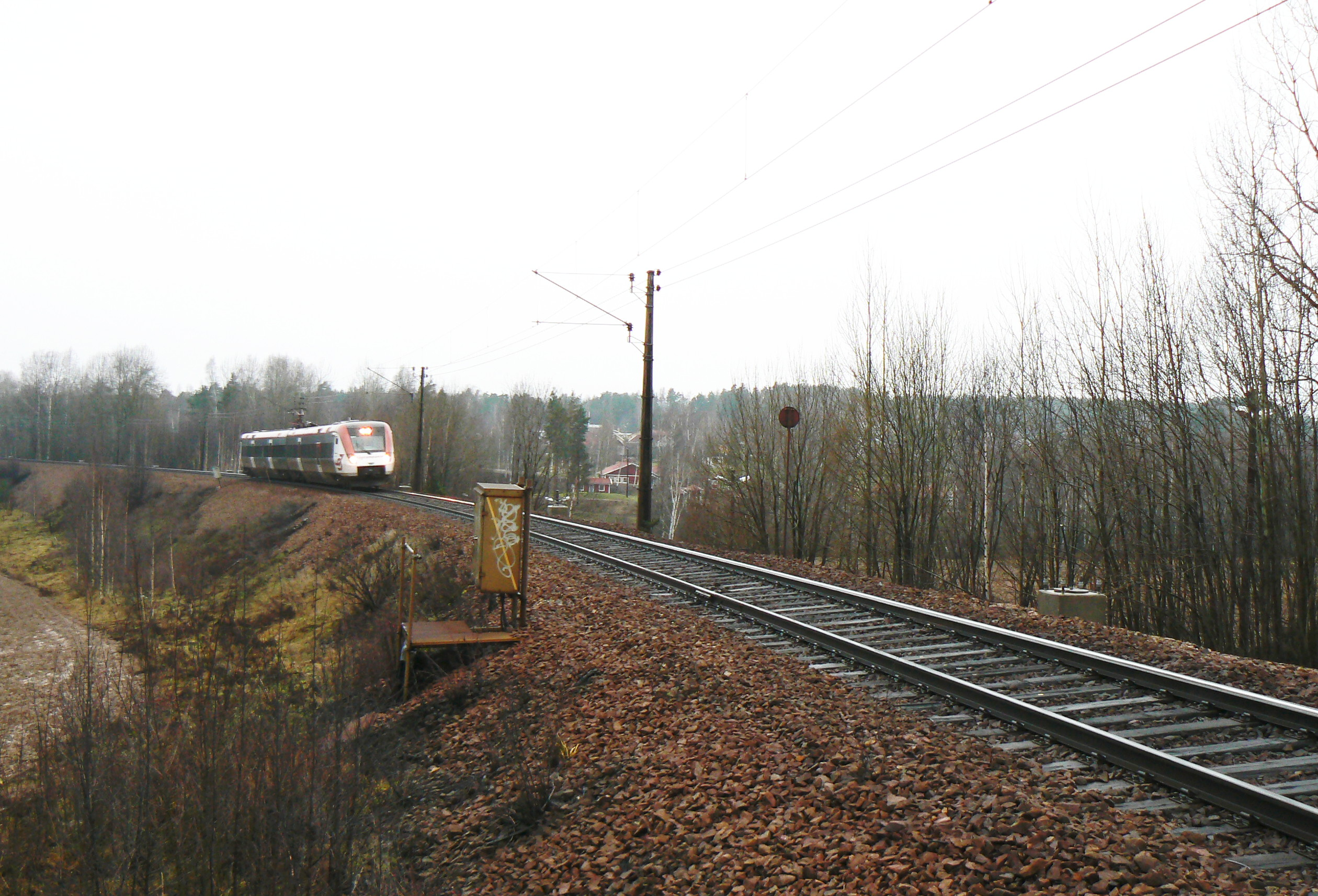
- Regina train near Falun

Overview
- Native name: Bergslagsbanan
- Owner: Sweden
- Termini: Kil/Frövi; Gävle Central
- Connecting lines: Värmland Line; Fryksdal Line; Norway/Vänern Line; Inland Line; Mälaren Line; Bergslagen estate route Bergslagspendeln; Dala Line; Grycksbobanan; Northern Main Line; East Coast Line

Service
- Operator(s): SJ AB; Green Cargo; TÅGAB

History
- Opened: 1877 (Kil-Ställdalen); 1879 (entire line)

Technical
- Line length: 478 km (297 mi)
- Number of tracks: Single-track, double-track (Grängesberg-Ställdalen & Hagaström-Gävle)
- Track gauge: 1,435 mm (4 ft 8 1/2 in)
- Electrification: Yes
- Operating speed: 140 km/h (90 mph)
- Signalling: Yes

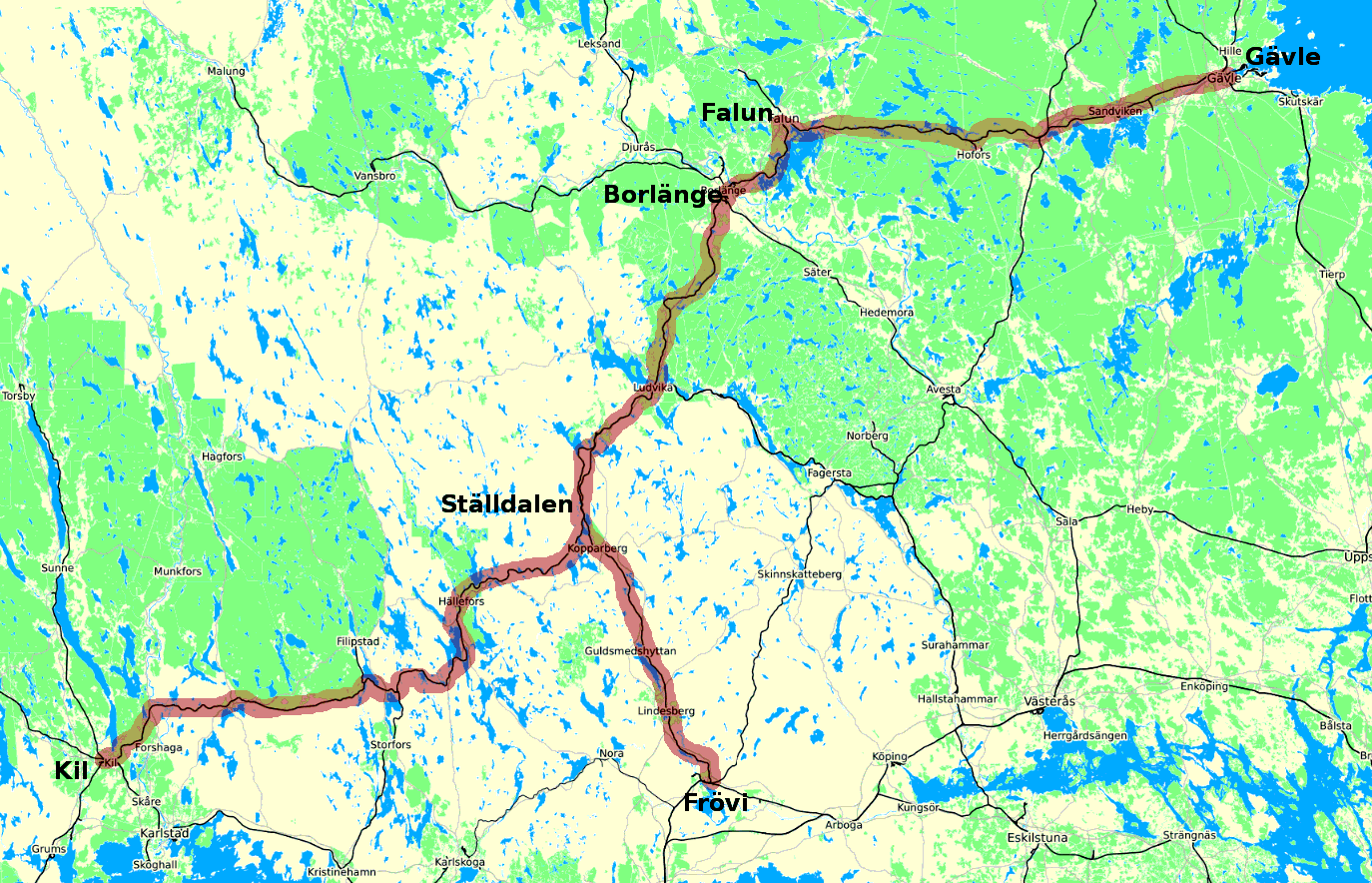

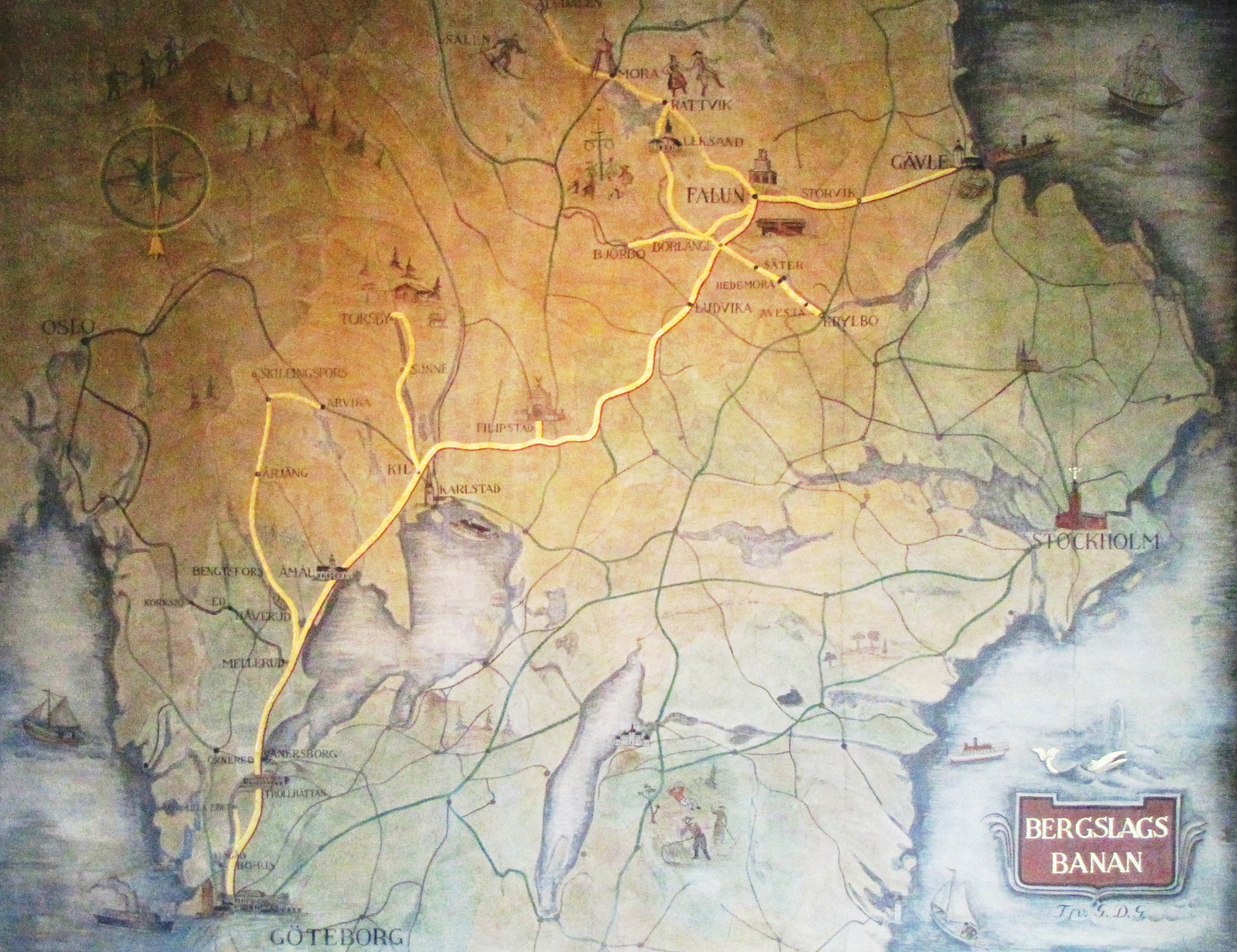
Map in Gothenburg station

The Bergslagen Line (Swedish: Bergslagsbanan) is a railway line consisting of two sections, from Gävle via Falun, Ställdalen to Kil, Värmland, and from Ställdalen to Frövi. Although not officially, the Norway/Vänern Line is also often regarded part of the Bergslagen Line, because it was before the renaming 1990. Construction began in 1855 and the line opened in 1879.

At Kil, the line connects with the Norway/Vänern Line, the Fryksdal Line and the Värmland Line. At Borlänge, it connects to the Dala Line, at Frövi to the Freight Line through Bergslagen, and in Gävle with the Northern Main Line and the East Coast Line.

== Usage ==
Between Gävle and Frövi, Tåg i Bergslagen run regional trains hourly in each direction using the Regina. Trains continue from Frövi south to Örebro and Mjölby.

Between Ställdalen and Kil, the line is used more sparsely. Tågab runs a passenger train a day in each direction most days between Kristinehamn and Falun. The line between Nykroppa and Kil is rarely used for passenger traffic.

Freight traffic is more frequent, especially with trains coming from the North and heading south towards Gothenburg, Värmland or west into Norway and vice versa.
