= Kungälv resecentrum =

Bus station

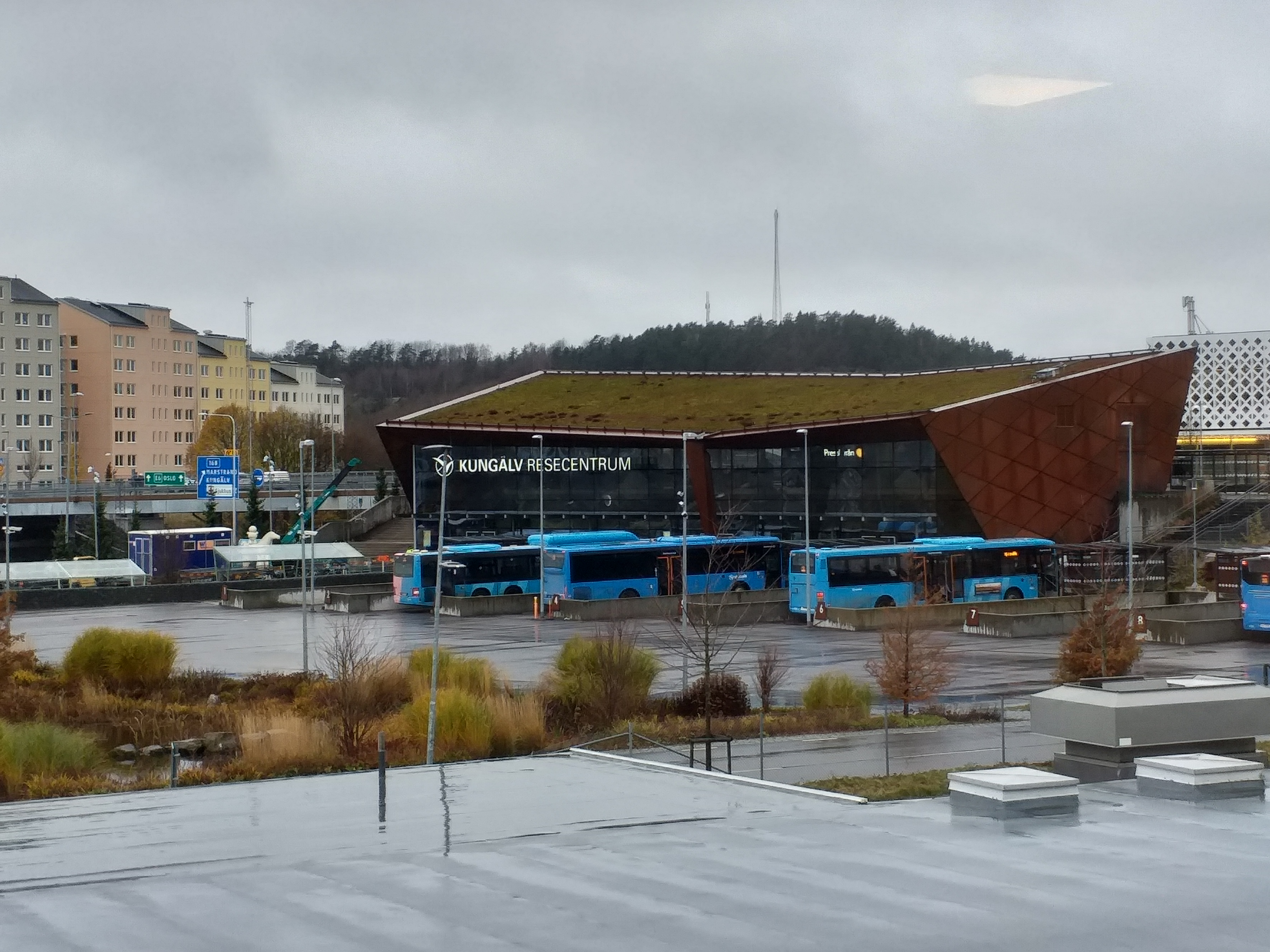

General information
- Location: Hjule-Johns gata 6
- Coordinates: 57°52′19″N 11°58′05″E
- Elevation: 9 m (30 ft)
- Manager: Västtrafik
- Bus stands: 15
- Bus operators: Västtrafik

Construction
- Platform levels: 2
- Cycle facilities: Multiple bicycle parking lots, both in and near the station

Other information
- Fare zone: A and B

History
- Opened: 29 April 2018
Location

Kungälv resecentrum is Kungälv's primary bus station, operated by Västtrafik. It serves as the city's main public transit link. The station is located just next to the E6 highway, connecting Kungälv to many other cities.

The station underwent a major reconstruction at a cost of 50 million Swedish kronor. Construction started in 2016 and went on for about two years with opening ceremony on April 29, 2018. The 800 m^{2} station has a two-floor waiting hall, free Wi-Fi, and coffee shops.
