= Varberg railway station =

Railway station in Varberg, Sweden

Varberg old station

General information
- Location: Halland County; Sweden
- Coordinates: 57°6′34″N 12°14′55″E
- Elevation: 3 metres (9.8 ft)
- Lines: previously West Coast Line; Viskadal Line
- Tracks: 4

Construction
- Accessible: Yes
- Architect: Sven Fredrik Mellin

Other information
- Station code: Vb

History
- Opened: 1880
- Closed: 2025
Location

Varberg C

General information
- Location: Halland County; Sweden
- Coordinates: 57°6′40″N 12°14′58″E
- Elevation: −6 metres (−20 ft)
- Owner: Jernhusen
- Lines: West Coast Line; Viskadal Line
- Tracks: 5

Construction
- Accessible: Yes

Other information
- Station code: Vbc

History
- Opened: 2025

Services
Preceding station	SJ	Following station
Göteborg C Terminus	West Coast Line	Halmstad C towards Malmö C
Preceding station	Regional trains	Following station
Göteborg C towards Oslo S	RE20	Halmstad C towards Malmö C
Preceding station	Øresundståg	Following station
Åsa towards Gothenburg Central	Copenhagen–Gothenburg Øresundståg	Falkenberg towards Østerport
Preceding station	Västtågen	Following station
Tofta towards Uddevalla	Uddevalla-Borås-Varberg Line	Terminus
Åsa towards Göteborg C	Gothenburg-Varberg Line	Terminus
Location

Varberg railway station (Swedish: Varbergs station) is located in Varberg, Sweden, at the West Coast Line and the endpoint of the Viskadal Line. The station is located around 300 metres (980 ft) from the traditional midpoint of the city. Regional and city buses stop nearby.

== Trains ==
Fast trains and the regional express "Öresundståg" along the coast stop here. Regional trains also go towards Borås and further north.

== History ==
Railway traffic started in Varberg in 1880 when the Varberg–Borås Line, now called Viskadal Line was opened. In 1886 the Middle Halland Railway between Varberg and Halmstad opened. In 1888 the Gothenburg–Halland Järnväg between Gothenburg and Varberg opened. The two latter lines are now part of the West Coast Line.

A basically new high-speed railway has been built along the coast after 1980, for the part just north of Varberg finished in 1998. The part through and just south of Varberg was completed in 2025.

The old station building is from year 1880, but since 2025 no longer at the railway. In 2019 a tunnel began construction through Varberg, along with a new station at the northern end of the tunnel, close to the old station. This new station and the tunnel was opened for traffic in 2025.

In 2025, the International Union of Railways awarded the new Varberg station its annual award for "Station & Urban Design".
