= Gamlestaden, Gothenburg =

Urban district of Gothenburg, Sweden

Coordinates: 57°42′2″N 11°57′12″E

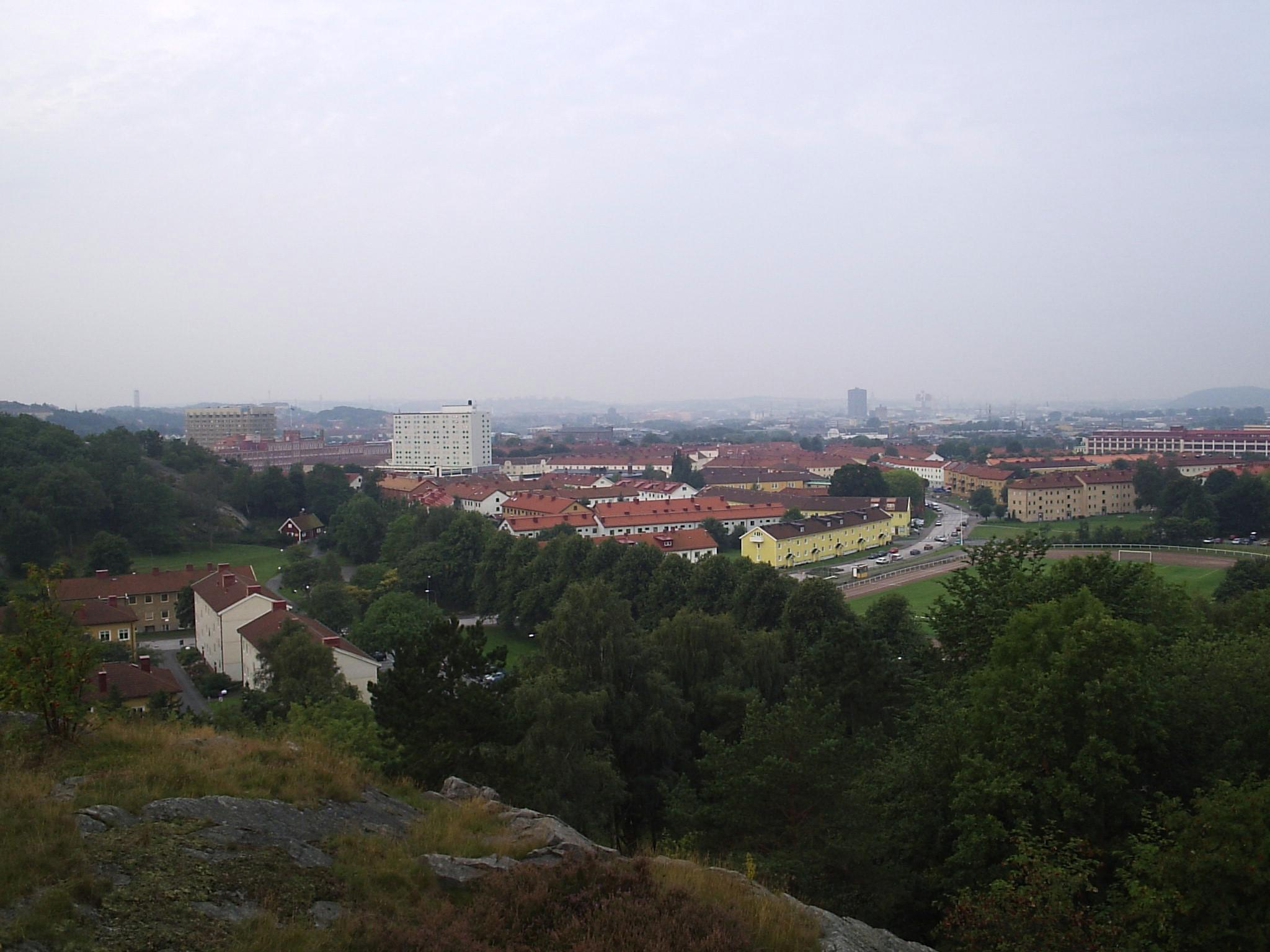
Gamlestaden.

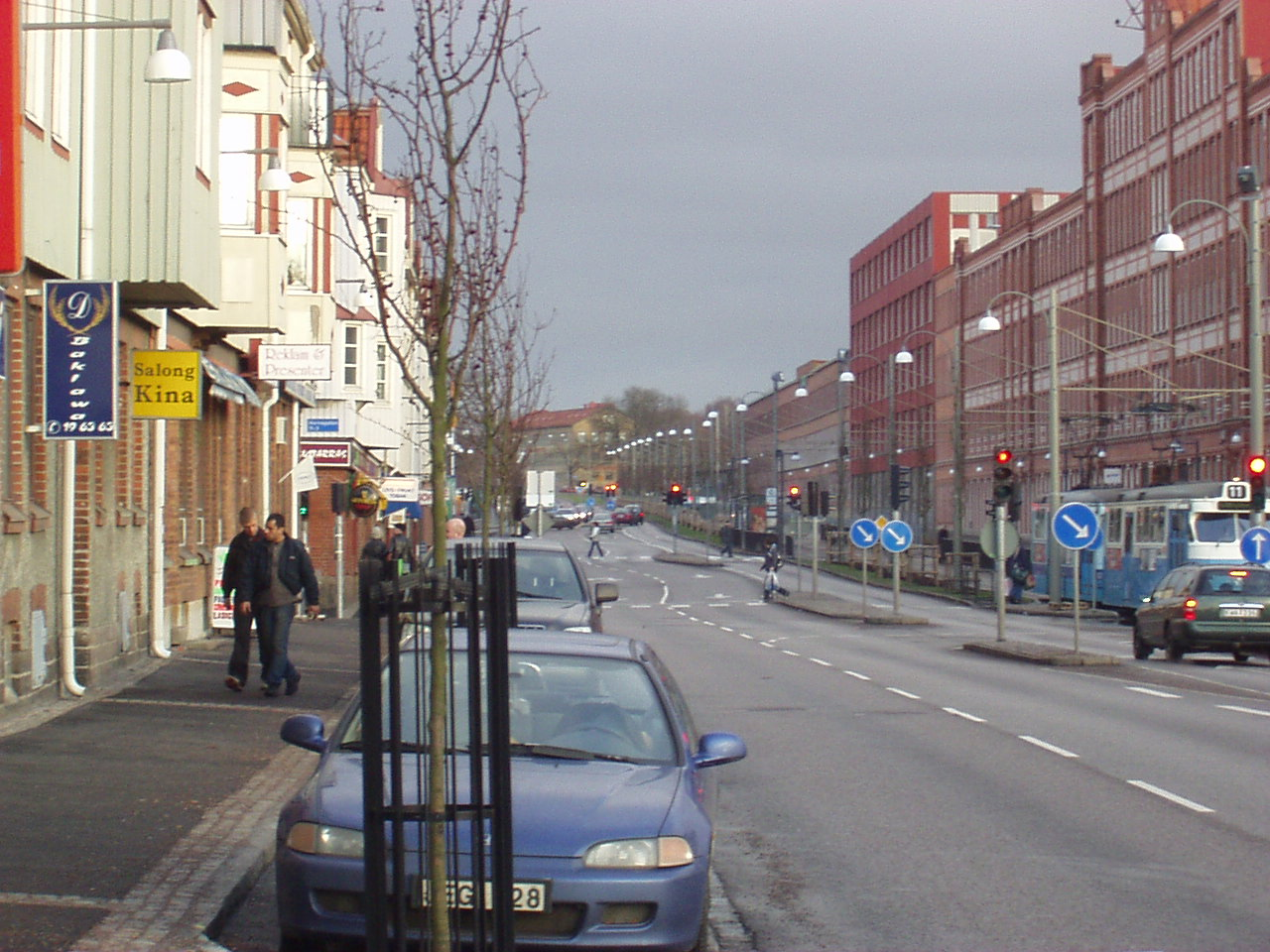
Artillerigatan. SKF is the building to the right

Gamlestaden is an urban district (Swedish: stadsdel) of Gothenburg, Sweden. The district has 7273 inhabitants (2009). In and around Gamlestaden there are some industries. Most well-known is SKF. The district has a commuter rail station by the same name.

== Gallery ==
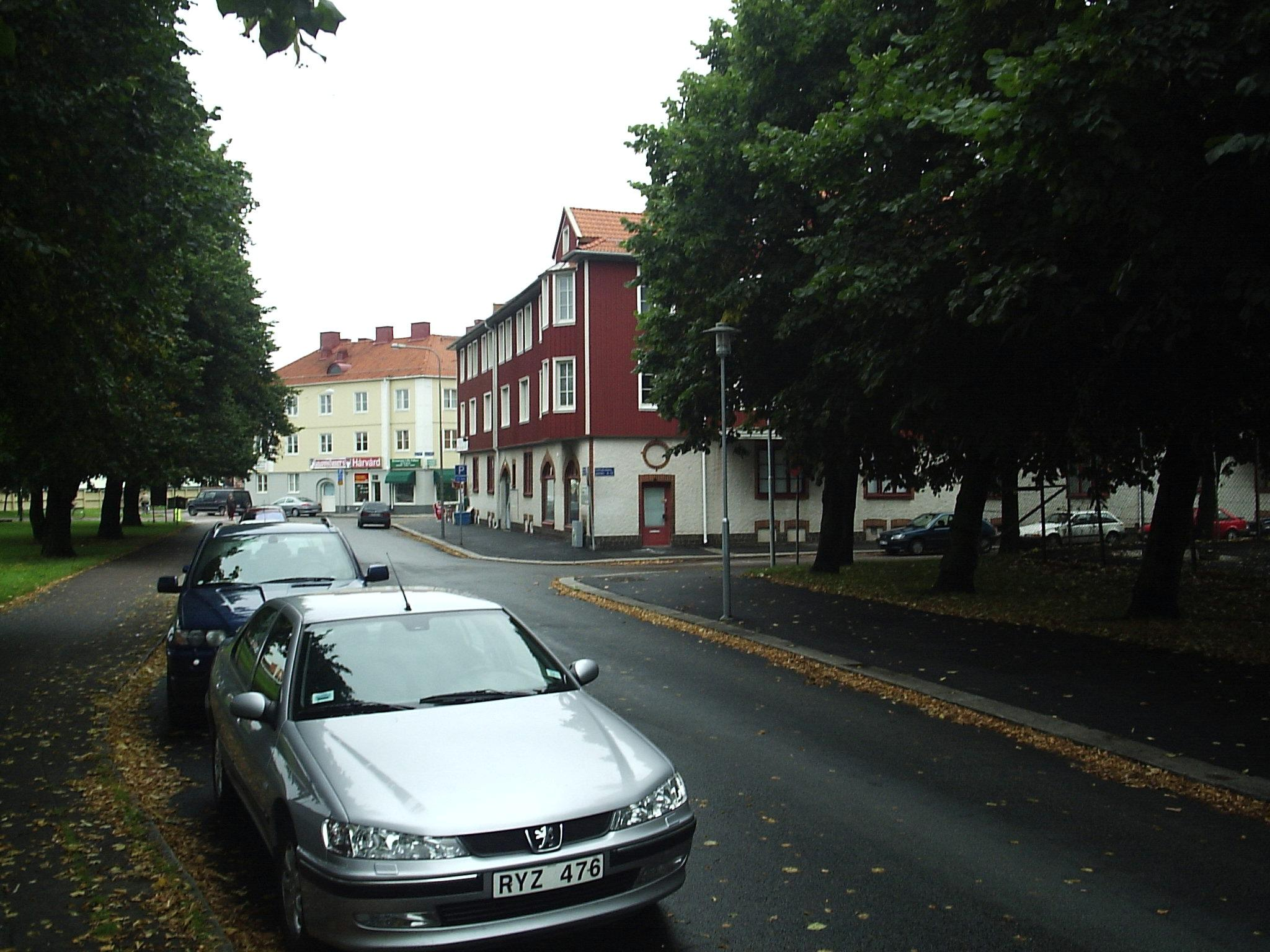
Street in Gamlestaden

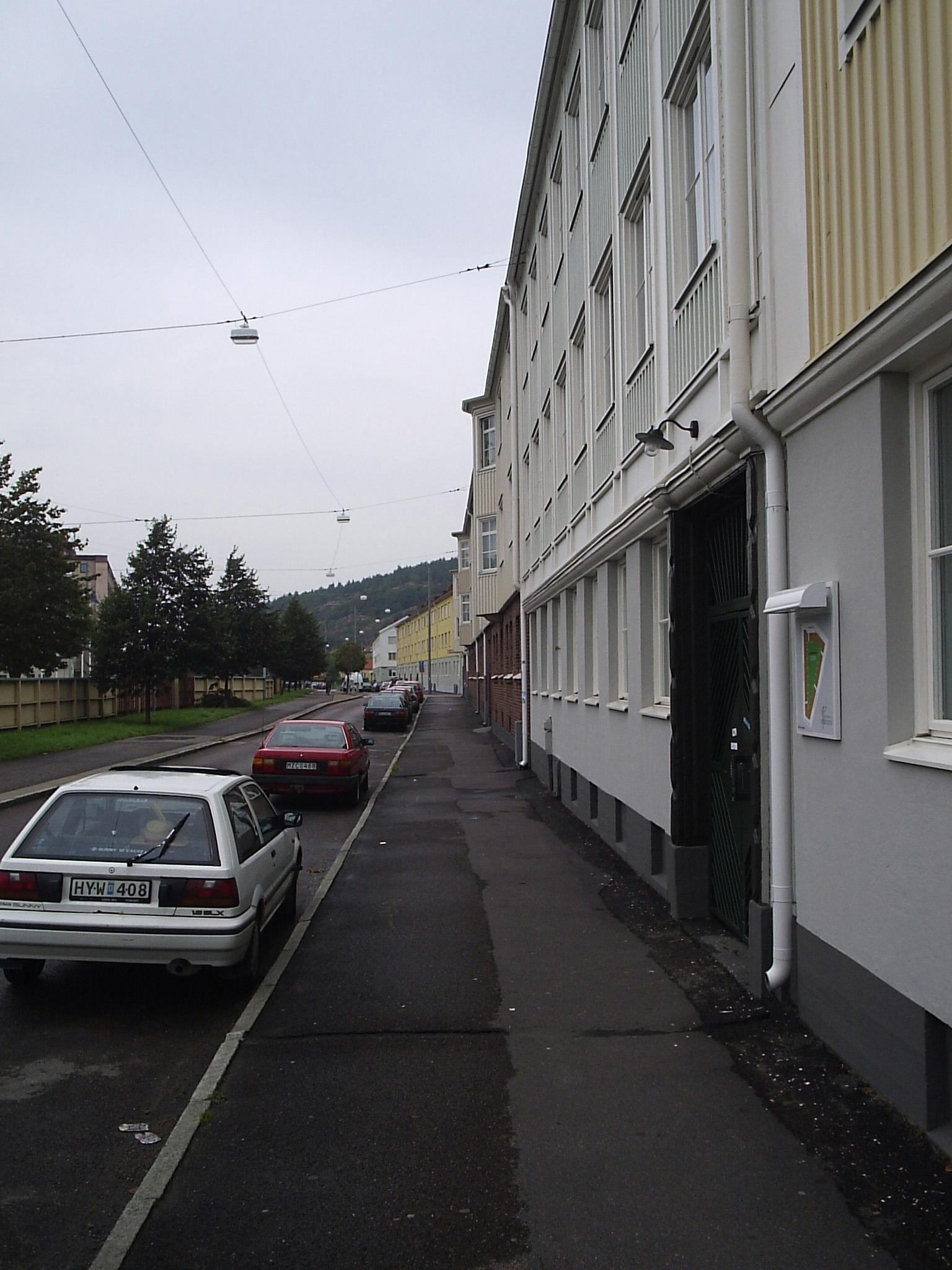
Street in Gamlestaden

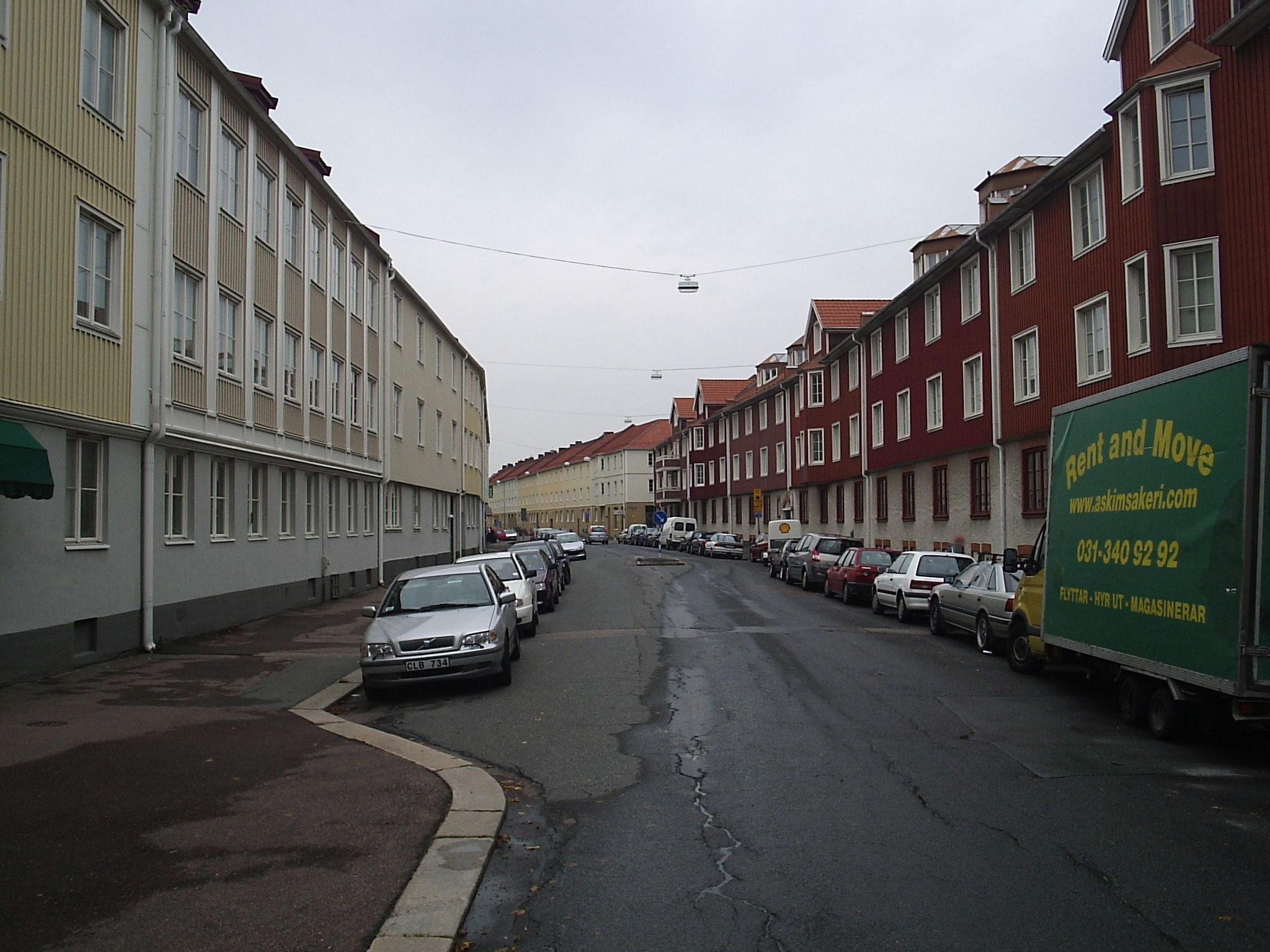
Street in Gamlestaden

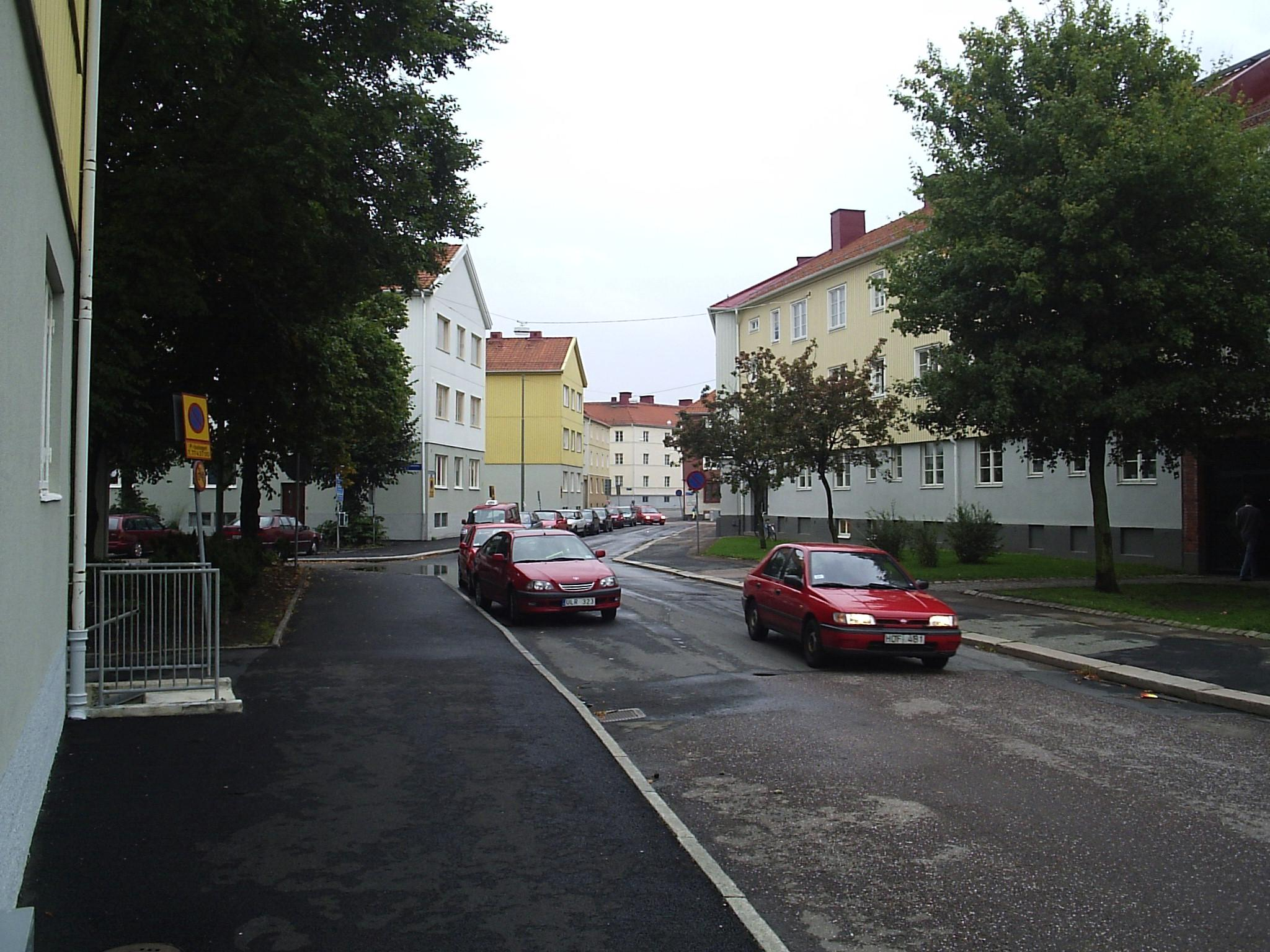
Street in Gamlestaden

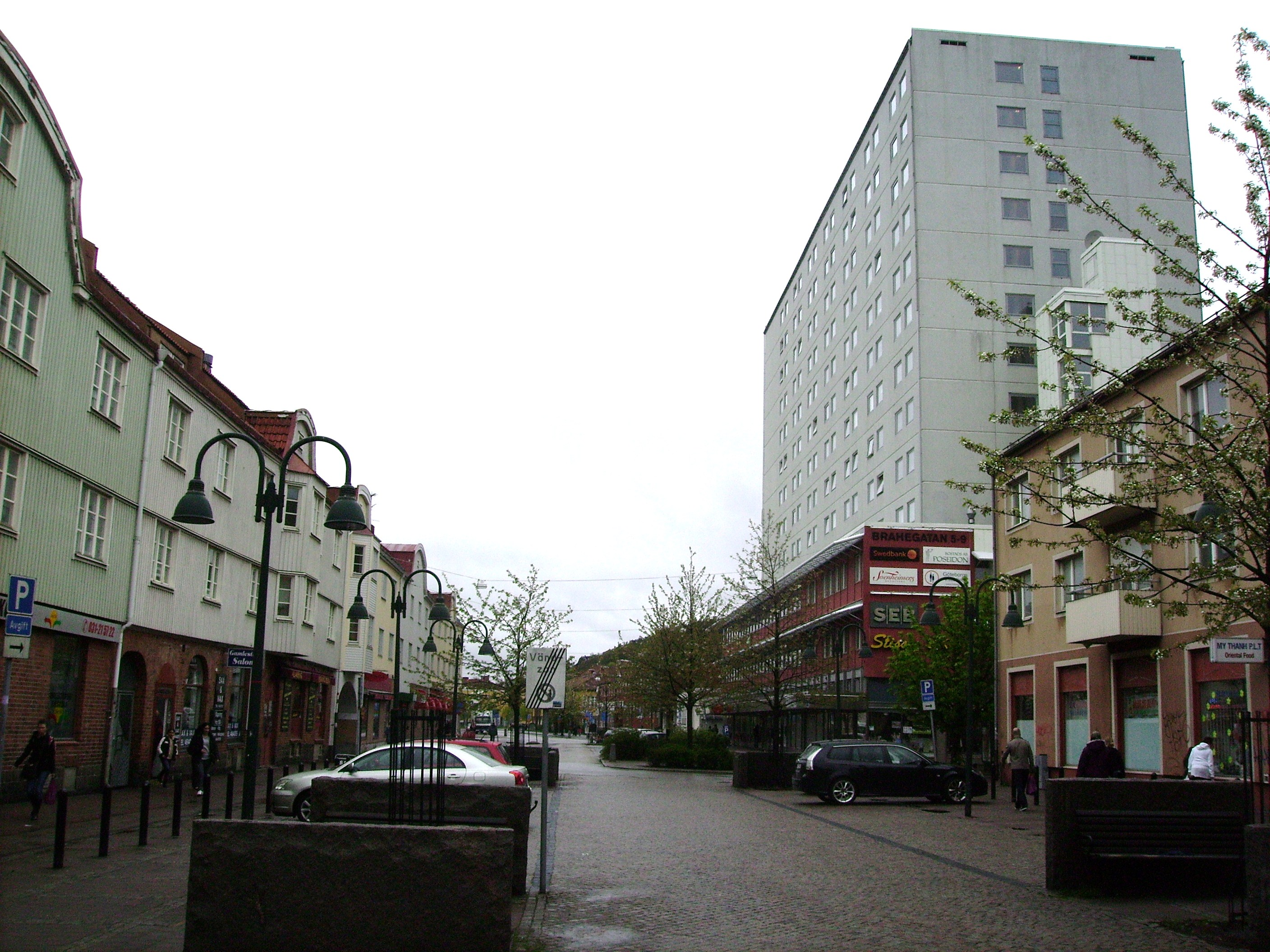
Street in Gamlestaden
