= Dala Line =

Railway line in Sweden

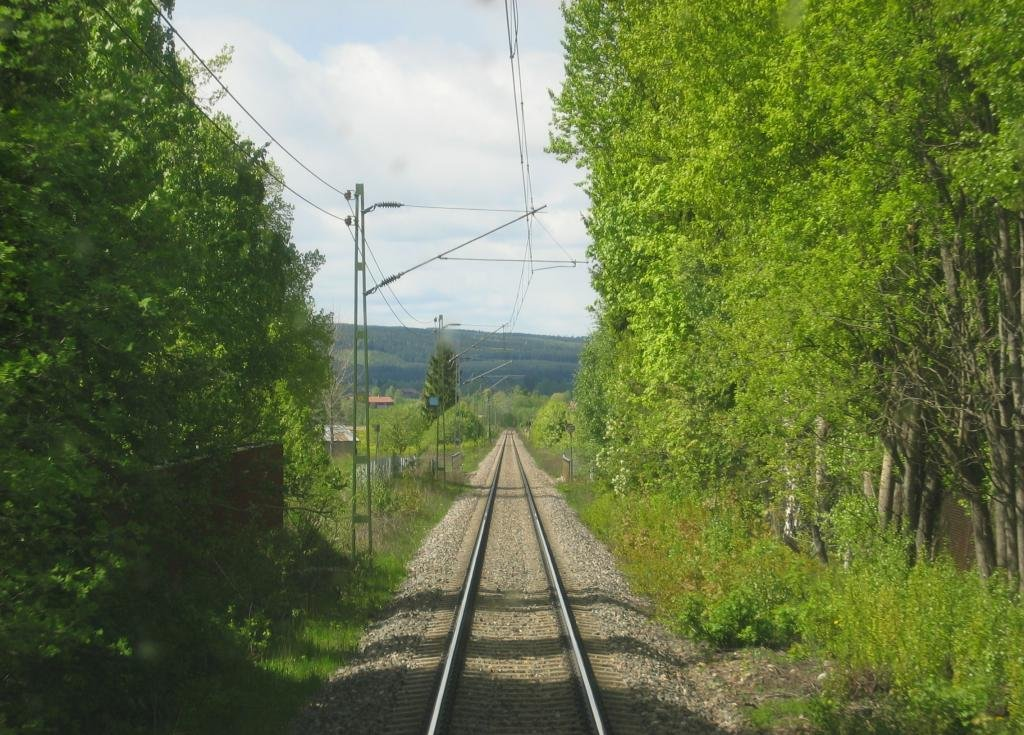
- The Dala Line between the Avesta Krylbo station and Borlänge.

Overview
- Native name: Dalabanan
- Status: Operating
- Termini: Uppsala; Mora

Technical
- Track length: 265 km (165 mi)
- Track gauge: 1,435 mm (4 ft 8 1/2 in) standard gauge
- Electrification: 15 kV 16 2/3 Hz

The Dala Line (Swedish: Dalabanan) is a 265 kilometres (165 mi) single-track railway line in Sweden, linking the city of Uppsala to the town of Mora, via Sala, Avesta-Krylbo, Hedemora, Säter, Borlänge and Leksand. In Uppsala, the line joins the East Coast Line, which goes south to Stockholm. In Borlänge, the Bergslagen Line connects to Falun–Gävle.

== History ==
In 2016, it was reported that the tracks were in poor condition and would need to be replaced. The work was underway by 2020, and the construction was visited by Tomas Eneroth, then the Minister for Traffic and Infrastructure.

In February 2025, it was announced that the Dala Line would be upgraded with funds from the Swedish Transport Agency.
