= Erikstad =

Village in Mellerud Municipality, Sweden

Coordinates: 58.632°N 12.410°E

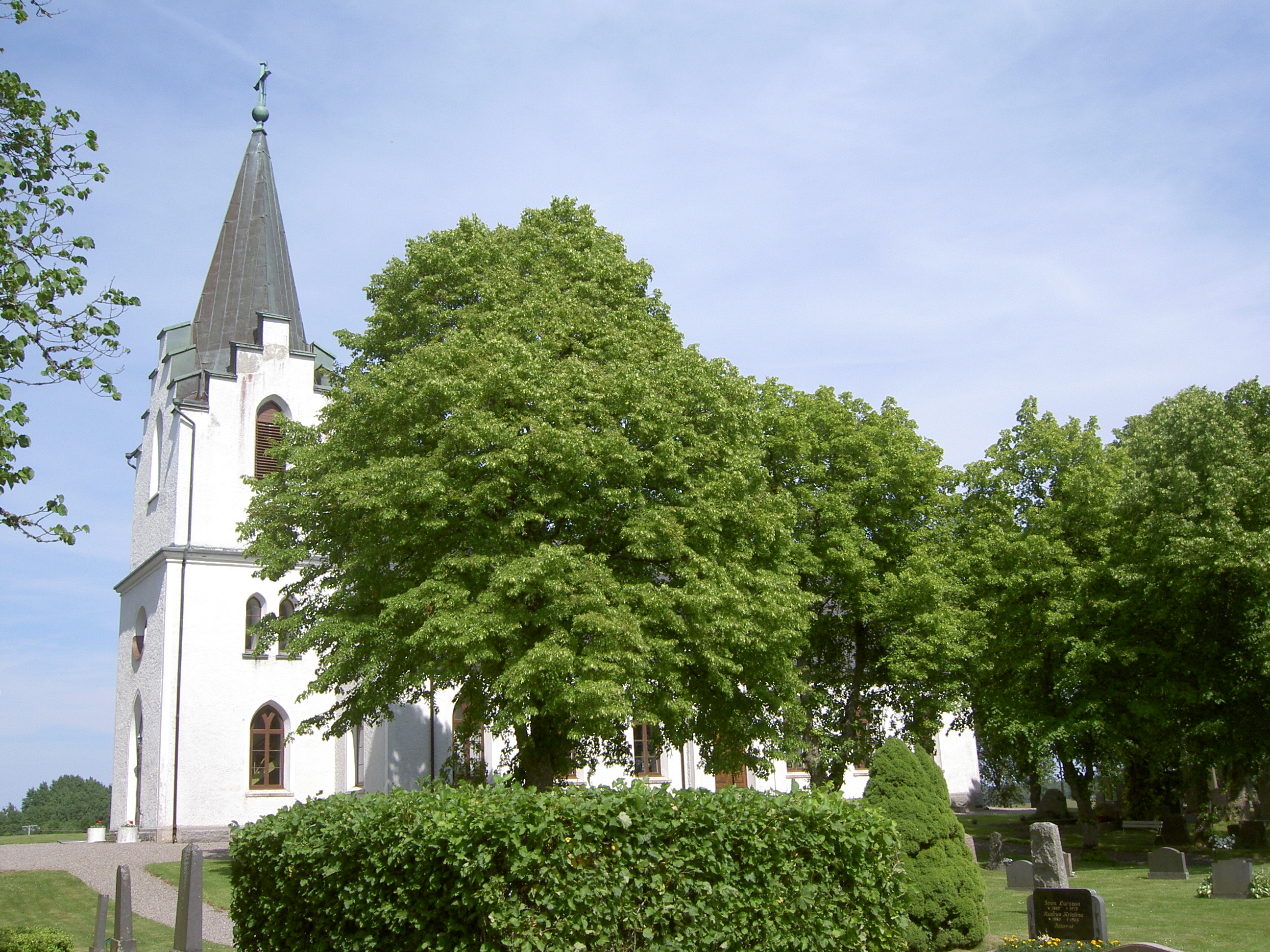
Erikstad Church

Erikstad is a small village in the Mellerud Municipality in Västra Götaland County in Sweden. As of 2015 it had a population of 68 people. It is located at the E45 road and the Norway/Vänern Line railway. The Erikstad church was built in 1881, and there is an abandoned church dated to 1686 nearby.
