= Grand Hotel, Halmstad =

Coordinates: 56.6699°N 12.8636°E

Grand Hotel Halmstad
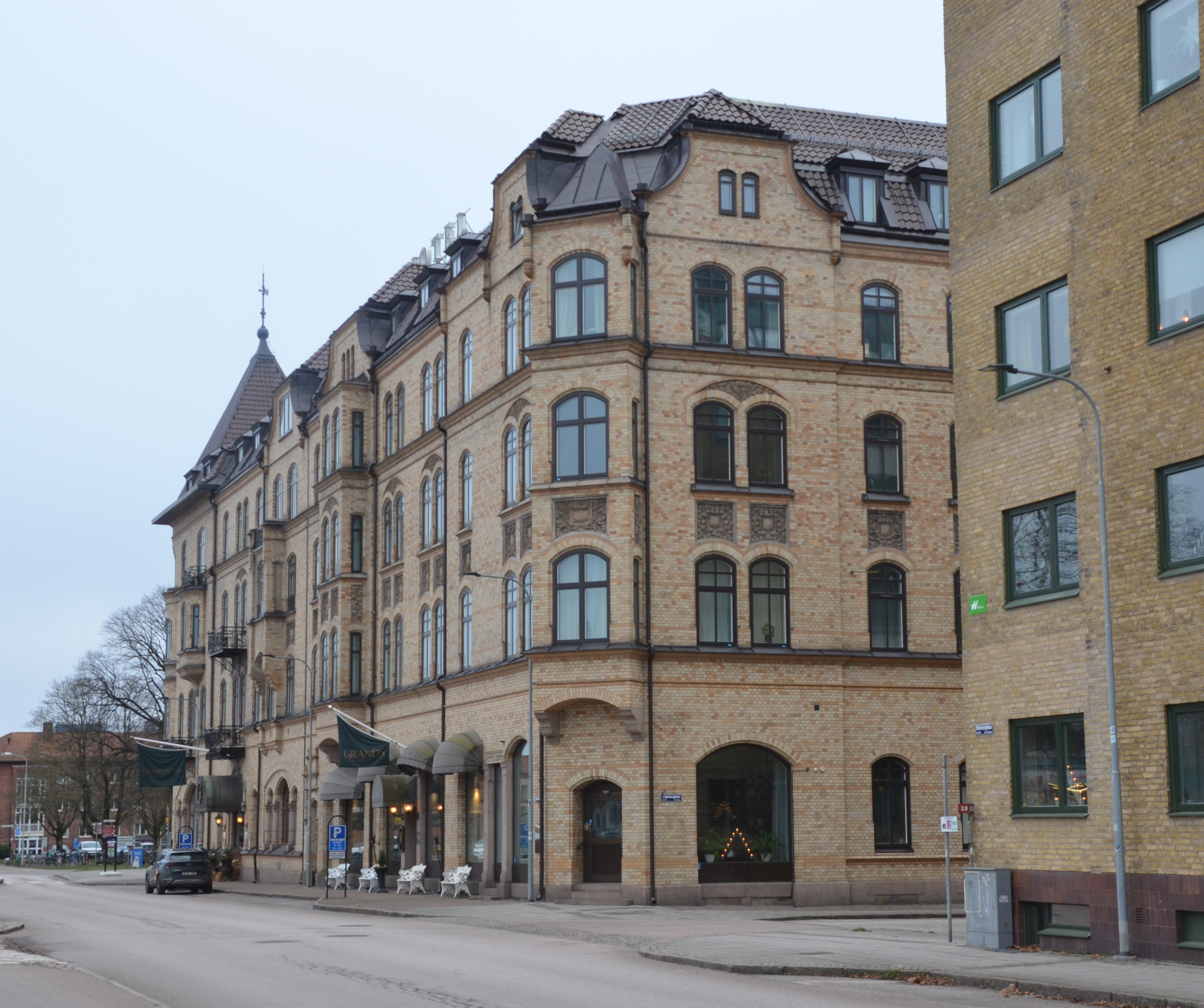
- Grand Hotel in Halmstad
- Interactive map of the Grand Hotel Halmstad area

General information
- Location: Stationsgatan 44; SE 302 45, Halmstad, Sweden
- Completed: 1905
- Client: August Winberg

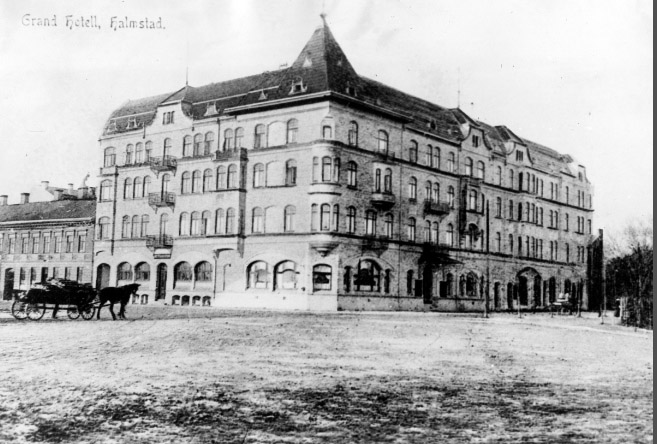
Old image of Grand Hotel Halmstad, year unknown

Grand Hotel Halmstad, also known as Best Western Plus Grand Hotel, is a 4-star hotel in central Halmstad, Sweden. It is located on the other side of the street to Halmstad Central Station.

== History ==
It was Halmstad's most luxurious building, during inauguration in 1905. Later, high construction costs and high debt resulted in bankruptcy in 1908, which led to Handelsbanken acquiring the building.

As of late 2023, the hotel was owned by Hospitum Fastigheter and operated by Room Republic. It underwent a major renovation in 2024.
