= Fryksdal Line =

Railway line in Sweden

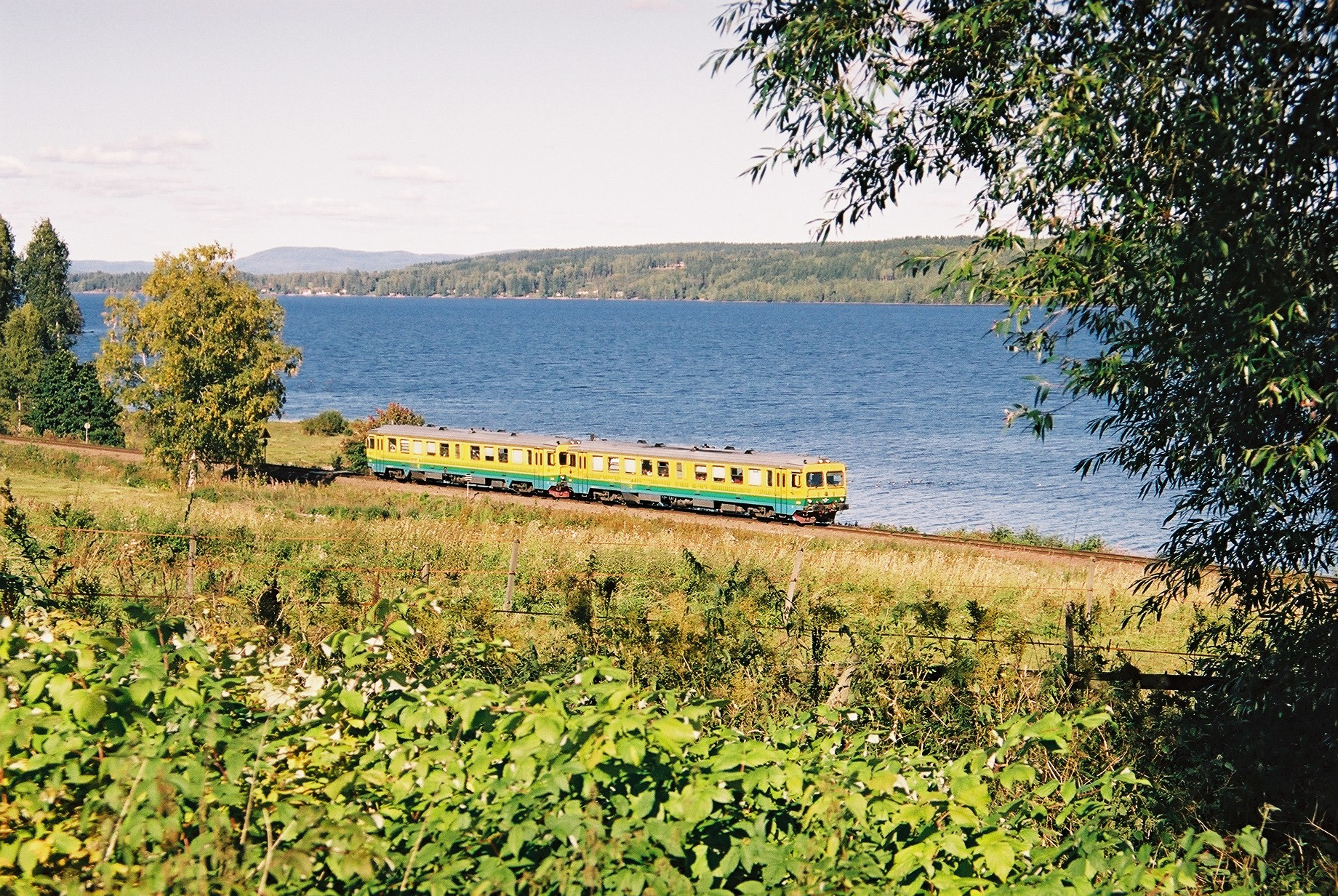
- An Y1 railcar, previously used on the line

Overview
- Native name: Fryksdalsbanan
- Termini: Kil; Torsby

History
- Opened: 1915

Technical
- Line length: 82 km (51 mi)
- Track gauge: 1,435 mm (4 ft 8 1/2 in) standard gauge
- Electrification: Not electrified

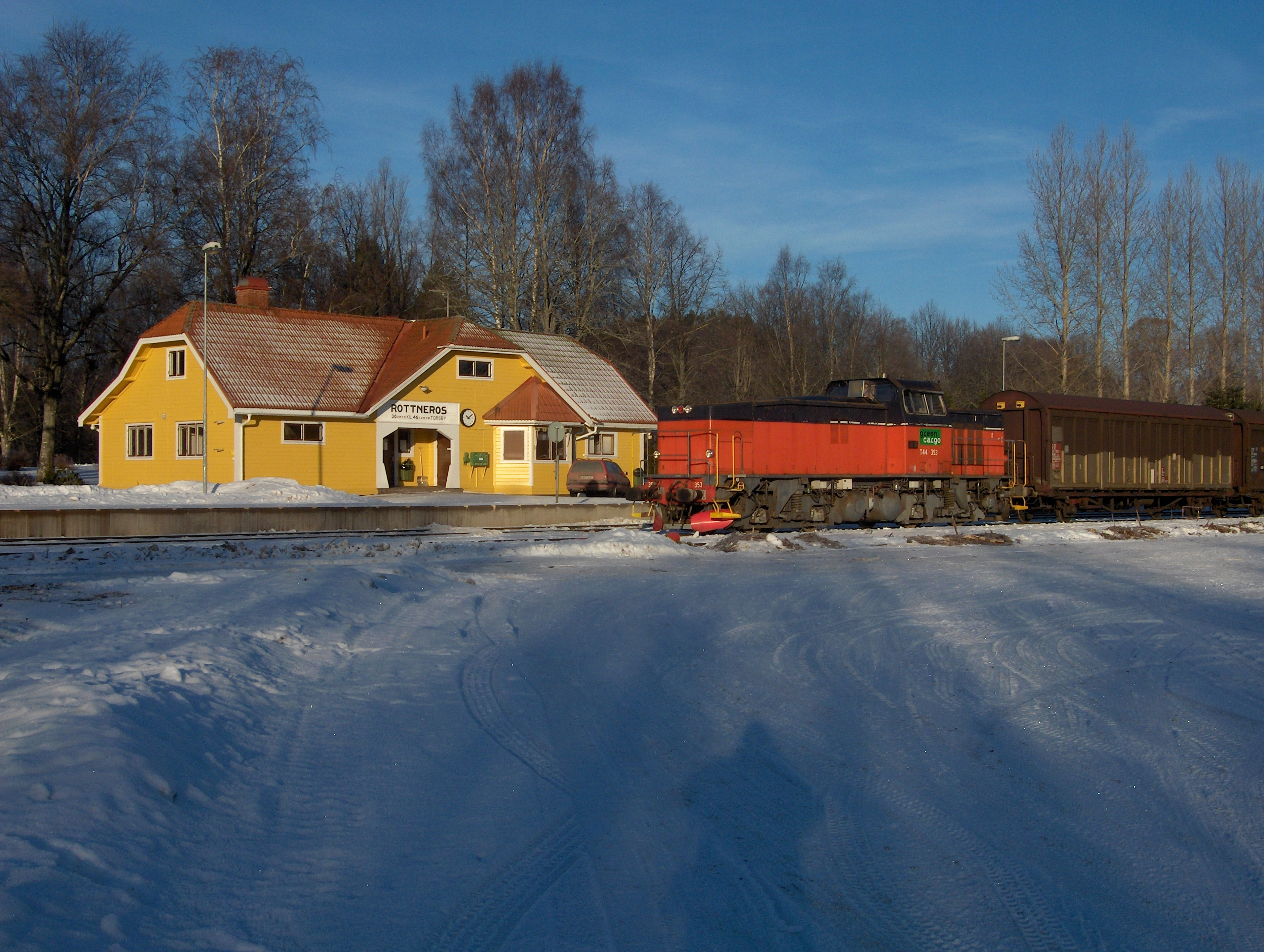

The Fryksdal Line (Swedish: Fryksdalsbanan) is an 82-kilometre (51 mi) long railway line between Kil, Värmland and Torsby, Värmland in Sweden. The line is single track, and is not electric. Passenger services are provided by Värmlandstrafik using class Y31 DMUs. The line is also used by freight trains hauling mostly wood, pulpwood and paper.
