= Halmstad-Nässjö railway line =

Railway line in Sweden

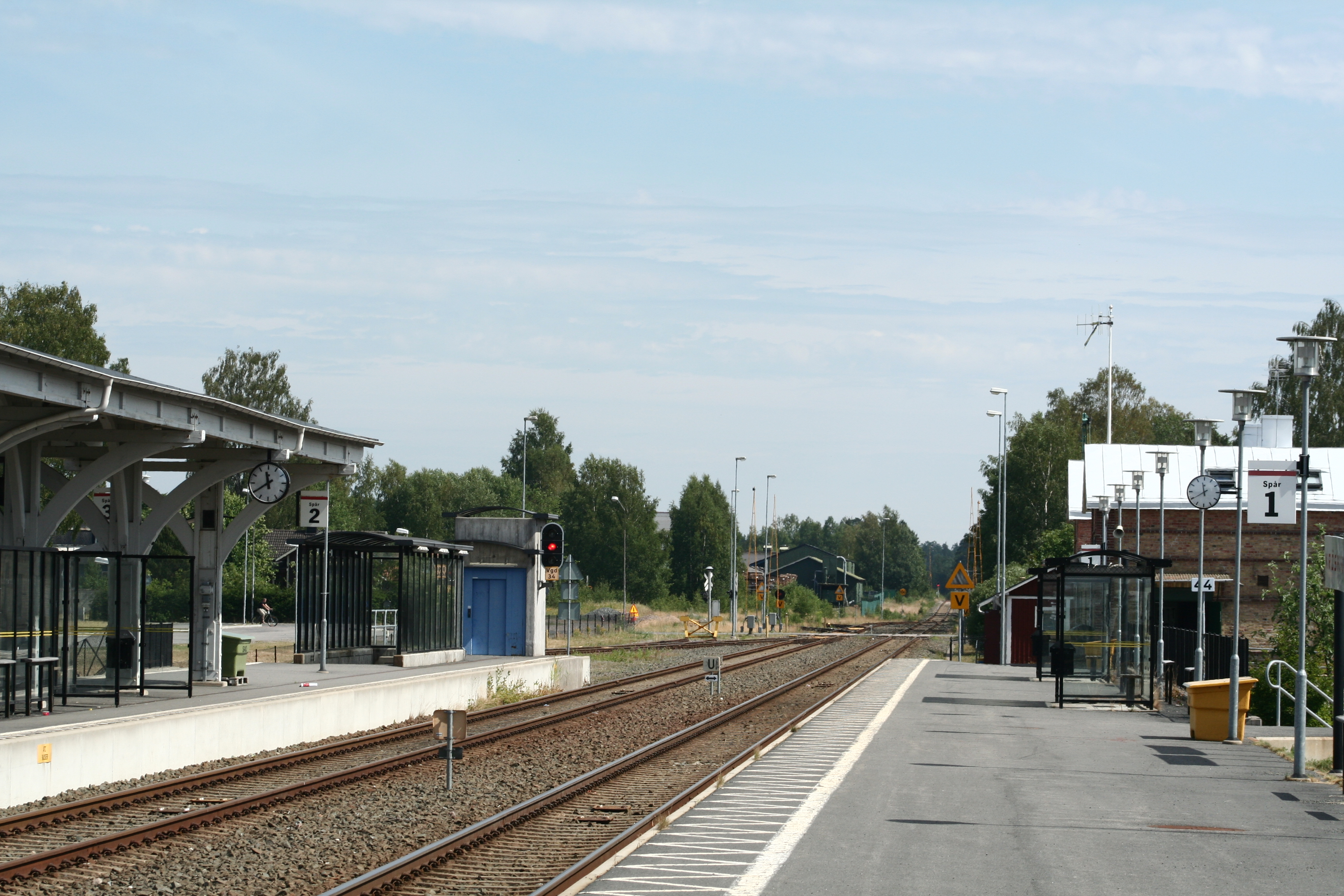
- Vaggeryd station

Overview
- Native name: Järnvägslinjen Halmstad–Nässjö
- Owner: Swedish Transport Administration
- Termini: Halmstad; Nässjö

Service
- System: Krösatågen

History
- Opened: 1 September 1877
- Completed: 21 December 1882

Technical
- Line length: 196 km (122 mi)
- Track gauge: 1,435 mm (4 ft 8 1/2 in) standard gauge

The Halmstad-Nässjö railway line (Swedish: Järnvägslinjen Halmstad–Nässjö) is a Swedish railway line between Halmstad and Nässjö. The railway is unelectrified in its entirety and only has a single track.

The track was originally built by the private consortium Halmstad-Jönköpings Järnvägsaktiebolag, but the company went bankrupt only three years after construction finished in 1882. The company was reconstructed as Halmstad-Nässjö Järnvägar (HNJ), which owned and operated the railway until the railway line was nationalised in 1945.

Today passenger services are operated on the railway by the public operator Krösatågen. In the coming years the railway will be electrified between Nässjö and Värnamo. A report commissioned by the local government in Halland County completed in 2021 has proposed a closure of services from Halmstad to Jönköping and Värnamo which use the line today, alongside starting rail services to Hyltebruk, which currently only sees freight traffic.
