= Norway/Vänern Line =

Railway line in Sweden

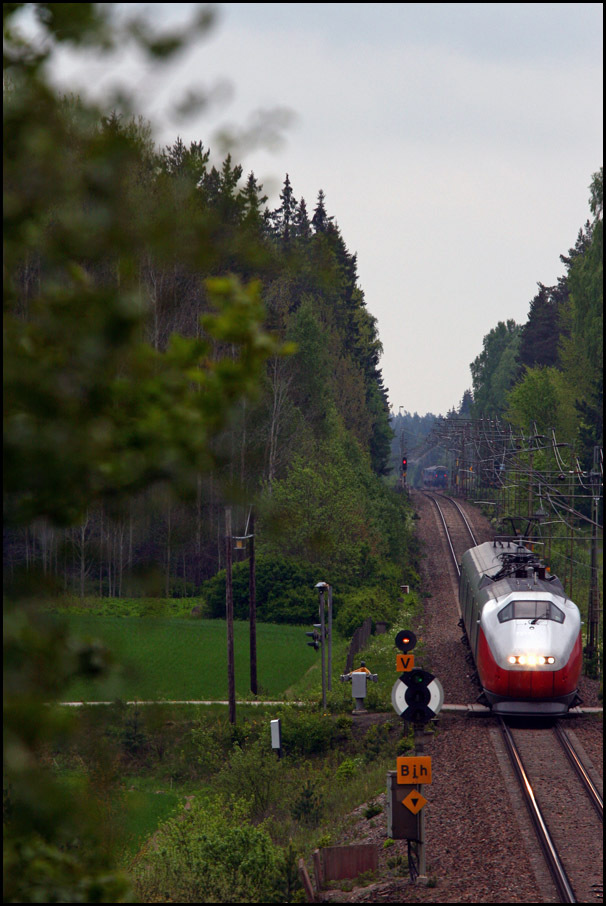
- NSB Class 73 north of Öxnered

Overview
- Locale: Sweden

Technical
- Line length: 300 km (190 mi)
- Number of tracks: 1; 2 (Gothenburg–Öxnered)
- Track gauge: 1,435 mm (4 ft 8 1/2 in) standard gauge
- Electrification: 15 kV 16.7 Hz AC
- Operating speed: 200 km/h (125 mph)

Norway/Vänern Line (Swedish: Norge/Vänerbanan) is a Y-shaped railway line in Sweden. The main section runs from Gothenburg Central Station to Kil Station, mostly along the west shore of Vänern. There is a branch from Erikstad to the Norway–Sweden border at Kornsjø, from which it continues as the Østfold Line to Oslo.

The lengths of the line are 112 kilometres (70 mi) from Gothenburg to Erikstad, 180 kilometres (110 mi) from Gothenburg to Kornsjø and 232 kilometres (144 mi) from Gothenburg to Kil. The line is single track, except for the 82 kilometres (51 mi) section from Gothenburg to Öxnered, which is double track.

== History ==
The railways were finished in 1879. A shortcut at Erikstad was built for the Norway branch in 1995. The section from Gothenburg to Öxnered was rebuilt as a new double-track railway in the period 2005–2012. The current name was introduced in 1990. From the construction until then, the name was Bergslagen Line, between Gothenburg, through Kil, to Falun, later Gävle. The line to Norway then started at Mellerud and was called Dalsland Line.

== Traffic ==
As of 2018, the following passenger rail services exist on the line:

- SJ operates the route Karlstad–Gothenburg once every two hours, joining the Norway/Vänern Line in Kil. The trains used are Regina EMUs of the type X52E. SJ also operates a twice-daily Halden–Gothenburg service.
- TÅGAB operates locomotive-hauled trains on Kil–Gothenburg as part of its longer routes Falun–Karlstad–Gothenburg (twice per day) and Stockholm–Karlstad–Gothenburg (once per day).
- Vy (formerly the Norwegian State Railways) operates the route Oslo–Halden–Gothenburg, using the Norway/Vänern Line between Kornsjø and Gothenburg, three times per day with Stadler FLIRT multiple units. The trains run as normal regional trains inside Norway with several stops.
- An hourly (twice-hourly in rush hours) Västtågen regional train service exists on the route Vänersborg–Öxnered–Trollhättan–Gothenburg, with a complementing Säffle–Gothenburg rush-hour service. Operation is contracted by Västtrafik to SJ Götalandståg.
- The Gothenburg commuter rail operates twice-hourly (every 15 minutes in rush hours) between Älvängen and Gothenburg. Operation is, as with Västtågen, contracted by Västtrafik to SJ Götalandståg.

In addition, freight trains operate on the entire railway – from Gothenburg to Falun and to places in northern Sweden via Kil, and between Gothenburg and Norway via Kornsjø.
