= Gothenburg Central Station =

Railway station in Gothenburg, Sweden

Gothenburg Central Station Göteborgs Centralstation
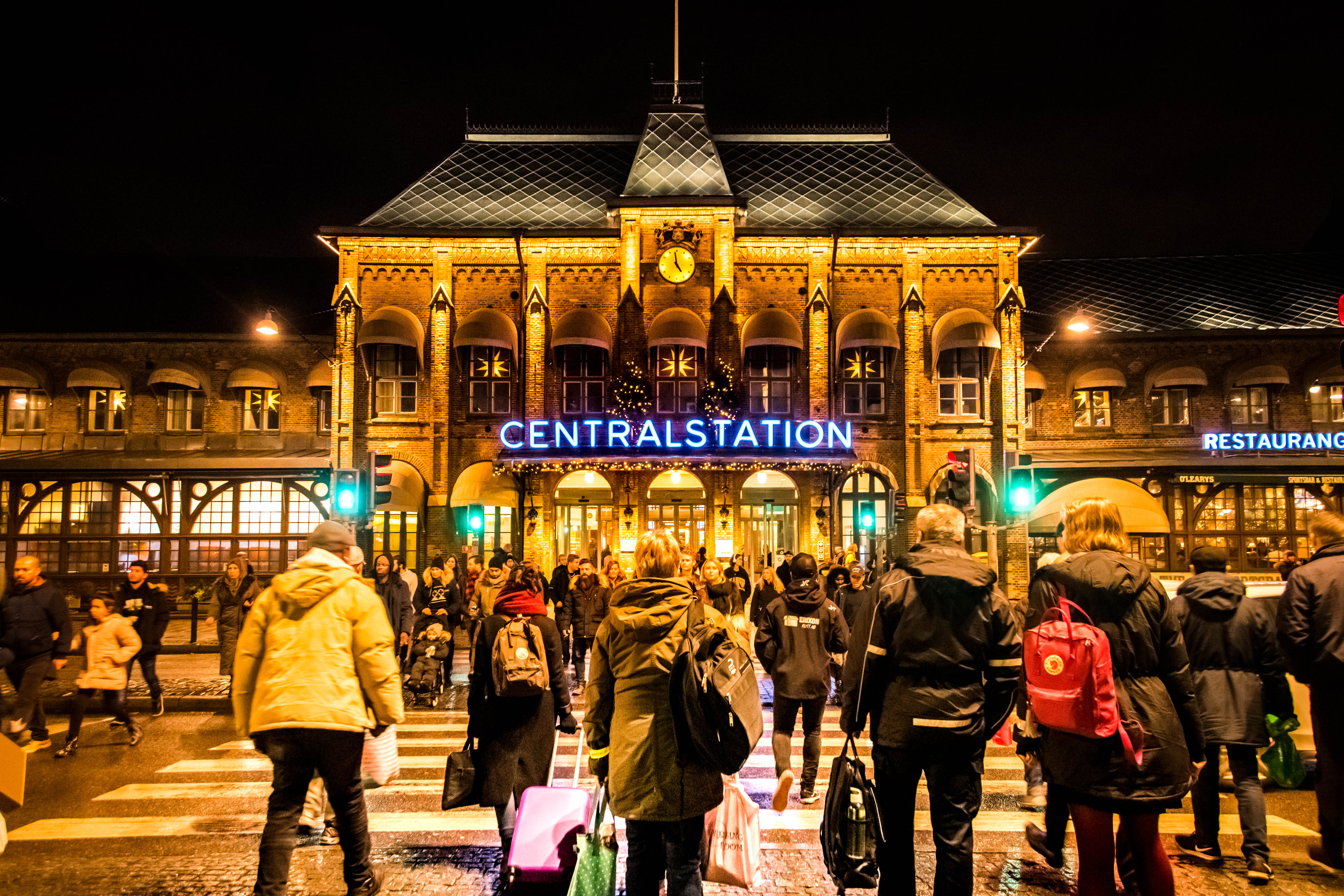
- Gothenburg Central Station at night, during Christmas period

General information
- Location: Drottningtorget 5; 411 03 Gothenburg; Sweden
- Coordinates: 57°42′32″N 11°58′24″E
- Elevation: 3 m (9.8 ft)
- Owner: Jernhusen (station infrastructure); Trafikverket (rail infrastructure)
- Operator: SJ
- Lines: Gothenburg-Stockholm; Gothenburg-Strömstad; Gothenburg-Kil; Lund-Gothenburg; Gothenburg-Kalmar
- Platforms: 8
- Tracks: 16

History
- Opened: 4 October 1858; 167 years ago

Services
Preceding station	SJ	Following station
Alingsås towards Stockholm C via Örebro C	Mälaren Line and Western Main Line	Terminus
Herrljunga C towards Stockholm C	Western Main Line	Terminus
Trollhättan towards Karlstad C	Vänern Line	Terminus
Borås towards Kalmar	Coast-to-Coast Line	Terminus
Varberg C towards Malmö C	West Coast Line	Terminus
Preceding station	Øresundståg	Following station
Mölndal towards Østerport	Copenhagen–Gothenburg Øresundståg	Terminus
Preceding station	Regional trains	Following station
Trollhättan towards Oslo S	RE20	Terminus
Preceding station	Long distance trains	Following station
Alingsås towards Stockholm C	VR	Terminus
Preceding station	Västtågen	Following station
Terminus	Gothenburg-Alingsås Line	Sävenäs towards Alingsås
Terminus	Gothenburg-Älvängen Line	Gamlestaden towards Älvängen
Terminus	Gothenburg-Kungsbacka Line	Liseberg towards Kungsbacka
Terminus	Gothenburg-Stenungsund Line	Ytterby towards Stenungsund
Terminus	Gothenburg-Strömstad Line	Gamlestaden towards Strömstad
Terminus	Gothenburg-Vänersborg Line	Gamlestaden towards Vänersborg
Terminus	Gothenburg-Lidköping-Mariestad-Örebro Line	Alingsås towards Örebro C
Terminus	Gothenburg-Skövde Line	Alingsås towards Skövde C
Terminus	Gothenburg-Nässjö Line	Alingsås towards Nässjö C
Terminus	Gothenburg-Borås Line	Mölnlycke towards Borås Central
Terminus	Gothenburg-Varberg Line	Mölndal towards Varberg C
Location

Gothenburg Central Station (Swedish: Göteborgs Centralstation, Göteborg C) is the main railway station of Gothenburg and it is the oldest railway station in Sweden still in use. The station serves 27 million passengers per year, making it the second largest railway station in Sweden after Stockholm Central Station which it predates by 13 years. The station opened on October 4, 1858. The station is situated in central Gothenburg, at Drottningtorget, and is connected to the Nils Ericson bus terminal. Gothenburg Central Station's buildings are owned and managed by Jernhusen.

== History ==
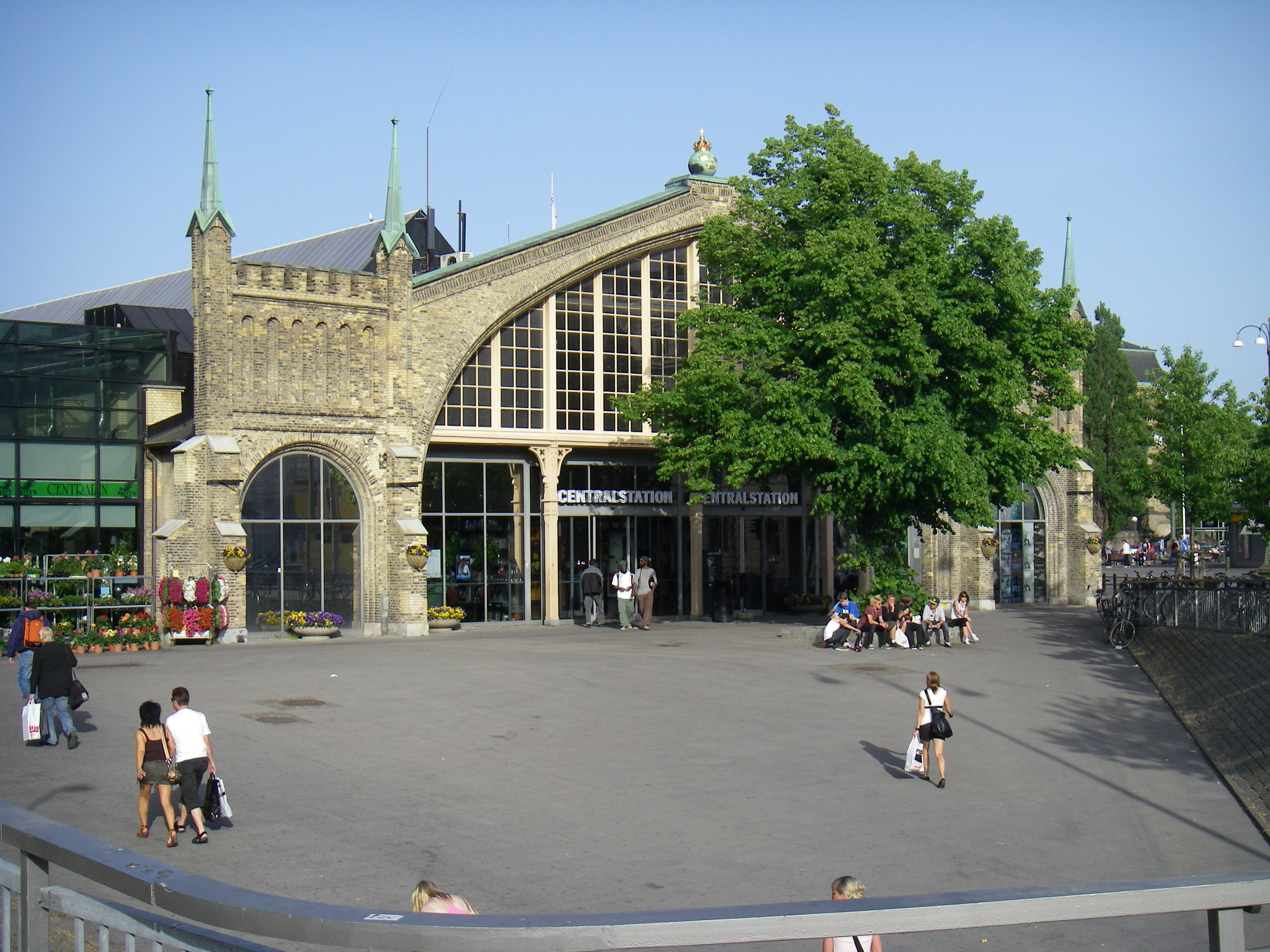
The western entrance

Official logo (2024)

Numerous railways were built across Sweden in the 19th century. One of the first distances was the one between Gothenburg and Jonsered. As the railway grew more popular, the need for a station emerged. The Gothenburg Central Station was built between 1856 and 1858. The first building was constructed between 1856 and 1857 by architect Adolf Wilhelm Edelsvärd on land which was previously occupied by a prison.

First, the building included a big entry hall, two waiting areas and a few restaurants.

In 1923 the train station was rebuilt and enlarged after Folke Zettervall's plans, who was the official SJ architect by that time. On March 14, 1923, fire destroyed large parts of the Central Station. Between 1928 and 1930 the station was enlarged due to the increased volume of traffic. After 1930 some more changes were made, including a new restaurant built in front of Drottningtorget. In 1993, the Central Station was restored and between 2000 and 2003 the Central House, was added as an extension to the existing building. The current interior design is similar to the 1923 model with wood pillars, glass ceiling and a floor made of limestone.

In the 1940s it was proposed to demolish the waiting hall, but the hall was preserved as it was decorated with paintings by artist Filip Månsson but the paintings could not be preserved and it was decided to keep the hall.

During the 19th and early 20th century about one million Swedish emigrants passed through the station to get to the harbour. Their final destination would be America.

In February 2007, a bomb threat was addressed to the Gothenburg police. The bombing was to take place at the Gothenburg Central Station. Later that day, a bag was found in the old parts of the station. The evacuation of the station began at 21:30 local time and two hours later the station was free to open again. The bag was examined and no high explosive was found.

In January 2010, a one square metre (11 Sq Ft) section of the station's glass ceiling collapsed after ice had fallen onto it. One person suffered bruises by falling glass splinters and big parts of the station were closed due to safety reasons.

=== Expansion ===
A new underground station facility for regional trains, Centralen station is under construction adjacent to Gothenburg Central and the Nils Ericson Terminal bus station. It is expected to open in 2026 as part of the West Link tunnel.

== Tracks and other connections ==
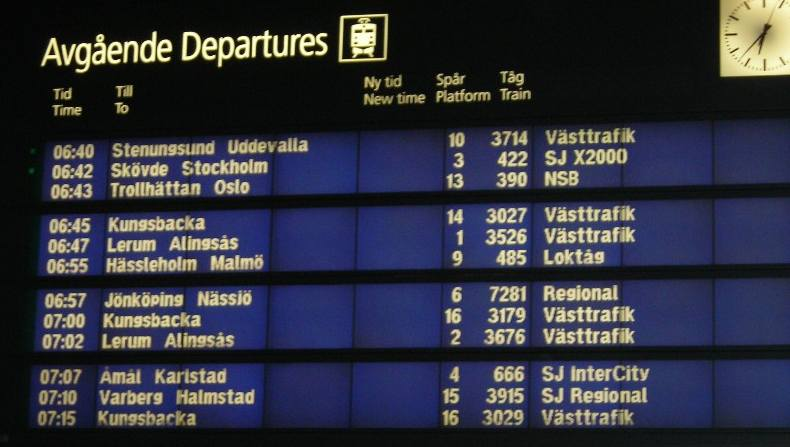
Departures in the morning

There are 16 platform tracks at the station. Trains depart and arrive from five different railway lines:

- To the north on the Bohus Line, towards Stenungsund, Uddevalla and Strömstad.
- To the north on the Norway/Vänern Line, towards Älvängen, Vänersborg, Karlstad and Oslo (Norway).
- To the east on the Western Main Line, towards Alingsås, Skövde, Stockholm and Luleå.
- To the south on the West Coast Line, towards Kungsbacka, Malmö and Copenhagen (Denmark).
- To the southeast on Coast-to-Coast Line, towards Borås and Kalmar.

The choice of track depends mainly on which railway the train will use. This is because there is a wish to avoid crossing train paths, which would create delays. Trains to the Bohus Line and Norway/Vänern Line generally use tracks 7–11. Trains to the Western Main Line generally use tracks 1–7. Trains to the West Coast Line and Coast-to-Coast Line generally use tracks 11–16.

Drottningtorget is a junction for trams and local buses and lies right by the Gothenburg Central Station. Nordstan also has a large tram and bus stop, and a shopping mall connected to the station by an underground pedestrian tunnel.

Just north of the Central Station with indoor connection is the Nils Ericson Terminal, the main bus terminal for regional and long-distance buses including the buses to the airport. Southeast of the Central Station there is another bus terminal, called Åkareplatsen, with regional buses to Borås.

== Lounge ==
The Station Lounge is located by track 9 at the station. There is an access fee of 149 SEK which includes restaurant food, newspapers and Internet access through a WLAN. There is also a bar. The conference section is supplied with modern equipment and admits 4–50 persons.

== Art pieces ==
High above the main waiting area, there are hand painted maps of the main railways out of Gothenburg, as they were around 1925 when they were painted.

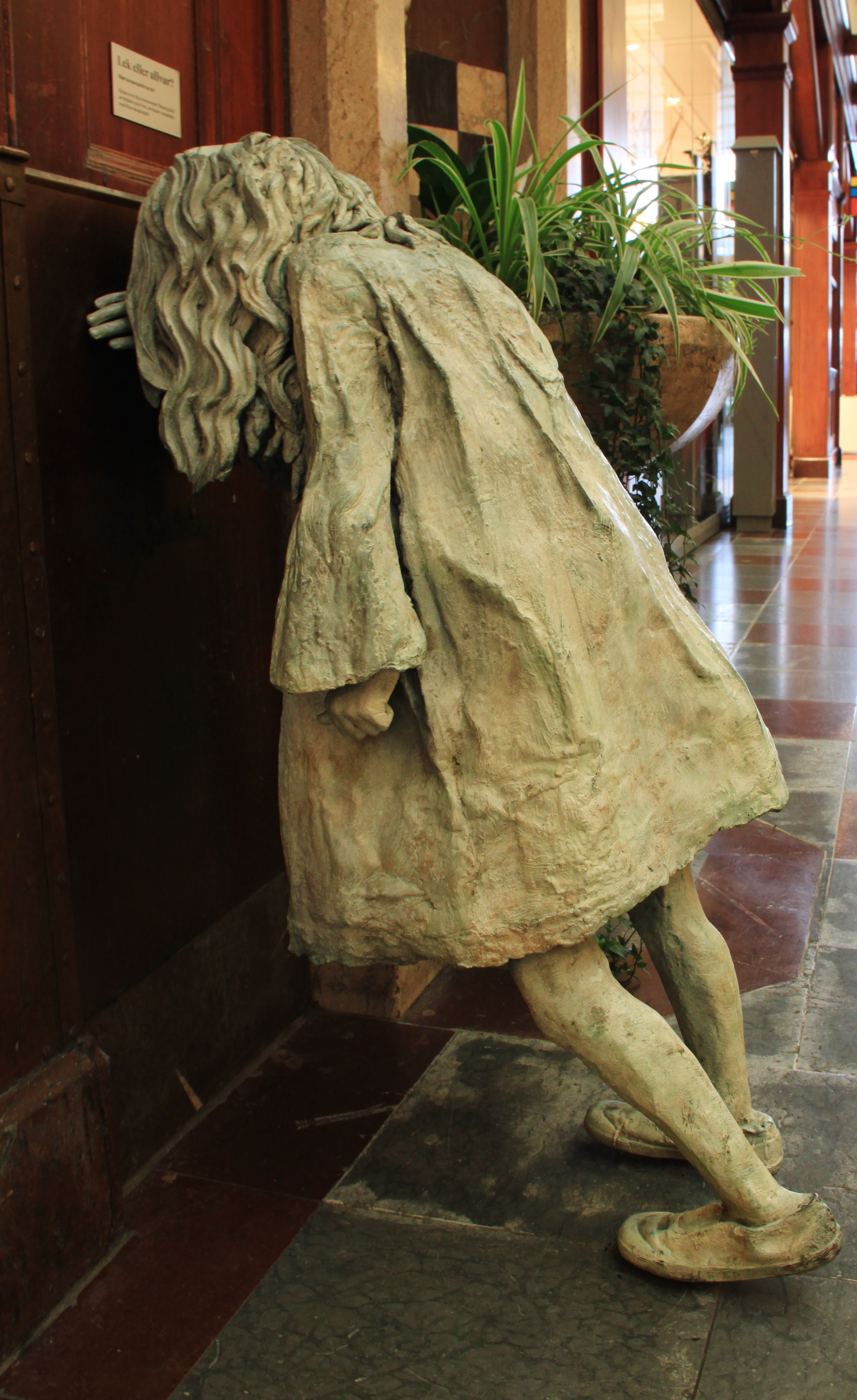
Weeping girl no. 5

Weeping Girl is a bronze sculpture in the station created by artist Laura Ford, born in Cardiff, Wales. It measures about 1 metre (3 ft) in height and was installed at the station in 2009.

== Facilities ==
There are several facilities in the station, among them shops, a bank office, cafes, restaurants, a pharmacy, a hotel and lounges.

== Maintenance ==
The old parts of the station are included in the city council's Bevarningsprogram (English: Preserving Program) 1975 and 1987.
