= Västtrafik =

West Sweden's public transport agency

Gothenburg Public Transport
- Native name: Västtrafik
- Type: Privat aktiebolag
- Founded: 1998
- Owner: Västra Götaland Regional Council
- Website: www.vasttrafik.se

Västtrafik is the agency responsible for public transport services involving buses, ferries, trains, and the Gothenburg tram network in the county of Västra Götaland, Sweden (plus Kungsbacka Municipality). It was established with the Västra Götaland County on 1 January 1998. Until 31 December 2011 the ownership was shared equally between the Västra Götaland Regional Council and the 49 municipalities in the region, from 1 January 2012 the county council is the sole owner. The fleet consists of approximately 1900 vehicles.

== Operation ==
Västtrafik is the brand name which is printed on tickets and vehicles. Västtrafik has the responsibility, but the actual operation of traffic, including employment of staff and ownership of vehicles is done by separate operators. An exception is that Västtrafik for practical reasons (such as long delivery times for new vehicles) owns Västtrafik branded trains. Boats and trams are owned and operated by the respective municipality.

The whole of Gothenburg's public transport network is equipped with sensors which track the location of every bus or tram at any given time. The system allows riders to estimate when a tram or bus will be leaving from the next stop in real time. This information is displayed online and in bus and tram shelters, indicating any delays affecting the next bus or tram.

== Fare zones and ticketing ==
Västtrafik's service area is divided into three geographic fare zones—Zone A, Zone B, and Zone C—covering Västra Götaland County and Kungsbacka Municipality. Zone A encompasses Gothenburg, Mölndal, Partille, and Öckerö, Zone B covers surrounding commuter municipalities including Kungsbacka, Kungälv, Ale, and Lerum, and Zone C covers the remainder of Västra Götaland.

Tickets are sold primarily through the mobile application Västtrafik To Go, contactless bank cards (blippbetalning) onboard vehicles, and physical smart cards (Västtrafikkort) available at sales agents. Available fare options include single-journey tickets, 24-hour and 72-hour passes, and 30-, 90-, and 365-day period tickets.

== Violence against staff ==
In 2018, train staff received body worn cameras after an escalating number of violence and threats against staff. The most common problematic situations arose when a single staff member checked a group of people where none had tickets. In such situations, staff members would be threatened and spat on.

== Gallery ==
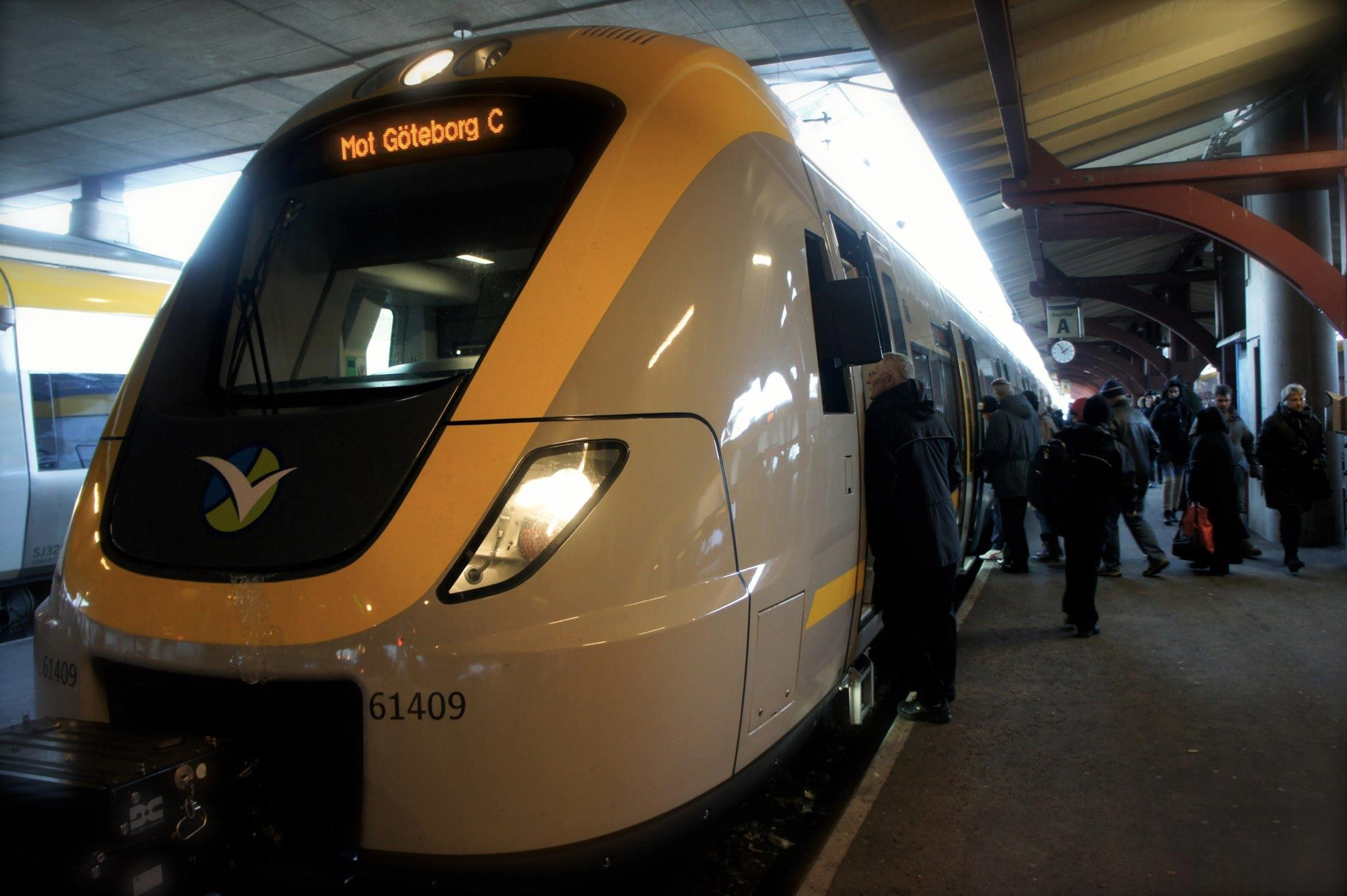
An X61 commuter train at Gothenburg Central Station

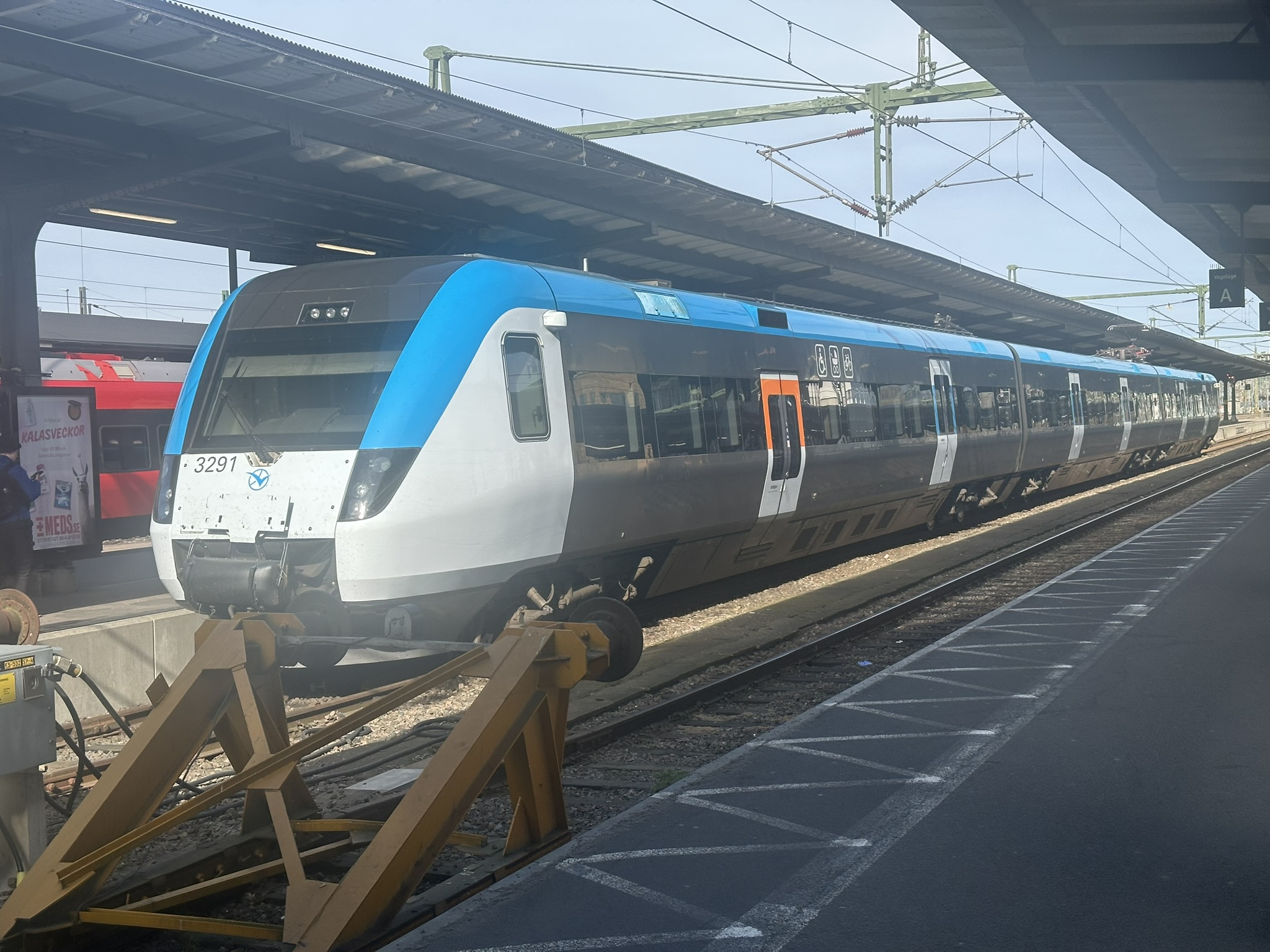
Västtrafik X50 regional train at Gothenburg C

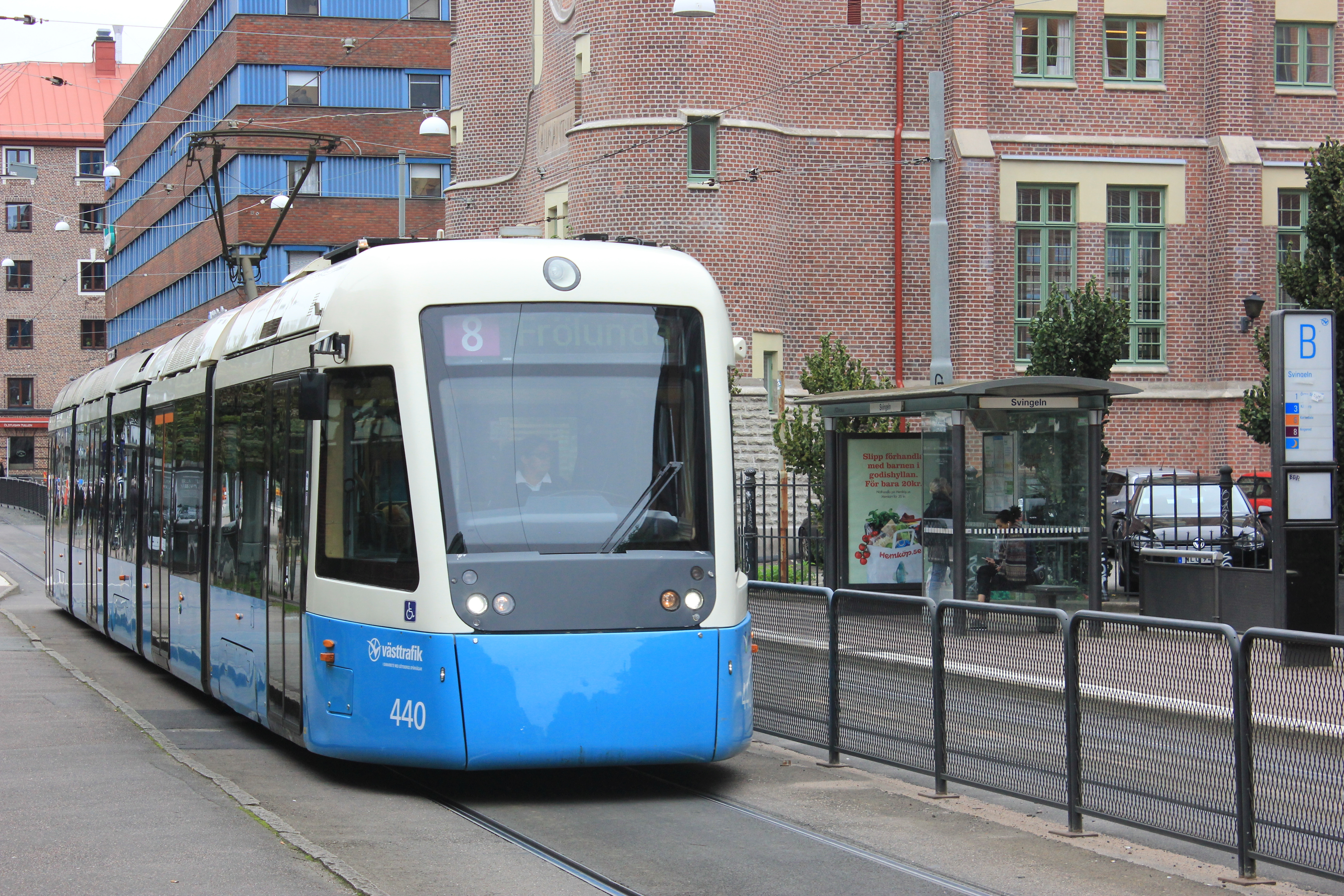
An M32 tram in Gothenburg

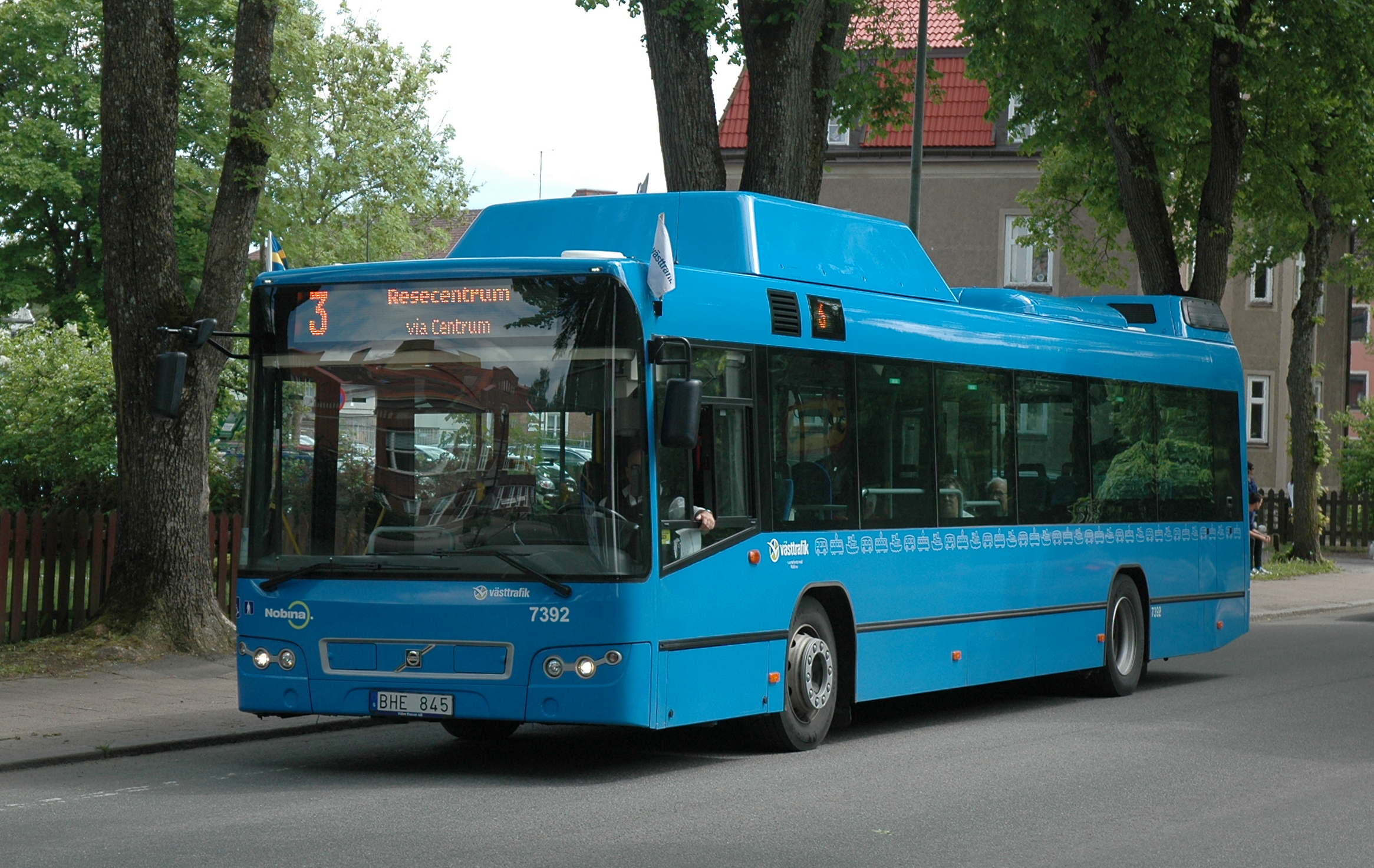
A Västtrafik Volvo 7700 CNG bus in Falköping

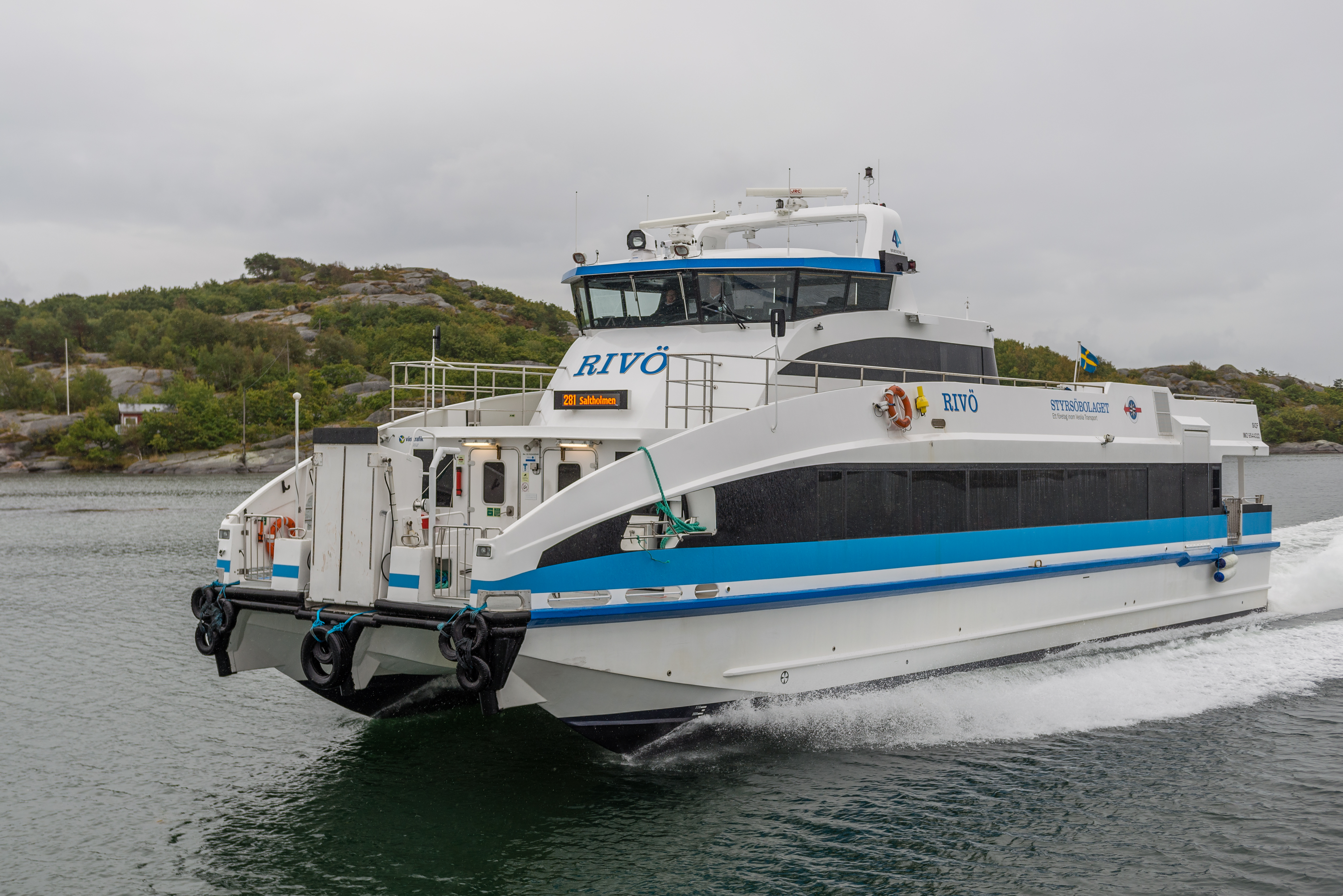
A Västtrafik boat in Gothenburg archipelago

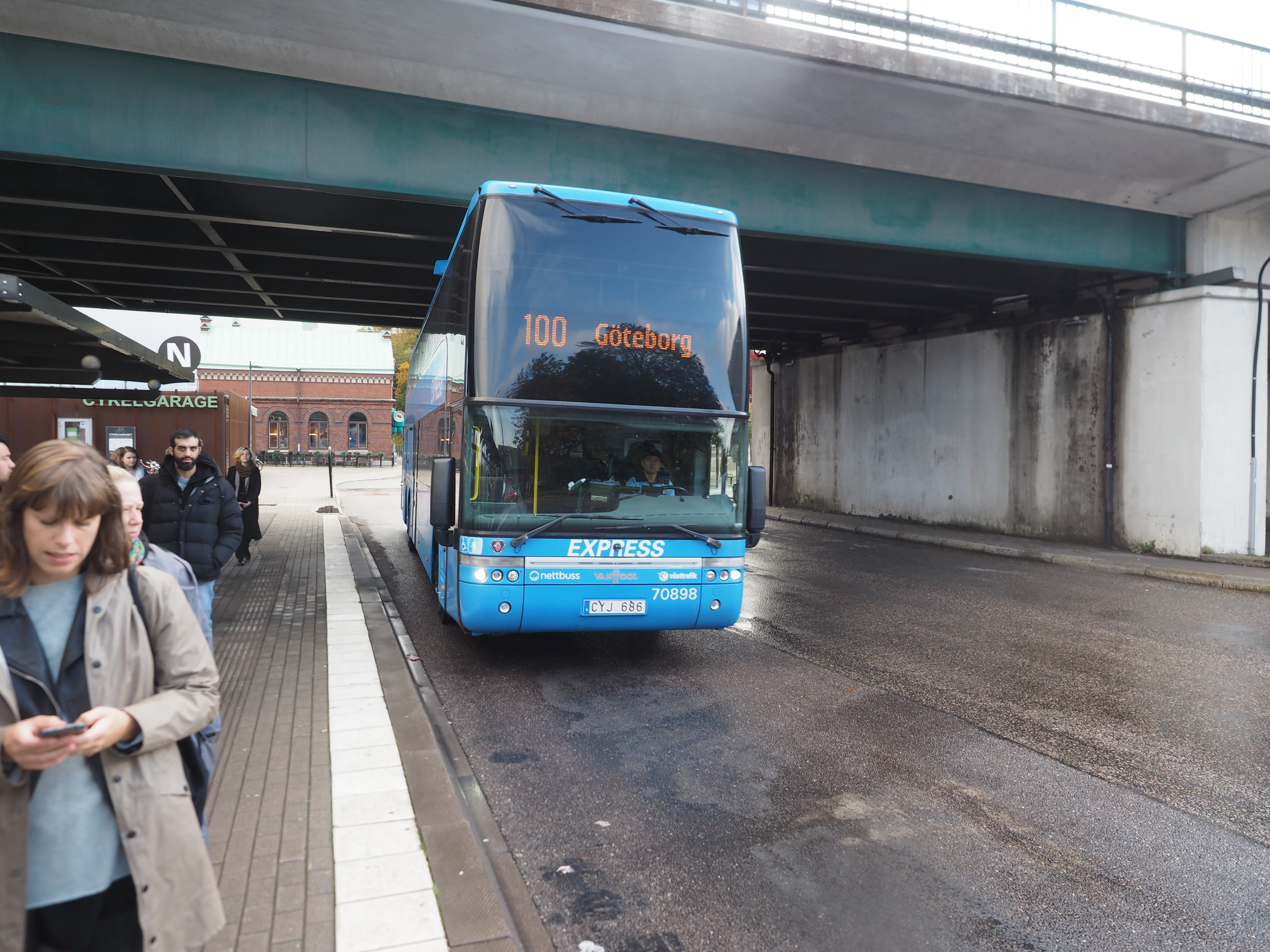
A Västtrafik Van Hool TD927 Astromega coach on line 100 to Gothenburg arriving at Borås
