= Ramlösa Station =

Railway station in Ramlösa (Helsingborg), Sweden

Ramlösa
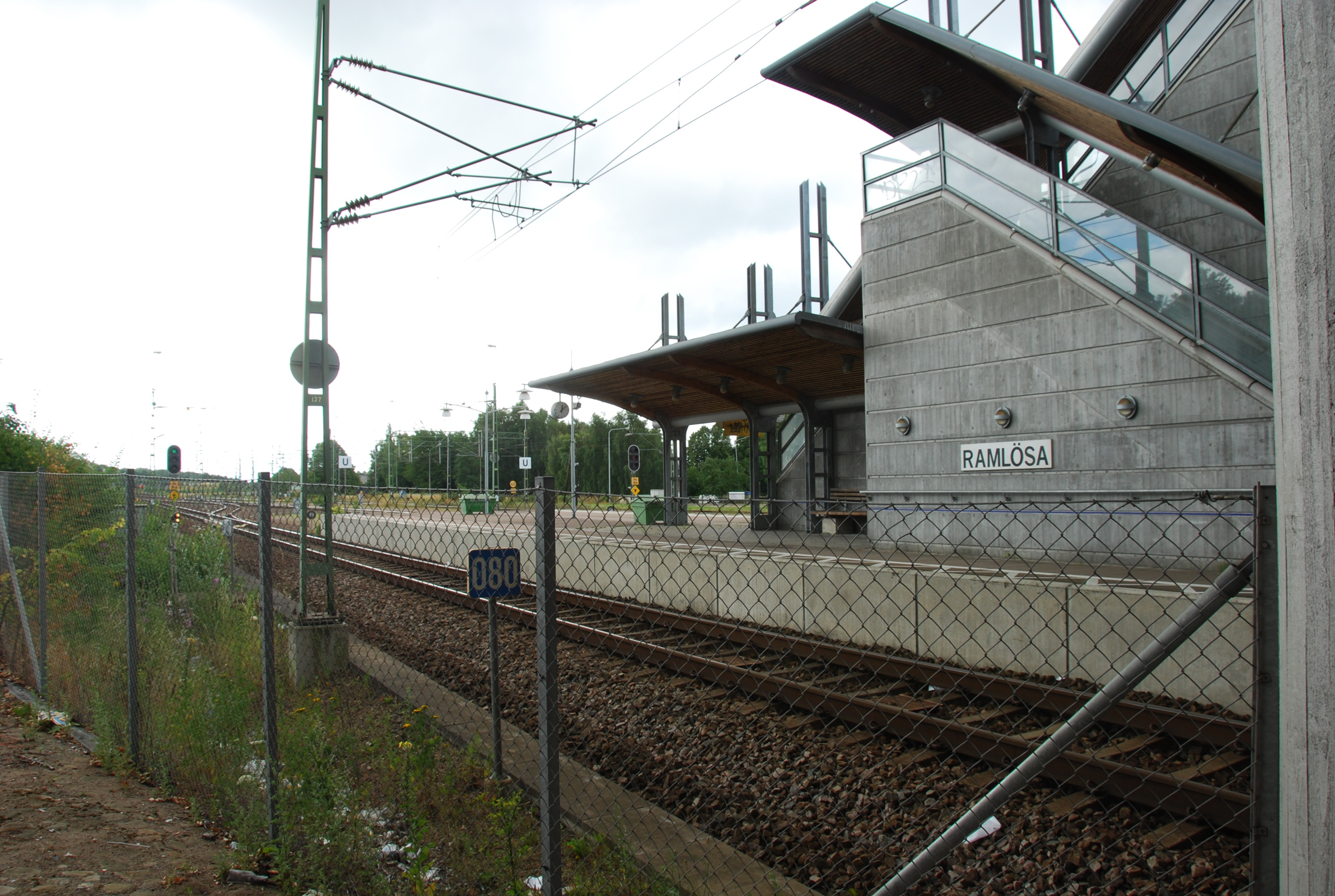
- Ramlösa Station as seen from the west

General information
- Location: Helsingborg; Sweden
- Coordinates: 56°1′25″N 12°43′39″E
- Lines: West Coast Line; Råå Line; Skåne Line
- Platforms: 1
- Tracks: 2
- Train operators: Skånetrafiken (Pågatågen)

Construction
- Parking: Yes
- Cycle facilities: Yes
- Accessible: Yes

Other information
- Station code: Hbgb

History
- Opened: 1865

Passengers
- 3 080 per weekday (2016)

Services
Preceding station	Pågatågen	Following station
Rydebäck towards Hyllie via Landskrona	Line 2A	Helsingborg C Terminus
Gantofta towards Hyllie via Teckomatorp	Line 3	Helsingborg C Terminus
Helsingborg C Terminus	Line 5	Påarp towards Kristianstad C
Location

Ramlösa Station is a railway station in the Ramlösa district of Helsingborg in Sweden. The station was inaugurated in its current form in 1865 and mainly serves commuter trains Pågatågen. On the Hästhag Viaduct above, the station is connected to both city buses and regional buses. Internally for traffic management the station is called Helsingborg godsbangård (Hbgb) (Helsingborg freight yard), the only station in Sweden with a totally different name between traffic management and towards passengers.

The station serves three Pågatågen lines as it connects the West Coast Line with trains towards Åstorp, Hässleholm and Teckomatorp, Eslöv. Öresundståg also call at the station though not all services. It is one of three passenger railway stations located in the city of Helsingborg, along with Helsingborg Central Station and Maria Station, of which it is the southernmost situated railway station of the city.

== Design ==
The station is located under the Hästhag Viaduct at the Ramlösa traffic area next to the Malmö road (E4). It is located between the districts Elineberg and Ramlösa in the east and Miatorp in the west. The station consists of an island platform with tracks on either side. Architecturally, it was designed by Michelsen Arkitekter through Sonny Mattsson and Mircea Barsan and was completed in its current form in 1998. The design includes the entire Hästhag Viaduct, which has been widened to make room for bus stops as well as pedestrian and cycle paths. The viaduct rests at both ends on plinths in red-colored concrete with marked horizontal joints. The station is located next to the eastern plinth, which is decorated with an artwork by Jörgen Nash. On this side there is also parking for bicycles and cars.

The platform roofs are light and covered with sheet metal on the upper side, while the lower side is covered with wooden rods. The roof is supported partly by wooden beams from below, and steel braces from above. In the far north there is a glass cure for wind protection. The station is reached from the viaduct via a staircase in gray concrete with a similar design to the viaduct's plinths. The stairs are covered by roofs in the same design as the platform roofs. The stairwell also contains a staircase from the underpass under the tracks from the bicycle and car parking. Next to the stairwell is a glazed lift tower that connects the viaduct, the platform and the underpass.

== The freight yard ==
The platforms are located within the operating site of a Helsingborg freight rail yard. The freight yard has 31 tracks in addition to the two tracks used by passenger trains to enter the station.

== History ==
The first station on the site was built privately and opened in 1865 with the construction of the railway between Helsingborg and Eslöv. It was built on the same site as a former race track; this had been used, among other things, at the Olympic Games in Ramlösa in 1834 and 1836.

During the construction of the railway to Hässleholm in 1875, the railway branched south of Ramlösa station eastwards past Ramlösa Hälsobrunn. A station was built here under the name "Ramlösa Brunns station", which should not be confused with Ramlösa station. To avoid confusion, it was proposed that Ramlösa station should be renamed "Hästhagen" after the large horse paddocks that previously existed in the area. However, this was never implemented.

The construction of Ramlösa Brunns station meant that residential development in Ramlösa came to be concentrated around it, while Ramlösa station was increasingly used by the emerging industries in Raus plantation west of the station. Ramlösa station was taken over by the state in 1938 and by the SJ in 1940. It was converted to electric operation in 1943. On May 31, 1970, the station changed its name to "Helsingborgs goods railway station". Due to increased demand for commuting facilities, the station opened in 1983 for pågatåg service. In connection with the expansion of the West Coast Line, the station was rebuilt in 1997–1998 after an architectural competition and thus got its current appearance.

== See also ==
- Rail transport in Sweden
