= West Coast Line (Sweden) =

Railway line in Sweden

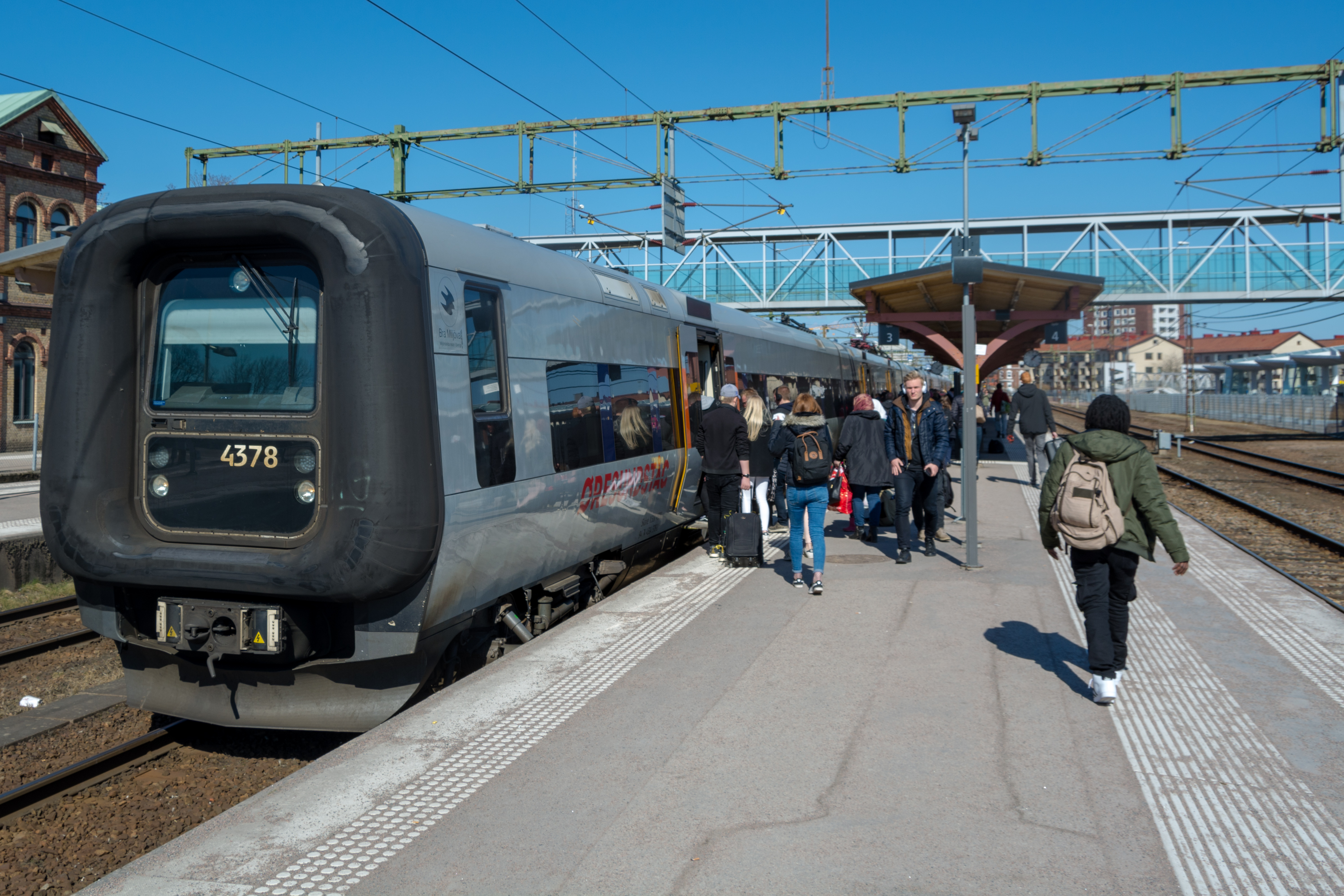
- Halmstad Station

Overview
- Owner: Swedish Transport Administration
- Locale: Sweden
- Termini: Gothenburg Central Station; Lund Central Station

Service
- Operator: Swedish Transport Administration
- Rolling stock: BM74; X2; X31K; X55; X61; X74

Technical
- Line length: 283 kilometres (176 mi)
- Number of tracks: 2 (Helsingborg C - Maria is the only single track part remaining)
- Track gauge: 1,435 mm (4 ft 8 1/2 in) standard gauge
- Electrification: 15 kV, 16 2/3 Hz Overhead catenary
- Operating speed: 200 km/h (125 mph)

The West Coast Line (Swedish: Västkustbanan) is an electrified railway line between Gothenburg and Lund, which runs along the West Coast of Sweden. Originally completed in 1888 with the opening of the Gothenburg–Hallands Railway, major redevelopment has been ongoing since the 1980s, using mostly new rights of way with softer curves for a future maximum speed of 250 km/h (155 mph). As of 2025 the expansion has not been completed, as a single section in Helsingborg remains single-track.

In northern Helsingborg the track follows a 150 year old right of way, which has tight curves together with a steep climb. Double track construction did take place between 2020 and 2023. Although the track in northern Helsingborg will remain as it is for several more years.

A double track tunnel under the city of Varberg began construction in 2019, its completion in 2025 replaced a single track railway running through the city center.

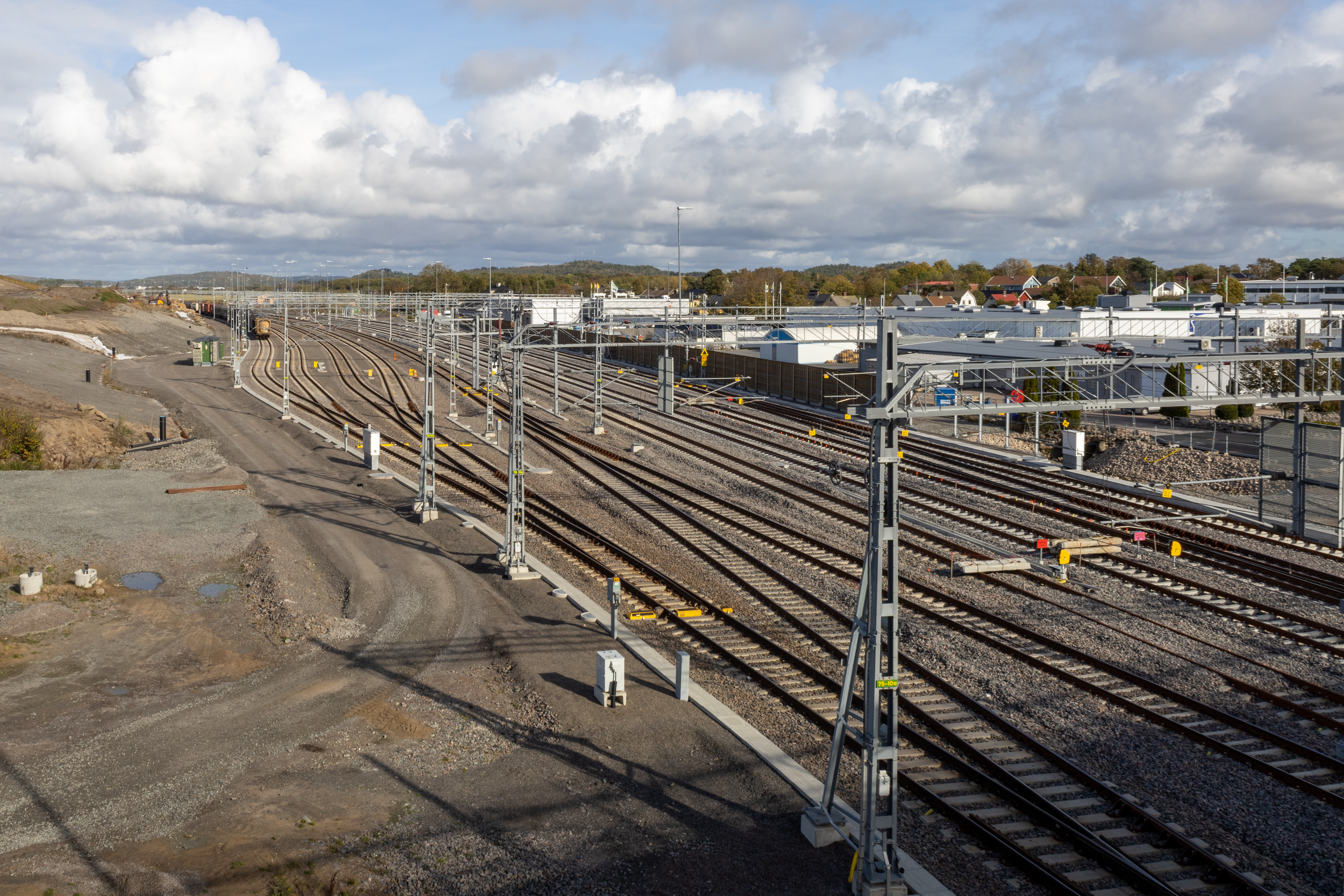
The new tunnel in Varberg during construction in 2022

== Stations with passenger stops ==
- Gothenburg (fast, regional and local trains)
- Liseberg (local trains)
- Mölndal (regional and local trains)
- Kållered (local trains)
- Lindome (local trains)
- Anneberg (local trains)
- Hede (local trains)
- Kungsbacka (regional and local trains)
- Åsa (regional trains)
- Varberg (regional trains)
- Falkenberg (regional trains)
- Halmstad (fast, regional and local trains)
- Laholm (regional and local trains)
- Båstad (regional and local trains)
- Förslöv (local trains)
- Barkåkra (local trains)
- Ängelholm (regional and local trains)
- Kattarp (local trains)
- Ödåkra (local trains)
- Maria (local trains)
- Helsingborg (fast, regional and local trains)
- Ramlösa (local trains)
- Rydebäck (local trains)
- Glumslöv (local trains)
- Landskrona (regional and local trains)
- Häljarp (local trains)
- Dösjebro (local trains)
- Kävlinge (local trains)
- Gunnesbo (local trains)
- Lund (fast, regional and local trains)

The local trains are branded Västtågen between Gothenburg and Kungsbacka and branded Pågatågen between Halmstad and Lund. The regional trains are branded Öresundståg and the fast trains are operated by SJ and Vy, all of which continue south of Lund.

== Route ==
The West Coast Line is 284 kilometres long and runs along the southern part of Sweden's west coast from Gothenburg in the north to Lund in the south, passing through the entire county of Halland. The line is double-tracked except for the 4.5-kilometre section between Helsingborg C and Maria station, which is planned to be extended. The extension may involve a double-track tunnel north of Helsingborg C replacing the current section. The line runs parallel to the E6 motorway on several sections and, together with the motorway, forms an important transport route between Gothenburg and Lund, as well as Malmö via the Southern Main Line. The line has been expanded in several places along the route during the 1990s and 2000s, with good geometric conditions and gentle curves, allowing for high speeds. The West Coast Line is most heavily used between Lund and Helsingborg and between Gothenburg and Kungsbacka. This is because, in addition to regional and long-distance trains, these sections also have a high volume of traffic from Pågatåg and Västtåg.

There are several connecting railways along the line, making the West Coast Line a central part of the Swedish railway network:

- Southern Main Line
- Freight route through Skåne
- Rååbanan
- Skånebanan
- Markarydsbanan
- Halmstad–Nässjö railway line
- Viskadalsbanan
- Coast to Coast Line
- Western Main Line

The West Coast Line has been studied for an increased maximum speed of 250 km/h. The Varberg-Halmstad and Halmstad-Helsingborg sections were considered most suitable based on mixed traffic on the line, including long-distance trains, regional trains, local trains and freight trains.

The Landskrona–Ramlösa section has a steep gradient of up to 25 per mille. This means that only passenger trains run on the Lund–Kävlinge and Landskrona–Helsingborg sections. Freight traffic instead runs on the freight route through Skåne. There are four level crossings, all on older sections of track, one in Helsingborg and three in Halmstad.

== Services ==
Passenger traffic on the West Coast Line consists partly of traffic organised by the regional public transport authorities (Öresundståg, Pågatågen and Västtågen) and partly of long-distance trains operated by SJ AB and Vy. During the summer, VR Snabbtåg Sverige long-distance trains also run on the line.

In addition to passenger trains, the West Coast Line is also used by freight trains. Before the Hallandsås Tunnel was completed, most of these trains ran via Halmstad–Markaryd–Hässleholm, as Hallandsåsen was too steep for many trains. Since December 2015, many of these trains have been running through the tunnel and south of Ängelholm via Åstorp and the Söderåsbanan line to Malmö or Trelleborg.
