= Klostergården Station =

Railway station in Klostergården (Lund), Sweden

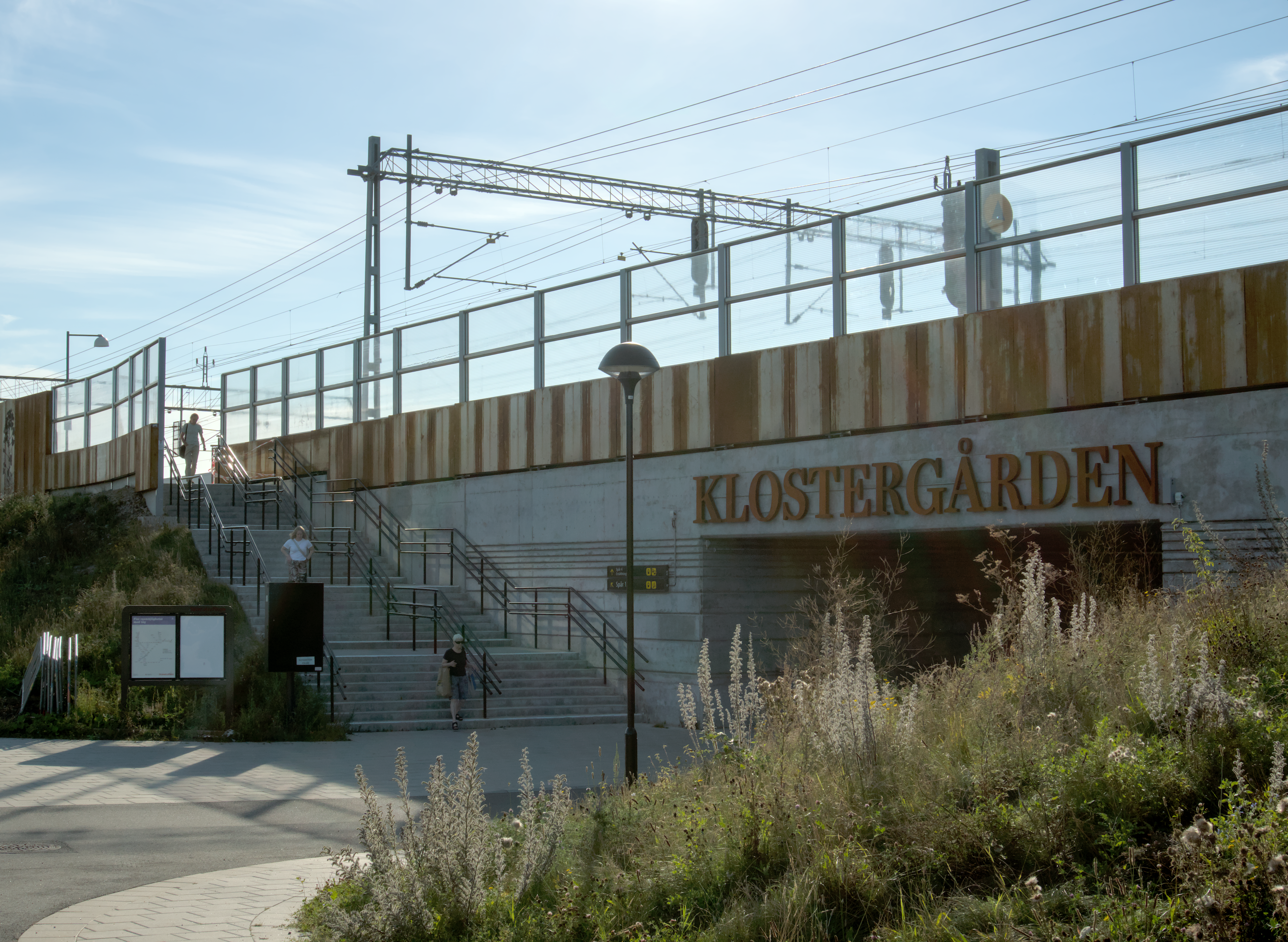

General information
- Location: Lund, Lund Municipality; Sweden
- Coordinates: 55°41′40″N 13°10′17″E
- Line: Southern Main Line
- Platforms: 2 side platforms
- Tracks: 4
- Train operators: Skånetrafiken (Pågatågen)

Other information
- Station code: Kgå

History
- Opened: 2023

Services
Preceding station	Pågatågen	Following station
Hjärup towards Hyllie	Line 2A	Lund C towards Helsingborg C
Hjärup towards Hyllie	Line 4	Lund C towards Kristianstad C
Hjärup towards Simrishamn	Line 6	Lund C Terminus
Hjärup towards Trelleborg	Line 9	Lund C Terminus
Location

Klostergården Station is a commuter train railway station in the city district of Klostergården in southwest Lund, Sweden. The station was opened in December 2023 and is served by Pågatågen trains.

The station was opened in connection with the Swedish Transport Administration having completed the quadruple track expansion of the Southern Main Line from Arlöv (north of Malmö) to the south of Lund. The station is located nearby Klostergårdens IP.

== History ==
In February 2020 clearance to build the station was given by Lund Municipality. Construction work began in the summer of 2020 and is estimated to have cost approximately SEK 118 million.
