= Gunnesbo Station =

Railway station in Gunnesbo (Lund), Sweden

Gunnesbo station
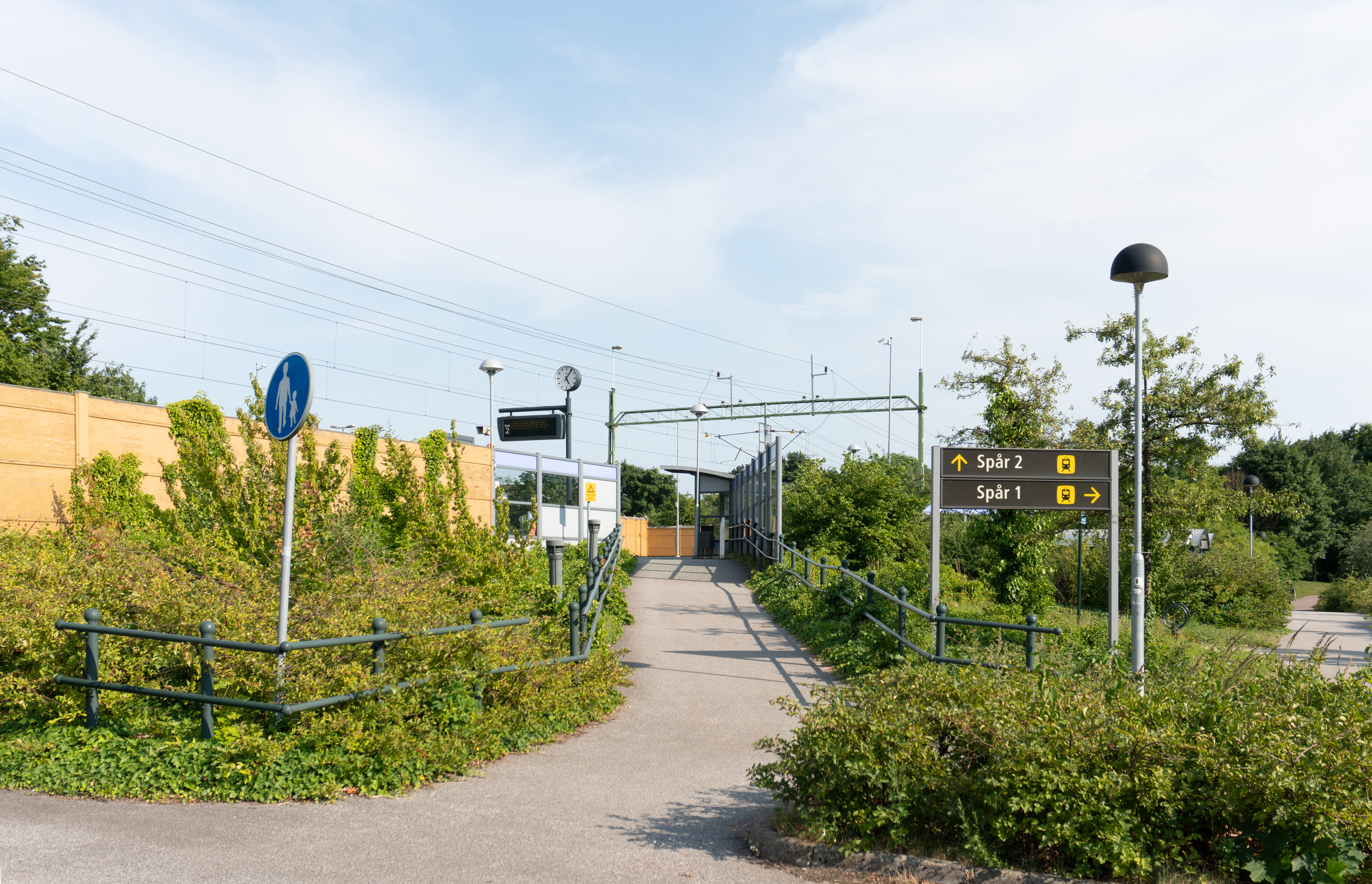
- Gunnesbo station on the West Coast Line in Lund, Sweden

General information
- Location: Lund, Lund Municipality; Sweden
- Coordinates: 55°43′37″N 13°10′03″E
- Line: West Coast Line
- Platforms: 2
- Tracks: 2
- Train operators: Skånetrafiken (Pågatågen)

Other information
- Station code: Gnb

History
- Opened: 1986

Passengers
- 1 600 per weekday (2016)

Services
Preceding station	Pågatågen	Following station
Lund C towards Hyllie	Line 2A	Kävlinge towards Helsingborg C
Lund C towards Hyllie	Line 8	Kävlinge towards Åstorp
Location

Gunnesbo Station is a commuter train railway station in the Gunnesbo district of Lund in Sweden. The station was inaugurated on 1 June 1986 to serve commuters in the newly built districts Nöbbelöv and Gunnesbo along the West Coast Line. The local trains (Pågatåg) serve the station.

The station was expanded in 2003–2005 for the double track that now runs through Lund along the West Coast Line.

== See also ==
- Rail transport in Sweden
