= Maria Station =

Railway station in Maria (Helsingborg), Sweden

Maria
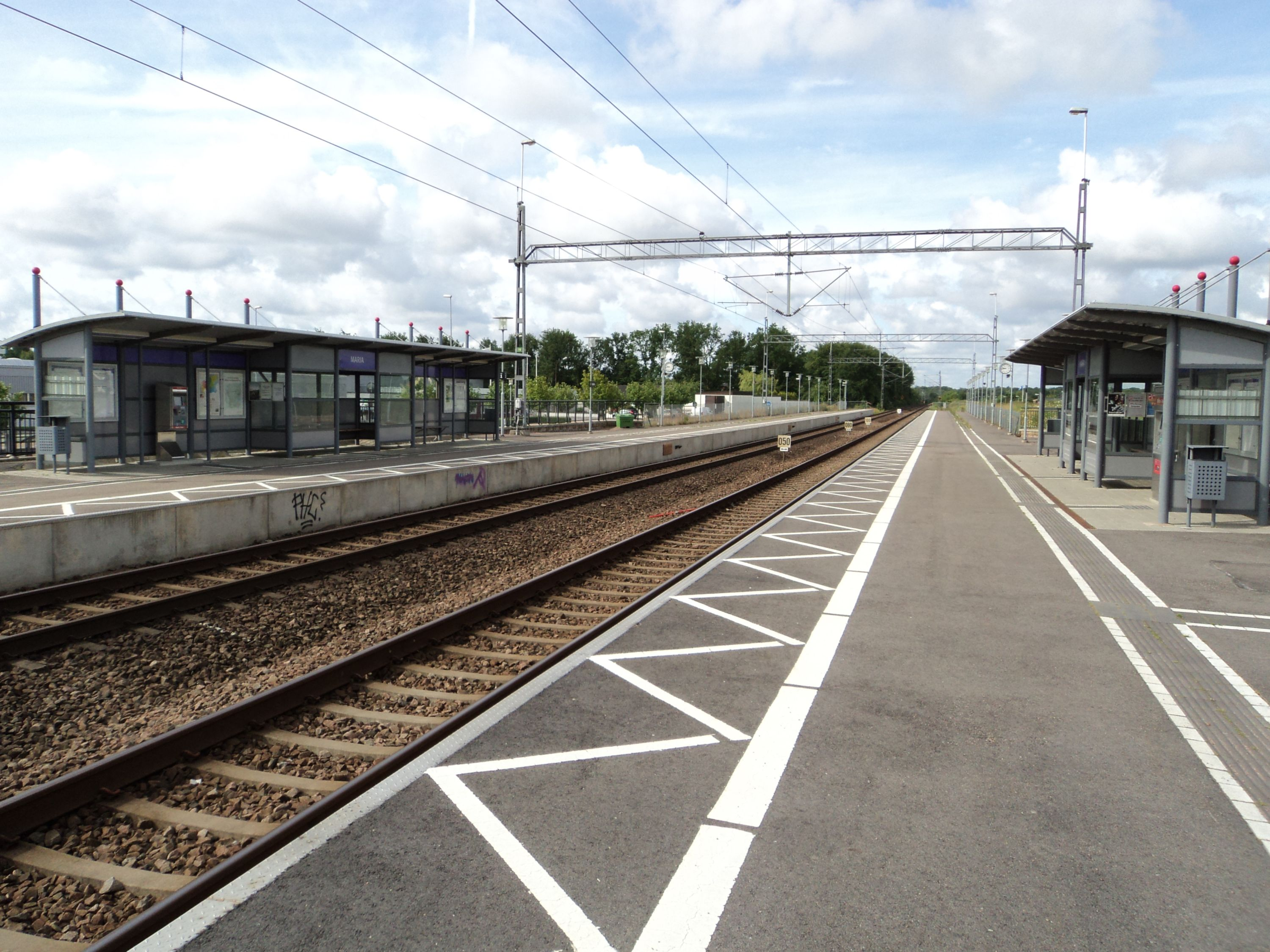
- Maria station in July 2010

General information
- Location: Helsingborg; Sweden
- Coordinates: 56°4′35″N 12°42′40″E
- Line: West Coast Line
- Platforms: 2
- Tracks: 2
- Train operators: Skånetrafiken (Pågatågen)

Other information
- Station code: Mia

History
- Opened: 1999

Services
Preceding station	Pågatågen	Following station
Helsingborg C Terminus	Line 2B	Ödåkra towards Halmstad
Location

Maria Station is a railway station for commuter trains located on the West Coast Line in the northern parts of Helsingborg, Sweden. The station was inaugurated in 1999 and currently consists of two platforms and two tracks. The local trains (Pågatåg) serve the station. It is named after the neighborhood Mariastaden (Maria town) which is named after the Santa Maria church located here. It is one of three passenger railway stations located in the urban area of the city of Helsingborg, along with Helsingborg C and Ramlösa Station, of which it is the northernmost situated railway station of the city. Helsingborg Municipality has however ten railway stations where passengers can embark.

== Expansion plans ==
With the expansion of Mariastaden and the Maria station area, travel from the station is expected to increase and to meet the capacity requirement the double-track expansion of the Västkustbanan between Maria station and Ängelholm was finished in 2024.

The railway between Maria and the Helsingborg's central station is still single track. It is planned to be rebuilt to double track through construction of the Tågaborg Tunnel. When the construction of this tunnel can be carried out is still unclear.

== See also ==
- Rail transport in Sweden
