= Lund Central Station =

Railway station in Lund, Sweden

Lund C
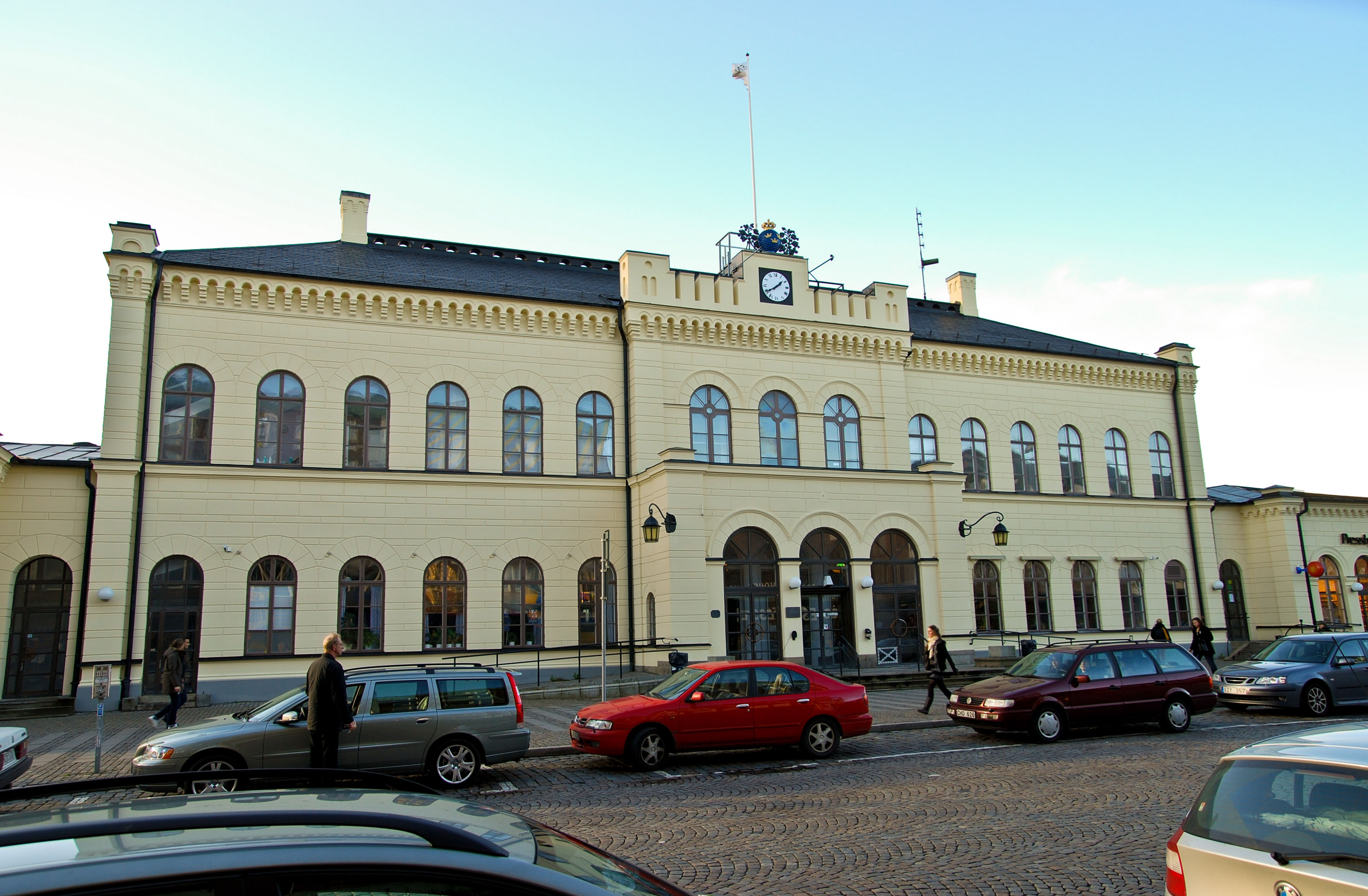

General information
- Location: Bangatan 1; 222 21 Lund; Sweden
- Coordinates: 55°42′19″N 13°11′14″E
- Elevation: 41 m (135 ft)
- Owner: Jernhusen (station infrastructure); Trafikverket (rail infrastructure)
- Operator: SJ
- Lines: Malmö-Katrineholm; Lund-Göteborg
- Platforms: 4
- Tracks: 6

History
- Opened: 1858; 168 years ago

Services
Preceding station	SJ	Following station
Hässleholm towards Stockholm C	Southern Main Line	Malmö C towards Köpenhamn H
Hässleholm towards Stockholm C	EuroNight	Malmö C towards Hamburg Hbf or Berlin Hbf
Helsingborg C towards Göteborg C	West Coast Line	Malmö C Terminus
Preceding station	Regional trains	Following station
Helsingborg C towards Oslo S	RE20	Malmö C Terminus
Preceding station	Long distance trains	Following station
Hässleholm towards Stockholm C	Snälltåget	Malmö C Terminus
Hässleholm towards Stockholm C	Snälltåget seasonal	Malmö C towards Berlin Hbf
Hässleholm towards Duved	Snälltåget seasonal	Malmö C Terminus
Preceding station	Øresundståg	Following station
Malmö C towards Østerport	Copenhagen–Lund Øresundståg	Terminus
Malmö C towards Østerport	Copenhagen–Gothenburg Øresundståg	Landskrona towards Göteborg C
Malmö C towards Østerport	Copenhagen–Kalmar Øresundståg	Eslöv towards Kalmar C
Malmö C towards Østerport	Copenhagen–Karlskrona Øresundståg	Eslöv towards Karlskrona C
Preceding station	Pågatågen	Following station
Burlöv towards Hyllie	Line 2A	Gunnesbo towards Helsingborg C
Burlöv towards Hyllie	Line 3	Eslöv towards Helsingborg C
Klostergården towards Hyllie	Line 4	Stångby towards Kristianstad C
Klostergården towards Simrishamn	Line 6	Terminus
Burlöv towards Hyllie	Line 8	Gunnesbo towards Åstorp
Klostergården towards Trelleborg	Line 9	Terminus
Location

Lund Central Station (Swedish: Lunds centralstation) or Lund C is the main railway station of Lund, Sweden and one of the busiest train stations in Sweden. It is located on the Southern Main Line and the West Coast Line.

There is a number of restaurants and convenience stores located in the station. ICA Malmborgs supermarket is located right next to the station.

The station is connected by railway to Kävlinge (Helsingborg, Gothenburg), Eslöv (Kristianstad, Kalmar, Stockholm), and Teckomatorp in the north direction. It connects in the south direction to Malmö, Ystad, Trelleborg and Copenhagen. There were previously direct railway connections to Bjärred and Harlösa. A direct train trip to Copenhagen Airport goes every 15 minutes and the journey takes about 35 minutes.

The station building was built in the 1850s and opened in Feb of 1858. It is one of the oldest still active train stations in Sweden. An expansion during 1872-1875 was drawn by Adolf Wilhelm Edelsvärd and another expansion 1923-1926 was drawn by Folke Zettervall. A significant expansion is in planning phase since 2015. Various options, including a fully underground station are under consideration.

This station is the terminus of the Lund tramway.

== Gallery ==
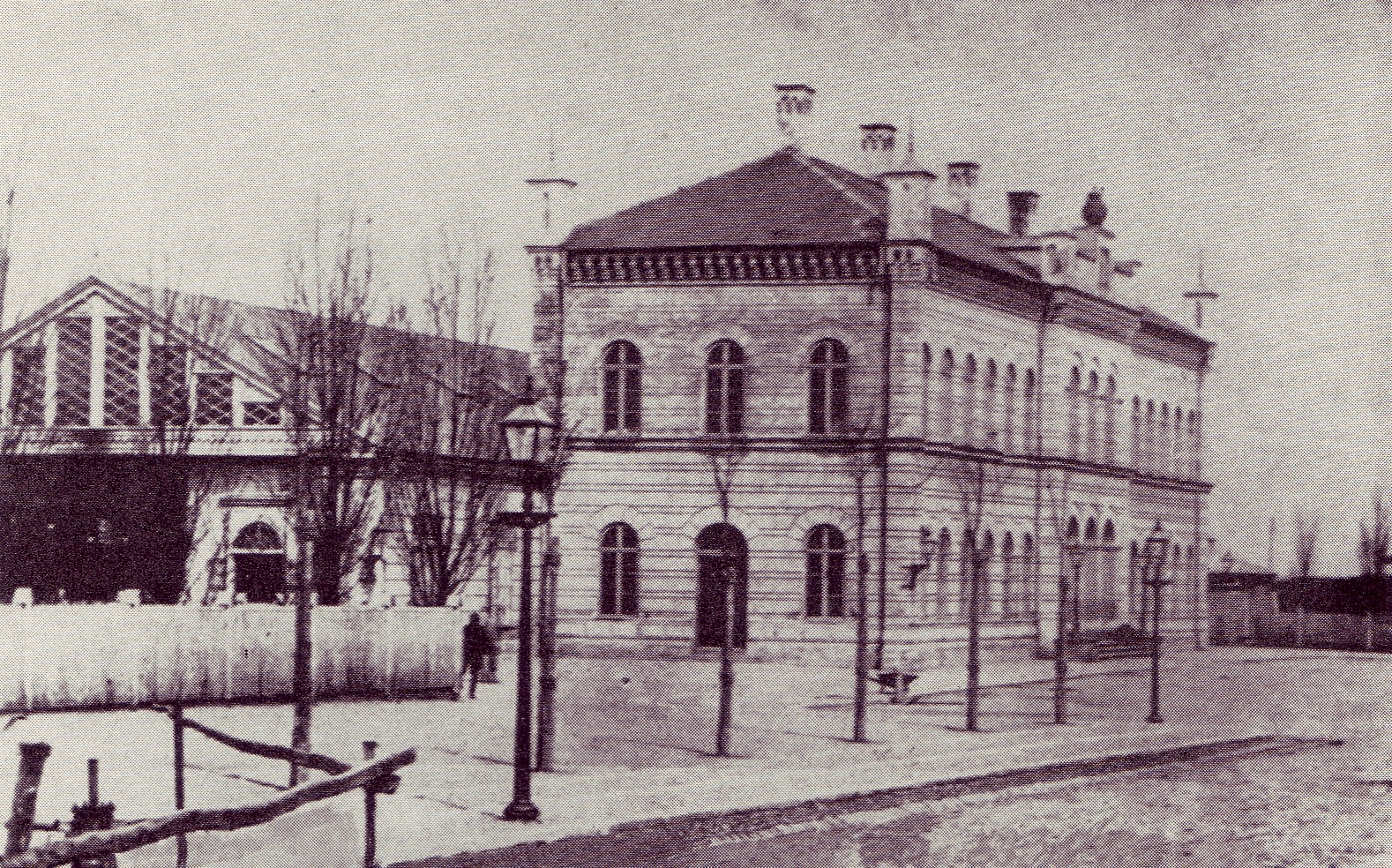
Lund's station in 1860s

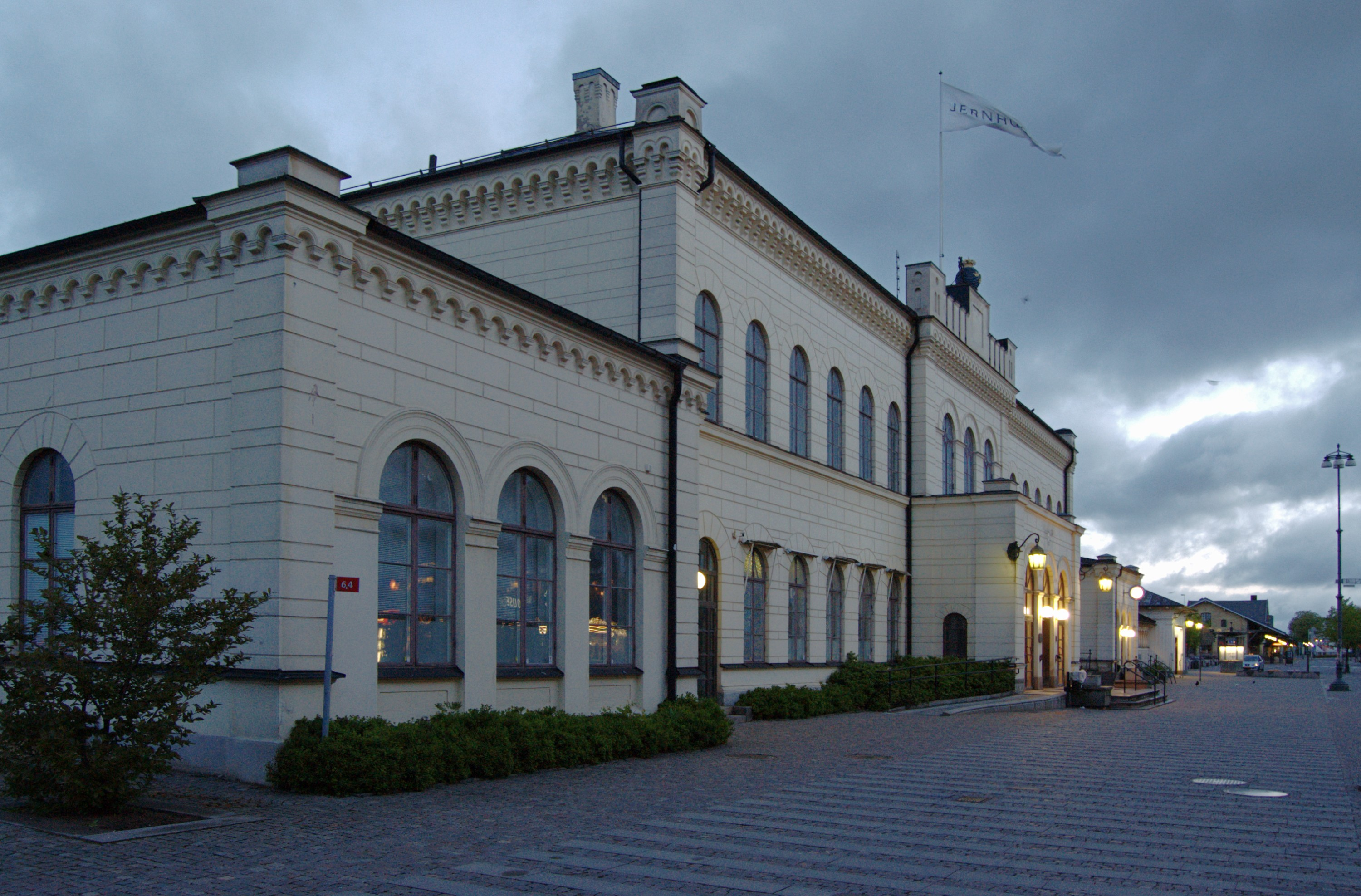
Eastern entrance
