= Helsingborg Central Station =

Railway station in Helsingborg, Sweden

Helsingborg C
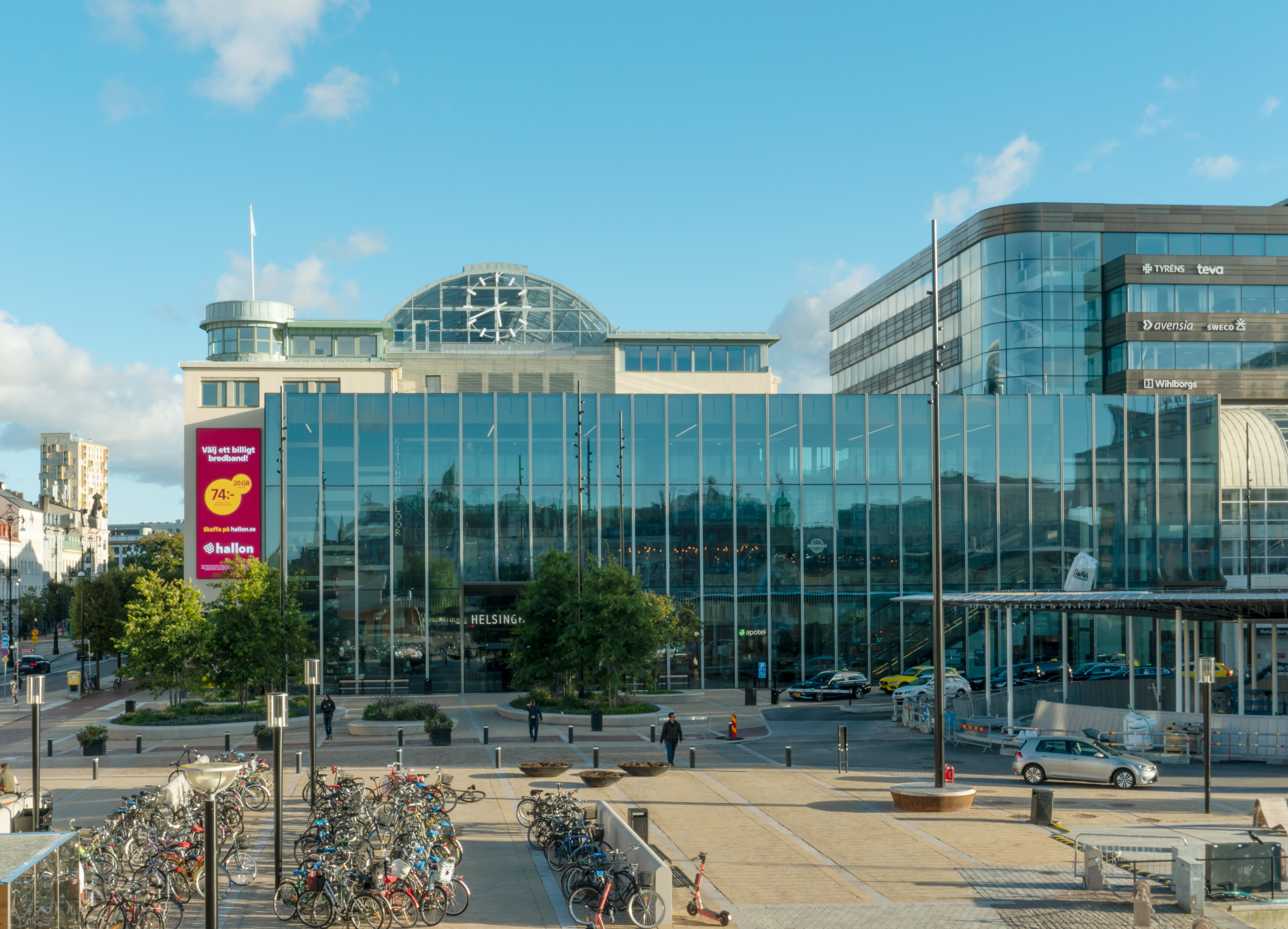
- Helsingborg Central Station in 2022

General information
- Location: Helsingborg, Helsingborgs Stad; Sweden
- Coordinates: 56°2′40″N 12°41′40″E
- Elevation: 10 metres (33 ft) below sea
- Owner: Wihlborgs
- Line: West Coast Line
- Platforms: 3
- Tracks: 6
- Train operators: Skånetrafiken (Pågatågen); Øresundståg; SJ
- Connections: Bus and ferry

Construction
- Structure type: Underground (Tracks 1-4); Above ground (Tracks 6-7)
- Parking: Yes
- Accessible: Yes

Other information
- Station code: Hb

History
- Opened: 1991

Passengers
- 24 100 per weekday (2016)

Services
Preceding station	SJ	Following station
Hässleholm towards Stockholm C	Southern Main Line night train only	Lund C towards Malmö C
Halmstad C towards Göteborg C	West Coast Line	Lund C towards Malmö C
Preceding station	Regional trains	Following station
Halmstad C towards Oslo S	RE20	Lund C towards Malmö C
Preceding station	Øresundståg	Following station
Landskrona towards Østerport	Copenhagen–Gothenburg Øresundståg	Ängelholm towards Göteborg C
Preceding station	Pågatågen	Following station
Ramlösa towards Hyllie via Landskrona	Line 2A	Terminus
Terminus	Line 2B	Maria towards Halmstad
Ramlösa towards Hyllie via Teckomatorp	Line 3	Terminus
Terminus	Line 5	Ramlösa towards Kristianstad C
Location

Helsingborg Central Station or 'Helsingborg C', also colloquially known as Knutpunkten is the primary railway station in Helsingborg. It is a transit hub for ferries, long-distance trains (SJ), Öresundståg, Pågatåg, city- and regional buses. It is one of Sweden's busiest transit hub facilities.

The railway station is the eleventh largest in Sweden with 24,100 passengers per weekday (2016). This includes passengers on the ferry and bus services. In total, Knutpunkten is visited by approximately 45,000 people daily. The building is a large complex that also contains restaurants, pubs, shops and office space. Next to Knutpunkten is the contemporary Elite Hotel Marina Plaza with 197 rooms. As a railway station, it is one of the largest station buildings in Sweden and one of Sweden's eight stations with underground railway tracks in the Helsingborg Tunnel. There are two platforms underground (four tracks). There is also a platform above ground, which, however, is not in regular use but is used for parking trains. It will be opened for regular trains during 2024. The building also contains several administrative functions for the city of Helsingborg such as the City Building Administration, and since 2016 also an office hotel for business activities.

== Transits ==
Knutpunkten is Helsingborg's largest railway station (out of three within the conurbation and ten in total within Helsingborg's municipality) and one of the largest in Sweden. The other two railway stations in the city are Maria Station heading north, and Ramlösa Station heading south.

Nowadays, Öresund trains go to Gothenburg, Malmö and Copenhagen via Landskrona. There are also Pågatåg to Förslöv and Halmstad and also to Kristianstad (via Hässleholm and Åstorp) and to Trelleborg via Landskrona and towards Ystad via Eslöv. SJ also serves Helsingborg as part of the Malmö-Helsingborg-Gothenburg line, after not serving the city in 2011–2015. South of the underground railway station (with four tracks) the West Coast Line is double track. North of the station, traffic is routed under Helsingborg in the single-track Helsingborg tunnel and continues through Pålsjö forest above ground to Maria Station. From 2024, this segment will be the only remaining section of the Västkustbanan that has not been expanded to double tracks.

Regional buses and express buses have a bus terminal at Knutpunkten, which was inaugurated in 2005. City buses mostly stop on the street outside of the station building.

In 2015, Scandlines and HH Ferries were consolidated as ForSea Ferries which now runs all the passenger ferry services between Helsingborg and Helsingør. The brand name Scandlines was discontinued for the route in 2018.

At the end of 2023, platforms are to be put into use 200 meters south of the main building for passenger trains to Hässleholm, Eslöv and more, to expand capacity in connection with the double track construction on the West Coast Line.

== Building ==
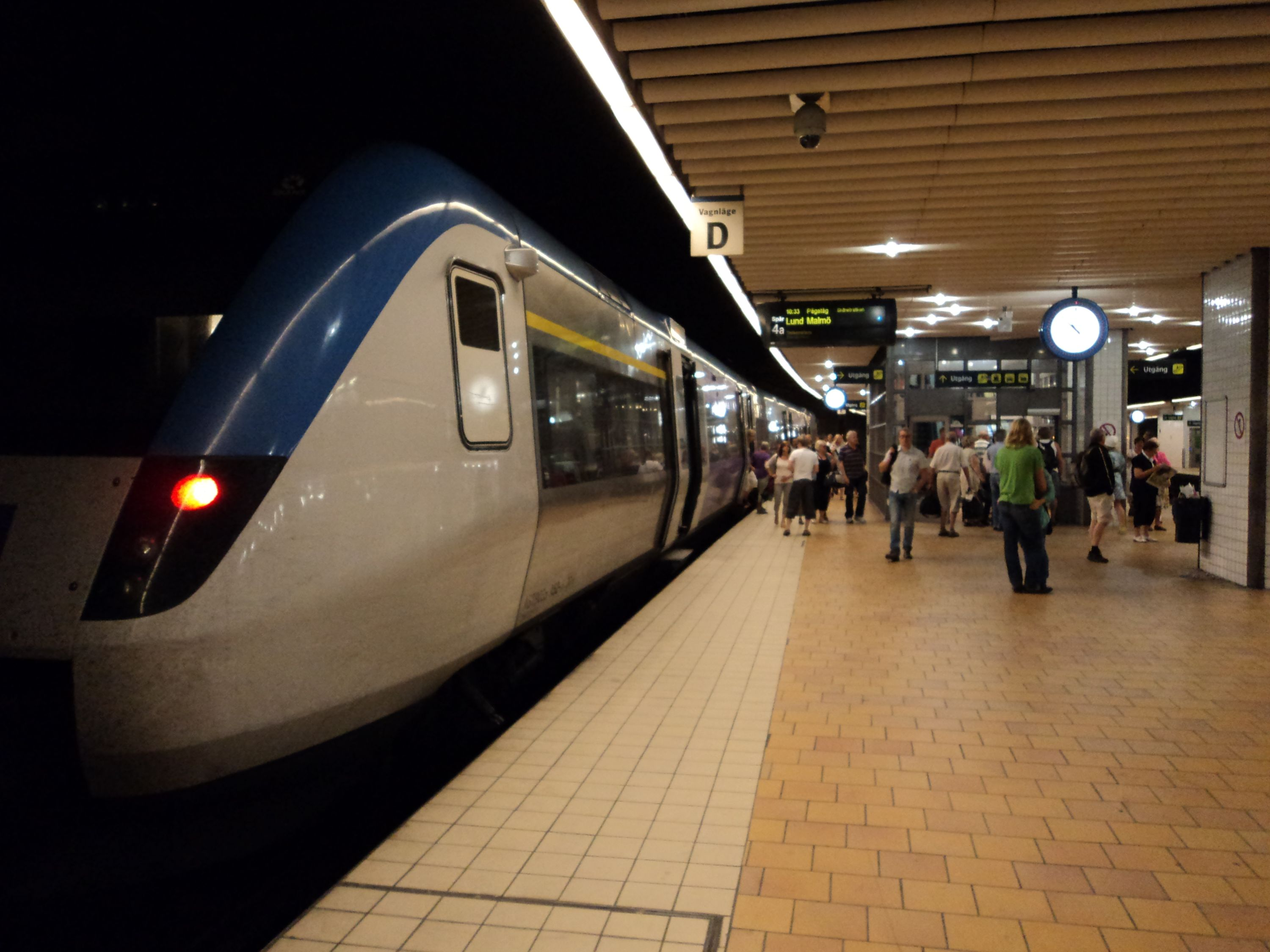
A substitute pågatåg awaits departure to Malmö via Teckomatorp.

Knutpunkten was built in 1984–1991 according to drawings by Ivar Krepp and is located where the old Central Station designed by Helgo Zettervall was located. With the construction of the Knutpunkten and the lowering of the tracks into the Helsingborg Tunnel, a major problem regarding the railway in Helsingborg was solved.

The property has changed owners several times in the mid-2000s. In 2005, Kungsleden AB sold the property to a fund managed by the Danish Keops A/S. In 2007, the property was acquired by a fund managed by British Lathe Investment, to be taken over by Nordic Land in 2008. On 13 October 2010, the building changed owners again, this time to Wihlborgs. On behalf of the new owner, the building has since been rebuilt in two stages, 2014–2016, with the establishment of five new levels of office space for business operations in the form of an office, and in 2019–2021 when the facade seen from the north, at the northern main entrance, changed appearance to a modern glass structure, and new areas for restaurant operations have been established inside this glass structure.

== History ==
The first railway in Helsingborg was opened in 1865 and went past Billeberga and Teckomatorp to Eslöv at the Southern Main Line. Its station came to be known as Helsingborg Central station, located just south of the traditional city, 200 meters south of Knutpunkten. In 1875 the railway from this station past Åstorp to Hässleholm was opened. In 1885 a railway line was opened to Ängelholm, which reached Gothenburg in 1892, and this year a station building was finished north of the city, and came to be known as Helsingborg Ferry station. This station was adjacent to the ferry terminal to Helsingør. For many years the ferry station was important primarily for long-distance traffic by train from Gothenburg and Stockholm, which also continued by ferry to Helsingør and then to Copenhagen. The Central station were mainly used for trains to Malmö. There was a track connection between these two stations, but it went on streets and trains had to go very slowly and only used to occasionally.
