= Landskrona railway station =

Railway station in Landskrona, Sweden

Landskrona
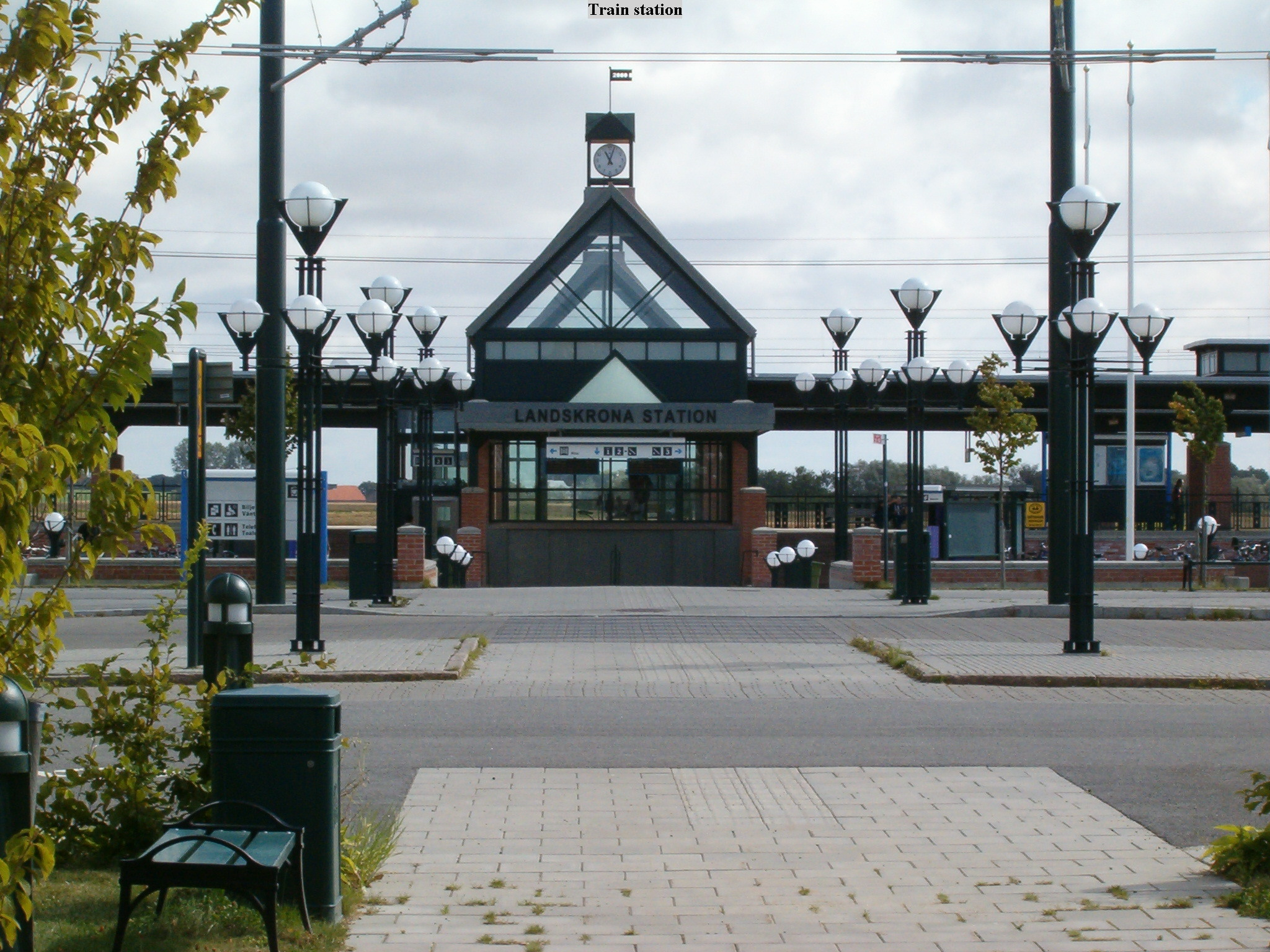
- Landskrona Station

General information
- Location: Landskrona, Landskrona Stad; Sweden
- Coordinates: 55°52′44.7″N 12°51′24.8″E
- Elevation: 10 m (33 ft) above sea level
- Operator: Trafikverket
- Line: West Coast Line
- Platforms: 2
- Tracks: 3
- Train operators: Skånetrafiken (Pågatågen); Oresundtrain

Construction
- Parking: Yes
- Cycle facilities: Yes
- Accessible: Yes

History
- Opened: 2001

Passengers
- 7 800 per weekday (2016)

Services
Preceding station	Øresundståg	Following station
Lund towards Østerport	Copenhagen–Gothenburg Øresundståg	Helsingborg towards Göteborg C
Preceding station	Pågatågen	Following station
Häljarp towards Hyllie	Line 2A	Glumslöv towards Helsingborg C
Location

Landskrona railway station is the railway station in Landskrona, Skåne County. It first opened in January 2001 and is a part of the West Coast Line.

== History ==
Prior to 2001 the former railway station in Landskrona was a terminal station located inside the city center. In connection with the expansion of Västkustbanan to double track, a new double-track railway was built between Kävlinge and Helsingborg, which ran outside Landskrona city center. The new station, called "Landskrona Östra", was built just outside the city center. The former station is now called "Landskrona freight rail yard" and is served only by freight trains.

In order for the residents of Landskrona to be able to get from the city's urban area to the new station, a new trolley bus line was inaugurated in September 2003. The trolley bus line connects to a travel center at Skeppsbrokajen, which was inaugurated in 2009.

=== Landskrona railway station 1865–2000 ===
The former station located in the city center was built by the Landskrona-Eslöv Railway Joint-stock Company in connection with the railway to Eslöv. The station building was designed by Claes Adelsköld and was inaugurated in 1865. The station is centrally located in Landskrona and since 2001 it has been operated solely by freight traffic.

== Traffic ==
The station is served by the local trains Pågatågen and the regional trains Oresundtrains. The local trains run with hourly traffic throughout the traffic day with reinforcement to half-hourly traffic during rush hour traffic. The Öresund trains run with hourly traffic throughout the day with an additional 2 trains per hour in rush hour traffic.

=== Bus station ===
Local traffic consists of five of Landskrona's city bus lines, of which No. 3 runs with trolley bus, the only one in Sweden. In addition to this, a number of regional buses also stop here. All bus stops are equipped with separate bus shelters, with associated roofs and benches.

The bus station is in the form of a U-shape and consists of 8 modes, of which modes A, B, C and D are used for city buses, and modes E, F, G and H are used for regional buses as well as long-distance buses and temporary replacement buses. The city bus stops are located across the outside of the station, accessible without having to cross the road, whereas the remaining stops for regional and long-distance services are located as boarding islands inside the shape of the station and accessing these requires passengers to cross the bus path.

== Layout ==
The station has two platforms, one side platform and one island platform. To get between the platforms there are stairs and two lifts.

=== Services ===
Ticket sales take place via Skånetrafiken's ticket machines next the platform for track 3. Since 2018, there is a waiting hall connected to the station with restrooms and information signs. Facing the waiting hall on the opposite side of entrance is Pressbyrån, the agent for Skånetrafiken cards and tickets.

== See also ==
- Rail transport in Sweden
