= SJ Öresund =

Swedish railway company

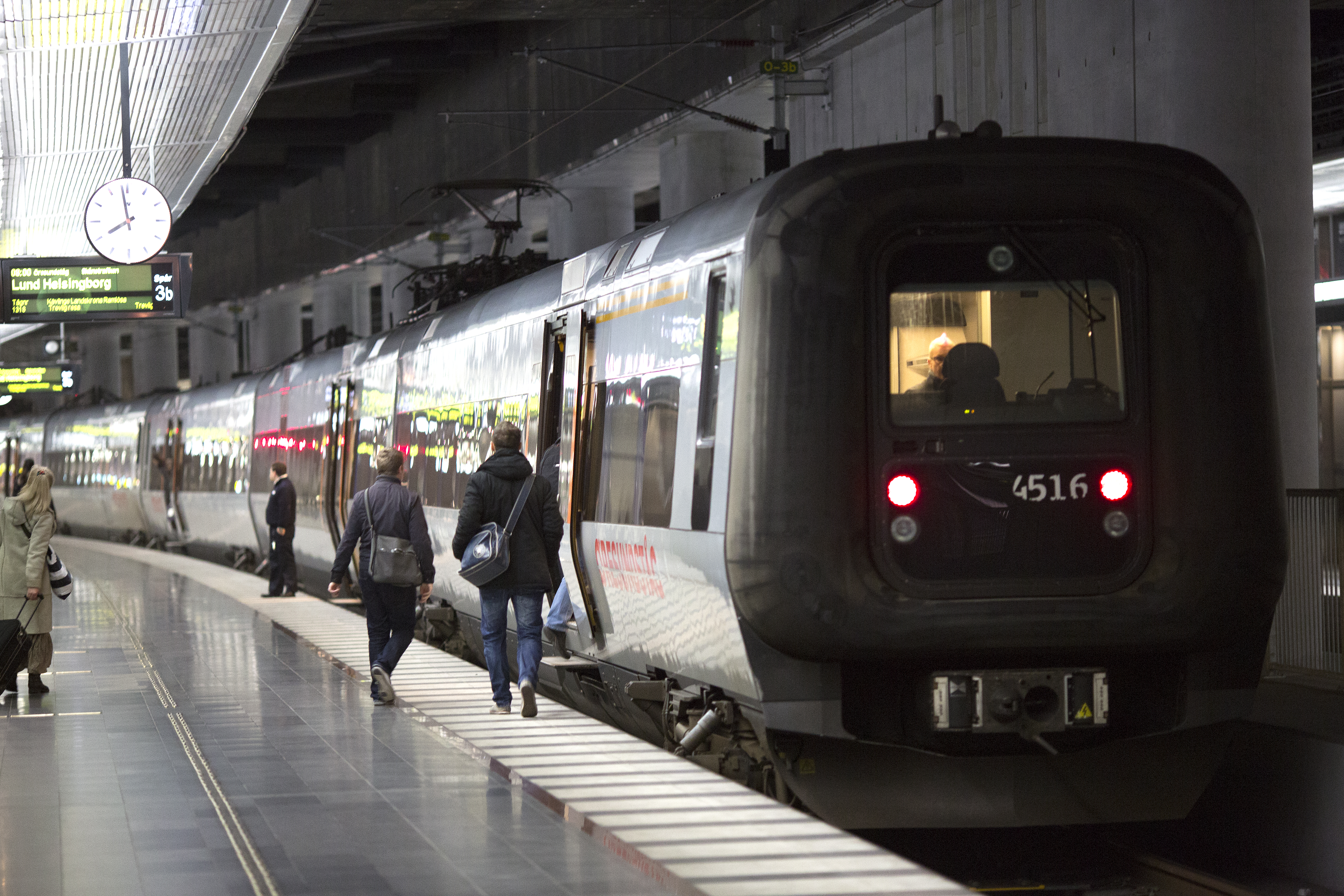
Øresundståg at Malmö Central Station

SJ Öresund was a division of SJ AB responsible for the operations of Øresundståg in Sweden. Øresundståg is a passenger train network in the transnational Øresund Region of Denmark and Sweden.

On 13 December 2020 SJ Öresund replaced the previous operator Transdev. In addition to operations, the company was responsible for the maintenance of the fleet of 77 Swedish owned Öresund trains at a depot in Hässleholm.

The agreement was for eight years but in April 2022 it was announced that SJ Öresund was going to terminate the contract in December 2022 due to issues regarding the maintenance of the trainsets.
