= Åstorp =

Locality in Sweden

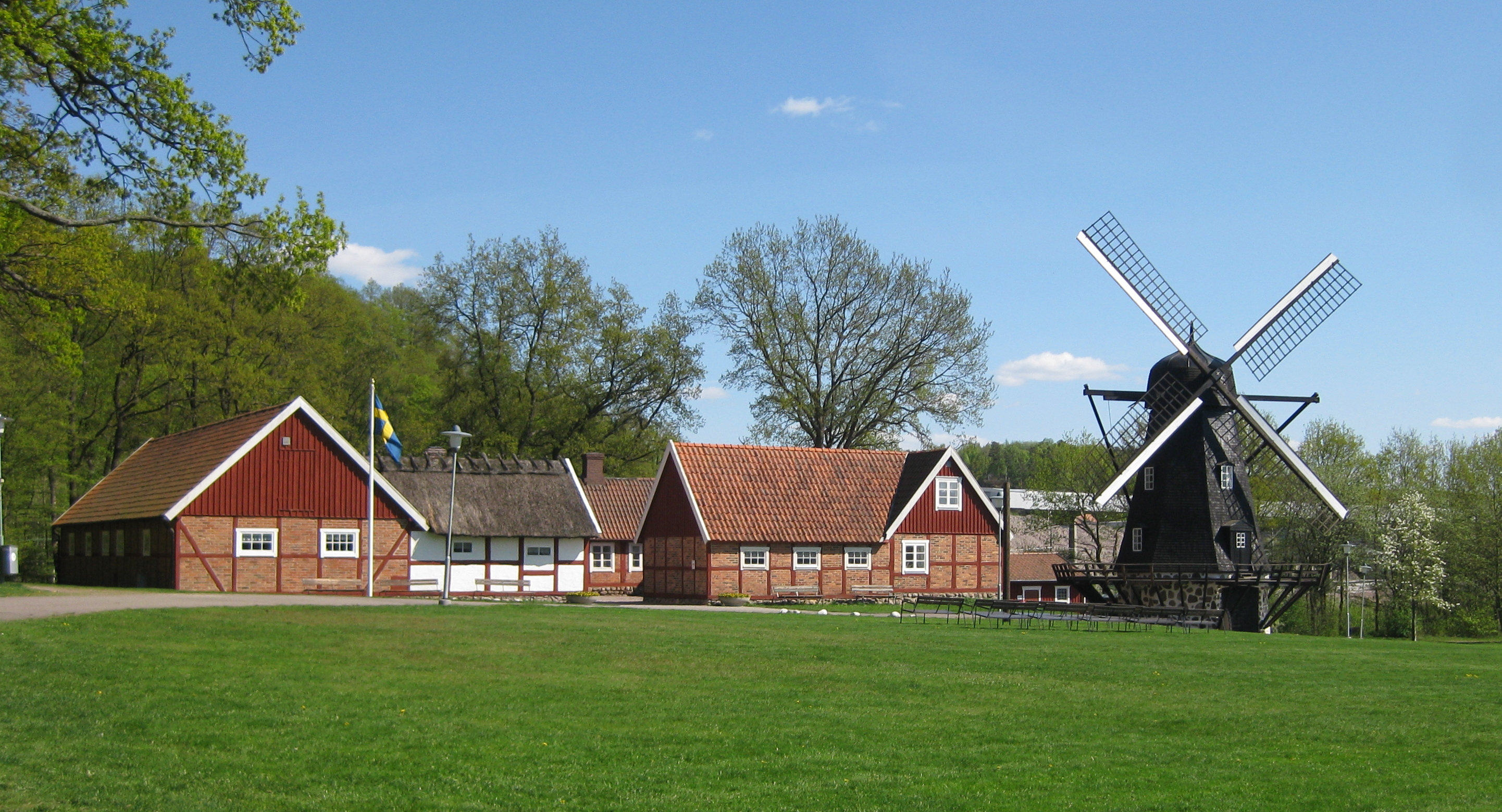
- Åstorp in April 2011

- Location within Scania Location within Sweden Location within European Union
- Coordinates: 56°8′5″N 12°56′50″E
- Country: Sweden
- Province: Scania
- County: Scania County
- Municipality: Åstorp Municipality and Ängelholm Municipality

Area
  - Total: 7.12 km^{2} (2.75 sq mi)

Population (31 December 2010)
  - Total: 9,488
  - Density: 1,332/km^{2} (3,450/sq mi)
- Time zone: UTC+1 (CET)
  - Summer (DST): UTC+2 (CEST)

Åstorp is a bimunicipal locality and the seat of Åstorp Municipality in Scania County, Sweden with 9,488 inhabitants in 2010. It is also partly located in Ängelholm Municipality.

== Overview ==
Åstorp is a railway junction located along the European route E4 close to Helsingborg. Åstorp Station is located 25 minutes by train from Helsingborg and 70 minutes from Kristianstad on the local line Helsingborg-Hässleholm-Kristianstad.

Åstorp grew in importance when the railway from Helsingborg to Hässleholm-Stockholm was completed in 1875. In 1886 a railway to Malmö was completed, and in 1888 Åstorp became a main junction when the Malmö-Gothenburg line was completed. These lines are still in use, although passenger traffic Malmö-Gothenburg is re-routed via Helsingborg-Ängelholm. The Ängelholm-Åstorp-Teckomatorp line is a main route for cargo trains to Malmö. Åstorp is connected to Helsingborg via two routes, one entering Helsingborg from the north and one from the south via Ramlösa.

Åstorp has also been connected with railroads to Landskrona, to Eslöv via Klippan, to Markaryd-Ljungby and to Höganäs-Mölle although traffic is discontinued and most of the tracks have been removed.
