= SJ X7 =

Swedish railcars

X7
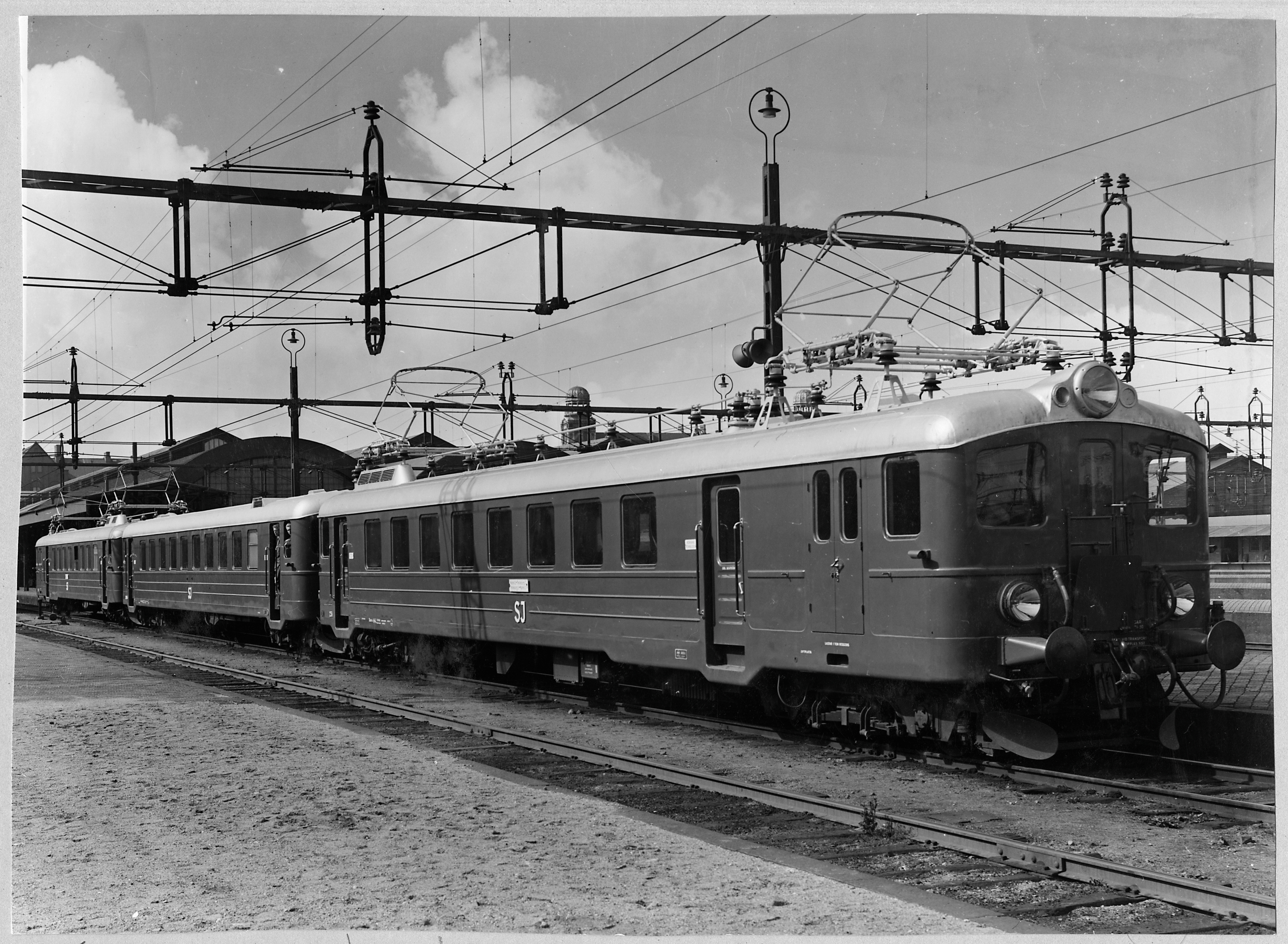
- In service: 1949 - 1983
- Manufacturer: ASEA
- Constructed: 1949-1951
- Number built: 26 (motor car); 22 (trailer)
- Fleet numbers: 222-244, 255-257
- Operator: Statens Järnvägar

Specifications
- Car length: 22,650 mm (74 ft 3.7 in) (motor car); 23,330 mm (76 ft 6.5 in) (trailer)
- Maximum speed: 90 km/h (56 mph)
- Weight: 47 t (46 long tons; 52 short tons) (motor cars); 32 t (31 long tons; 35 short tons) (trailer)
- Power output: 440 kW (590 hp)
- Electric system: 15 kV 16.7 Hz AC catenary
- Current collection: Pantograph
- Track gauge: 1,435 mm (4 ft 8 1/2 in)

X7 was a series of electric railcars operated by Statens Järnvägar (SJ) of Sweden as local trains. 26 motor cars were built, with an additional 22 trailers, by ASEA in 1949–1951. They were put into service on the predecessors to the Skåne and Gothenburg commuter rail systems. The X7 was in service until 1983, when it was replaced with X10.
