= Pågatågen =

Commuter railway in Skåne County, Sweden

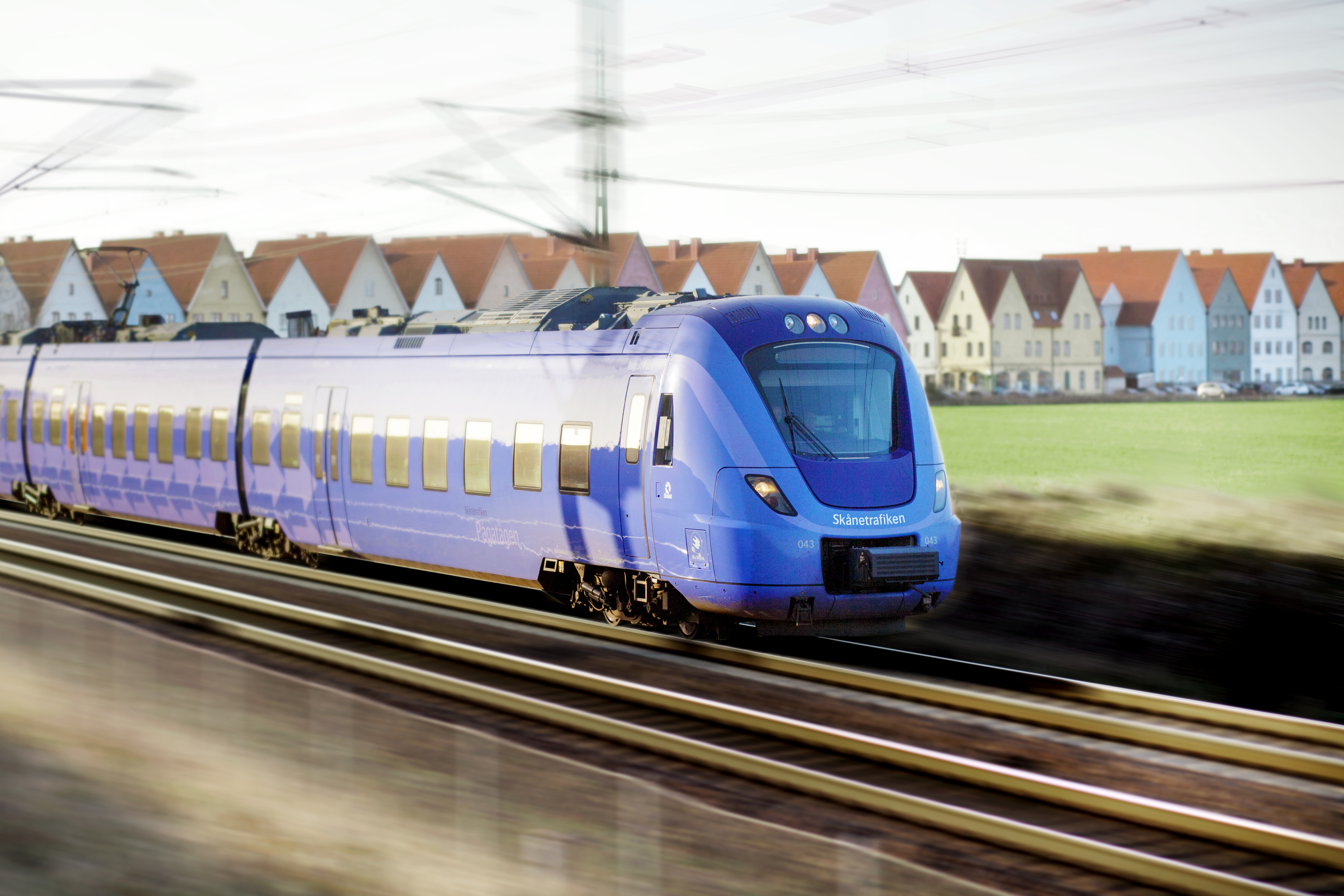

Overview
- Owner: Skånetrafiken
- Locale: Skåne County, Kronoberg County, Blekinge County, Halland County
- Transit type: Interurban commuter/regional rail
- Number of lines: 12
- Number of stations: 84

Operation
- Began operation: 9 January 1983
- Operator: VR Sverige under contract from Skånetrafiken
- Number of vehicles: 99 X61

Technical
- Track gauge: 1,435 mm (4 ft 8 1/2 in) standard gauge

Pågatågen is an interurban commuter and regional railway system in Skåne County, Sweden, and is owned by Skånetrafiken, the regional public transportation authority. The trains are operated by the contractor VR Sverige (owned by Finnish state operator VR Group). The network has 72 stations, of which 9 are in the Malmö Urban Area: Malmö C, Triangeln, Hyllie, Svågertorp, Persborg, Rosengård, Östervärn, Burlöv and Oxie and 6 in the Helsingborg Urban Area: Helsingborg C, Maria, Påarp, Ramlösa, Rydebäck and Ödåkra.

Påg is a dialectal Scanian word for 'boy', and is used to indicate that the trains are local/regional, and tåg is Swedish for train. The trains consist of purple-coloured electric multiple units of the X61 model. The trains are named after famous local people, either real or fictional.

== History ==
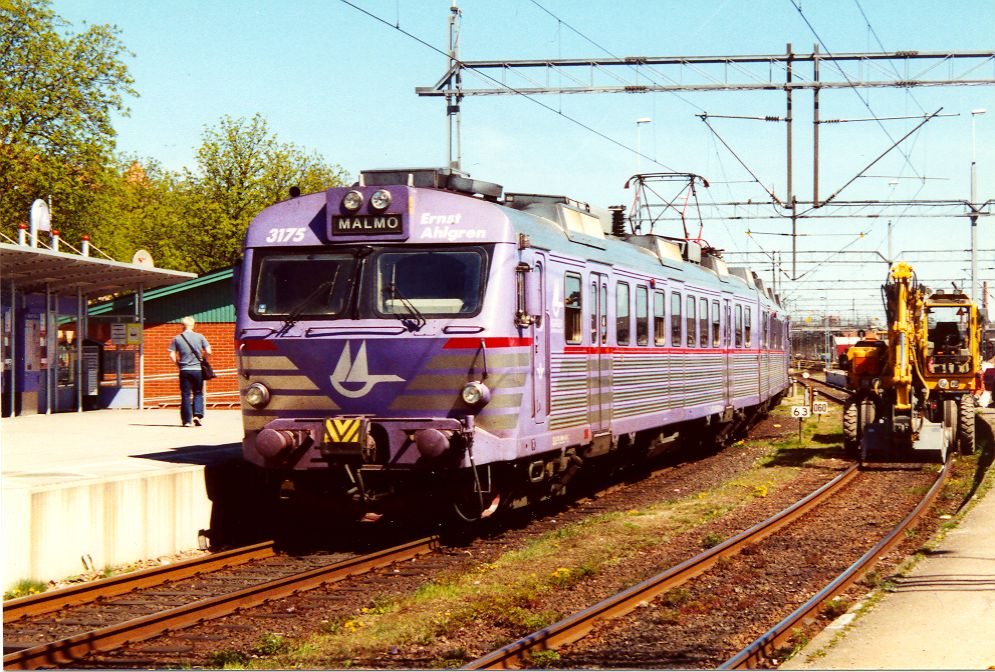
An X11 Pågatåg with the Länstrafiken Malmöhus logo at Ystad station in 2001

Local passenger rail traffic in Sweden had historically been provided by state operator SJ, but in the 1970s, opposition from director general Lars Petersson to Scanian local traffic and subsequent threats of line closures led to the formation of two local federations of Scanian municipalities (SSK and NSK) seeking to begin providing their own rail services.

Services were originally operated with X7 brown multiple units from the 1940s, and by 1983 trains from Malmö served Lund, Landskrona, Teckomatorp and Helsingborg. With the arrival of the new purple X11 units from ASEA, partly financed with a loan from PK-Banken, the name and brand Pågatågen took shape. A naming contest had been held by the local radio channel Radio Malmöhus, and a set of male names had been chosen for the series, with the trains also gaining the name 'Pågatågen' due to this fact. The first Pågatåg, an X11 EMU named Bombi Bitt (named after the character written by Fritiof Nilsson Piraten), entered service at Malmö Central Station on 9 January 1983.

In 1988 responsibility for Pågatågen was transferred to Malmöhus County, as the expansion of services meant that Pågatågen had outgrown the abilities of SSK and NSK. With the merger of Malmöhus and Kristianstad counties into Skåne County responsibility was again transferred to Skånetrafiken, and services were extended into what was Kristianstad County, with services to Helsingborg extended to Ängelholm in 1999, services to Ystad extended to Tomelilla and Simrishamn in 2003 and services to Hässleholm and Kristianstad itself starting in 2007.

As the new train sets of the X61 class were being planned, names of women were to be used for the trains for the first time. These trains were playfully called 'Tösatåg' by both Skånetrafiken and the press, 'tös' meaning 'girl' in the Scanian dialect, and a full-scale prototype was exhibited at Malmö Central Station from 9 to 13 January 2008. In December 2009, the first of the new X61 train sets, 'Birgit Nilsson', entered service at Malmö Central Station. The last service using the old model X11 was run on 8 September 2013.

All Pågatågen services were shifted to the newly built City Tunnel between 2010 and 2011. In December 2015, the largest expansion in Pågatågen's history was implemented with the opening of the Hallandsås Tunnel and two new stations at Förslöv and Barkåkra, as well as the re-introduction of passenger rail services to Trelleborg after an absence of over 40 years. In December 2018, some services originating from points north of Malmö Central Station began to be extended in a balloon loop-shaped route through the City Tunnel and onto the Continental Line running through the inner-city of Malmö (line 11), serving two newly built stations at Persborg and Rosengård. The Pågatågen celebrated its 40th anniversary on 9 January 2023.

== Lines ==
The Pågatågen network as of December 2021, with current lines in purple and future lines in light purple. Dashed lines are only operated during rush hours.

As of October 2025, there are eleven lines in the Pågatågen system. There are stops in three neighbouring counties: three stops in Blekinge County, two stops in Halland County and one stop in Kronoberg County.

Line	Route	No. of stops
2	Halmstad – Förslöv – Ängelholm – Helsingborg C – Ramlösa – Landskrona – Kävlinge – Lund – Malmö C – Hyllie	26
3	Helsingborg C – Teckomatorp – Eslöv – Lund C – Burlöv – Malmö C – Hyllie	14
4A	Älmhult – Hässleholm – Höör – Eslöv – Lund C – Malmö C – Hyllie	17
4B	Karlshamn – Kristianstad – Hässleholm – Höör – Eslöv – Lund C – Malmö C – Hyllie	24
5	Helsingborg C – Ramlösa – Åstorp – Hässleholm – Kristianstad	14
6	Lund C – Malmö C – Hyllie – Ystad – Simrishamn	20
7	Markaryd – Hässleholm	4
8	Åstorp – Teckomatorp – Kävlinge – Lund C – Malmö C – Hyllie	12
9	Lund – Malmö C – Hyllie – Trelleborg	12
10	Växjö – Alvesta – Osby – Hässleholm	11
11	Kävlinge – Lomma – Malmö C – Triangeln – Hyllie – Persborg – Rosengård – Malmö C	10

In addition, rush-hour-only line 12 provides an extra hourly service from Malmö Central Station to Åstorp, with some services continuing to Helsingborg Central Station. Local trains from neighbouring Småland also operate within Scania on the route Växjö–Älmhult–Hässleholm.

== Rolling stock ==
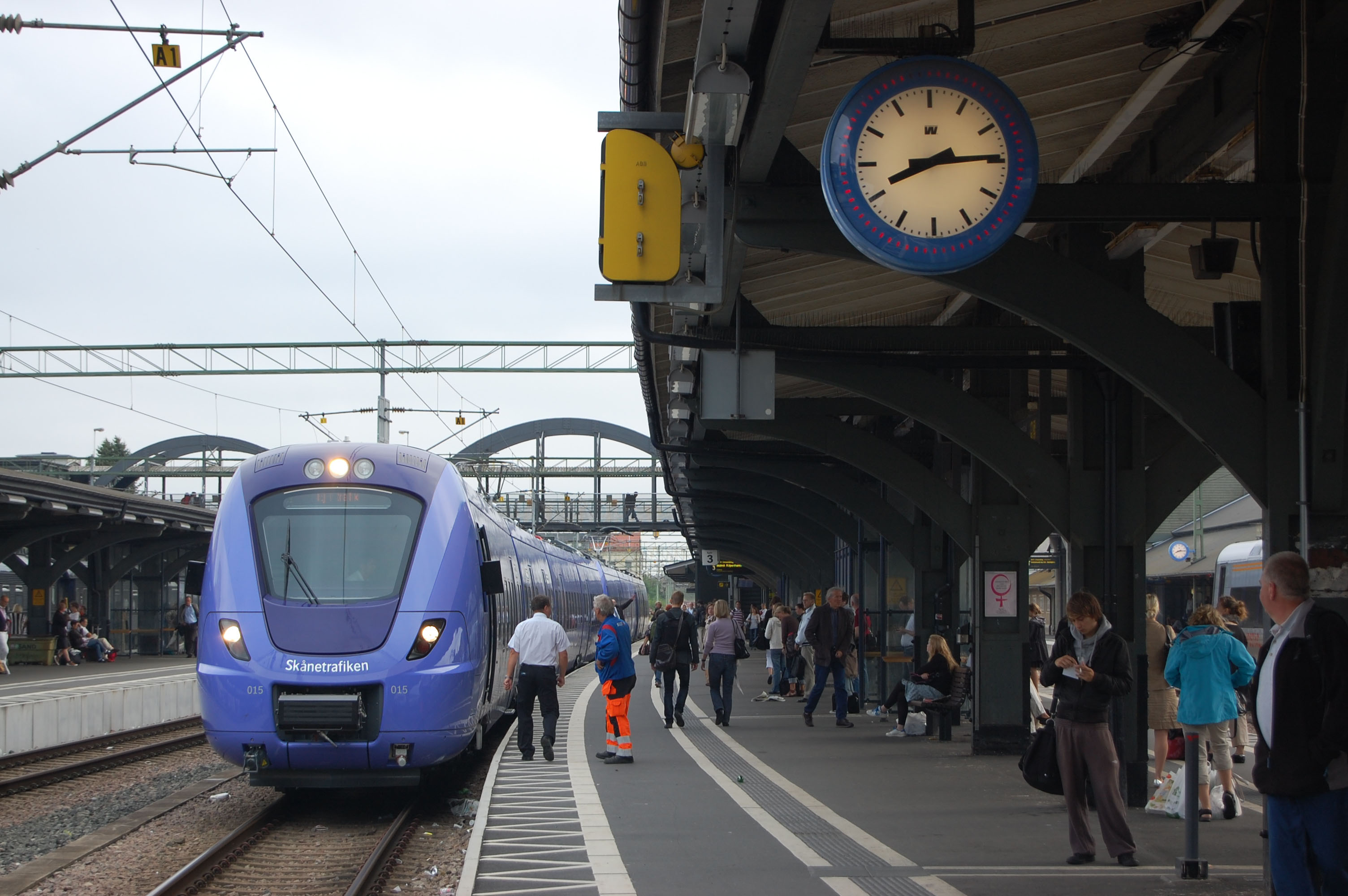
A Pågatåg at Lund Central Station. Every train set is named after a Scanian person of significance, either real or fictional. The older trains are of the type X11 and the newer trains are of the type X61 (as shown here), both in a purple livery.

The Pågatåg rolling stock is owned by Skånetrafiken, although the operation (staff and licences etc.) is carried out by the Swedish subsidiary of VR Group (formerly Arriva plc).

Pågatåg rolling stock under the first concession (1983–1997) were primarily of type X11 (with diesel Y1 railcars used on the then-non-electrified Malmö-Ystad line from 1990 to 1996), but as demand grew, other available train types had to be added to the roster. Some Bombardier Regina X52 type trainsets were rented from other train owners. The type X31K, normally used for the Øresundståg traffic to Denmark, was also used sometimes. Subsequently, Skånetrafiken ordered 99 new Alstom Coradia X61 sets, a variant of the type used in Stockholm. Several of them have been used on revenue services since August 2010, and since 2013 they have taken over all services. Skånetrafiken attempted to sell most of the X11 trains during 2011, since they can no longer be used; they do not fulfil all the safety requirements for the City Tunnel in Malmö and had only a temporary exception from the rules, which also required extra staff. Ten of these X61 units were also rented out to Västtrafik, when they were experiencing a shortage of rolling stock while waiting on the new X80 trains which started service in May 2026.The borrowed trains have now been handed back to Region Skåne.

Note that the rolling stock for the Øresundståg, outside of the Pågatåg concession, is of Class X31K only, and these trains are owned by six southern regions in Sweden; Blekinge, Halland, Kronoberg, Skåne, Kalmar County and Västtrafik

== Tickets ==
For the Pågatågen trains as well as the Øresundståg, paper tickets or passes can be used but tickets bought on a mobile phone using Skånetrafiken's mobile app are also valid. The paper tickets can be bought from machines at the stations. This is in contrast to buses where electronic contactless smartcards are used. The reason for the difference is that half of the Øresundståg rolling stock is owned by Danish DSB which does not want to install Swedish ticket machines.

== See also ==
- Öresund Trains
- History of rail transport in Sweden
- Rail transport in Sweden
