= Ramlösa =

Swedish mineral water brand

Coordinates: 56°01′18″N 12°44′35″E

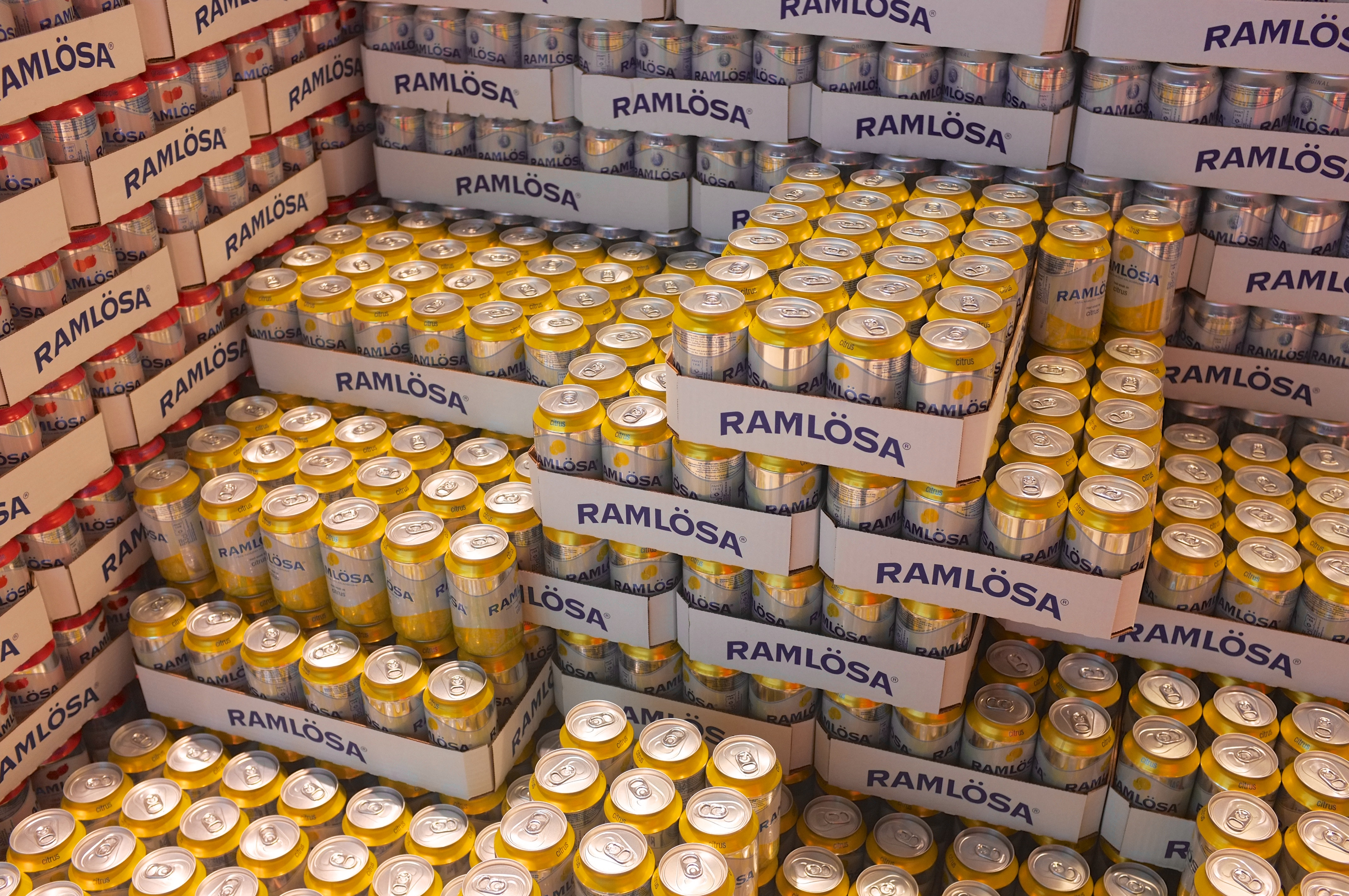
Different varieties of Ramlösa mineral water sold in Sweden

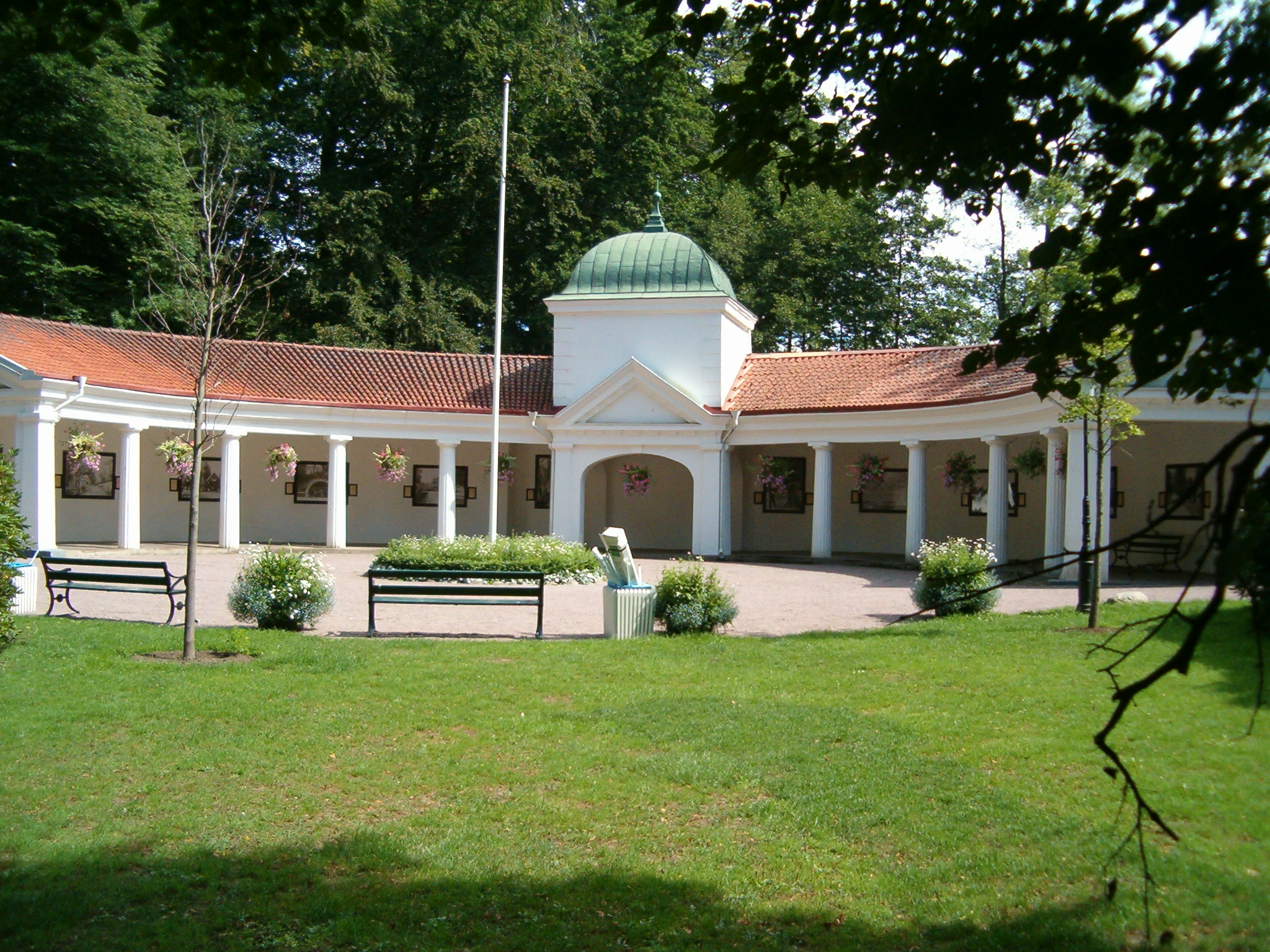
The Spa Pavilion at the Ramlösa mineral water spring in Helsingborg, Sweden

Ramlösa (Swedish pronunciation: [ˈrâmːˌløːsa]) is a brand of carbonated mineral water from a source in Ramlösa Brunnspark in the southern part of Helsingborg, Sweden. Ramlösa goes back to the year 1707 when a mineral spa around the source was founded by Johan Jacob Döbelius.

Ramlösa is very common in northern Europe and is considered high-quality mineral water. Ramlösa is also popular outside Scandinavia and the water is exported as far as the United States, Middle East, Asia, Australia, and New Zealand.

Ramlösa is today a wholly owned subsidiary of the Danish brewery group Carlsberg.

Swedish commercials for Ramlösa previously had voice-overs by actor Stellan Skarsgård.

== In popular culture ==
=== Books ===
- American Psycho, Patrick Bateman, the novel’s main character, rates Ramlösa as "very good".
- The Girl Who Kicked the Hornet's Nest, the character Mikael Blomkvist requests the product as a favored drink.

=== Film ===
- Ocean's Eleven (2001) shows the beverage several times in its blue waterdrop export bottle.
- The Player (1992), Tim Robbins's character declines a martini in favor of a glass of Ramlösa.

=== Music ===
- "Socker", a song by the Swedish band Kent, includes a biblical reference: "and Ramlösa becomes wine".

=== Television ===
- The Sopranos, season 2, episode 10, "Bust Out", mentions the beverage several times. Artie Bucco mentions he got “such a deal” on the Ramlösa.
- Designing Women, season 6, episode 1, "The Big Desk, Part 1", the beverage is referenced by Julia Duffy's character, Allison Sugarbaker.
