= Teckomatorp =

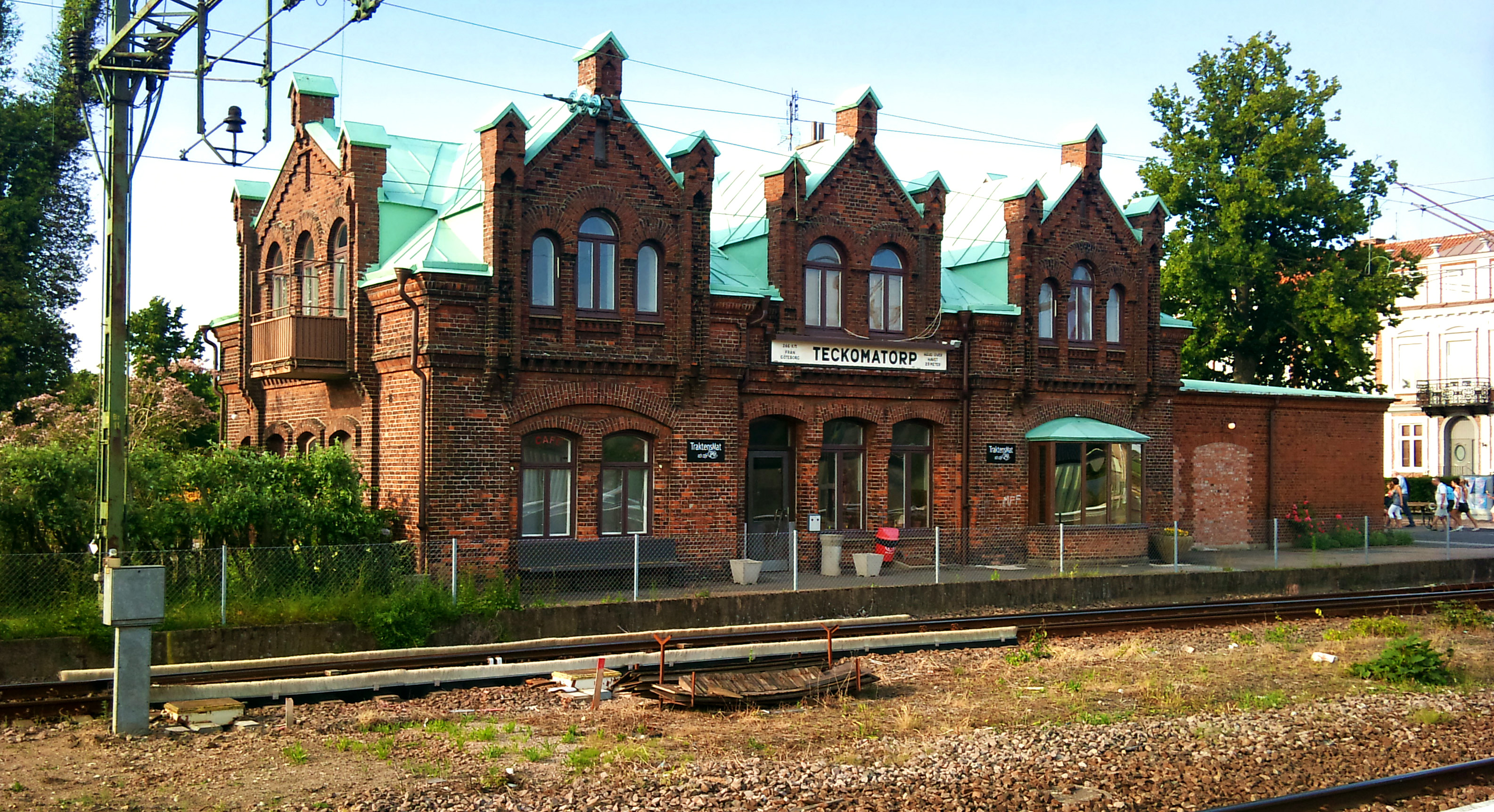
- Teckomatorp railway station

- Location within Skåne Location within Sweden
- Coordinates: 55°52′N 13°05′E
- Country: Sweden
- Province: Skåne
- County: Skåne County
- Municipality: Svalöv Municipality

Area
  - Total: 1.22 km^{2} (0.47 sq mi)

Population (31 December 2010)
  - Total: 1,651
  - Density: 1,354/km^{2} (3,510/sq mi)
- Time zone: UTC+1 (CET)
  - Summer (DST): UTC+2 (CEST)

Teckomatorp (Swedish pronunciation: [ˈtɛ̂kːɔmaˌtɔrp]) is a locality situated in Svalöv Municipality, Skåne County, Sweden with 1,651 inhabitants in 2010. It has a railway station (local pågatåg trains) on the Malmö–Teckomatorp–Helsingborg railway line.

== BT Kemi scandal ==
Teckomatorp is the site of one of the largest toxic spills in Sweden. The company BT Kemi produced pesticides. During the 1970s, the inhabitants of Teckomatorp started complaining of an acrid odour from the plant that made people ill. It was also said that BT Kemi had buried barrels of toxic waste in the ground. However, the authorities did nothing for several years, despite efforts of campaigners such as Monica Nilsson, a resident of Teckomatorp, who conducted a signature campaign among the citizens. The government took steps to investigate the issue only after a former employee of BT Kemi told a newspaper that the company was entering forged values within allowed limits into its emission journals. When the authorities finally started to dig, several hundreds of barrels with toxic contents were found.

In 1979 the plant was demolished, and in 1980 the southern area around the plant itself was cleaned. Later it was discovered that the northern area of the town was also polluted, and that the southern area remained polluted despite cleanup efforts. In 2009 a project to restore nature was completed: tons of contaminated topsoil were removed, and a natural park has been established on the site of poisoned area.
