= Kävlinge =

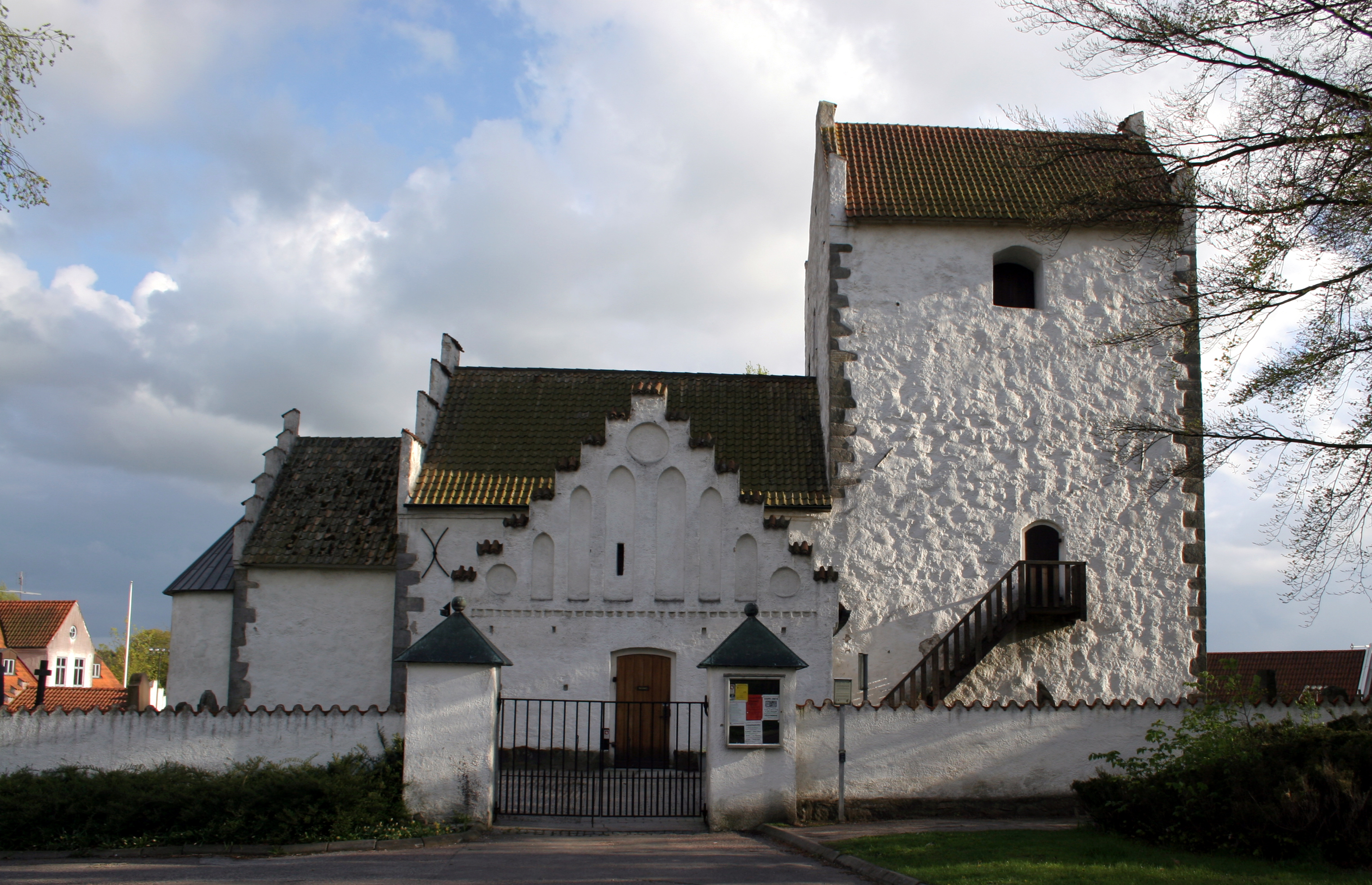
- Kävlinge Church

- Coat of arms

- Location within Skåne Location within Sweden
- Coordinates: 55°47′38″N 13°06′48″E
- Country: Sweden
- Province: Skåne
- County: Skåne County
- Municipality: Kävlinge Municipality

Area
  - Total: 4.68 km^{2} (1.81 sq mi)

Population (31 December 2021)
  - Total: 32,341
- Time zone: UTC+1 (CET)
  - Summer (DST): UTC+2 (CEST)

Kävlinge (Swedish pronunciation: [ˈɕɛ̂ːvlɪŋɛ]) is a locality and the seat of Kävlinge Municipality, Skåne County, Sweden with 32,341 inhabitants in 2021.

In 1996, a train containing large amounts of ammonia derailed and around 9,000 people had to be evacuated from the area. This was the biggest evacuation operation in Swedish history.

Near Kävlinge is the site of the Hög passage grave, a Bronze Age barrow covering a Neolithic burial chamber. Hög means mound from the Old Norse word haugr for hill. The finds from the excavations are in the Lund University Historic Museum.

== Battle of Lund ==
Kävlinge is located north of Lund and has a river passing through called Kävlingeån (translated Kävlinge River). The river played an important role at the events leading up to the Battle of Lund, during the Scanian War.
