= Skånetrafiken =

Public transport provider in Skåne, Sweden

- Type: Regional department
- Industry: Public transit
- Predecessors: Länstrafiken Malmöhus, Länstrafiken Kristianstad
- Founded: January 1, 1999; 27 years ago
- Headquarters: Hässleholm, Sweden
- Area served: Scania
- Number of employees: 420 (2019)
- Website: www.skanetrafiken.se

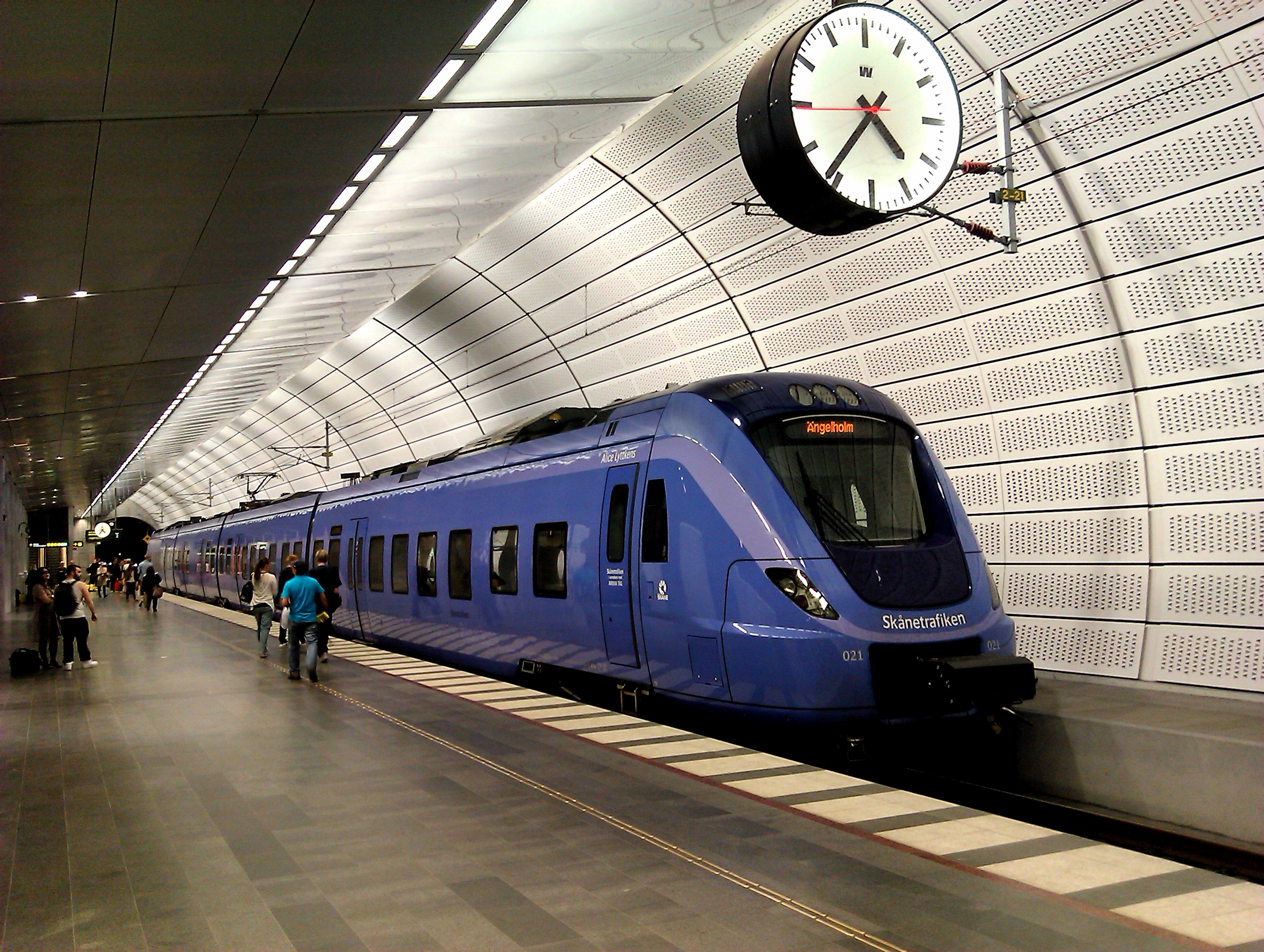
Pågatåg in Triangeln station, Malmö

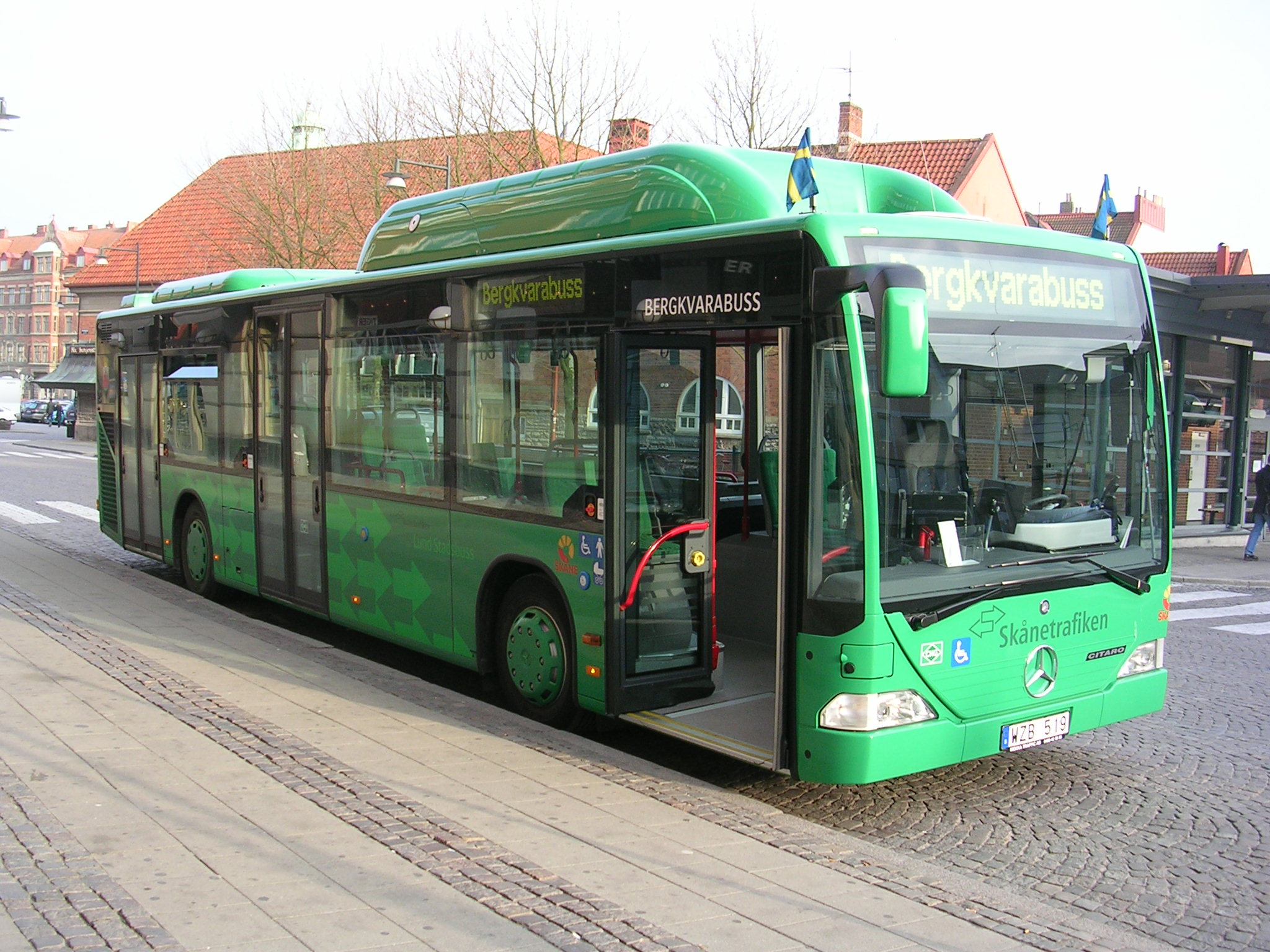
Skånetrafiken bus in Lund.

Skånetrafiken (lit. 'The Scania Traffic') is the regional organisation responsible for managing public transport in Skåne County, southern Sweden.

Skånetrafiken was founded in 1999 when the two Scanian counties of Kristianstads län and Malmöhus län were merged into one region, causing the two respective transport authorities for each previous county to be amalgamated. Presently, Skånetrafiken is a part of the regional government of Region Skåne.

The main office is located in Hässleholm with a second office in Lund. The managing director of Skånetrafiken is Magnus Hedin.

== Public transport services ==
Skånetrafiken organise train services on several lines within Scania, called Pågatåg, which are currently delivered under contract by VR (former Arriva). These are supplemented by the Öresundståg, regional train services managed by Skånetrafiken and other local transport authorities, which cross into Denmark and neighbouring counties in Sweden. The Öresundståg network in both Denmark and Sweden. On the 14th of December VR Sverige took over the operation and maintenance of the Öresundståg from Transdev. Before the 11th of December 2022, the Öresundståg was operated by DSB and SJ Öresund in cooperation.

City bus services are available in 10 cities and towns in Scania with the majority of services in Malmö, Helsingborg and Lund. Regional bus routes that connect cities and town operate throughout Scania.

Depending on the results of the bidding process, different bus companies are awarded contracts for bus lines. The principal bus companies running bus services for Skånetrafiken are Veolia Transport, Arriva, Nobina, VR, and Bergkvarabuss.

Some services for transportation of handicapped people are also run by Skånetrafiken under the name of Serviceresor.

Some train and bus services between Scania and the adjoining counties of Blekinge, Halland and Kronoberg are organised in conjunction with corresponding regional transit authorities in the respective counties.

Skånetrafiken is also the brand used for the Lund tramway.

== Tickets, prices and ticketing system ==
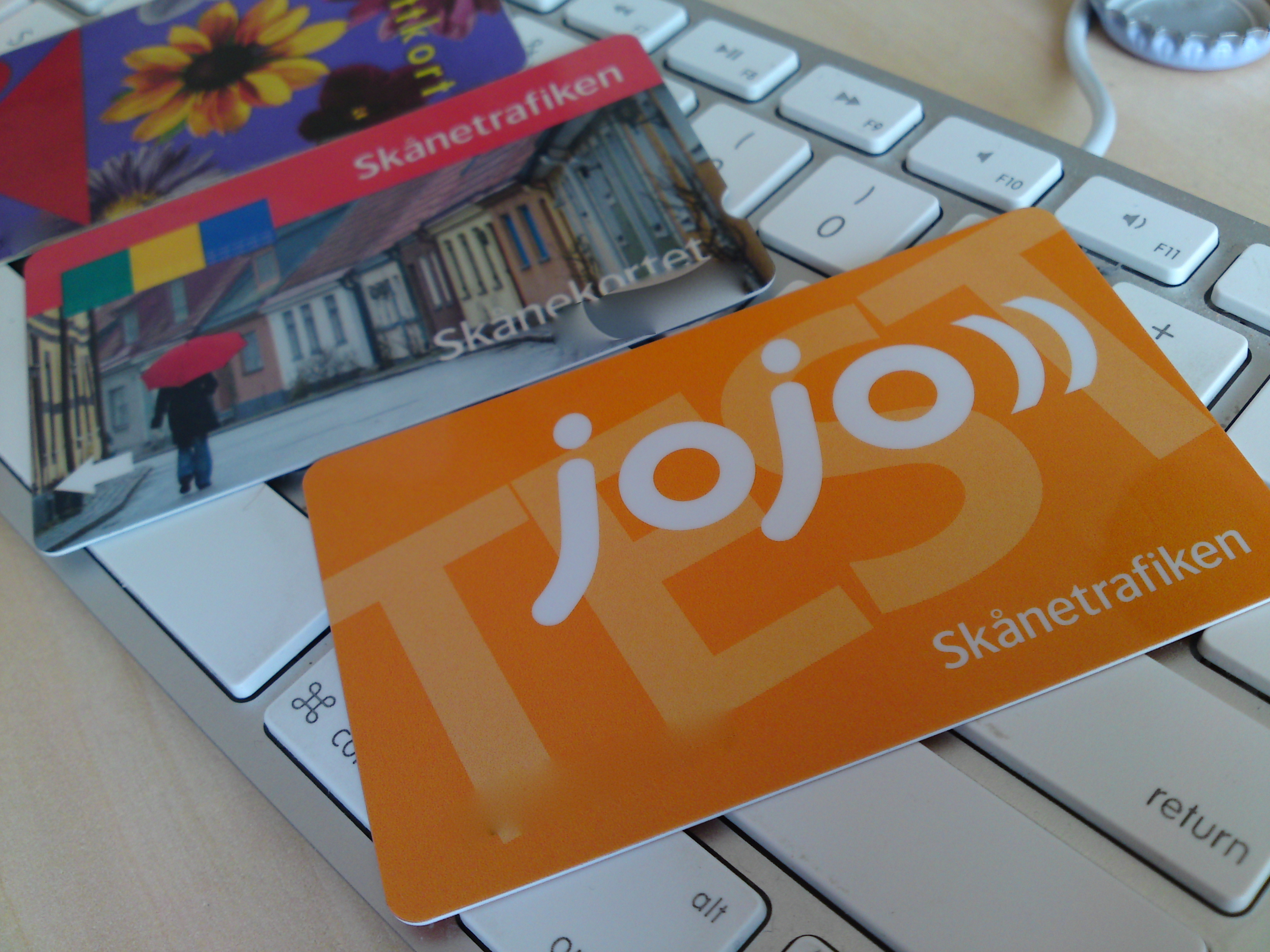
Various Skånetrafiken payment cards. From left: Malmöhus Läns stadstrafik rabattkort, Skånetrafiken periodkort, (defunct) Skånetrafiken jojo test card

Since Skånetrafiken manages all public transport in Scania, tickets are valid on all local trains and buses. Furthermore, a passenger can buy a ticket on an urban bus in one city for a combined ride by bus – train – bus to a final destination in another city. This ease of ticketing may have been a contributing factor to the positive development in patronage since the inception of Skånetrafiken in 1999.

Within the city bus systems tickets are sold at a fixed price for the entire city. (Tickets are sold for one Adult so not for a whole family, just for the person that pays). For journeys which fall outside these zones pricing is based on the distance of the journey, with prices increasing along with the distance.

Tickets can be purchased as single or all-day journeys, or in different forms of pre-paid passes. All tickets are sold within the app. City buses accept tap-to-pay debit and credit cards. The only thing is that you only could buy an adult ticket in the City for 1 hour or 24 hour. If you stamp your card one more time it would cost as two journeys. On trains and regional buses, passengers must buy a ticket before boarding from machines if there are a machines at your stop (Train stations often have ticket machines but they are rare at regional bus stops. Mostly in Helsingborg you could find ticket machines) on or near the platform or within the Skånetrafiken app. Those with a fixed-term ticket can board the train directly.

For those who do not wish to buy single-journey tickets and who cannot use the app Skånetrafiken also provides a contactless travel card. The travel card can be filled with tickets (only one type) at Skånetrafiken Customer Centres, online on the Skånetrafiken webpage, at an affiliated organization or at a ticket machine.

For travel to and from Denmark, tickets can be purchased directly with Skånetrafiken, either within the app or on the travel card. Fares that include a border crossing will include unlimited use of local public transit on each side and if you want to you could add Zones in Denmark so you could travel on bigger area. For example if you want to go over to Copenhagen city you buy for zone F+L (1+3+4). But if you want to go to Roskilde you buy zone ABCH. (There you have a more old zone system than the rest of Skånetrafikens Zonesystem called Öresundtaxan). Within the validity period of the ticket (a paper receipt needs to be printed if using a Skånetrafiken travel card as the card is incompatible with the Danish Rejsekort system; app users can just show the electronic ticket when boarding buses and if asked while on trains but you should always keep your ticket if they will look at your ticket more than ones time).

When wanting to go with Krösa-, Påga- or Öresundståg out from Scania (Sydtaxan) the ticket is valid for the destination city zone with other public traffic Hallands Länstrafik, Västtrafik, Blekingetrafiken, Kronobergs Länstrafik and Kalmars länstrafik. For example a ticket to Gothenburg/(Göteborg) Central station is valid to any Västtrafik tram or bus stop inside Gothenburg.

== Criticism ==
The entire ticketing system in Scania was switched in 2009 when the debit card and 30-day commuter cards have been merged into a common smart card system. Originally, this conversion was planned to be operational by 2007.

Skånetrafiken has been criticised, particularly in 2007, for not being sufficiently quick and decisive in response to increases in patronage. The success of some routes had been so good that overcrowding plagued some train and bus services for months. This yielded no response on the part of Skånetrafiken; and had been particularly the case for rush-hour train service to and from Denmark. There was more criticism during 2009/2010 for crowding in the Malmö station which was being rebuilt. Skånetrafiken claimed to have made changes in internal decision procedures to catch these problems more quickly in the future. The Malmö Central station had no room for more trains until a new tunnel was opened in the winter 2010–2011. It was not a possibility to rent or buy trains for the traffic to Denmark, since rail authorities in both countries have many special requirements, meaning custom made trains must be bought.

== Colour scheme ==
Skånetrafiken uses different colours on their buses and trains to represent the different means of transport.

- Green - City buses that mostly stay inside one town/city. For example Malmö's City buses.
- Yellow - Regional and Express buses.
- Purple - Pågatågen: Interurban commuter and regional railway.
- Grey - Öresundståg: A cross-border regional passenger train network linking Denmark and Sweden connecting Copenhagen with Malmö and forming a wider regional rail system serving southern Sweden, with services extending as far as Gothenburg and Kalmar.
- Red - Timetables and other publications.
- Blue - SkåneFlex: A rural bus service that requires booking in advance.
