= Hässleholm =

Place in Scania, Sweden

Hässleholm, Sweden
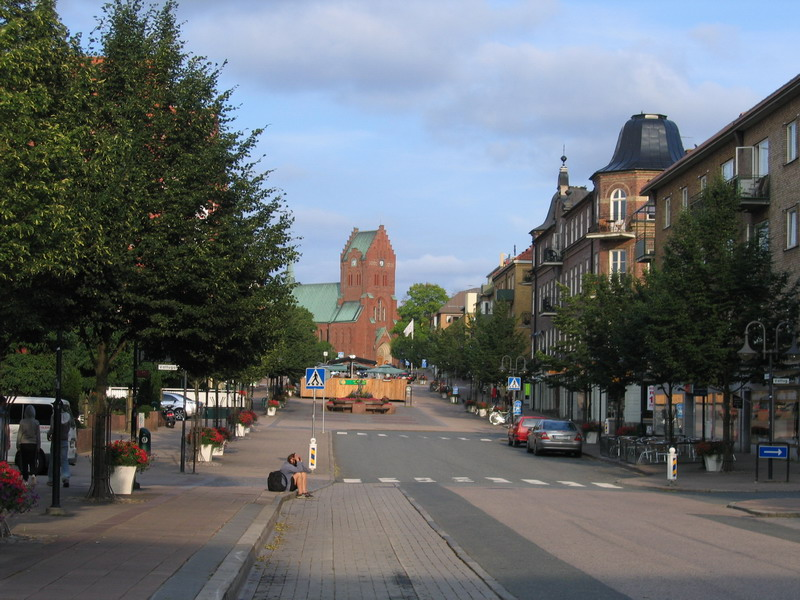
- Central Hässleholm

- Coat of arms

- Location within Skåne Location within Sweden Location within European Union
- Coordinates: 56°10′N 13°46′E
- Country: Sweden
- Province: Scania
- County: Scania County
- Municipality: Hässleholm Municipality
- Charter: 1205

Area
  - Total: 12.03 km^{2} (4.64 sq mi)

Population (31 December 2021)
  - Total: 18,500
  - Density: 1/km^{2} (2.6/sq mi)
- Time zone: UTC+1 (CET)
  - Summer (DST): UTC+2 (CEST)

Hässleholm is a locality and the seat of Hässleholm Municipality, Scania County, Sweden with 18,500 inhabitants in 2011.

== Overview ==
Hässleholm was gradually developed from 1860 in connection with the construction of the main Stockholm-to-Malmö railway line. There was no settlement on the spot before the arrival of the railway. The station got its name from a manor situated in the vicinity of a planned railway junction. It gained the city title in 1914 and was then classified as one of Sweden's smallest cities. During the 20th century, it developed into a military hub. After the end of the Cold War, most of the military establishments were disbanded or moved to other locations.

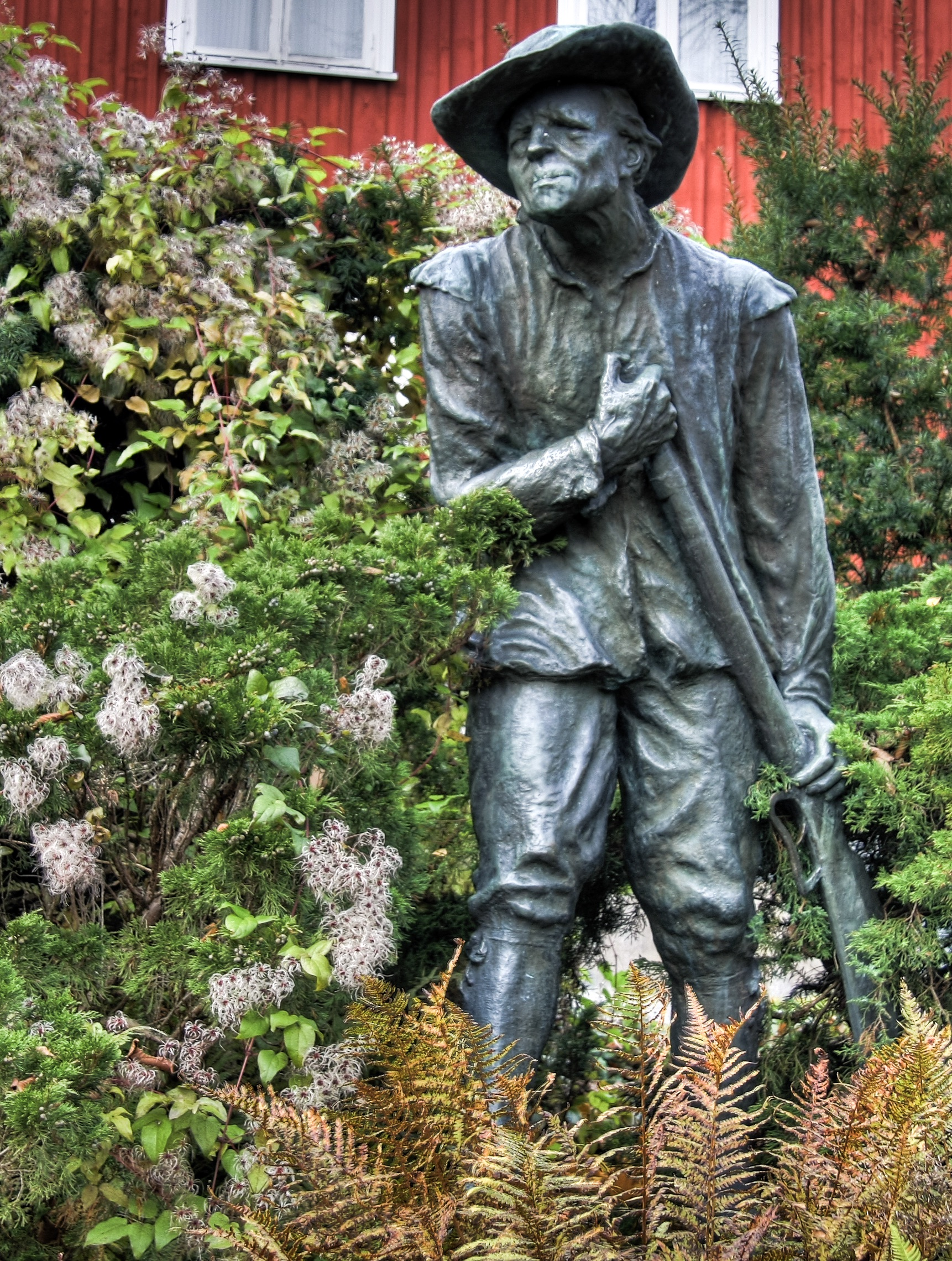
Lille Mads Snapphanen from 1934 in the Hembygdsparken park

In 2000, Hässleholm's Cultural Center ("kulturhus") was opened. It features theatres, a library, a visitors center, and restaurants. East of the town center is the hometown park ("hembygdspark") with a statue called "Snapphanen", by the sculptor Axel Ebbe. The statue reminds of the area's history as a center for Scanian insurgents during the 17th-century struggles between Sweden and Denmark.

Some of the town's most distinctive architecture is located along First Avenue ("Första avenyn"). The Central Train Station is at the west end of the street, in the very heart of the town. Hässleholm's church (built in 1914) lies at the east end of the street. Hotell Statt, the main and oldest hotel, is located on the north side, and on the south side is the town's oldest building, which now holds stores, offices, and apartments.

The Swedish representative for the 2013 Eurovision Song Contest, Robin Stjernberg, was born in Hässleholm in 1991.

In 2023, Hässleholm businessman Oddvar Lönnerkrantz told news site Frilagt that Sweden Democrat mayor, Hanna Nilsson had tried to hire him to force a local resident to drop his appeal of the city council's purchase of a building for an elderly care home. As a result of these accusations, the Moderate Party and Christian Democrats pulled out of Hässleholm's coalition government, and called on Nilsson to resign.

== Sports ==
The local sports clubs are:

- Hässleholms IF
- IFK Hässleholm
