= Platform screen doors =

Doors separating rail platforms from tracks

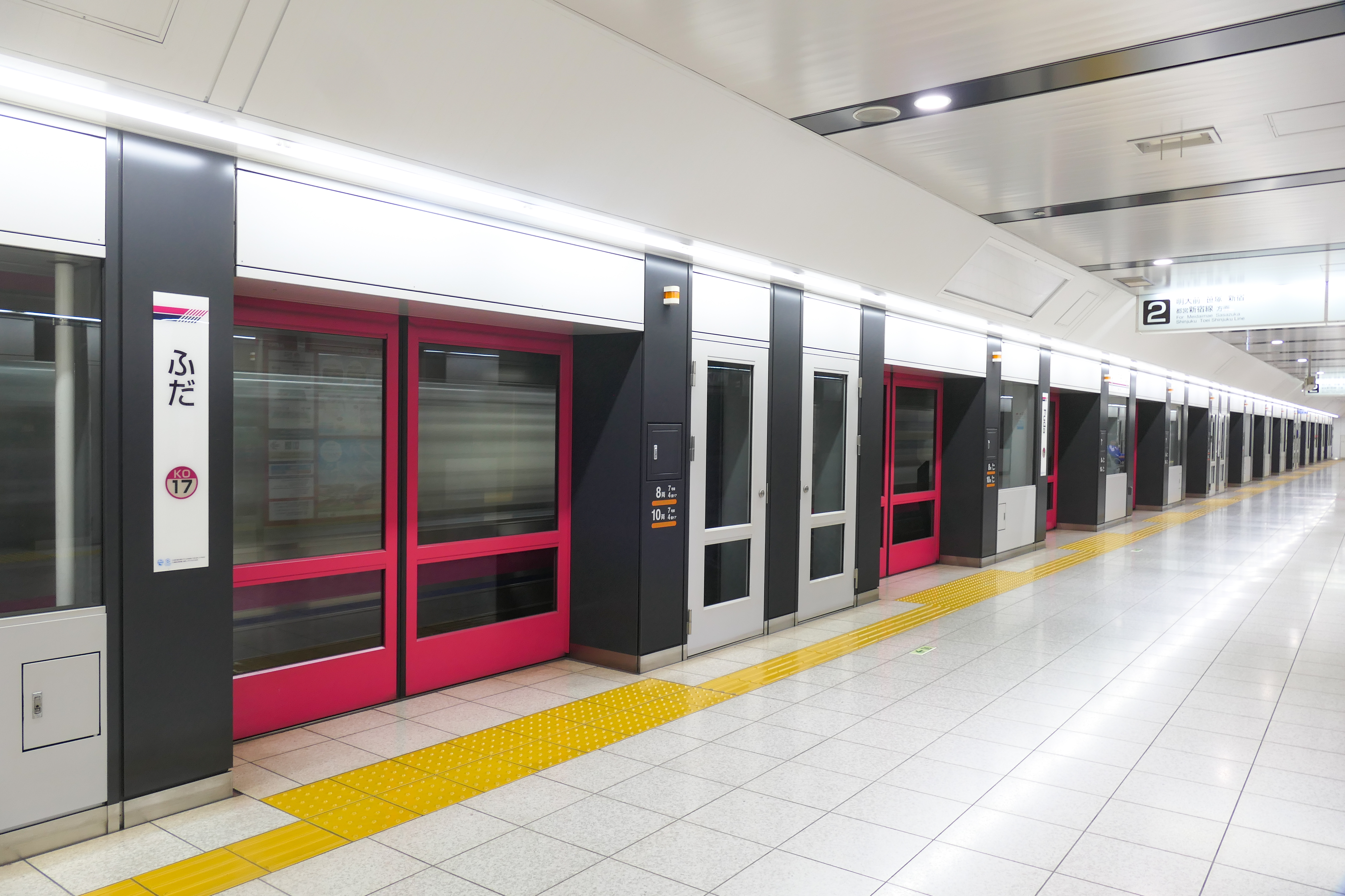
Platform screen doors at Fuda station, Tokyo, Japan, 2023

Platform screen doors (PSDs), also known as platform edge doors (PEDs), are used at some train, rapid transit and people mover stations to separate the platform from train tracks, as well as on some bus rapid transit, tram and light rail systems. Primarily used for passenger safety, they are a relatively new addition to many metro systems around the world, some having been retrofitted to established systems. They are widely used in newer Asian and European metro systems, and Latin American bus rapid transit systems.

== History ==
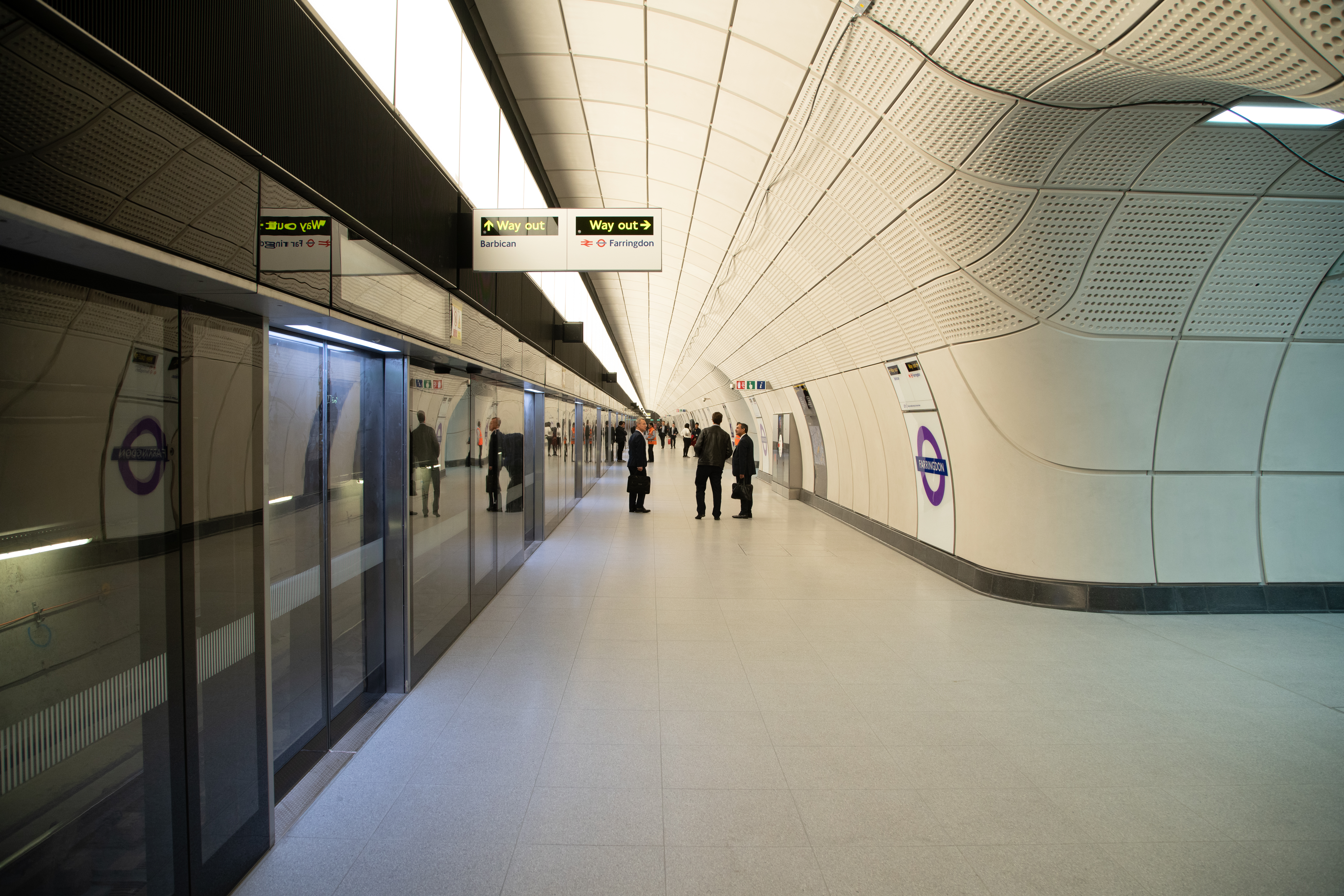
Platform screen doors on the Elizabeth line at Farringdon, 2019

The idea of platform edge doors dates from as early as 1908, when Charles S. Shute of Boston was granted a patent for "Safety fence and gate for railway-platforms". The invention consisted of "a fence for railway platform edges", composed of a series of pickets bolted to the platform edge, and vertically movable pickets that could retract into a platform edge when there was a train in the station. In 1917, Carl Albert West was granted a patent for "Gate for subrailways and the like". The invention provided for spaced guides secured to a tunnel's side wall, with "a gate having its ends guided in the guides, the ends and intermediate portions of the gate having rollers engaging the side wall". Pneumatic cylinders with pistons would be used to raise the gates above the platform when a train was in the station. Unlike Shute's invention, the entire platform gate was movable, and was to retract upward.

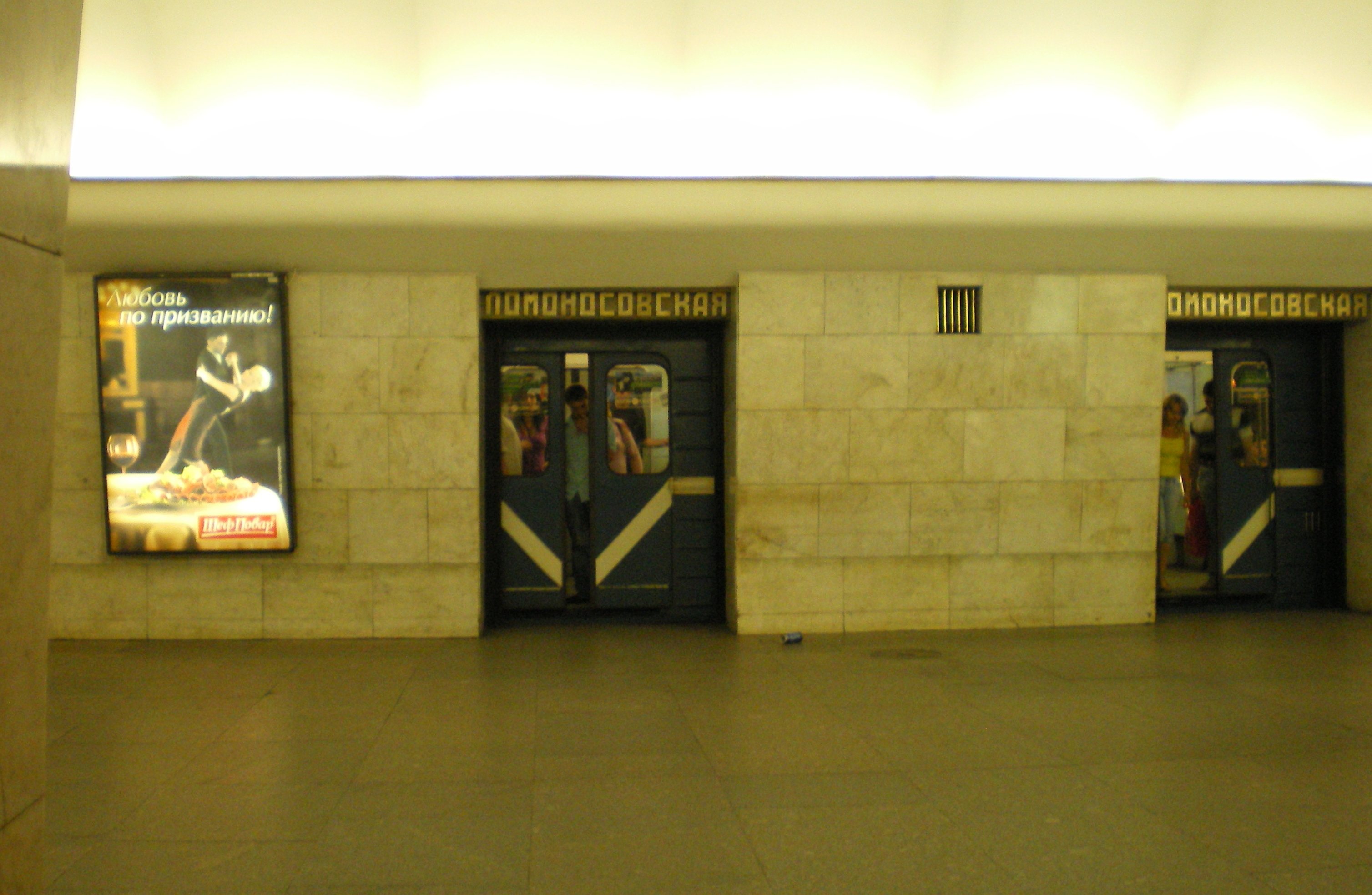
"Horizontal lift" style doors at Lomonosovskaya station on the Saint Petersburg Metro, the first screen doors in the world

The first stations in the world with platform screen doors were the ten stations of the Saint Petersburg Metro's Line 2 that opened between 1961 and 1972. The platform "doors" are actually openings in the station wall which supports the ceiling of the platform. The track tunnels adjoining the ten stations' island platforms were built with tunnel boring machines (TBMs), and the island platforms were located in a separate vault between the two track tunnels. Usually, TBMs bore the deep-level tunnels between stations, while the station vaults are dug out manually and contain both the tracks and the platform. However, in the case of the Saint Petersburg Metro, the TBMs bored a pair of continuous tunnels that passed through ten stations, and the stations themselves were built in vaults that only contained the platform, with small openings on the sides of the vault, in order for passengers to access the trains in the tunnels.

Singapore's Mass Rapid Transit, opened in 1987, is often described as the first heavy Metro system in the world to incorporate PSDs into its stations for climate control and safety reasons, rather than architectural constraints, though the light Lille Metro, opened in 1983, predates it.

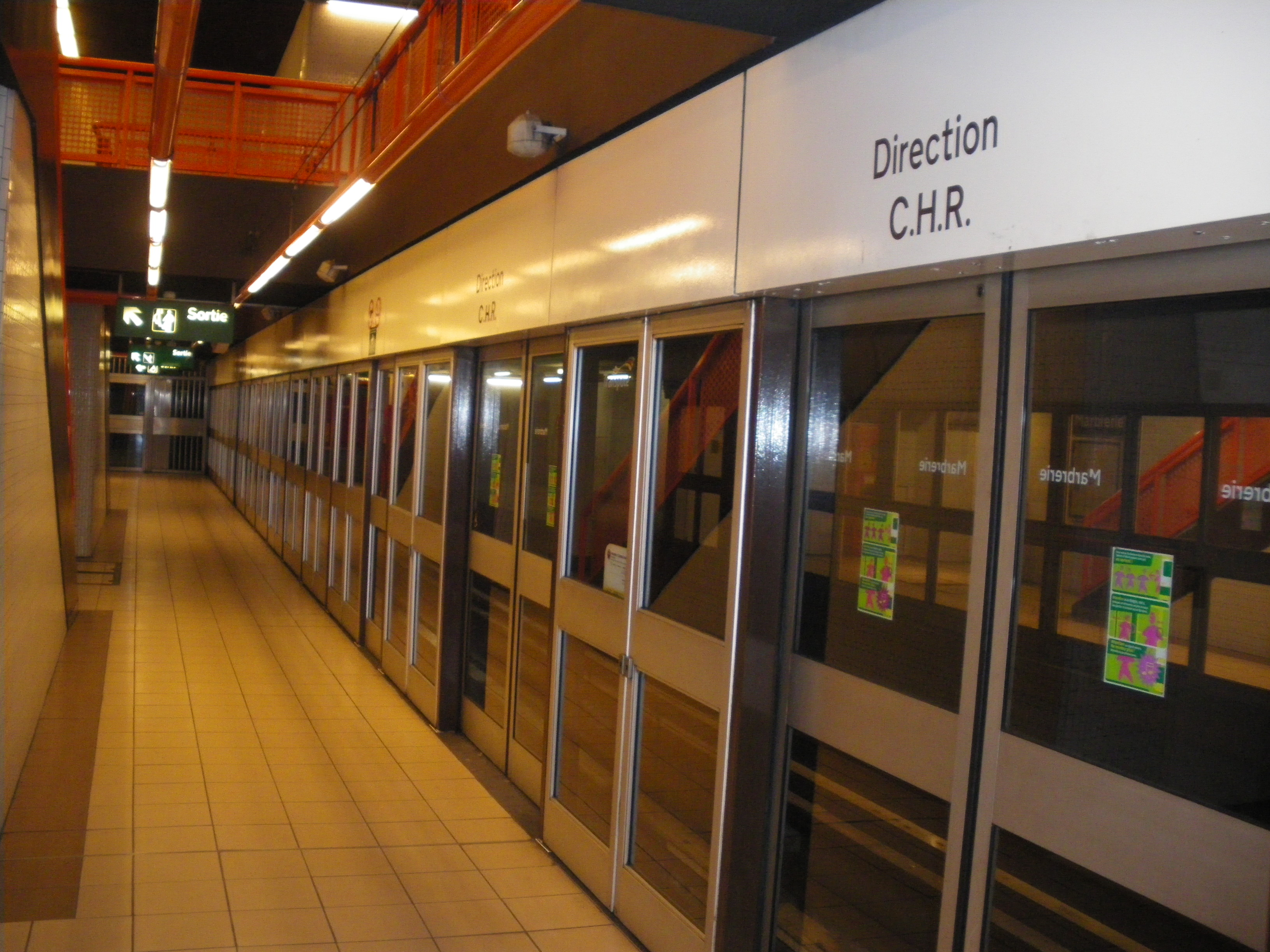
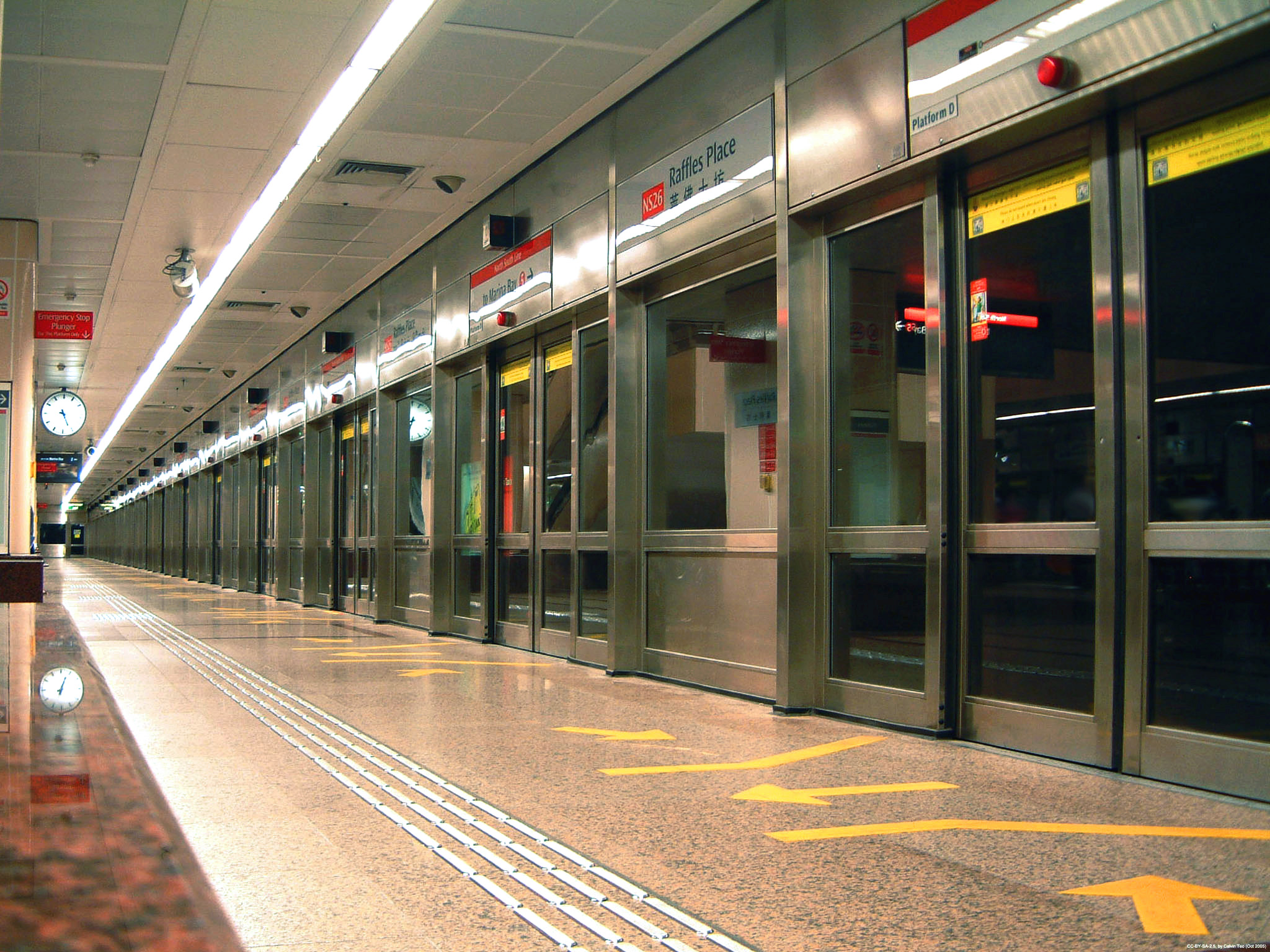
The light rail Lille Metro was the first system to be fitted with glass platform screen doors, predating the heavy rail Singapore MRT.

== Types ==
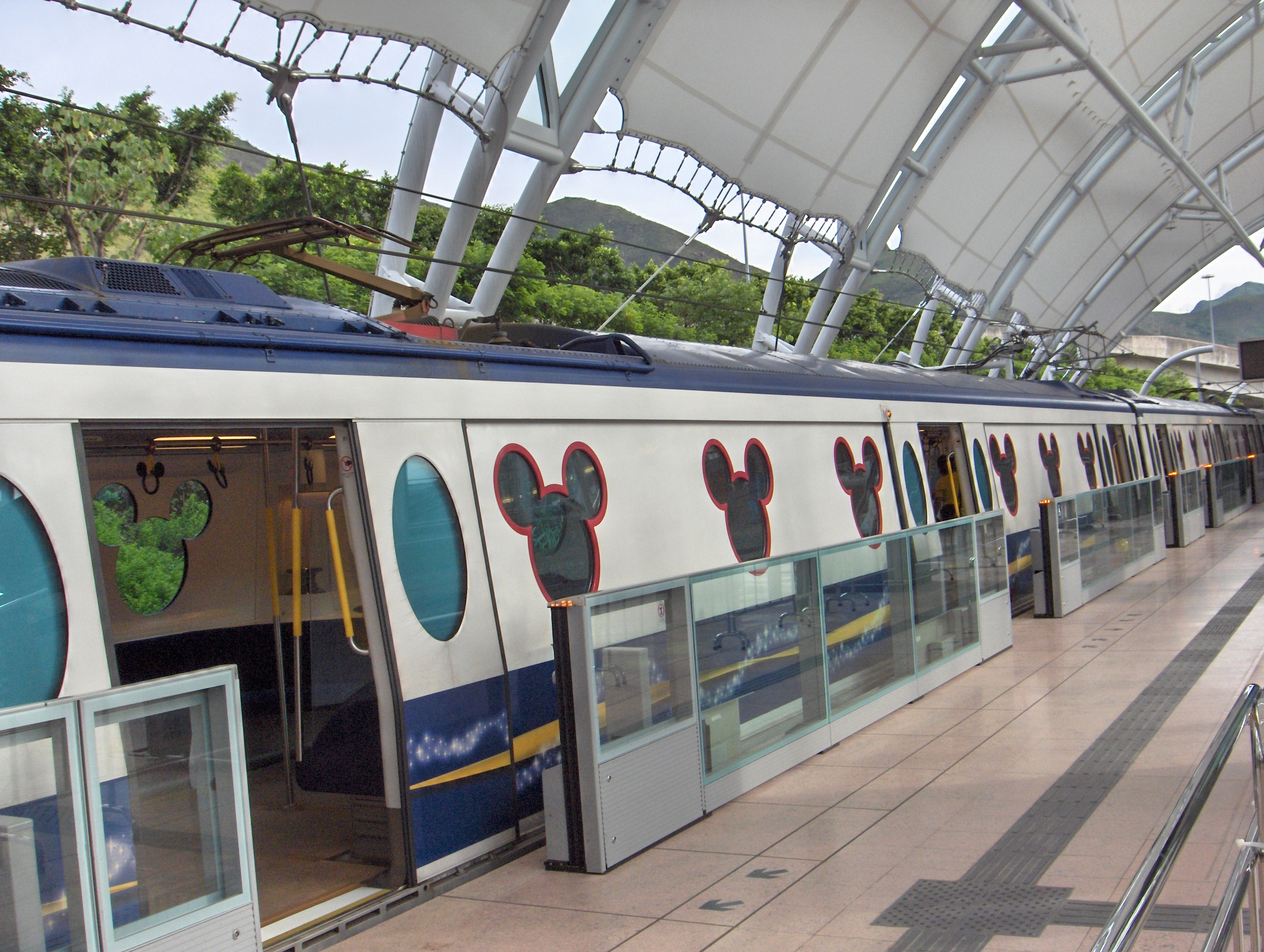
Half-height platform gates at Sunny Bay station on the Disneyland Resort line, Hong Kong

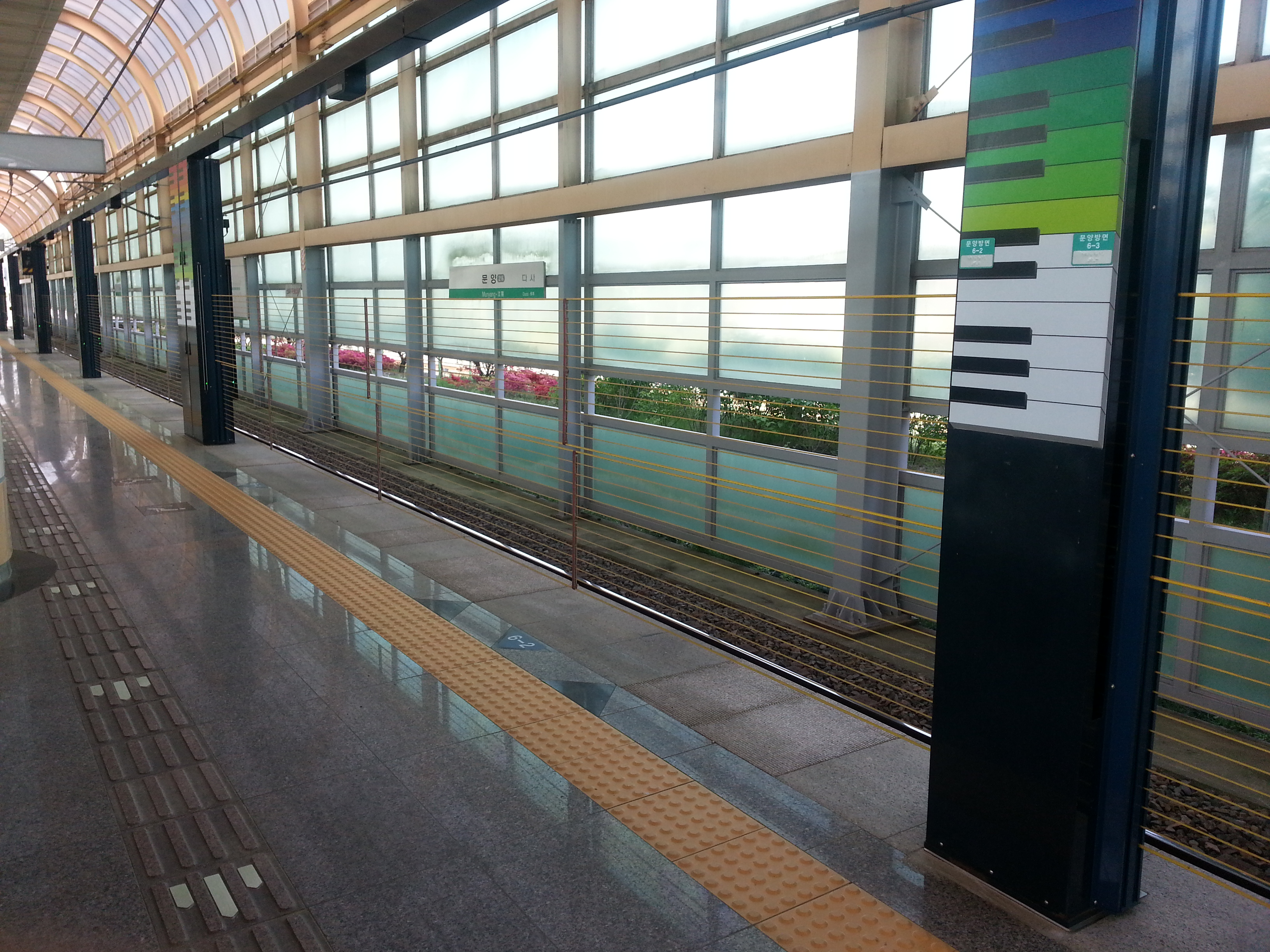
A former Rope-type screen door in Munyang station on the Daegu Metro Line 2, South Korea

Although the terms are often used interchangeably, platform screen doors can refer to both full-height and half-height barriers. Full height platform screen doors are total barriers between the station floor and ceiling, while the half-height platform screen doors are referred to as platform edge doors or automatic platform gates, as they do not reach the ceiling and thus do not create a total barrier. Platform gates are usually only half of the height of the full-screen doors, are chest-height sliding doors at the edge of railway platforms to prevent passengers from falling off the platform edge onto the railway tracks. But they sometimes reach to the height of the train. Like full-height platform screen doors, these platform gates slide open or close simultaneously with the train doors. These two types of platform screen doors are presently the main types in the world.

=== Platform screen doors and platform edge doors ===
The doors help to:

- Prevent people from accidentally falling onto the tracks, getting too close to moving trains, and committing suicide (by jumping) or homicide (by pushing). Use of platform screen doors in South Korea has reduced rail related suicide by 89%.
- Prevent or reduce wind felt by the passengers caused by the piston effect which could in some circumstances cause people to lose their balance.
- Improve safety—reduce the risk of accidents, especially from trains passing through the station at high speeds.
- Improve climate control within the station (heating, ventilation, and air conditioning are more effective when the station is physically isolated from the tunnel). Installation of platform screen doors on Seoul's subway improved cooling efficiency by 30%, which saves 16.7 billion won annually.
- Improve security—access to the tracks and tunnels is restricted.
- Lower costs—eliminate the need for motormen or conductors when used in conjunction with automatic train operation, thereby reducing manpower costs.
- Prevent litter buildup on the tracks, which can be a fire risk, as well as damage and possibly obstruct trains.
- Improve the sound quality of platform announcements, as background noise from the tunnels and trains that are entering or exiting is reduced.
- At underground or indoor platforms, prevent the air from being polluted by the fumes caused by friction from the train wheels grinding against the tracks. Fine dust levels reduced by approximately 20% after installation of platform screen doors on Seoul's subway.

The primary disadvantage of PSDs is their cost. When used to retrofit older systems, they can limit the kind of rolling stock that may be used on a line as the train doors must fit the spacing of the platform doors, which can result in additional costs due to the otherwise unnecessary purchase of new rolling stock and consequent depot upgrades.

Despite delivering an overwhelming improvement to passenger safety at the platform-train interface, platform screen doors do introduce new hazards which must be carefully managed in design and delivery. The principal hazard is entrapment between closed platform doors and the train carriage which, if undetected, can lead to fatality when the train begins to move (see § Incidents). Cases of this happening are rare, and the risk can be minimised with careful design, in particular by interlocking the door system with the signalling system, and minimising the gap between the closed platform doors and the train body. In some cases active monitoring systems are used to monitor this gap.

Half-height platform edge doors, also known as automatic platform gates, are cheaper to install than full-height platform screen doors, which require more metallic framework for support. Some railway operators may therefore prefer such an option to improve safety at railway platforms and, at the same time, keep costs low and non-air-conditioned platforms naturally ventilated. However, these gates are less effective than full platform screen doors in preventing people from intentionally jumping onto the tracks. These gates were first in practical use by the Hong Kong MTR on the Disneyland Resort line for the open-air station designs. Most half-height platform edge door designs have taller designs than the ones installed on the Disneyland Resort line.

=== Rope-type platform screen doors ===
There are also rope-type platform screen doors at stations where a number of train types, with different lengths and train door spacings, use the same platforms. The barriers move upwards, rather than sideways, to let passengers through.

Some Japanese, Korean, Chinese and Eastern European countries have stations that use rope-type screen doors, to lower the cost of installation and deal with the problem of different train types and distances between car doors.

=== Variable-type platform screen doors ===
The first-ever full-height variable screen doors were installed on the underground platforms of Osaka Station, which opened in March 2023, but a few half-height variants can be found on a set installed at the Shinkansen platforms of Shinagawa Station in Tokyo. Their use is rare since they are a much costlier and more complicated alternative to rope-type screen doors. The only difference from the latter is that they move sideways when letting passengers through.

At Osaka Station, the doors are designed as a single block equivalent to the length of one train car. It consists of five units: one wall-like "parent door" suspended from the top and two sets of glass "child doors". When a train reaches the station, a special scanner on the platform reads the information on the ID tag placed on the train to identify its type and the number of cars. Having the type and the number of cars identified, each unit will then slide in place to match the configuration of the train. The parent and child doors then slide into the optimal position to align with the position of each car door.

Since the technology is still new, such doors are still going through testing phases in several countries around the world.

== Use ==
=== Argentina ===
Line D of the Buenos Aires Subte is planned to have platform screen doors installed in the future, after the communications-based train control (CBTC) system has been installed.

=== Australia ===
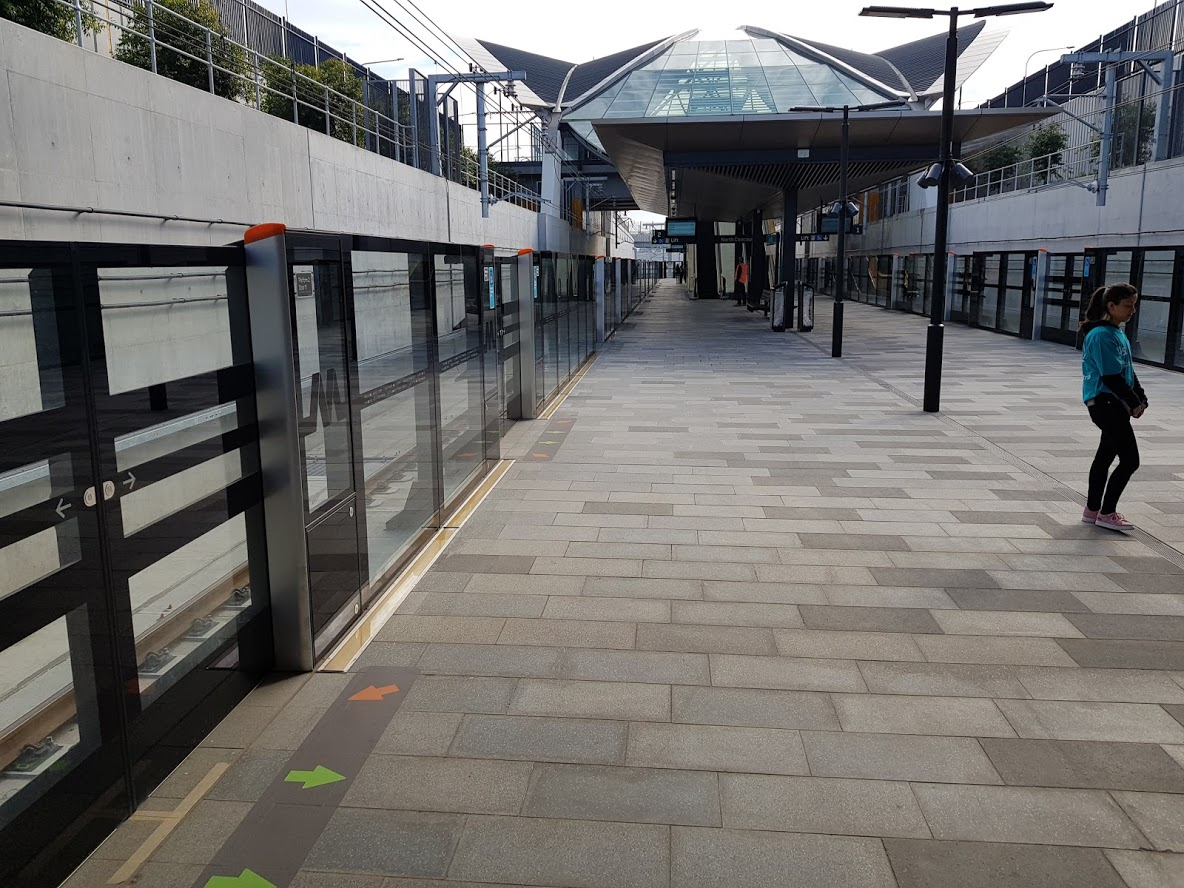
Bella Vista railway station, Sydney

Sydney Metro, which first commenced in May 2019, was the first-fully automated rapid transit rail system in Australia. The M1 Northwest and Bankstown Line, which was extended in 2024 and 2026, have platform screen doors at every station. There are full-height screen doors on most underground platforms, with full-height edge doors on at-grade, elevated and some underground platforms. The existing stations on the Epping to Chatswood railway line and Bankstown Line were upgraded to rapid transit standard from heavy suburban rail, all being fitted with full-height platform edge doors. The future Western Sydney Airport line and Sydney Metro West line will also have platform screen doors at every single station.

Melbourne's Metro Tunnel, from South Kensington to South Yarra, opened in November 2025, with platform screen doors on the underground stations between Arden and Anzac. The new HCMT rolling stock was constructed specifically with doors that will line up with full-height PSDs on the platforms. The fully automated Suburban Rail Loop, which is due to open in 2035, will have platform screen doors at every station.

The Cross River Rail in Brisbane, which is currently under construction and scheduled to open in 2029, will have platform screen doors on the new Boggo Road, Woolloongabba and Albert Street underground stations, and the new underground platforms of Roma Street station.

=== Austria ===
Currently, only the Serfaus U-Bahn and a portion of Line U2 of the Vienna U-Bahn (from Schottentor station to Karlsplatz station) use platform screen doors. The section of Line U2 with platform screen doors was converted as part of the construction of Line U5 (which will use platform screen doors throughout) and was reopened on 6 December 2024 after three years of construction.

=== Bangladesh ===
The Dhaka Metro Rail uses half-height platform screen doors at all of its elevated stations.

=== Belarus ===
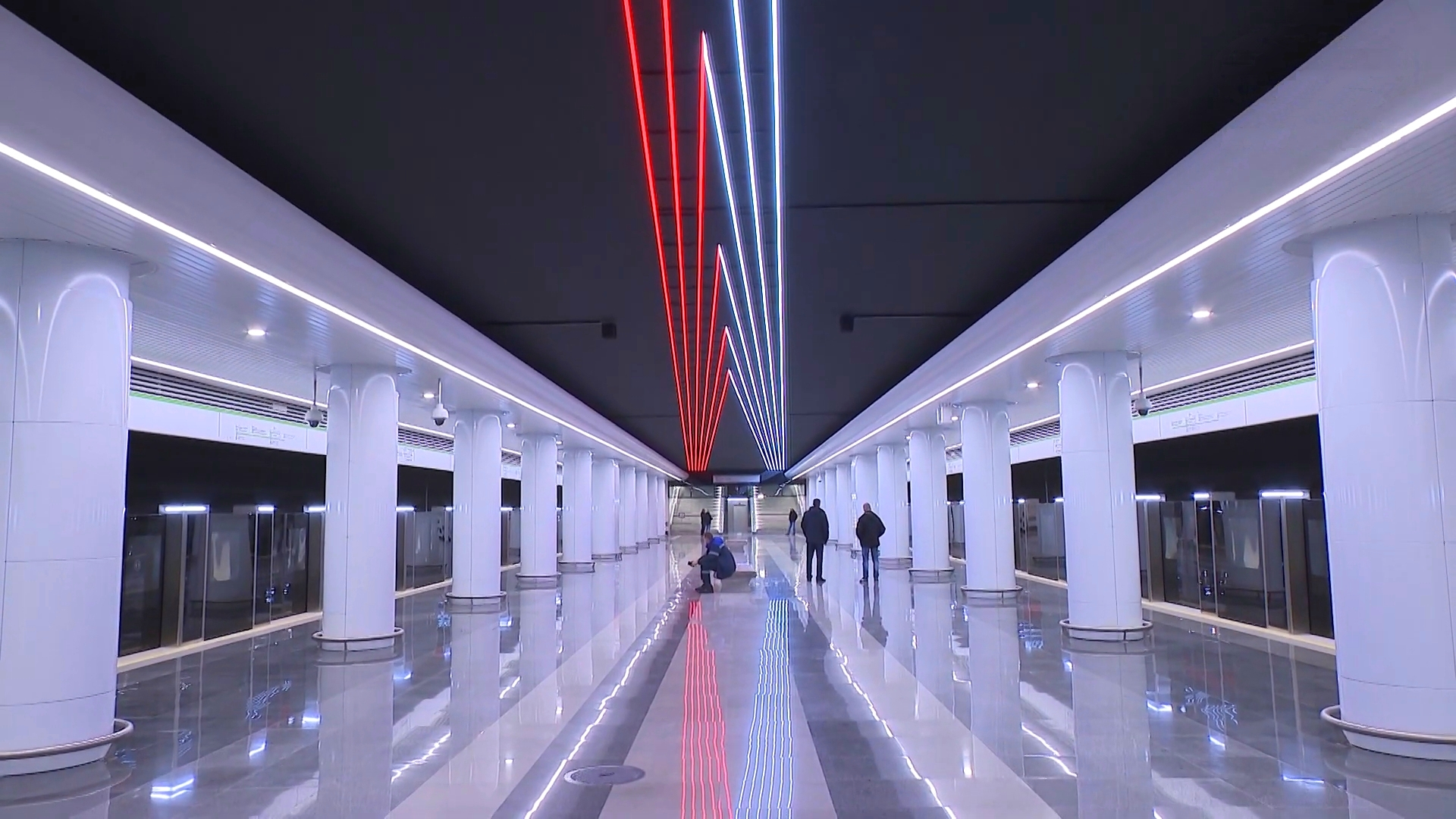
Vakzaĺnaja Station on Line 3 of the Minsk Metro

Platform screen doors are being installed on Line 3 of the Minsk Metro, which first opened in late 2020, and will be installed at stations on the later sections of the line.

=== Brazil ===
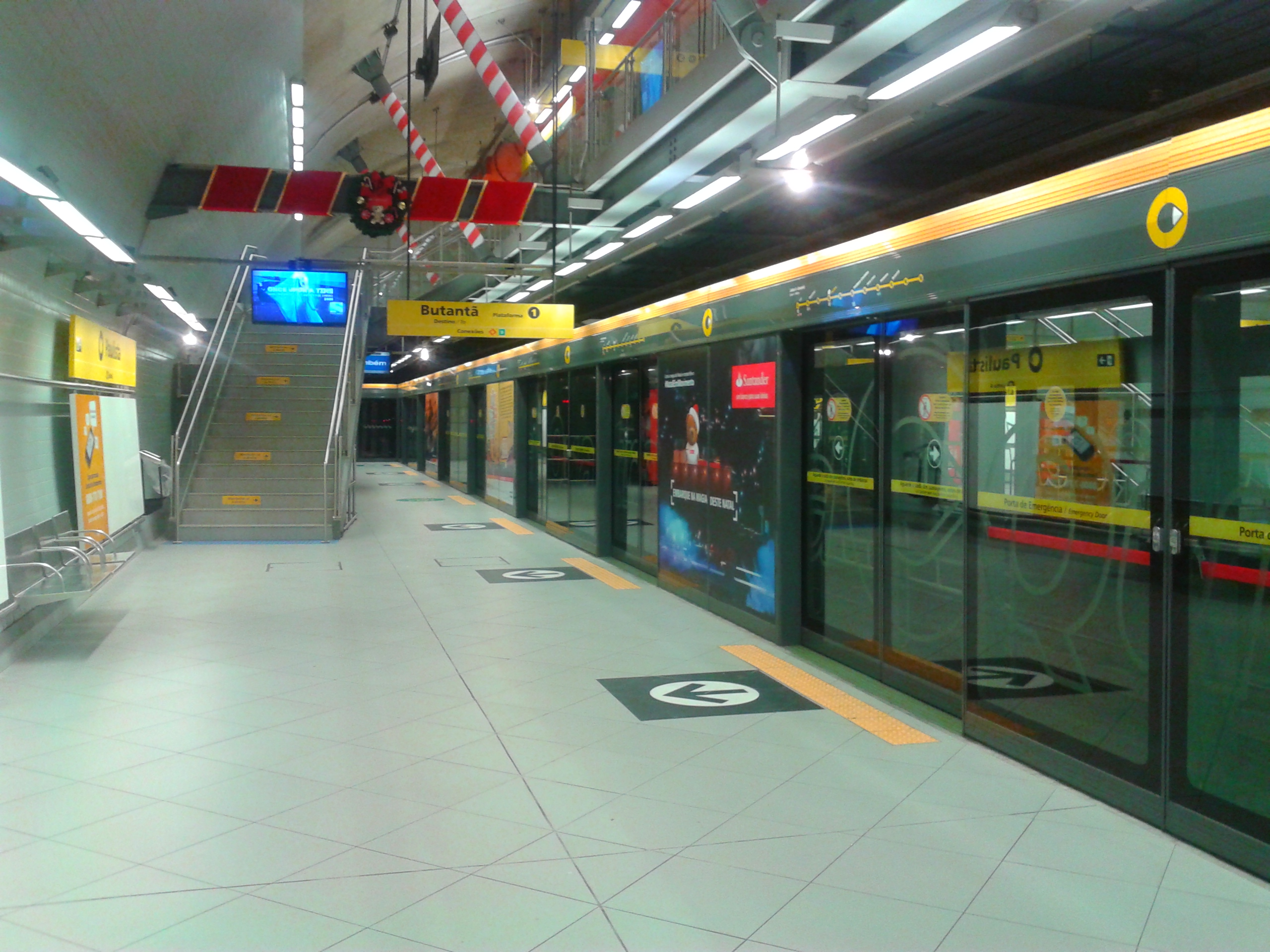
Paulista Station on São Paulo Metro's Line 4, the first fully automated transit line in Latin America

The Platform Screen Doors have been present in the São Paulo Metro since 2010, when the Sacomã Station was opened. As of 2019, five of the six lines of the São Paulo Metro have the equipment: Lines 4 - Yellow, 5 - Lilac and 15 - Silver have the equipment installed in all of its stations. The feature is also present in some stations of Line 2 - Green and Line 3 - Red. They are planned to be installed in 41 stations of lines 1, 2 and 3 by the end of 2021, as well as all stations of line 5 by the end of 2020.

PSDs are also found on the tube stations of the RIT BRT and in the Santos Light Rail since 2016.

=== Bulgaria ===
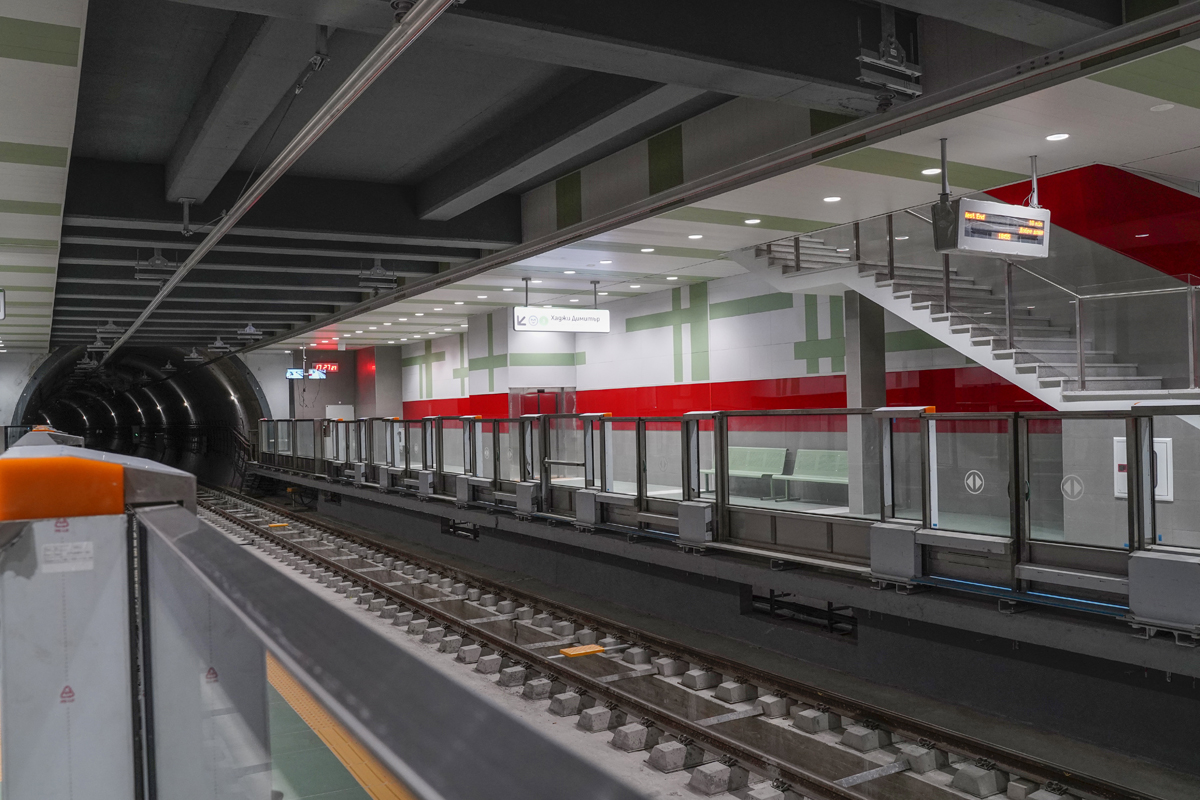
Bulgaria station on Line 3 of the Sofia Metro in Bulgaria

Half-height platform screen doors are in use on all stations of the Sofia Metro Line 3.

In 2021, rope-type screen door (RSD) system was installed in the junction Slivnitsa - Vasil Levski Stadium, as well as the G.M. Dimitrov, Mladost I and Inter Expo Center – Tsarigradsko shose stations of the Sofia Metro - Line 1. “Standard” platform doors cannot be used on those lines because of the differing door layouts between the 81-717/714 and 81-740/741 models used. In total, such rope-type safety barriers are installed on 12 of the busiest stations on the Line 1 of the Sofia Metro, providing increased safety for passengers and protecting against accidental falls.

=== Canada ===
Screen doors are in use at all three Terminal Link stations and the Union and Pearson Airport stations along the Union Pearson Express route to Toronto Pearson International Airport in Mississauga, Ontario. Platform screen doors will be installed at all stations on Toronto's forthcoming Ontario Line. In addition, as a part of major renovations and expansions to the Bloor–Yonge subway interchange station, platform screen doors will be installed on both Line 1 platforms. The doors will also be installed on the Line 2 platforms once CBTC signalling upgrades are made to the line. The addition of such doors at Bloor–Yonge station has prompted rumours of a broader system wide rollout, including in the forthcoming Scarborough subway extension and Yonge North subway extension, though no confirmation or funding has been announced by the Toronto Transit Commission or Metrolinx.

Greater Montreal's Réseau express métropolitain (REM), the 67-kilometre-long driverless complementary suburban rapid transit network opening in five phases between 2023 and 2027 features screen doors at each of its stations.

With the advent of the REM on the horizon, calls to retrofit platform edge doors in the Montreal Metro to combat delays arising from overcrowding are becoming more common. If full-height doors were to be installed, it may reduce the difficulty in opening station entrance doors at ground level due to the pressure imbalance caused by passing trains. Given that there are two different train door layouts on the Montreal Metro, with the older MR-73 trains having 4 doors on each side of the car, and MPM-10 having 3, it is unlikely platform doors will be showing up in the Montreal Metro until the retirement of the MR-73 fleet.

In June 2023, the operator of the Vancouver SkyTrain, TransLink announced a feasibility study into installing platform screen doors on the Expo and Millennium lines. Such installation was previously deemed infeasible, due to SkyTrain's diverse fleet and different door positions. However, with the acquisition of the Alstom Mark V trains, which will replace the ageing Mark I, the door positions allow for a feasibility study to proceed. The results will be released sometime in 2025.

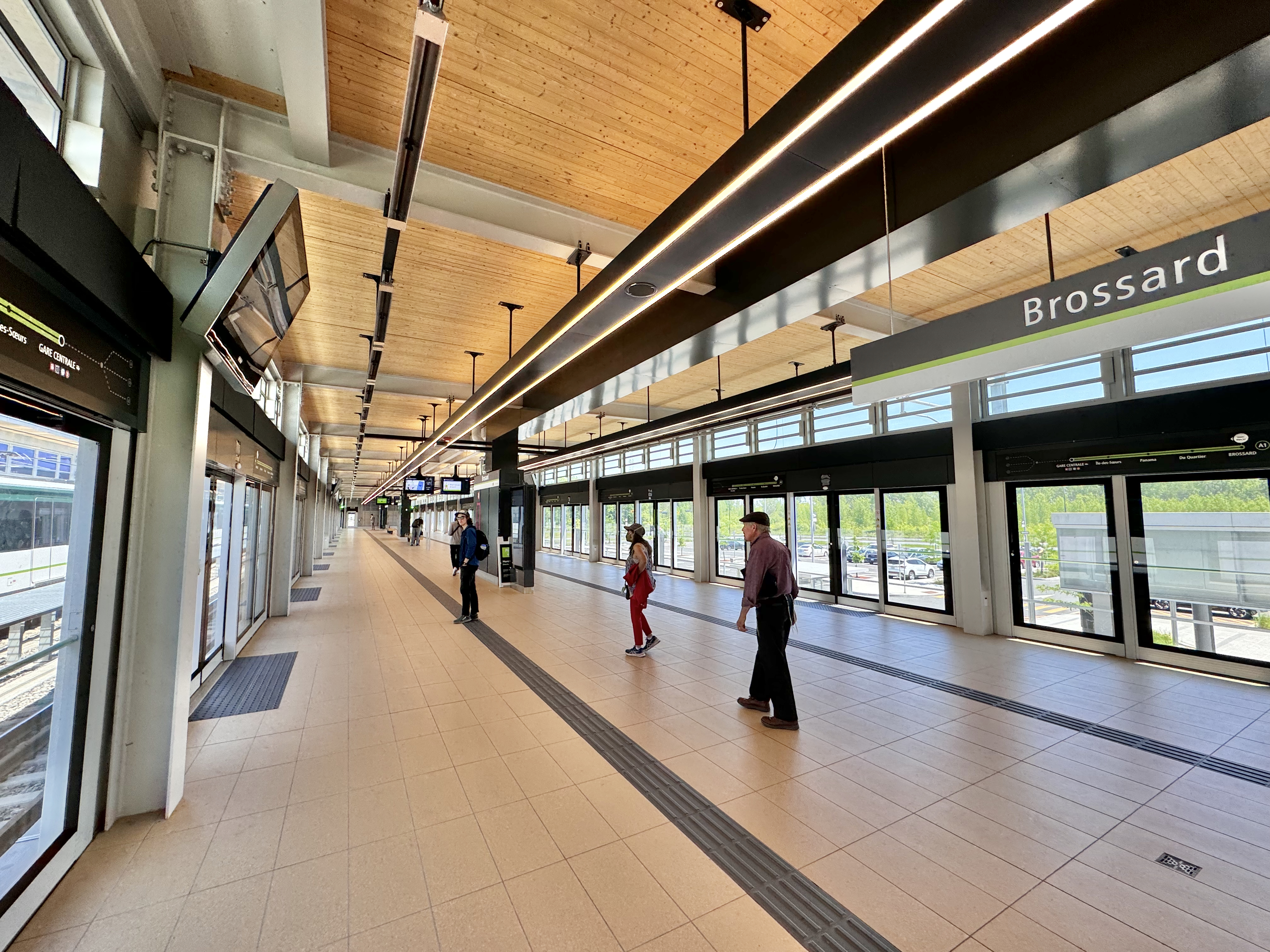
Platform screen doors on Brossard station of Montreal's Réseau express métropolitain

=== Chile ===
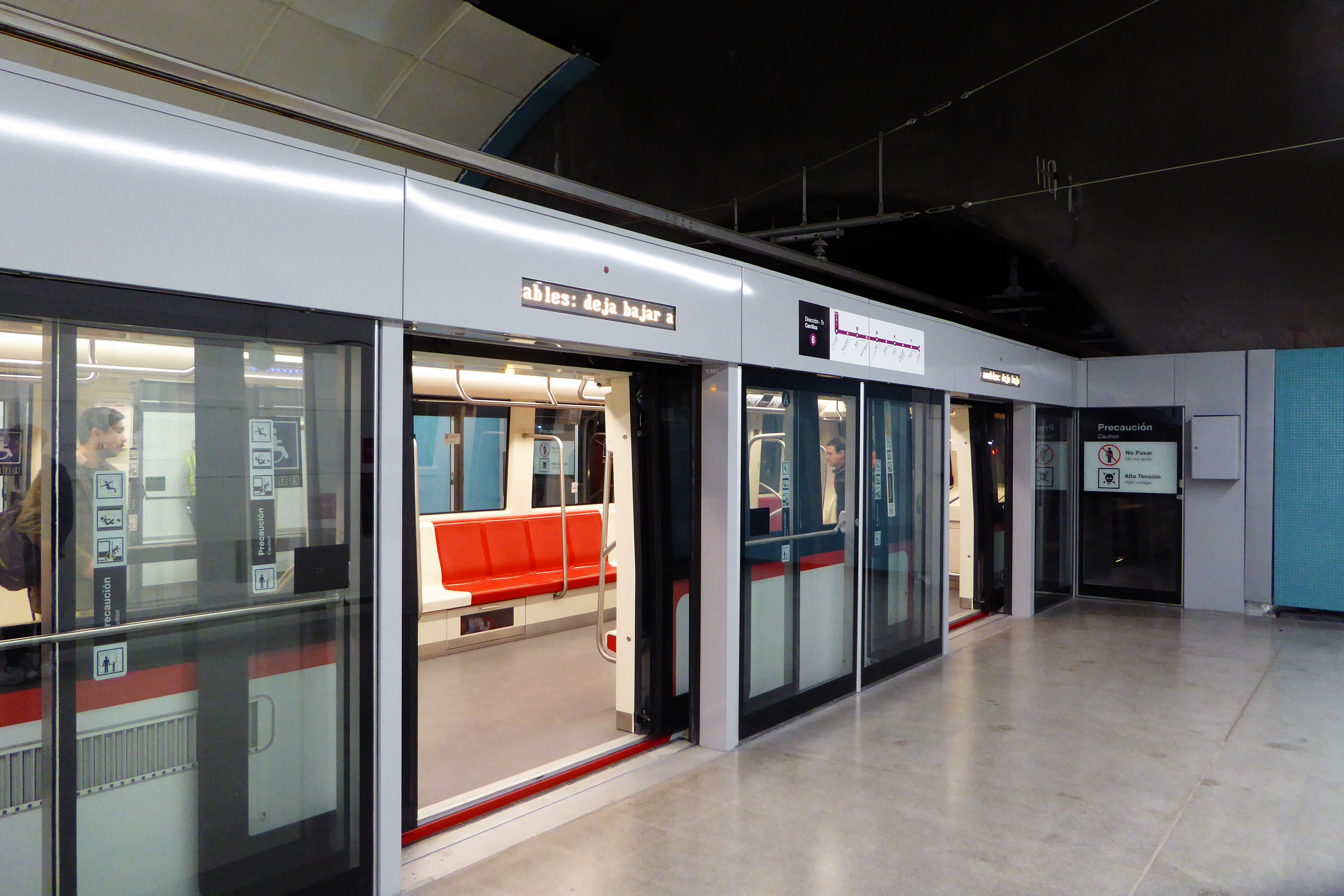
Line 6 of the Santiago Metro, inaugurated in November 2017, introduced the platform doors and converted it into one of the most modern in Latin America.

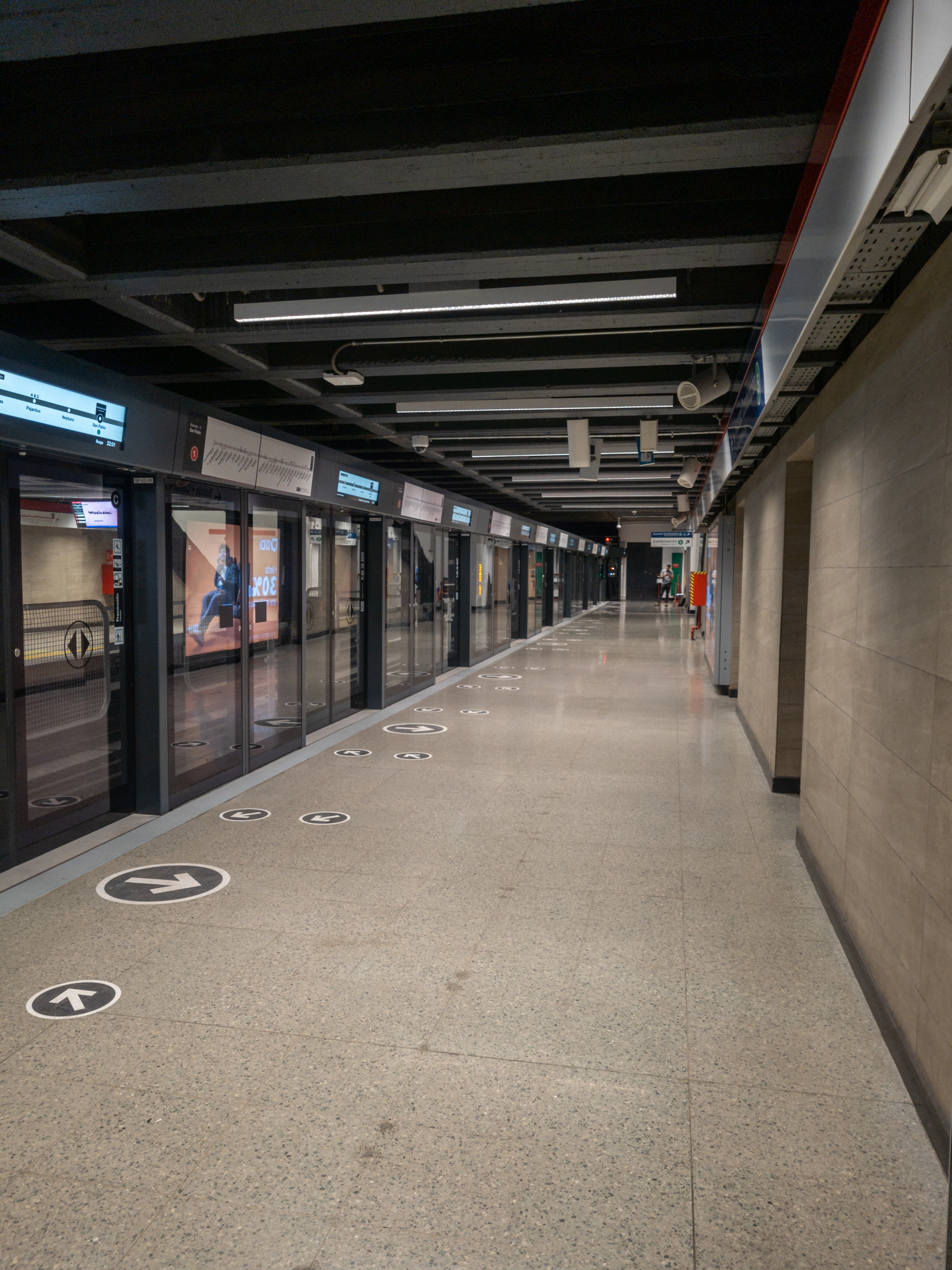
Platform screen doors at San Pablo station on line 1 now installed.

Currently, platform screen doors are in use on lines 3 and 6 of the Santiago Metro, a new feature for the system. Installation of platform screen doors on Line 1 stations began in 2025, starting at San Pablo station, where the doors became operational on March 2, 2026.

=== Mainland China ===
All metro systems in China have platform screen doors installed on most of their lines. All stations built after the mid-2000s have some form of platform barrier. Guangzhou Metro Line 2, which opened in 2002, is the first metro system in mainland China to have installed platform screen doors since its completion. The older Guangzhou Metro Line 1 also completed the installation of platform screen doors between 2006 and 2009. Only the Dalian Metro lines 3, 12, and 13, Wuhan Metro line 1 and Changchun Metro lines 3, 4, and 8 have stations without the platform screen doors on their early lines (As of 21 September 2019). However many are starting the process of retrofitting these lines with platform screen gates.

In addition, many bus rapid transit systems such as the Guangzhou Bus Rapid Transit also have stops that are equipped with platform screen doors. Platform screen doors are also present in some tram and light rail stops such as the Xijiao Light rail, Nanjing tram and Chengdu tram.

Several underground high speed railway stations of the CRH network use platform screen doors set back from the platform edge.

In addition, Fengxian District in Shanghai installed platform gates at a road crossing.

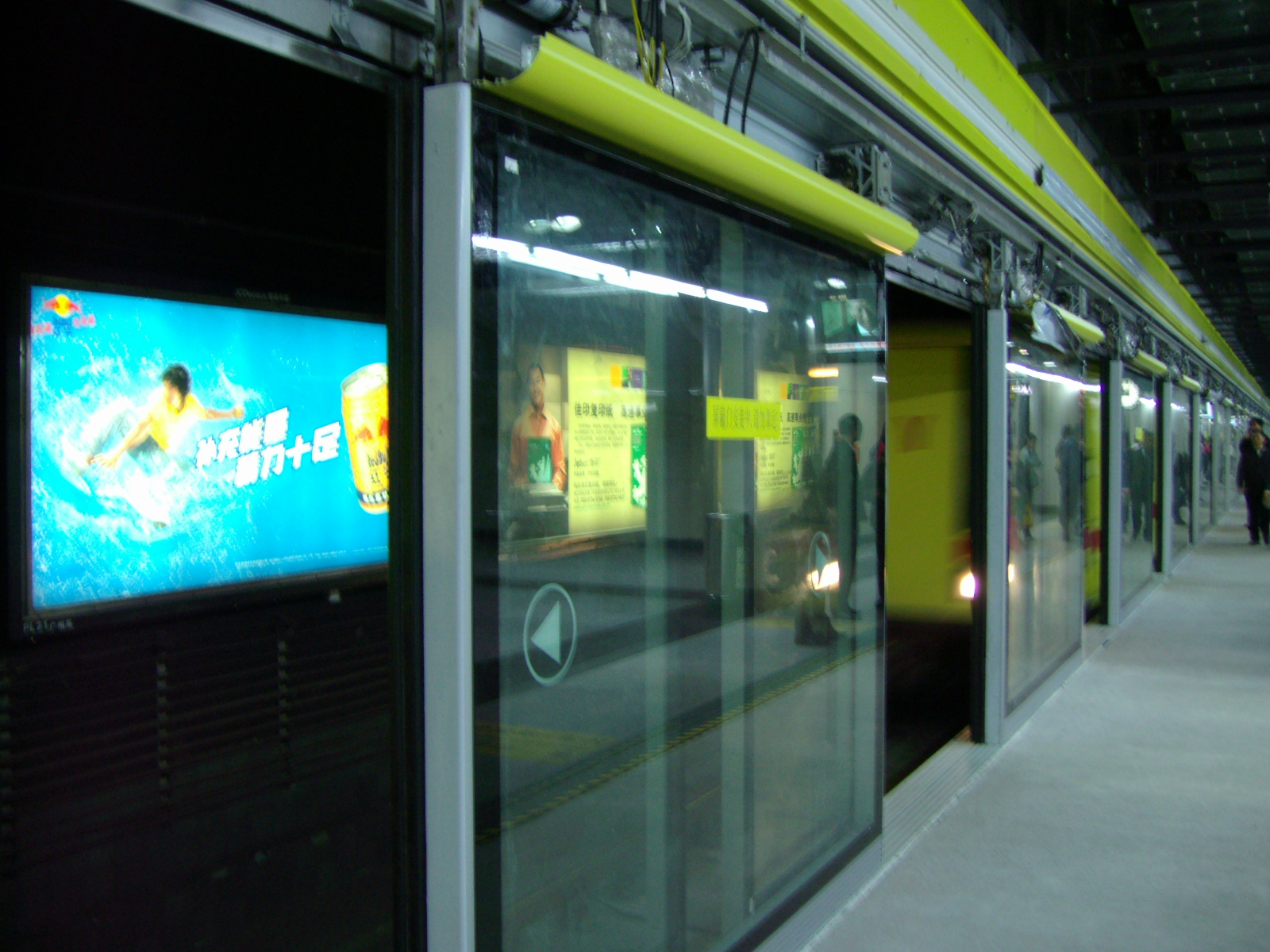
Retrofitting for PSDs on Guangzhou Line 1

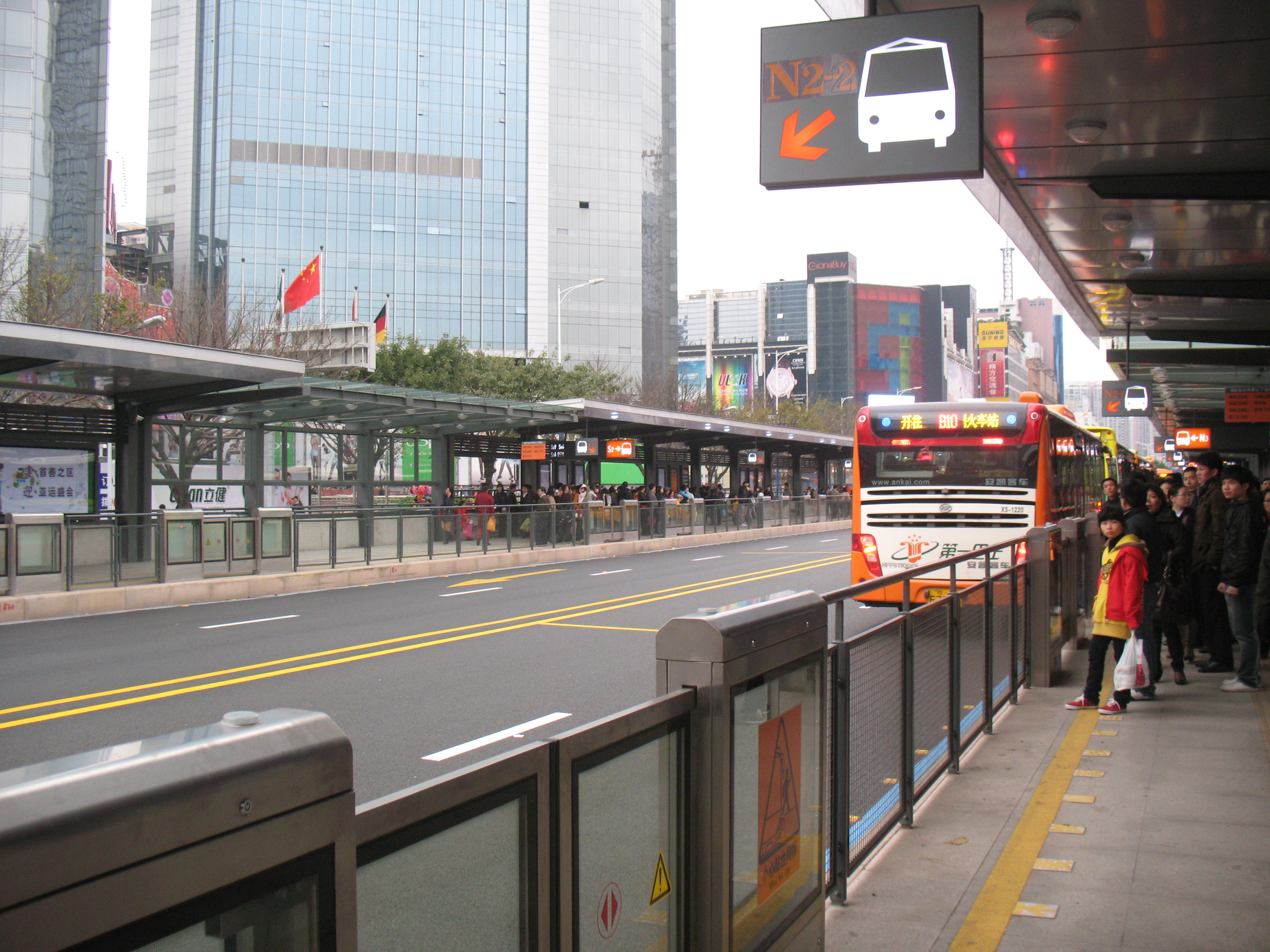
The platform screen door of Tianhe Sports Center Station in Guangzhou BRT

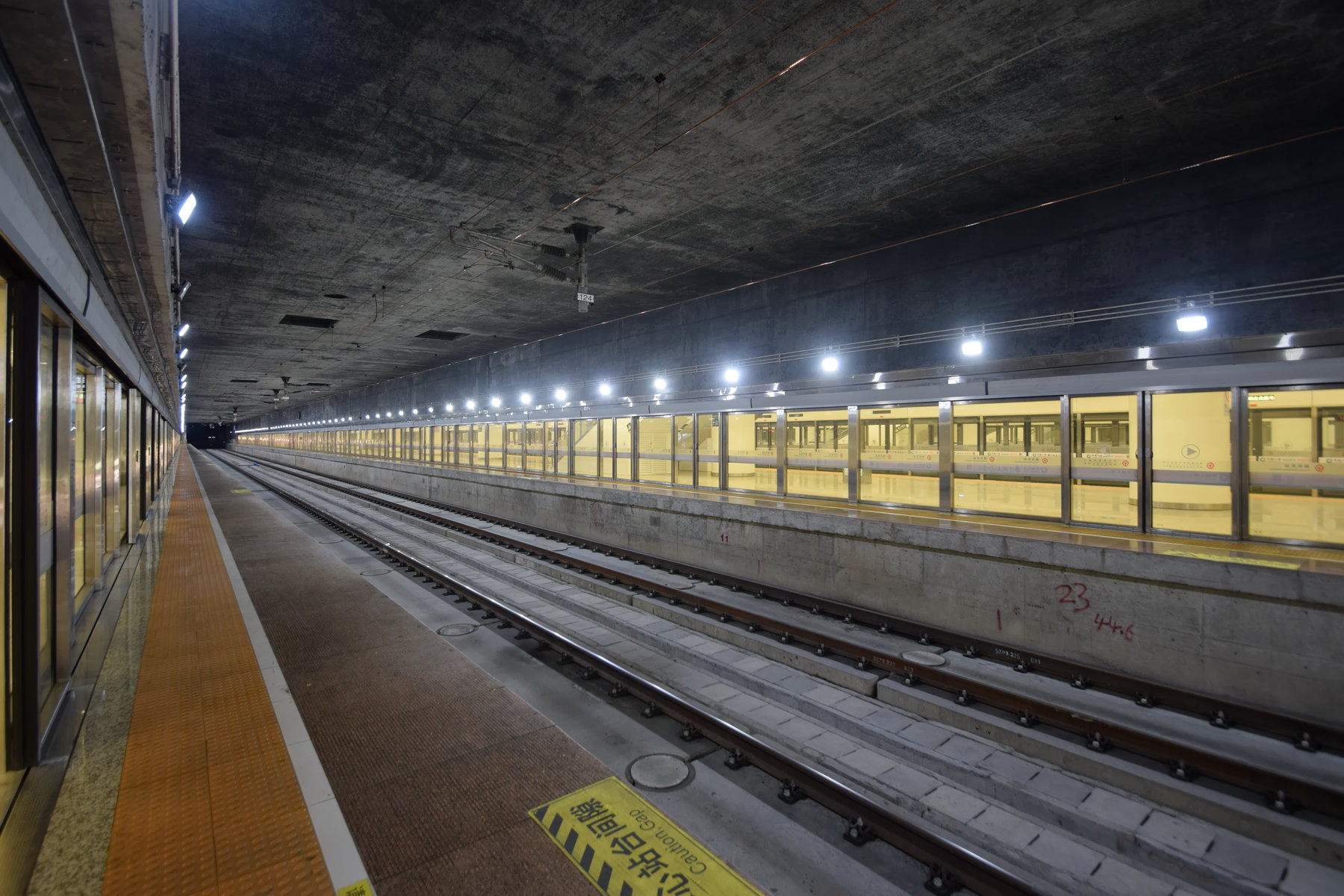
Futian station, an underground station on the Guangzhou–Shenzhen–Hong Kong Express Rail Link, with screen doors on the platform

=== Colombia ===
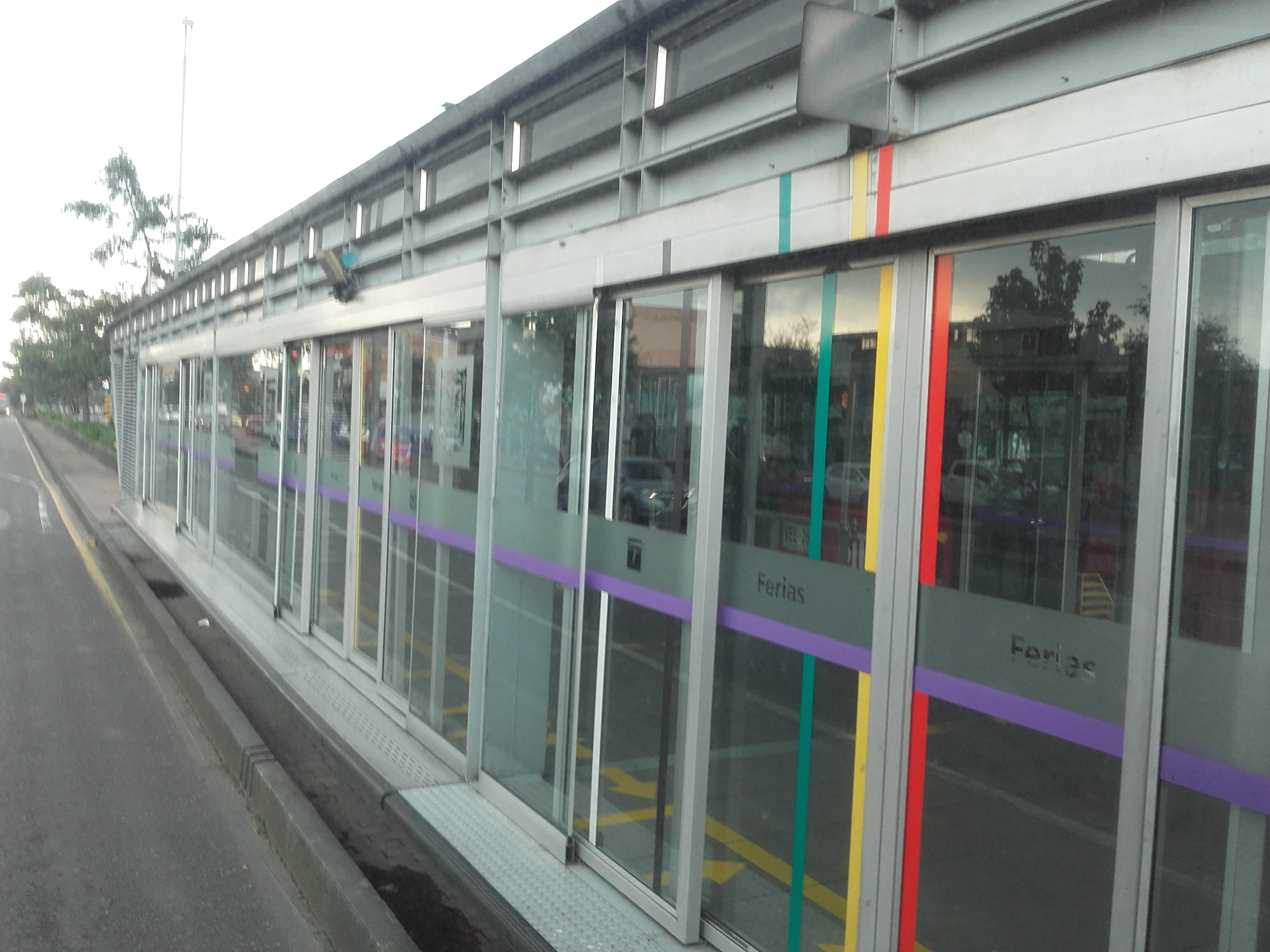
A TransMilenio bus rapid transit station in Bogotá with platform screen doors

Several stations on Bogota's TransMilenio bus rapid transit system use platform screen doors. The Ayacucho Tram in Medellin also has half-height platform doors at every station.

=== Czech Republic ===
Prague Metro's D line plans include platform screen doors at every station, mainly due to it being the first line to use autonomous rolling stock. Currently, platform screen doors are being tested on certain stations on the other lines.

=== Denmark ===
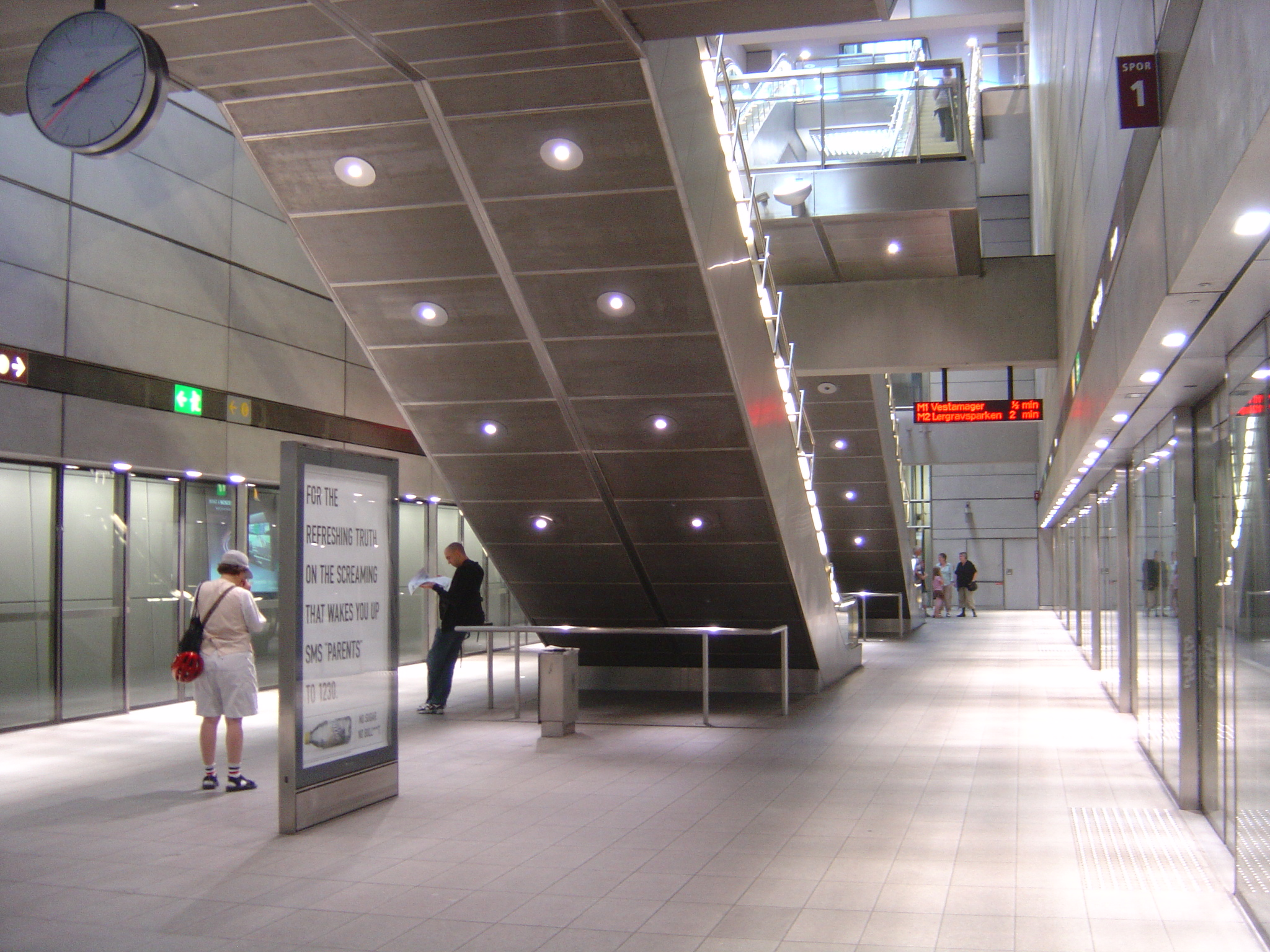
Deep-level station design at Forum Station in Copenhagen Metro

The Copenhagen Metro uses Westinghouse and Faiveley platform screen doors on all platforms. Full-height doors are used on underground stations while surface level stations have half-height doors (except from Lufthavnen and Orientkaj). Underground stations have had platform doors since opening, while above ground stations on lines 1 and 2 did not initially, and were installed later.

=== Finland ===
The Helsinki Metro had a trial run with Faiveley automatic platform gates installed on a single platform at Vuosaari metro station during phase one of the project. The doors, which are part of the Siemens metro automation project, were built in 2012. Phase 2 of the project has been delayed due to metro automation technical and safety related testings. The doors were removed in 2015.

=== France ===
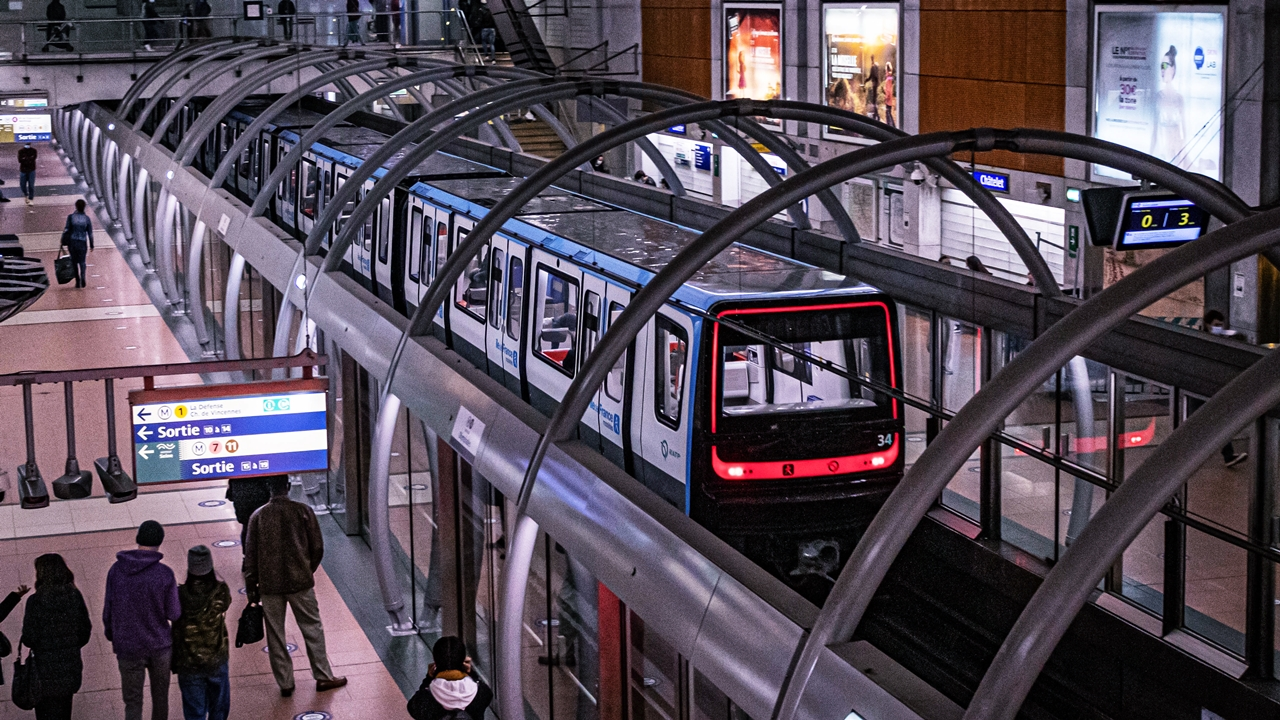
Train at Châtelet on Paris Metro Line 14

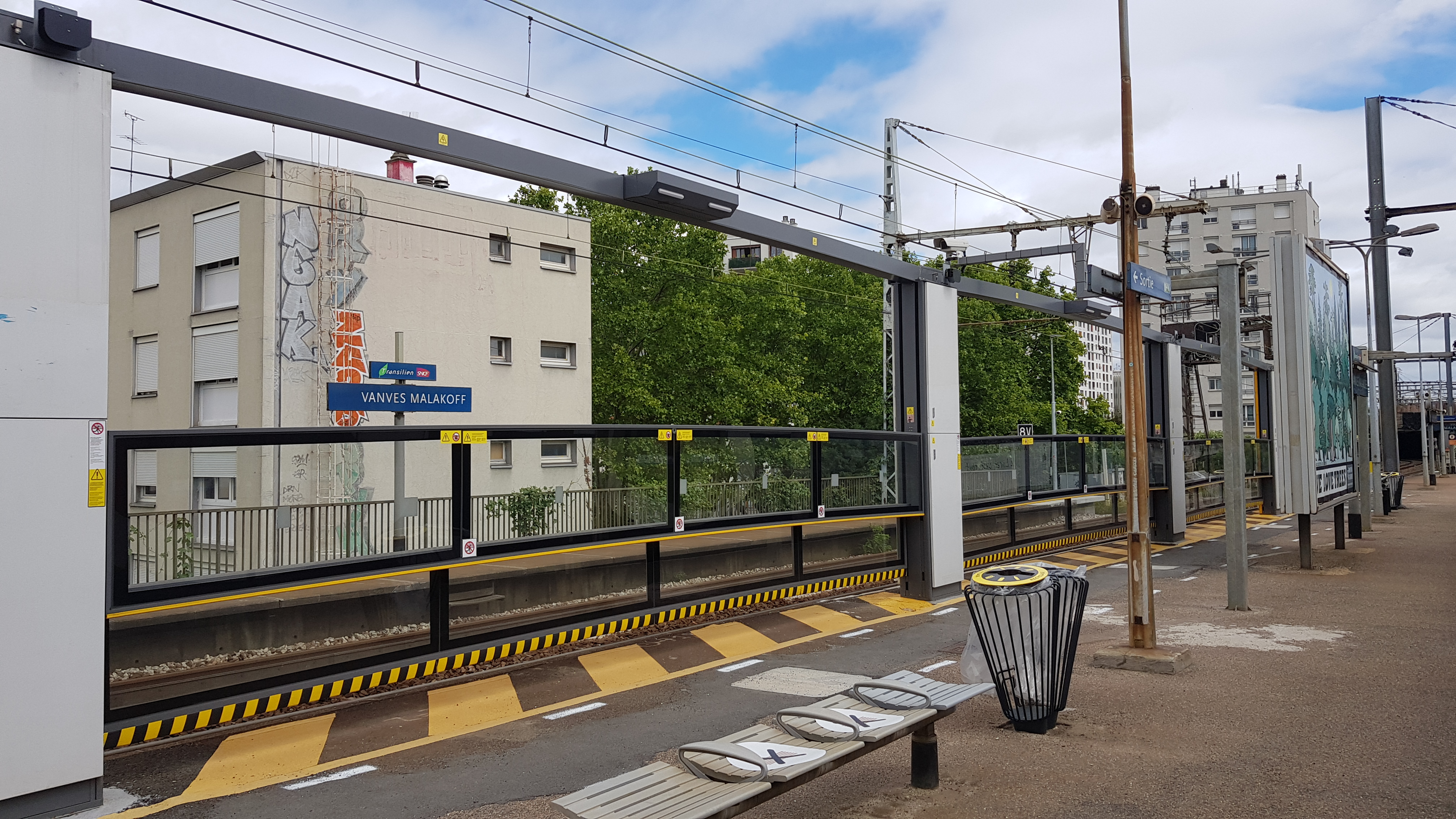
Platform curtains at Vanves–Malakoff station

All lines of the VAL automated subway system are equipped with platform screen doors at every station, starting with Lille subways in 1983. Those also include Toulouse and Rennes as well as the CDGVAL and Orlyval airport shuttles.

Paris Metro's Line 14 from Saint-Lazare to Bibliothèque François Mitterrand was inaugurated in 1998 with platform screen doors manufactured by Faiveley Transport. The new station Olympiades opened with platform screen doors in June 2007. Lines 1 and 4 have been retrofitted with platform edge doors, for full driverless automation effective in 2012 and 2023, respectively. Some stations on Line 13 have had platform edge doors since 2010 to manage their overcrowding, after tests conducted in 2006.

Since 30 June 2020, a new kind of vertical platform screen doors, called platform curtains, are being tested on the platform 2bis of Vanves–Malakoff station (in Paris region) on the Transilien Line N commuter rail line. The experiment should end in February 2021. Transilien said that they preferred platform curtains to classical screen doors for this line because the positioning of the doors is not the same across the rolling stock, and that they plan to install them in other Transilien stations if the experiment is successful.

With the new Grand Paris Express, new stations automatically implement full platform screen doors, starting with the Line 14 extension from Saint-Denis–Pleyel to Orly Airport since 2024.

=== Germany ===
People movers at Frankfurt International Airport, Munich International Airport and Düsseldorf Airport are equipped with platform screen doors, as well as the suspended monorail in Dortmund, called H-Bahn. Plans were underway to test platform screen doors on the Munich U-Bahn in 2023, but these have been delayed indefinitely due to budgetary and signalling constraints.

All stations on the forthcoming line U5 on the Hamburg U-Bahn will feature full-height platform screen doors.

=== Greece ===
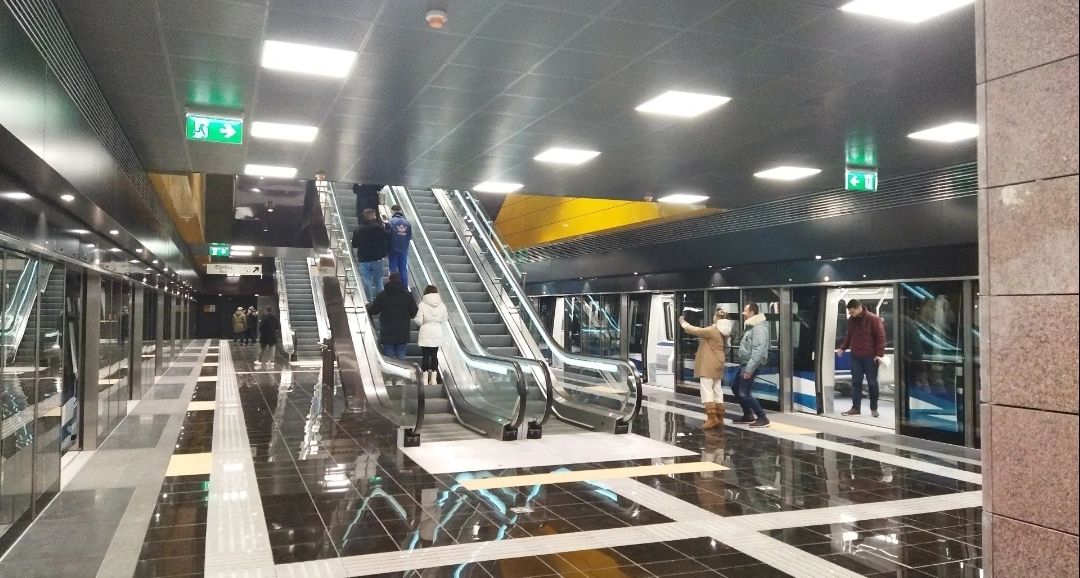
Agias Sofias metro station. Thessaloniki Metro stations are equipped with platform screen doors on island platforms.

Platform screen doors are used on the driverless Thessaloniki Metro, which opened in November 2024. In addition, platform screen doors will be used in the under construction Line 4 of the Athens Metro.

=== Hong Kong ===
As of 5 June 2025, all heavy rail and medium-capacity railway platforms have been equipped with either platform screen doors or automatic platform gates. Automatic platform gates are currently used at all at-grade and elevated stations, while platform screen doors are used in all underground and some at-grade or elevated stations. None of the light rail platforms have platform screen doors or automatic platform gates installed.

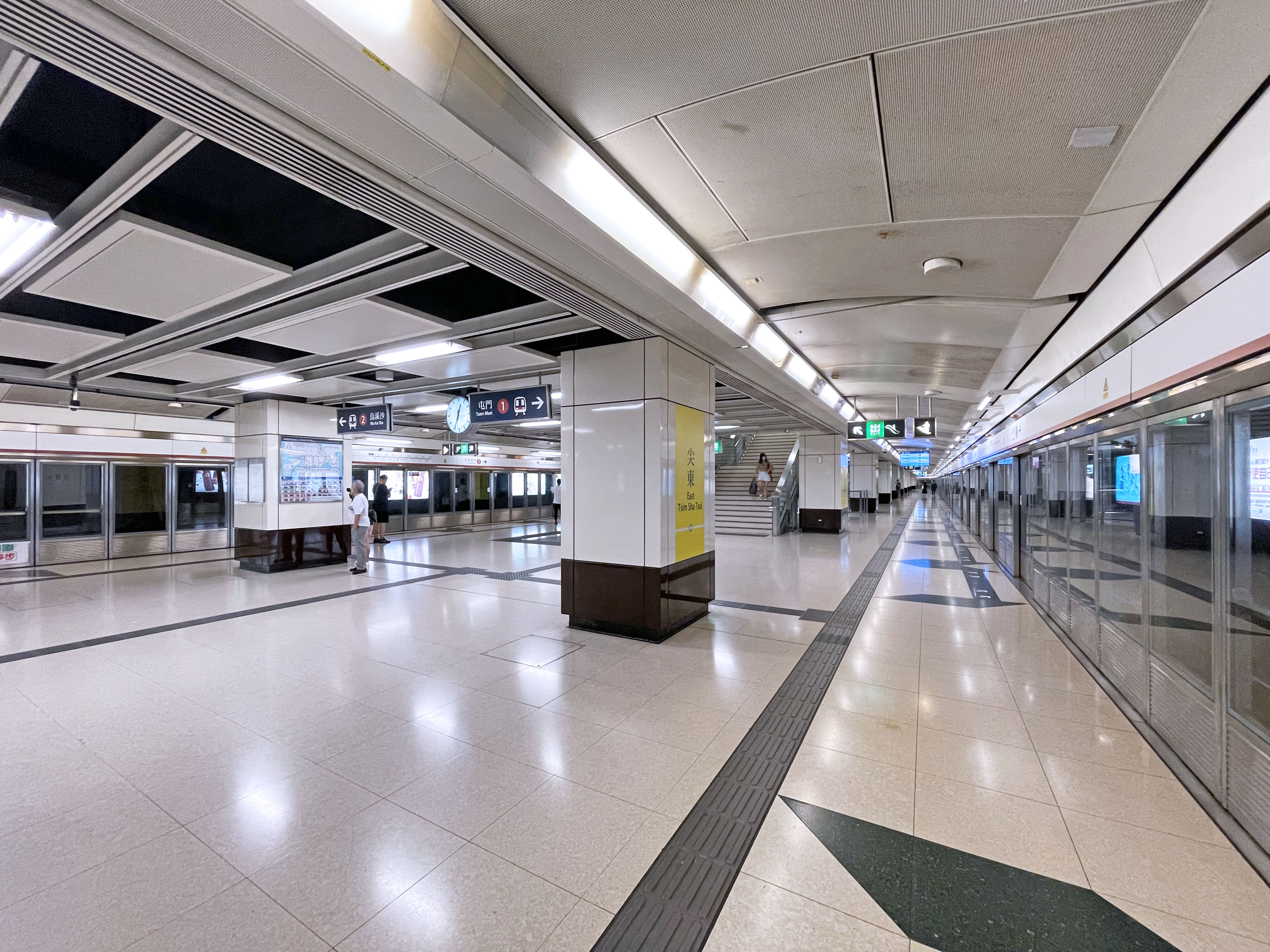
East Tsim Sha Tsui station has had the longest set of platform screen doors in the world, since its opening in 2004, but a third have been out of service since the station began serving shorter trains on the West Rail line (now Tuen Ma line) in 2009.

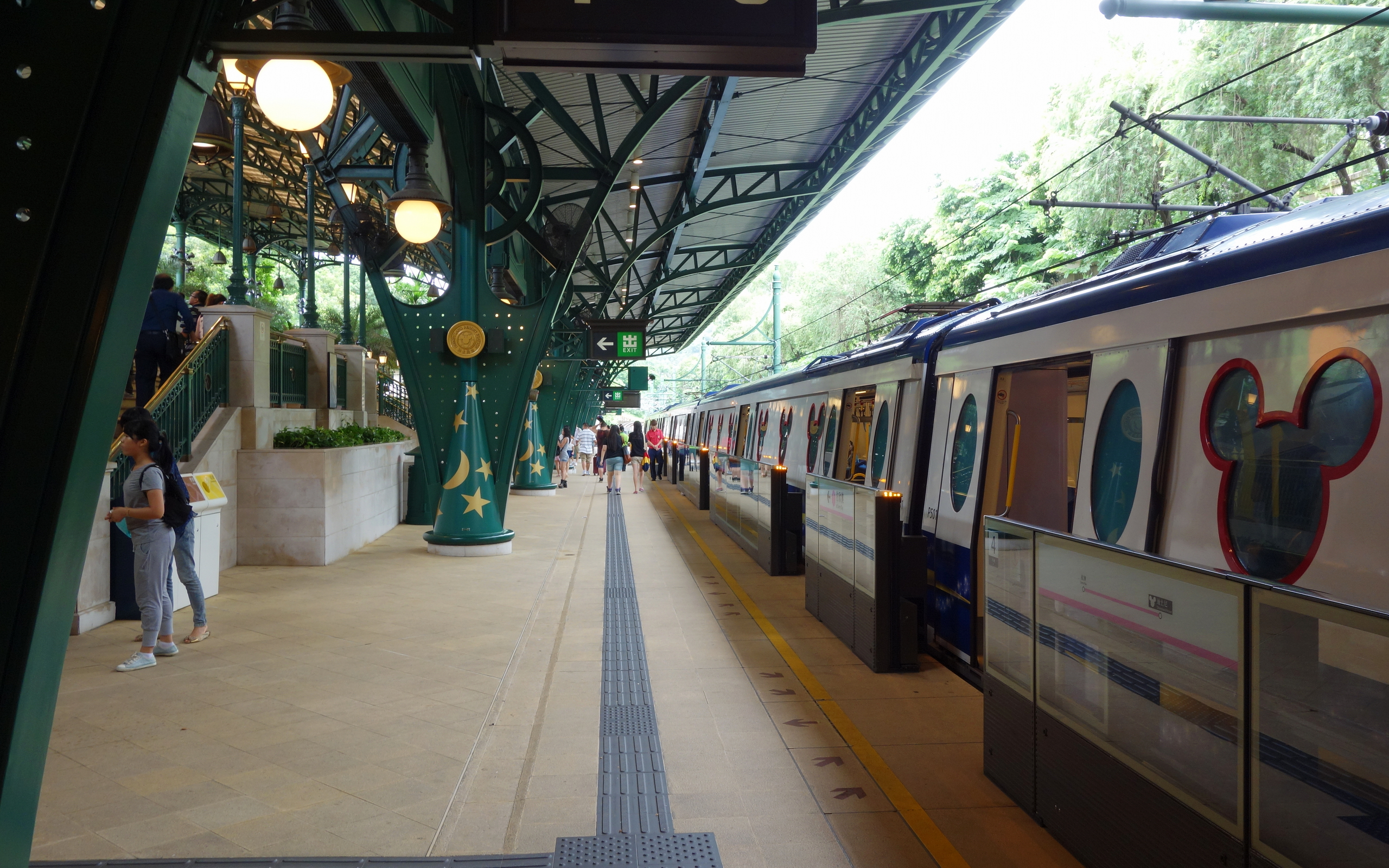
Disneyland Resort station platform became the second station in Hong Kong to have half-height platform-edge doors installed, after Sunny Bay.

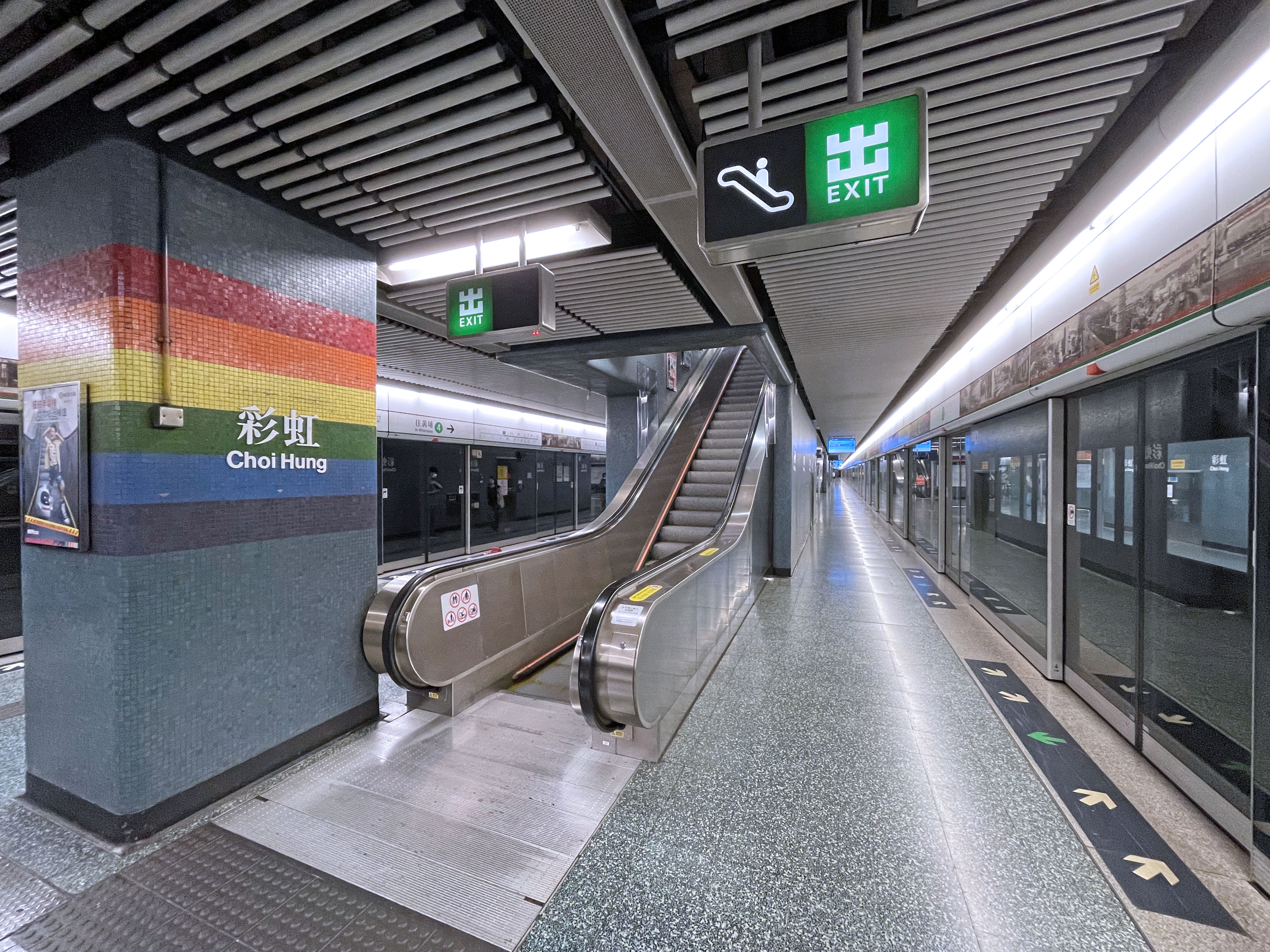
Choi Hung station platform was where the MTR first trialled PSDs in 1996. The current doors were installed in 2001.

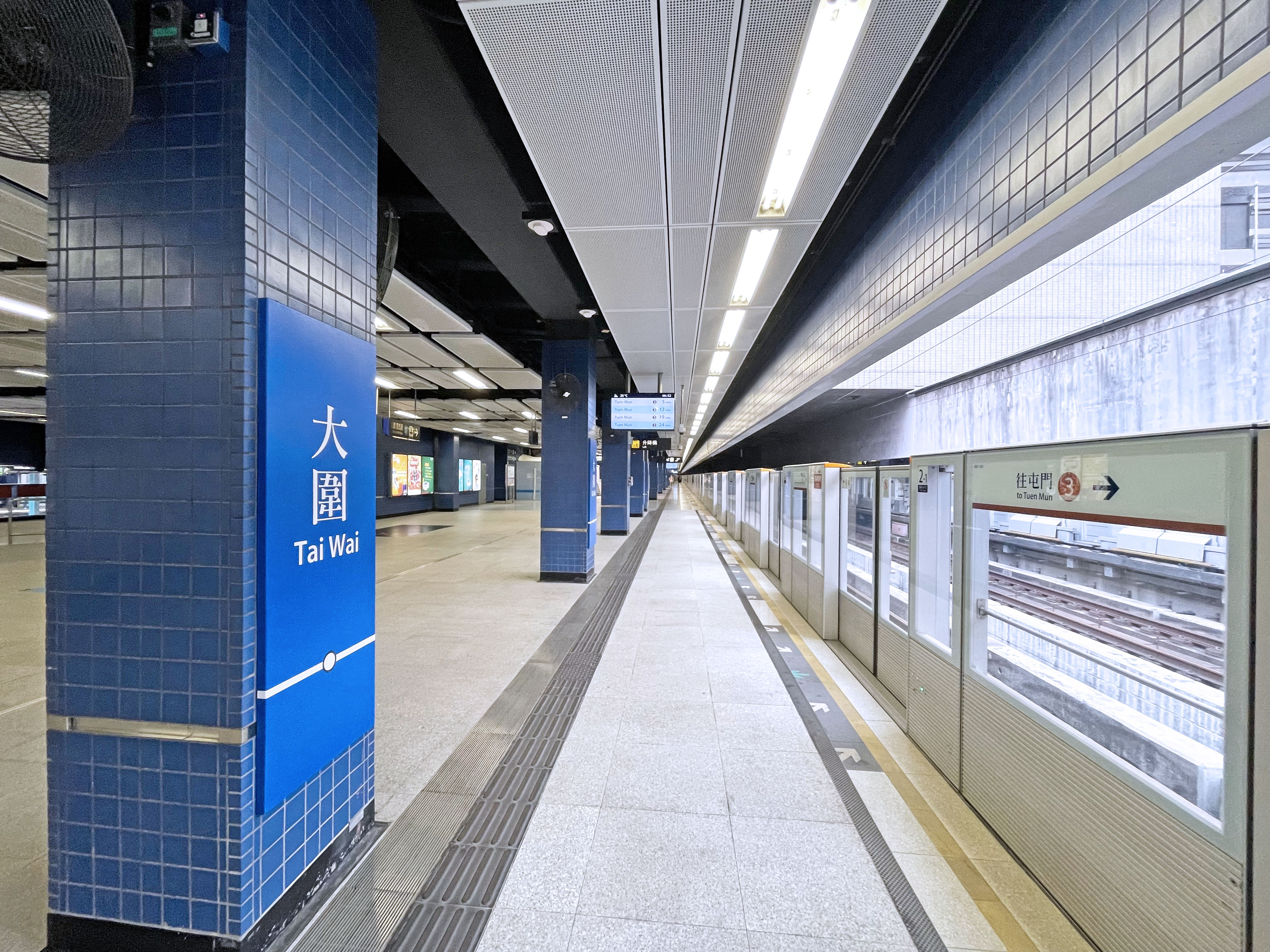
Platform 3 of Tai Wai station serving Tuen Mun-bound Tuen Ma Line trains.

The MTR Corporation had since mid-1996, been studying the feasibility of installing PSDs at the older stations to reduce suicides on the MTR and reduce air-conditioning costs. Platforms 2 and 3 of Choi Hung were chosen for the trial due to them being redundant platforms and receiving low numbers of passengers. Platform screen doors of two and a half cars' length were installed on each of the two platforms during the trial in 1996. As the Kwun Tong line trains consisted of eight cars, it was decided that the PSDs were to be removed to allow for smoother train operations.

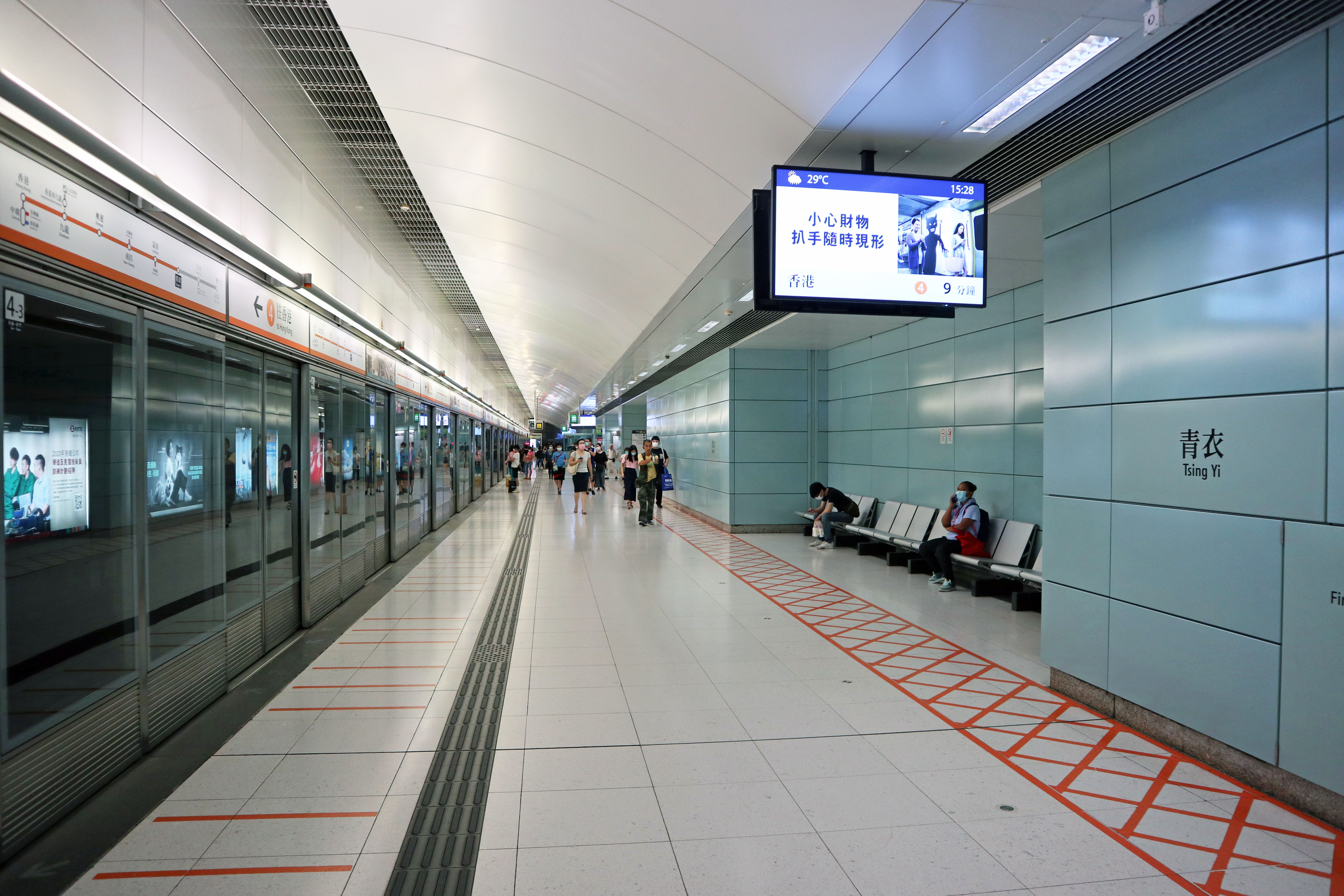
Tsing Yi station, along with the other stations of Tung Chung line and Airport Express, were the first stations to have PSDs in normal operation in Hong Kong.

With the opening of the Tung Chung line and Airport Express, Hong Kong had its first full-height PSDs fully operational in 1998.

The MTR decided in 1999 to undertake the PSD Retrofitting Programme at 74 platforms of 30 select underground stations on the Kwun Tong, Island, and Tsuen Wan lines. 2,960 pairs of PSDs were ordered from Gilgen Door Systems. Choi Hung became the first station to receive platform screen doors from this programme in August 2001. The Mass Transit Railway became the first metro system in the world to retrofit PSDs on a transit system already in operation. The program was completed in March 2006. All subsequent new stations or platforms installed with PSDs also used those manufactured by Gilgen Door Systems, until the cross-harbour extension of the East Rail Line which used platform screen doors manufactured by Fangda Group.

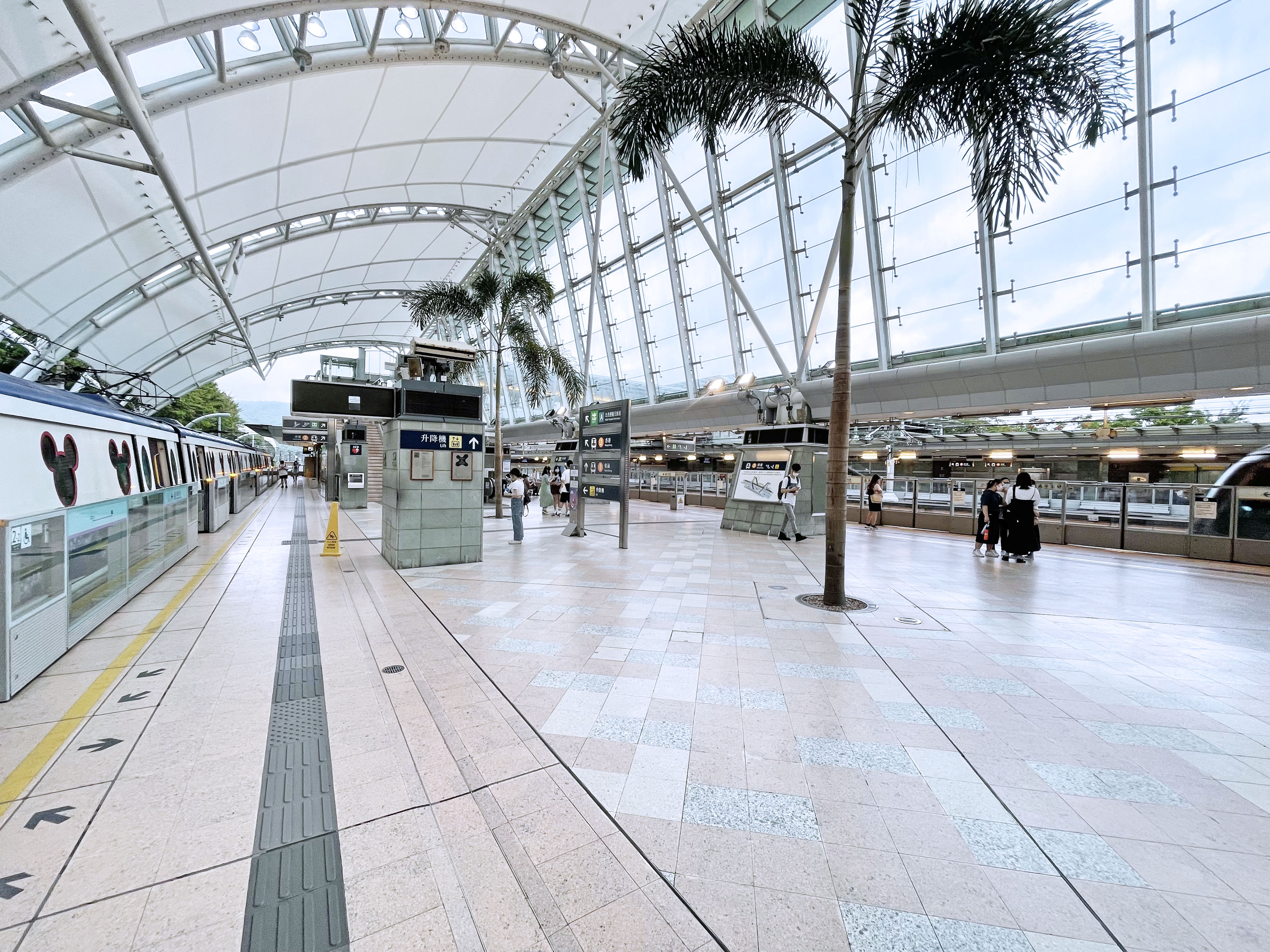
Sunny Bay station was the first station in Hong Kong to have PEDs.

The opening of the Sunny Bay and Disneyland Resort stations in 2005 also meant the first platform-edge doors entering operation for the MTR network. These doors are currently the lowest in the entire network of being at around 1.2 m (3 ft 11 in) high, compared to 1.55 m (5 ft 1 in) on the Kwun Tong, Tsuen Wan, Island and Tung Chung lines and 1.7 m (5 ft 7 in) on the Tuen Ma and South Island lines.

In 2006, the MTR began studying ways to introduce barriers at above-ground and at-grade stations, which was considered more complicated as those stations were naturally ventilated and the introduction of full-height platform screen doors would entail the installation of air conditioning systems. In 2008, the corporation decided to install automatic platform gates (APGs) at eight stations (the MTR Corporation Limited and KCR Corporation had been operationally merged since 2007, but KCR stations were not included in this study). The eight stations were retrofitted with APGs in 2011.

From July 2000 to December 2013, the MTR Corporation collected a surcharge of 10 cents from each Octopus-paying passenger to help pay for the installation of PSDs and APGs. Over HK$1.15 billion was collected in total.

Platform screen doors were also installed on all platforms of the West Rail line (now part of the Tuen Ma line), then built by the Kowloon-Canton Railway Corporation (KCRC) before the MTR–KCR merger. The Ma On Shan line did not have gates upon opening even though it was built at the same time as the West Rail; they were eventually added from 2014 to 2017 prior to the opening of the first phase of the Tuen Ma line on 14 February 2020.

The installation of platform screen doors in Hong Kong has been effective in reducing railway injuries and service disruptions.

The then-longest set of platform screen doors in the world can be found in East Tsim Sha Tsui station, where it first served the East Rail line when 12-car MLR trains were still in service. Following the completion of the Kowloon Southern Link and handing over of the station to the West Rail line (now part of the Tuen Ma line), the subsequent reduction of train length from 12 to 7 cars caused many of the screen doors to be put out of service, although the trains were lengthened to eight cars in May 2018.

The West Rail line (now part of Tuen Ma line), had all stations installed with APGs, and another constituent line of the Tuen Ma line, the Ma On Shan line, had its final APG installed enter service on 20 December 2017.

The last non-tram/light rail stations in Hong Kong without platform screen doors or gates are all on the East Rail line, a former KCR line not part of the MTR APG retrofitting programmes. The KCR Corporation found it difficult to install APGs because of the wide curves of the platforms and large gaps of their platforms, especially in University, Lo Wu, and Mong Kok East station. However, these remaining thirteen stations are all being retrofitted by Kaba as part of the Sha Tin to Central Link project. The APGs are estimated to be at around 1.8 m (5 ft 11 in) high. Adding APGs to the East Rail Line platforms requires platform strengthening with rebars and brackets as the gates, combined with heavy winds, can greatly increase structural load on the platform structure. Also extensive waterproofing work is needed as many of these platforms are directly exposed to the elements.

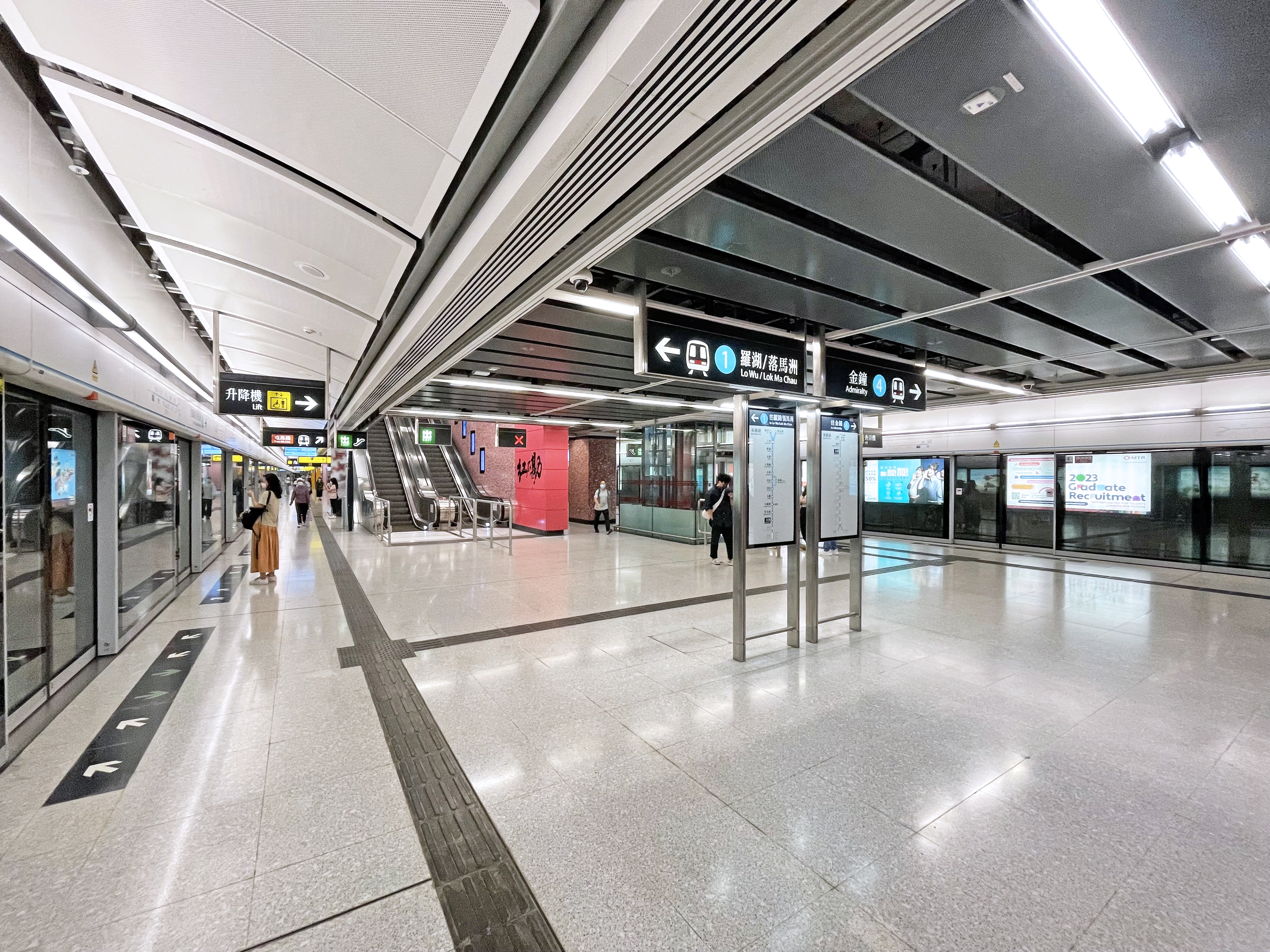
East Rail line platforms of Hung Hom station

The first three stations on the East Rail Line to receive platform screen doors were Admiralty, Exhibition Centre and Hung Hom. Automatic platform gates have also been installed as part of retrofitting in the remaining stations, which finished earlier than the projected end of 2025 target, at 4 June 2025. The platform screen doors presently in service in the MTR have been supplied by the Swiss manufacturer Kaba Gilgen, the Japanese Nabtesco Corporation (under the Nabco brand), the French Faiveley Transport and Shenzhen Fangda Automatic System.

Apart from the MTR, all stations on the Hong Kong International Airport Automated People Mover are equipped with platform screen doors made from Westinghouse (for Phase 1) and Panasonic (for Midfield Extension). The platforms for the shuttle bus service between the North Satellite Concourse and the East Hall of Terminal One at the HKIA, Chek Lap Kok, the New Territories and the bus platforms in Yue Man Square in Kwun Tong, New Kowloon are also retrofitted with PSDs. After it reopened on 27 August 2022, the Peak Tram was retrofitted with platform edge doors on the boarding side of the terminus stations.

=== India ===
On the Delhi Metro, all stations on the Delhi Airport Metro Express line, which links to Indira Gandhi International Airport have been equipped with full-height platform screen doors since 2011 and the six busiest stations on the Yellow Line have also been equipped with half height platform gates. Automatic platform gates on all the stations of the Pink, Magenta Line.

Platform screen doors are also used in all underground stations of the Chennai Metro.

In Kolkata Metro, all elevated and underground stations of Green Line have platform screen doors. They are planned to be introduced in underground stations of Purple Line, Yellow Line and Orange Line. There are also plans to install platform screen doors in Blue Line.

All the stations of under-construction Hyderabad Airport Express Metro will have a provision of half-height platform screen doors (PSD) for improved passenger safety. On the Namma Metro in Bangalore, platform doors will be installed for its phase II operations and is expected to be completed by 2019. The Electronic City metro station in southern Bengaluru, on the Yellow Line, will be the first Namma Metro station to have platform screen doors installed.

On the Mumbai Metro, all lines being made by MMRDA, that is, Line 2A, The Yellow Line, Line 7A, The Red Line, will have half-height platform screen doors on all elevated stations and full-height platform screen doors in the underground stations, as the trains used in these lines have a GoA level 4, and also to reduce risk of passenger deaths by overcrowding. Line 3, The Aqua line, will have full-height platform screen doors, as the line is fully underground, and like the MMRDA lines above, will have GoA level 4 (Unattended train operation).

All underground stations on the Pune Metro will have platform screen doors.

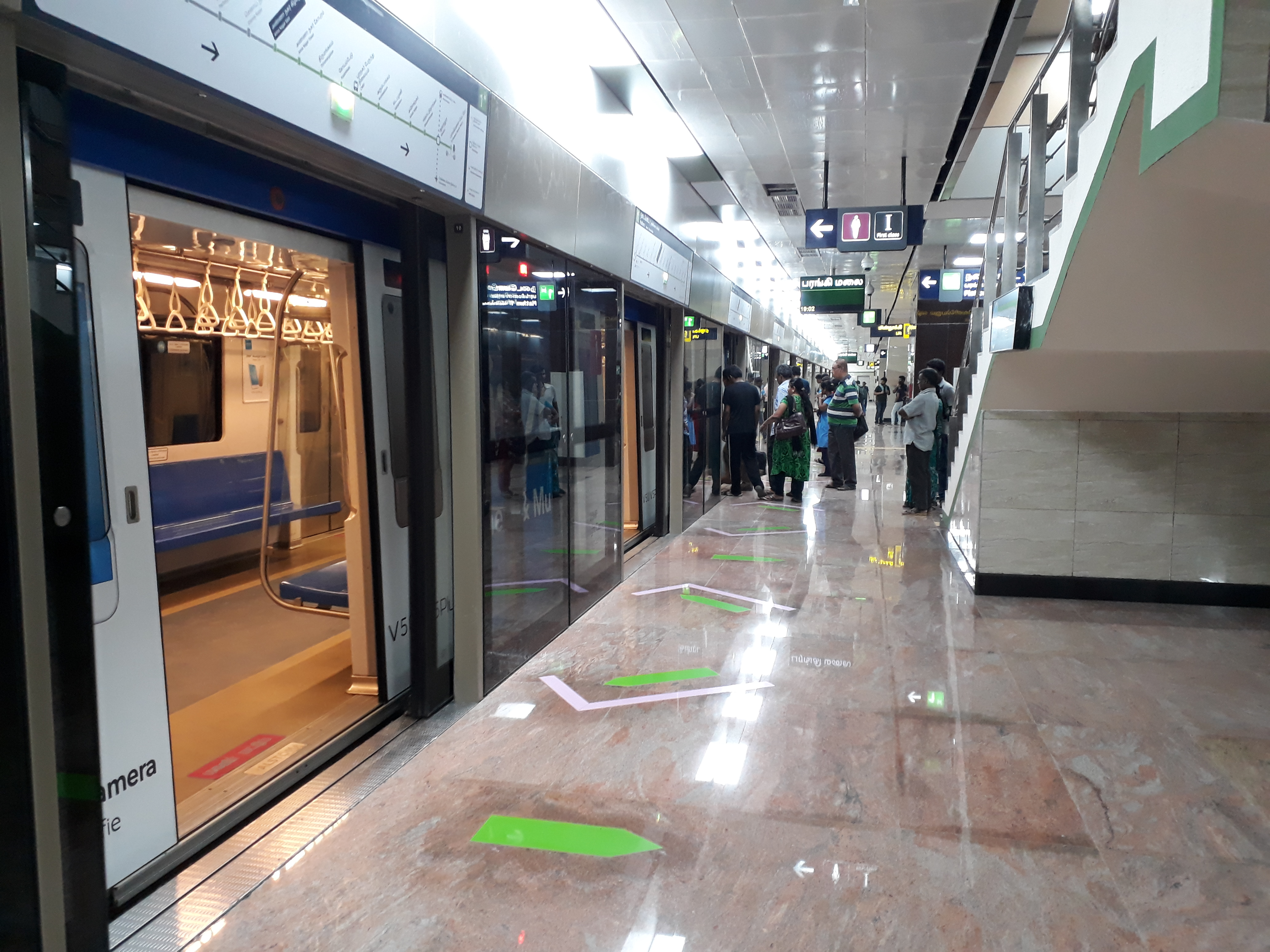
Full-height platform screen doors installed in Chennai Metro's underground stations

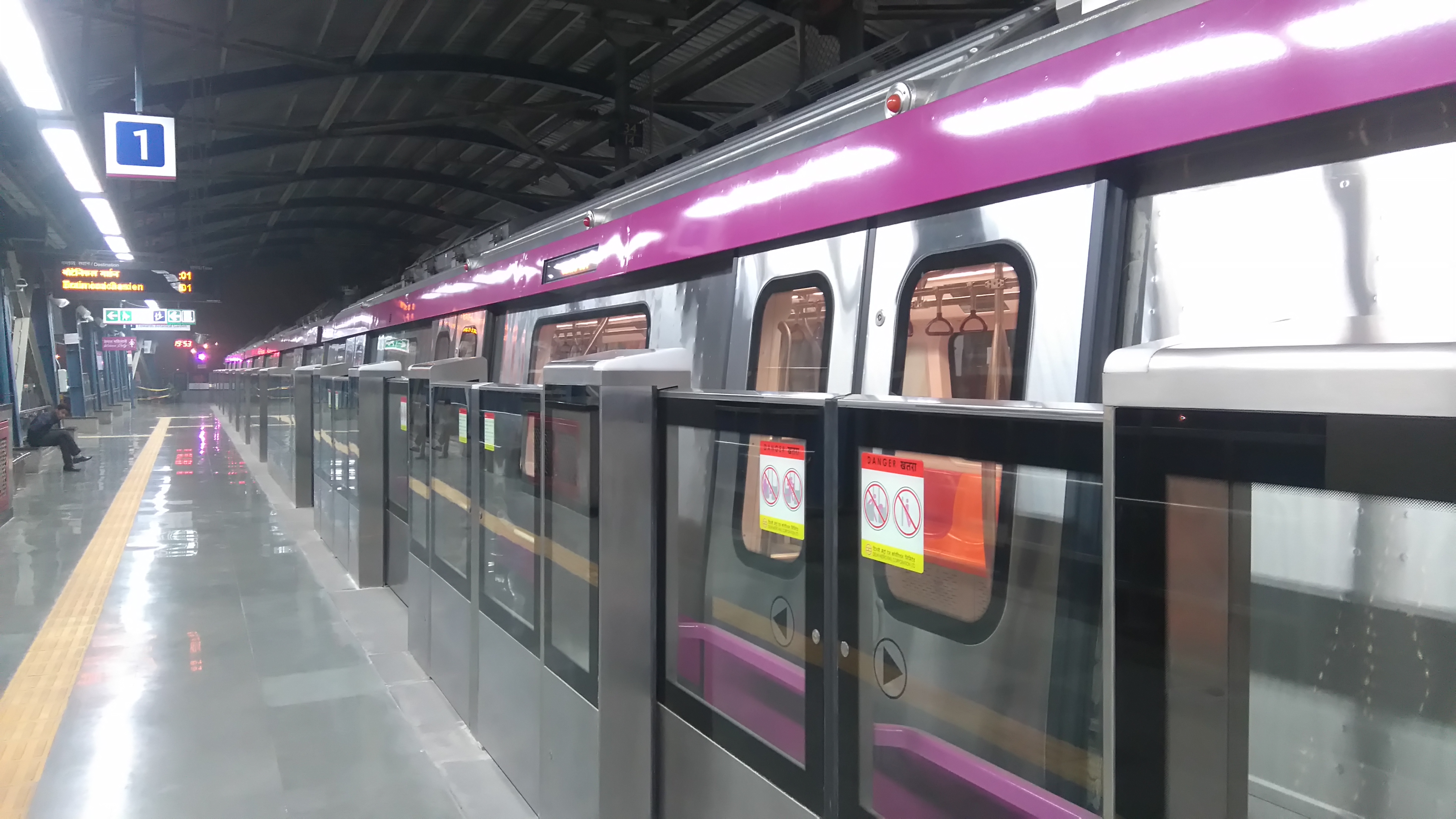
Half-height automatic platform doors in Okhla Bird Sanctuary Station of the Delhi Metro's Magenta Line

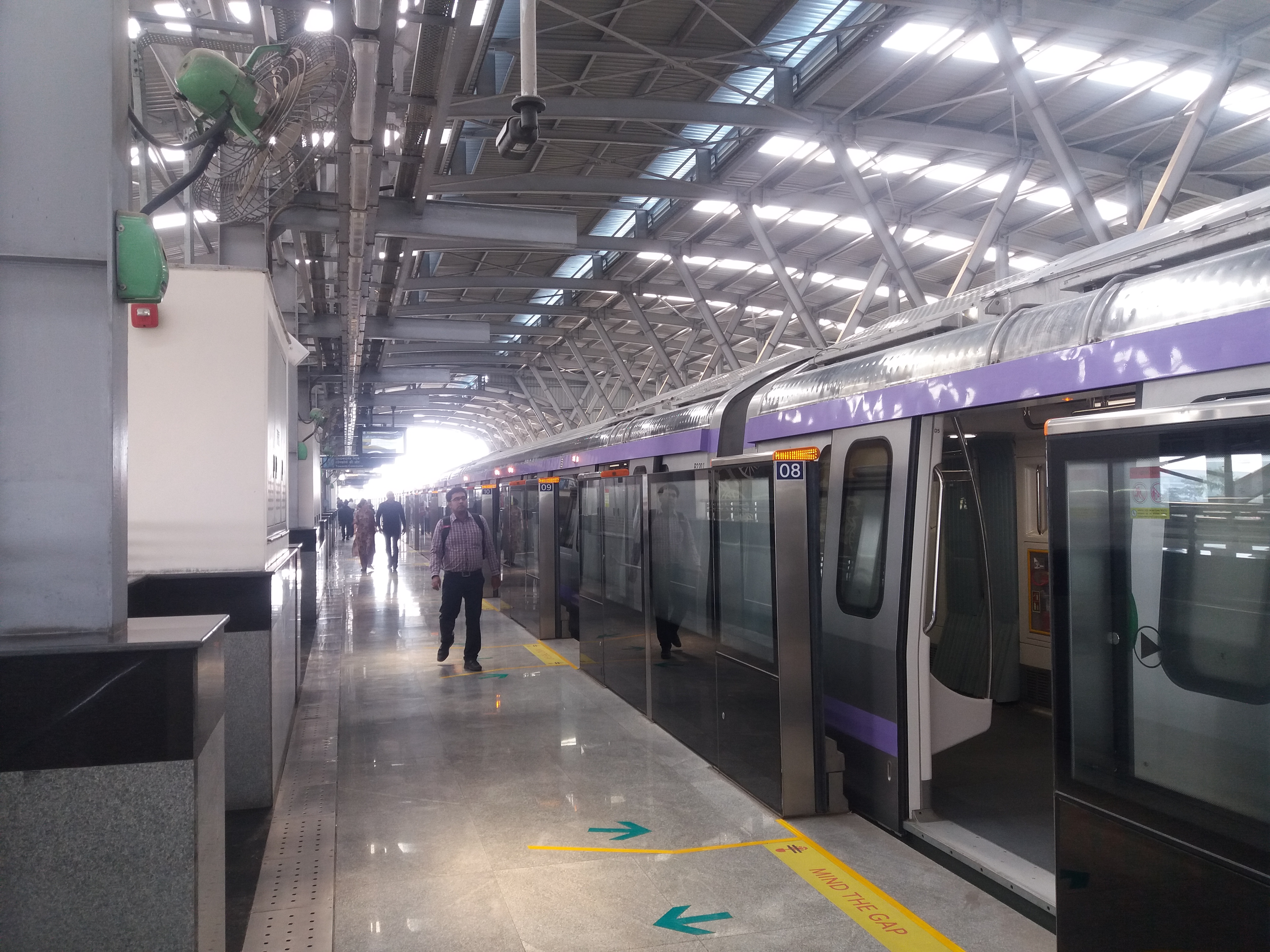
Half-height platform doors in Kolkata Metro's Salt Lake Stadium metro station

=== Indonesia ===
The Soekarno–Hatta Airport Skytrain, opened in 2017, has full-height platform screen doors. The Jakarta MRT, opened in 2019, has full-height PSDs in underground stations and half-height PSDs in elevated stations. The Jakarta LRT, opened in 2019, has half-height PSDs. The Greater Jakarta LRT, which opened in 2023, has half-height platform screen doors. PSDs are used in some TransJakarta bus stops, but they are often broken and have to be turned off.

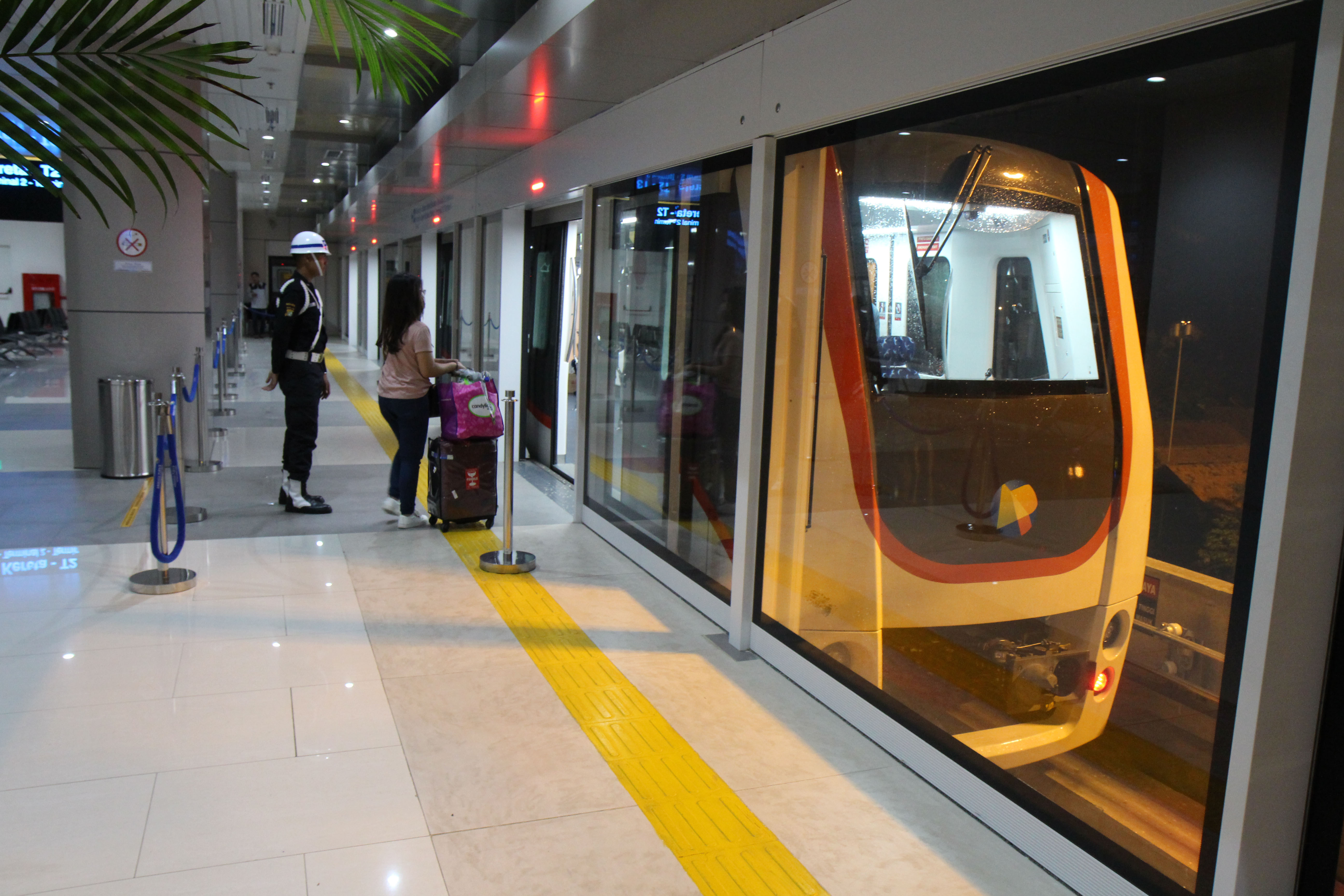
Platform screen doors at one of SHIA Skytrain station

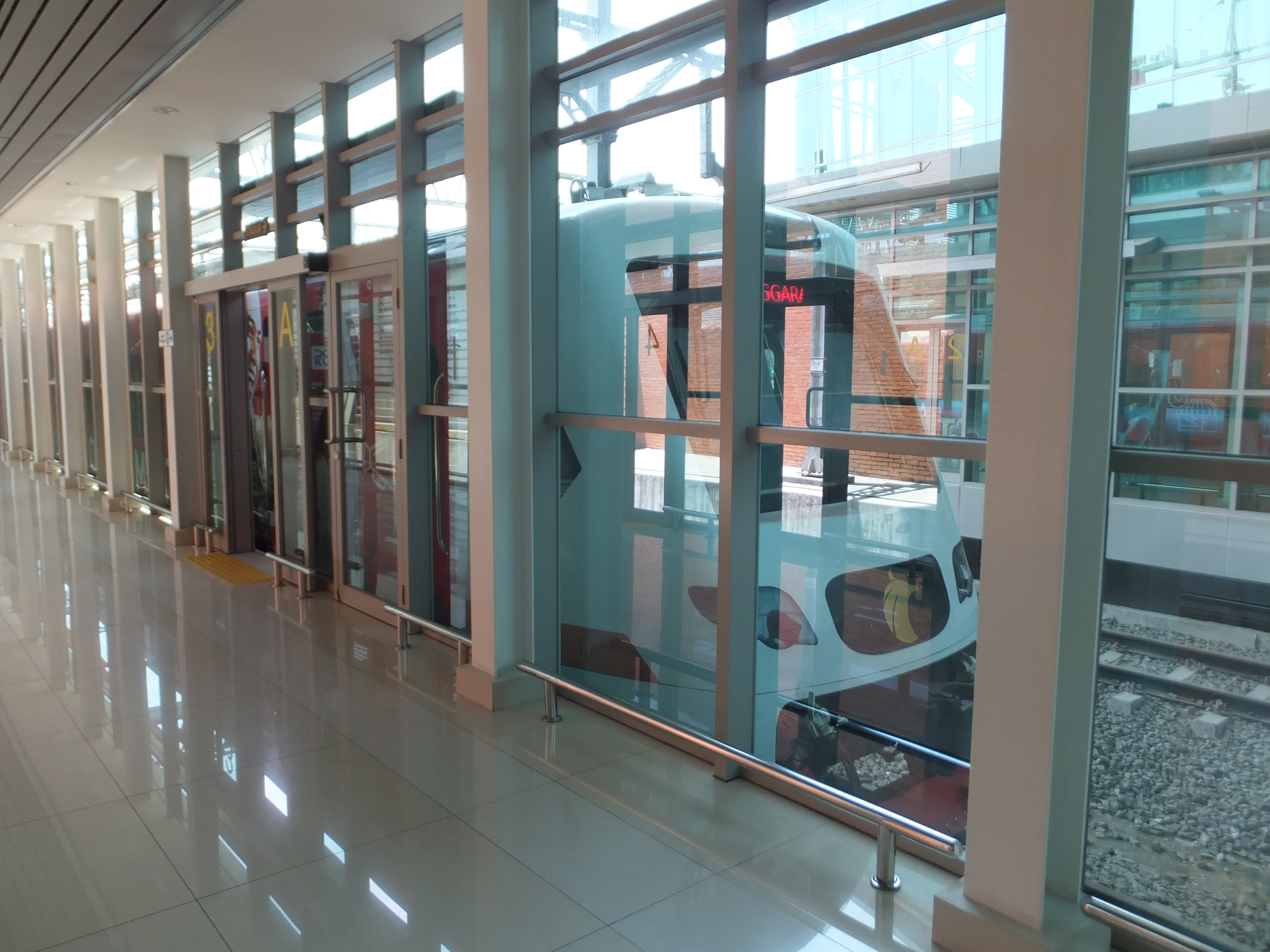
Platform screen doors at SHIA railway station

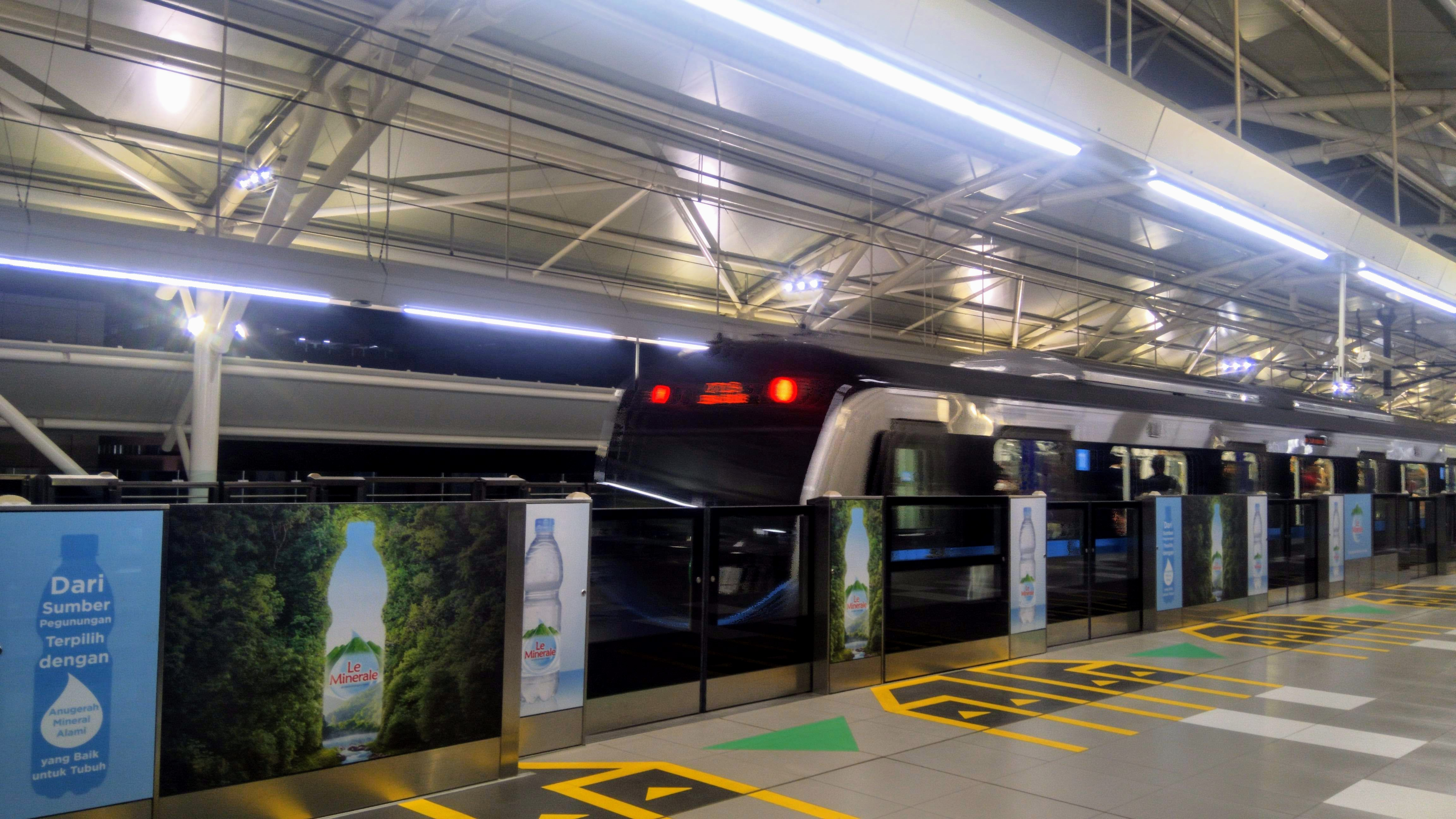
Half-height doors at ASEAN MRT station

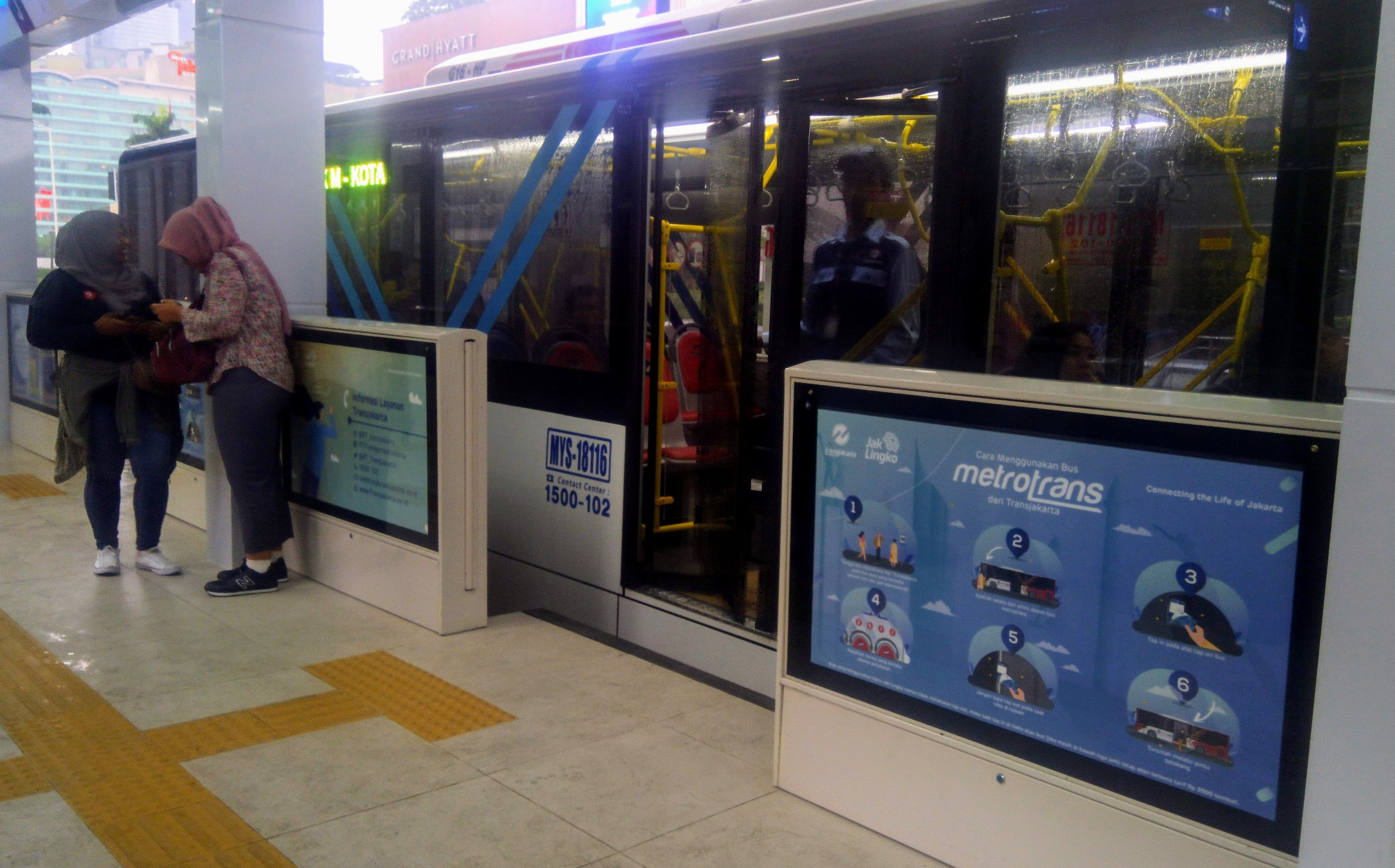
Half-height doors at TransJakarta Bundaran HI station

=== Ireland ===
The future Dublin MetroLink will have platform screen doors.

=== Israel ===
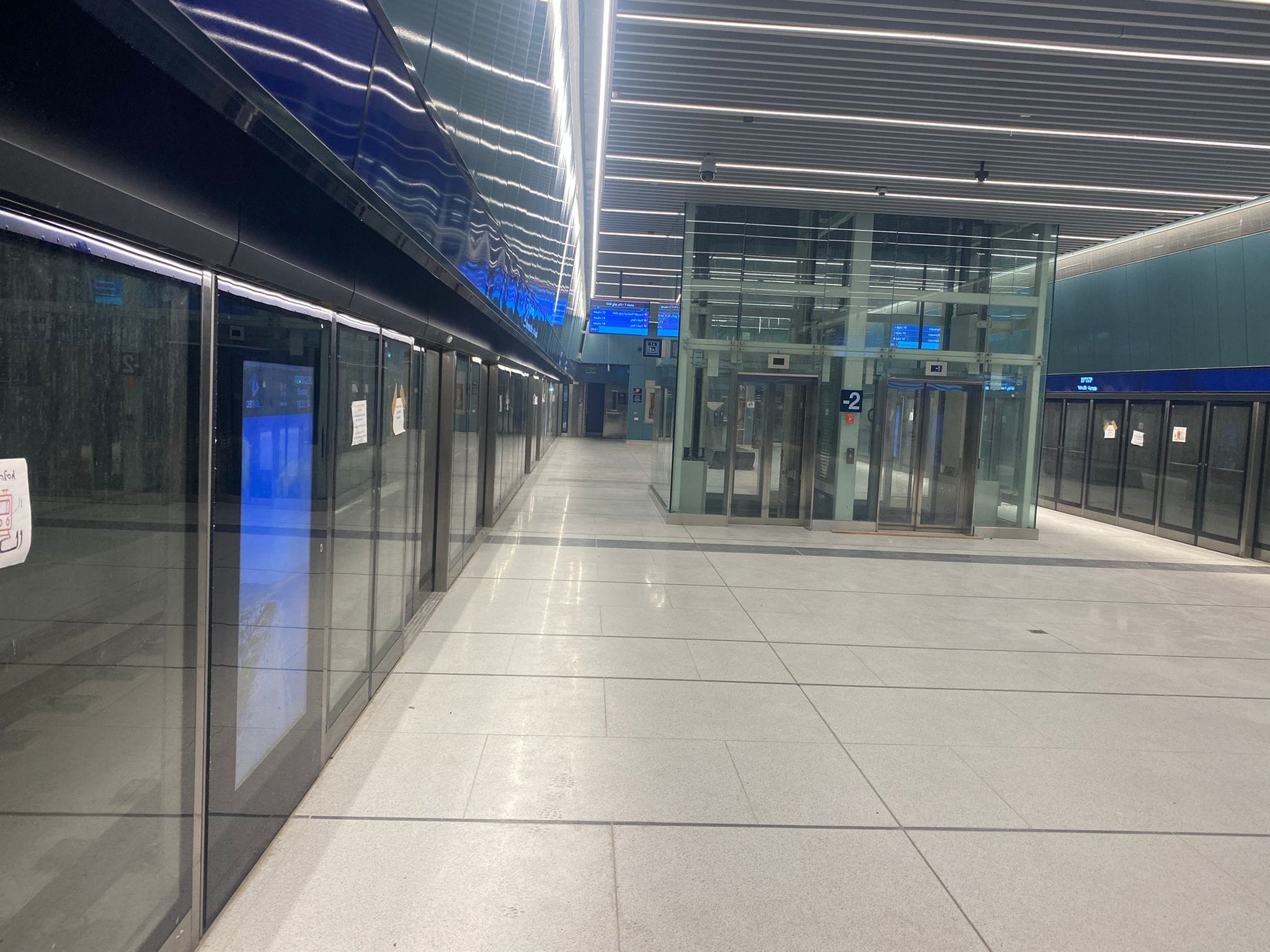
Full-height doors at the Yehudit station on Tel Aviv Light Rail

The underground stations on the Red Line on the Tel Aviv Light Rail have full height platform screen doors, with the exception of the Elifelet, Shenkar and Kiryat Arye stations which have half-height Platform screen doors.

=== Italy ===
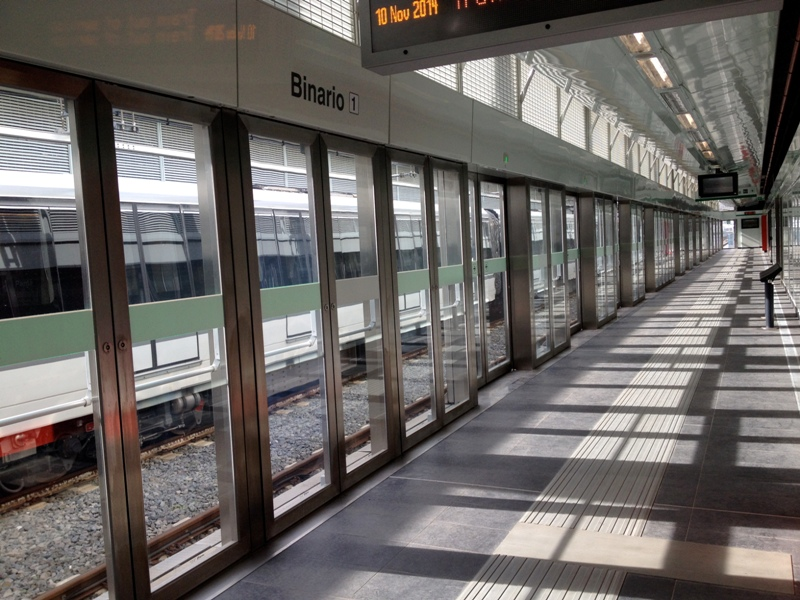
Platform screen doors at the Monte Compatri-Pantano station on Rome Metro's Line C

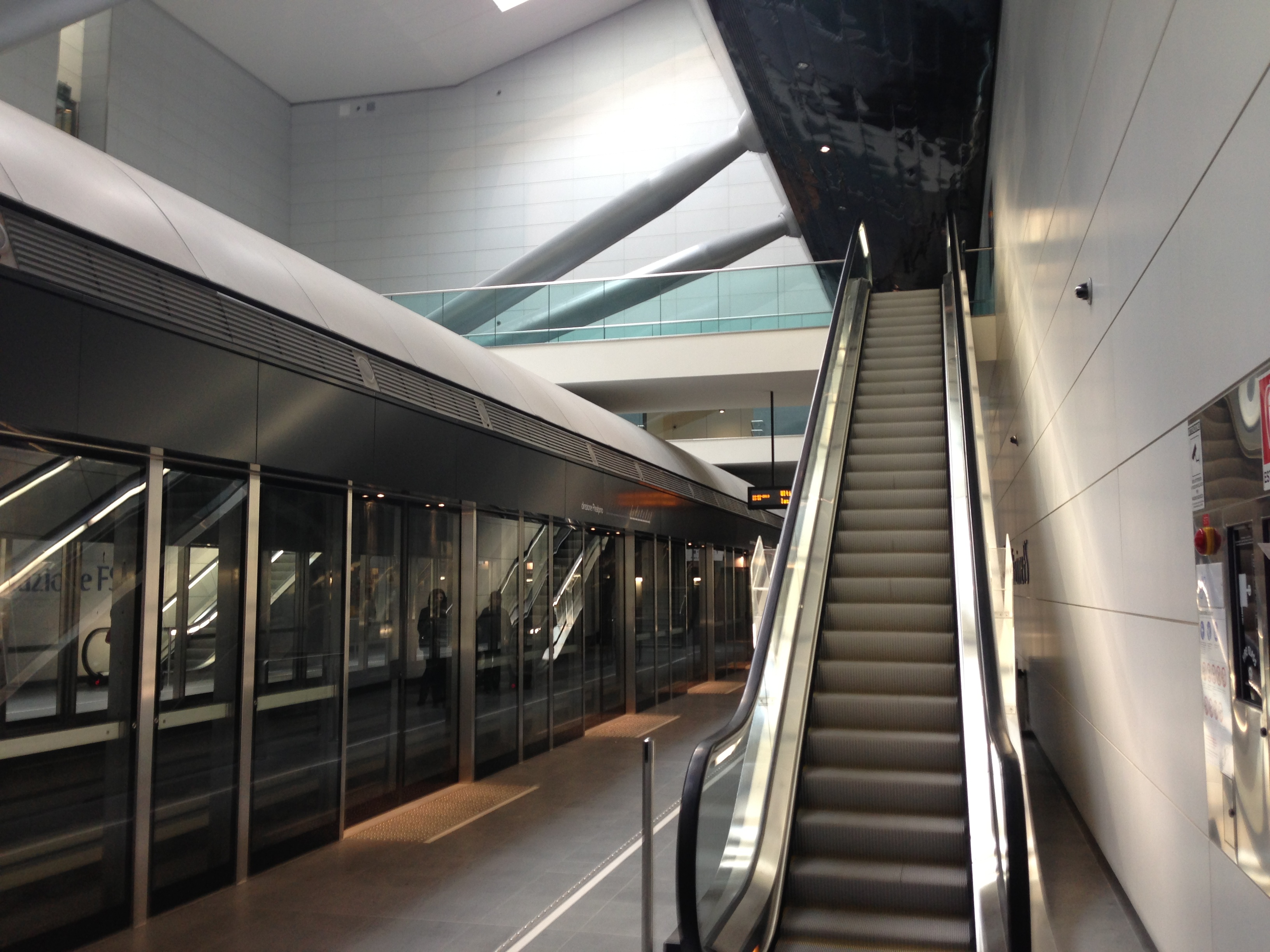
Stazione FS station In Brescia Metro

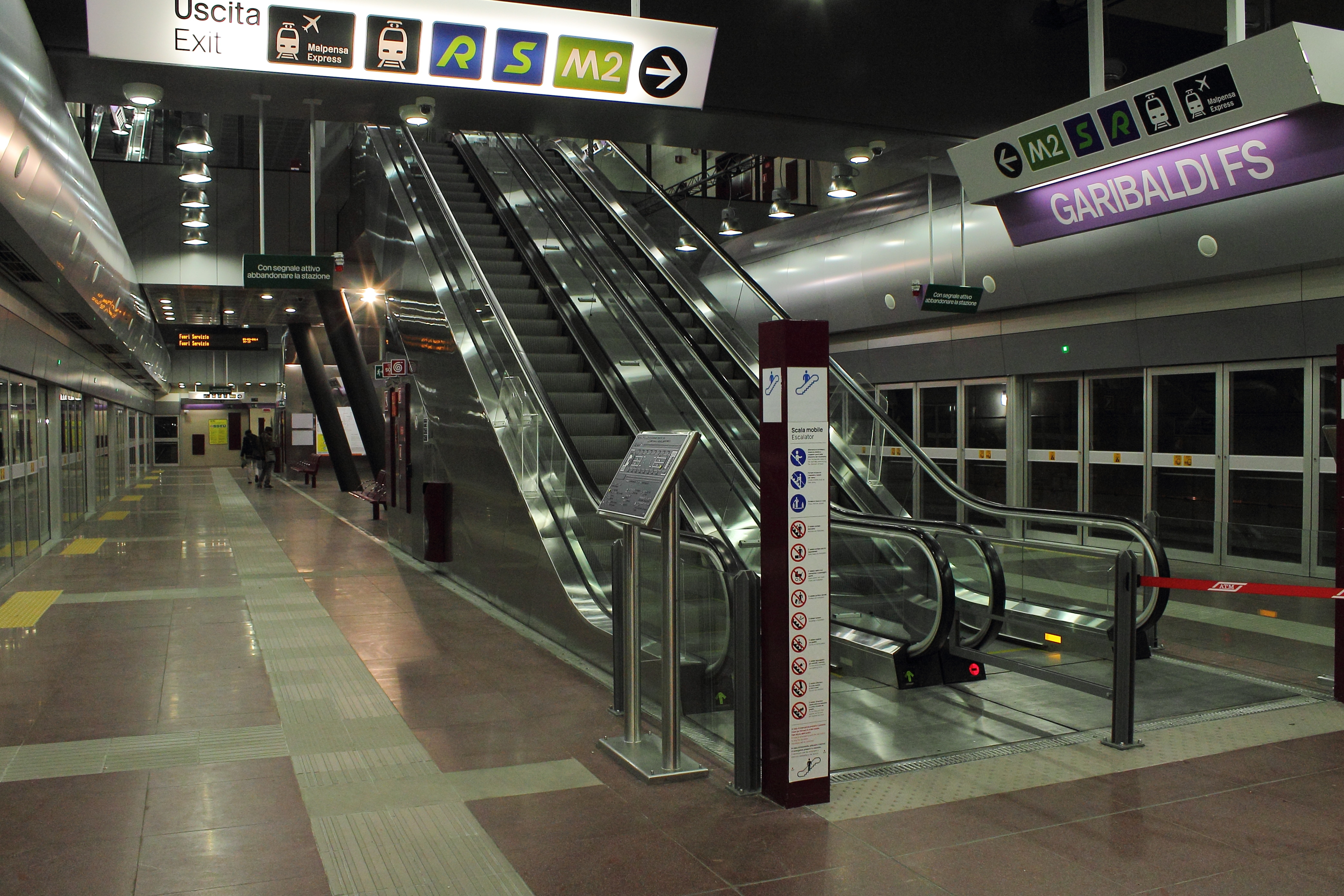
Garibaldi FS In Milan Metro Line 5

Platform screen doors are used in most newly built rapid transit lines and systems of new construction in Italy. PSDs are present on Turin Metro, the Venice People Mover, the Perugia Minimetrò, the Brescia Metro, Line 4 and Line 5 of the Milan Metro, Marconi Express Bologna, Pisa Mover (linking Pisa airport and Pisa Centrale station) and Line C of the Rome Metro.

=== Japan ===
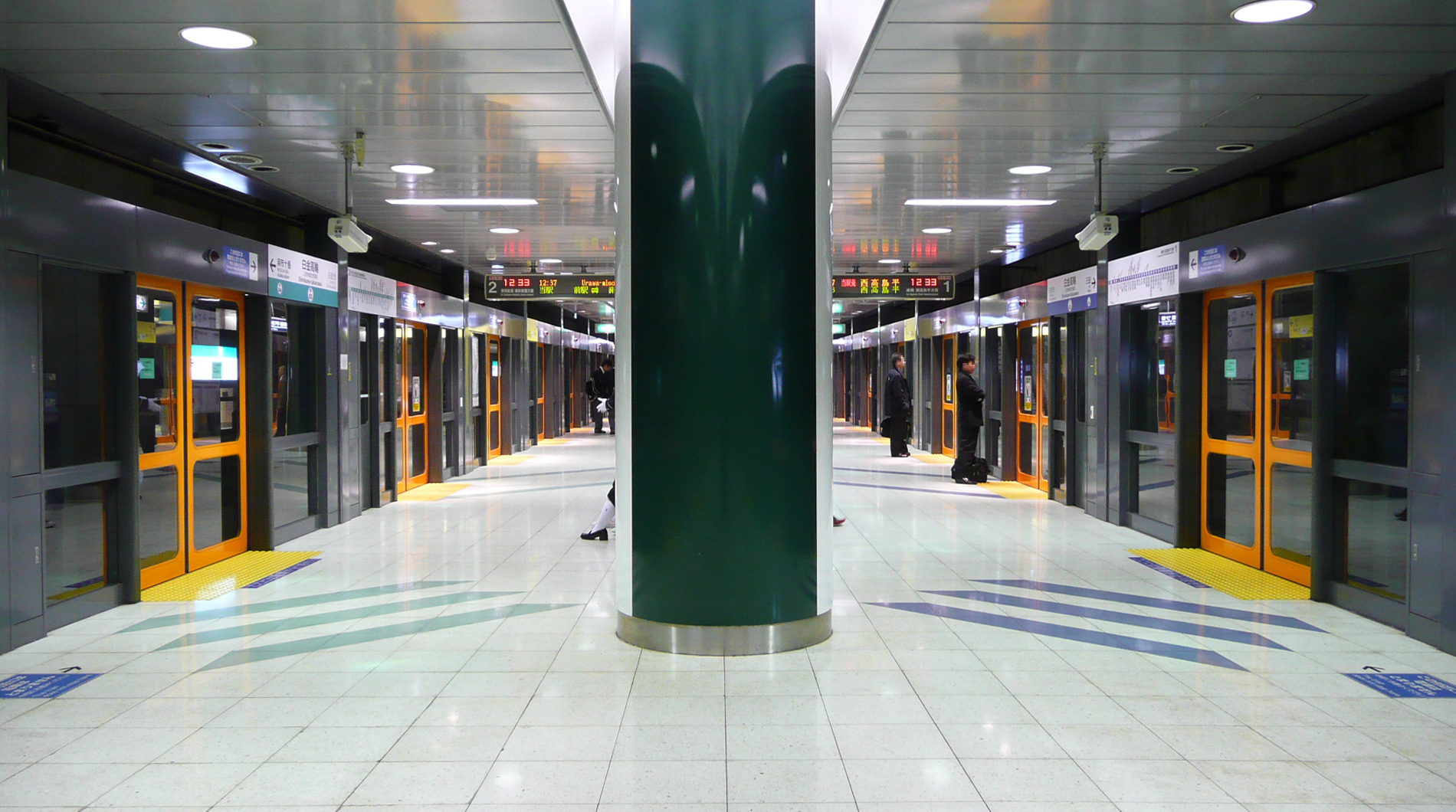
Full-height doors on Tokyo Metro Namboku Line and Toei Mita Line

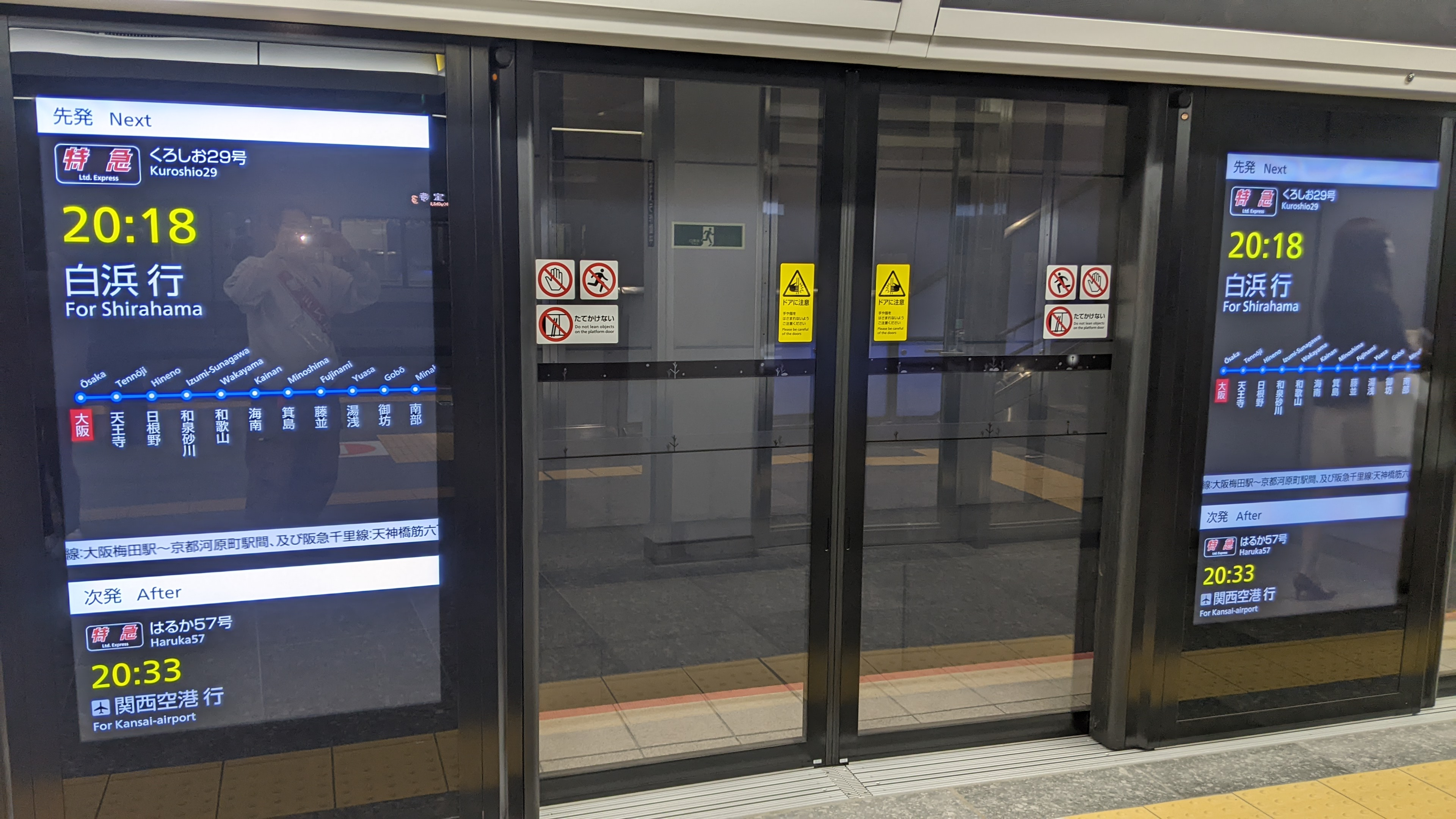
Platform screen doors at the Ōsaka Station

The Tokyo Metro and Toei Subway began using barriers with the 1991 opening of the Namboku Line (which has full-height platform screen doors), and subsequently installed automatic platform gates on the Mita, Marunouchi, and Fukutoshin lines. Some railway lines, including the subway systems in Sapporo, Sendai, Nagoya, Osaka, Kyoto, and Fukuoka, also utilize barriers to some extent.

In August 2012, the Japanese government announced plans to install barriers at stations used by 100,000 or more people per day, and the Ministry of Land, Infrastructure, Transport and Tourism allotted 36 million yen ($470,800) for research and development of the system the 2011-2012 fiscal year. A difficulty was the fact that some stations are used by different types of trains with different designs, making barrier design a challenge.

As of November 2012, only 34 of 235 stations with over 100,000 users per day were able to implement the plan. The ministry stated that 539 of approximately 9,500 train stations across Japan have barriers. Of the Tokyo Metro stations, 78 of 179 have some type of platform barrier.

In 2018, automatic platform gates were installed on the Sōbu Rapid Line platforms at Shin-Koiwa. As the line's trains are 300 m (980 ft) long, the set of platform gates broke the world record for the longest platform doors at East Tsim Sha Tsui station in Hong Kong.

In March 2023, the underground facilities at Osaka Station (nicknamed Ume-kita during planning and construction) opened. The platforms for the Haruka and Kuroshio limited express services have movable full-screen automated platform doors that cover the entire platform from the edge to the ceiling and such doors are the first of its kind.

=== Kazakhstan ===
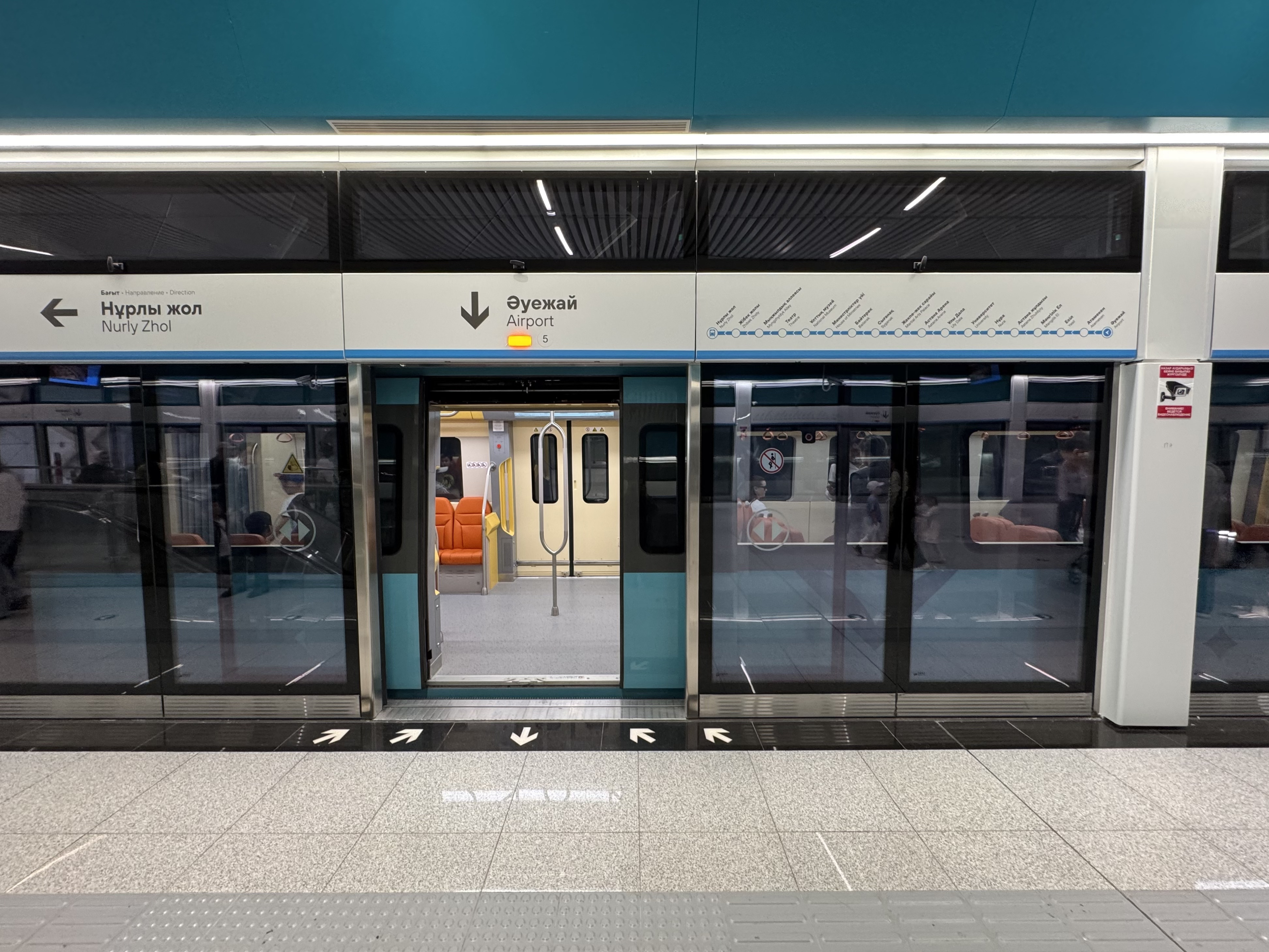
Full-height doors at the Airport Station of the Astana LRT

Full-height platform screen doors are in use in all stations of the Astana Light Metro, an automated rapid transit system that opened in 2026.

=== Malaysia ===
Platform screen doors (PSD) are installed at all underground Kelana Jaya Line stations, from Ampang Park to Masjid Jamek, Kajang Line, from Muzium Negara to Maluri stations and Putrajaya Line, from Sentul Barat to Chan Sow Lin. The automated announcement message reading "For safety reasons, please stand behind the yellow line" in both English and Malay languages are also heard before the train arrived at all stations.

There are also platform screen doors (PSD) on the KLIA Ekspres at Kuala Lumpur Sentral and KLIA stations. Both stations at KLIA Aerotrain also have platform screen doors.

The automatic platform gates (APG) also have been installed in all elevated and subsurface stations of the Kajang Line, KL Monorail and Putrajaya Line.

In the future, all LRT and MRT station platforms will get either platform screen doors or automated platform gates.

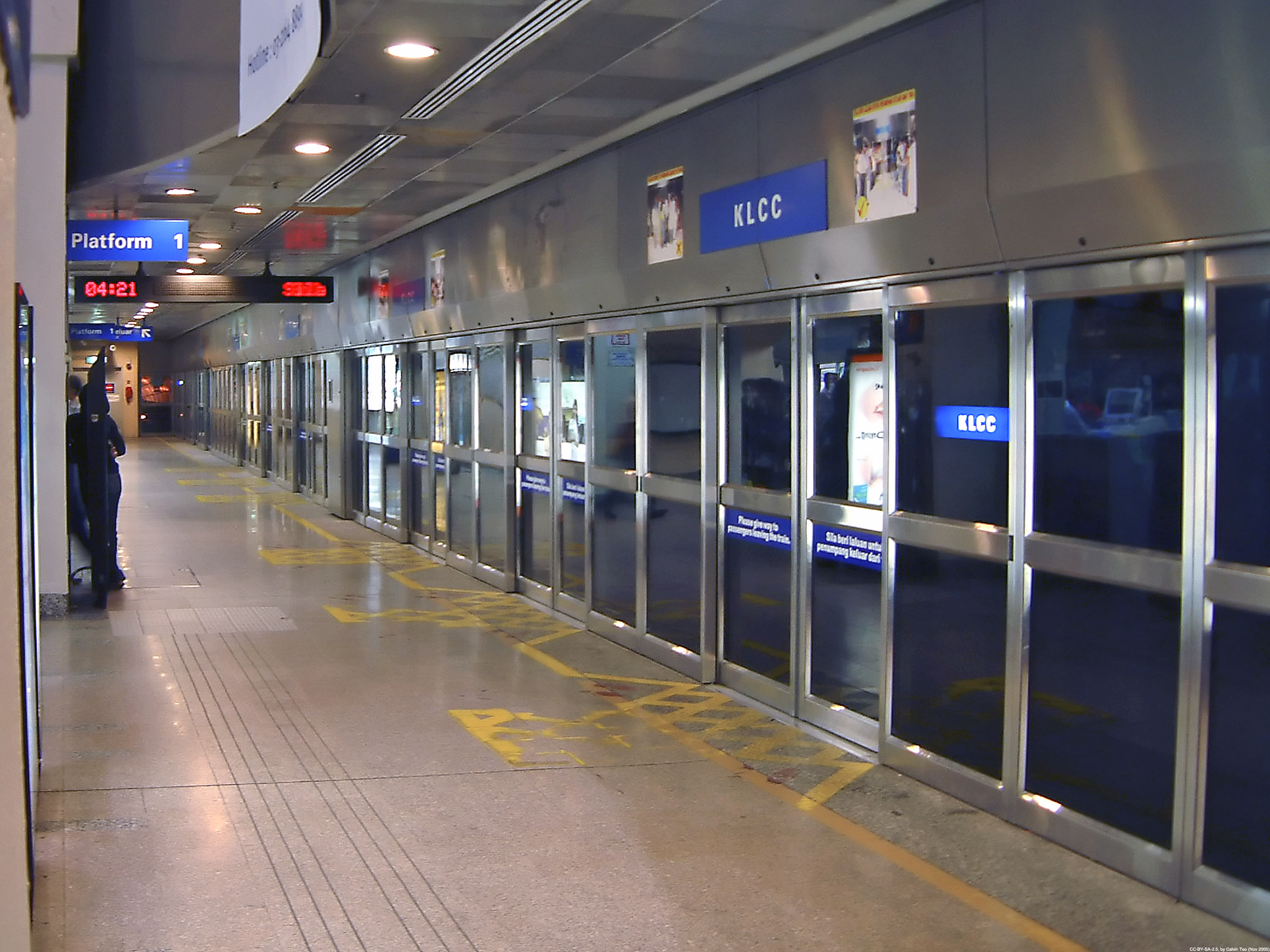
PSD at KLCC station on Kelana Jaya Line

PSD at Tun Razak Exchange station on Putrajaya Line

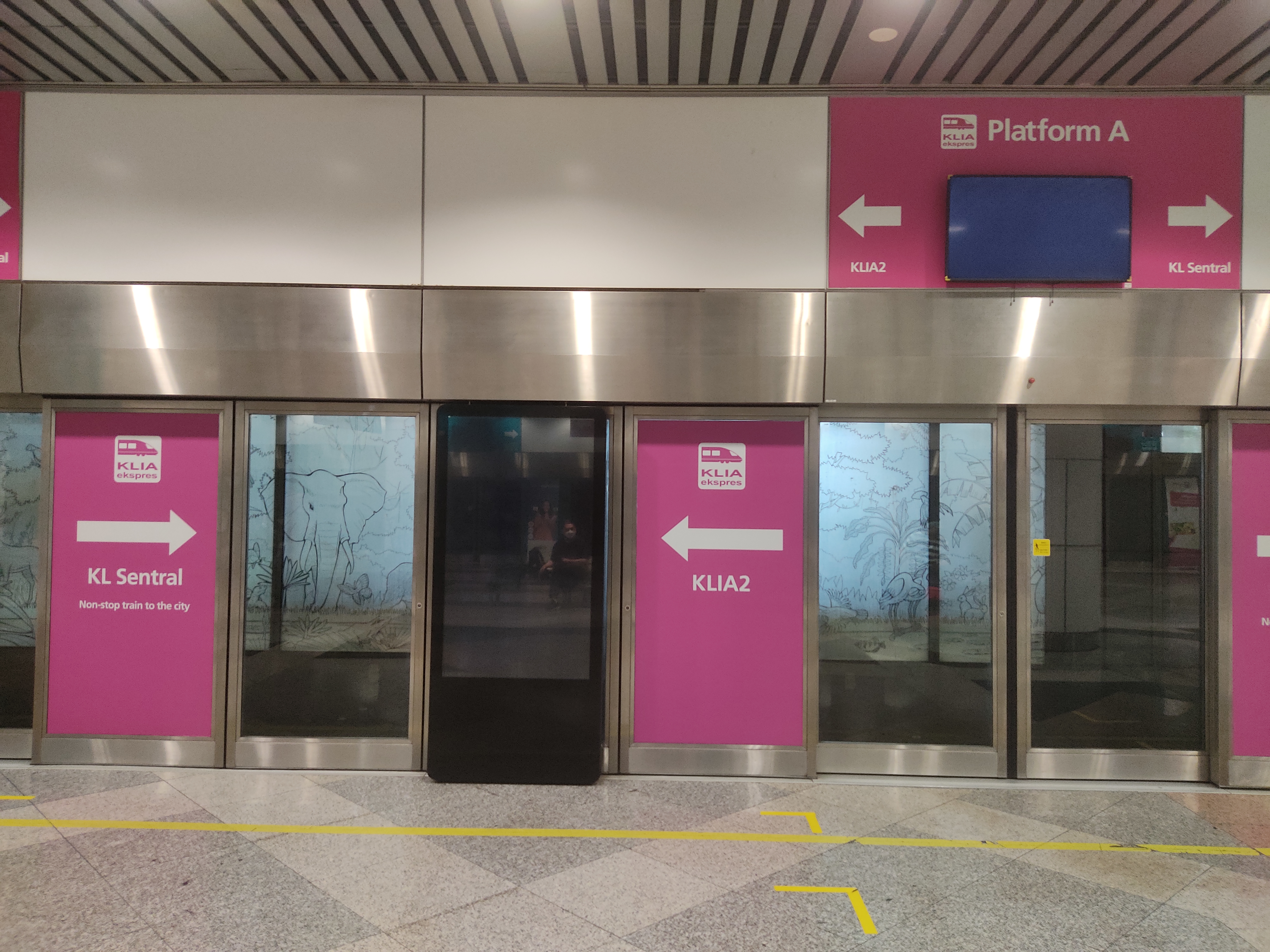
PSD at KLIA T1 station on KLIA Ekspres

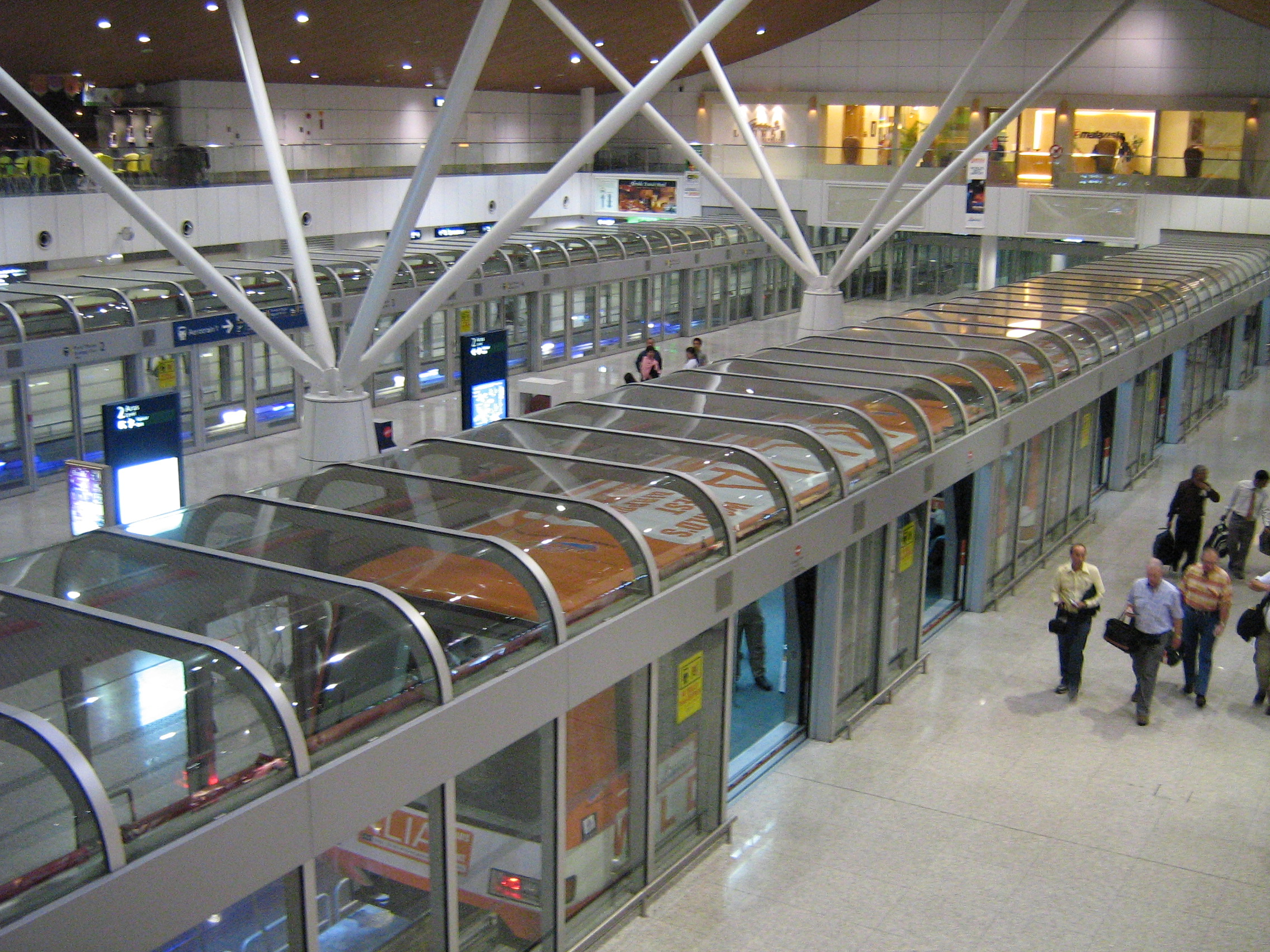
PSD at KLIA Satellite A Building on KLIA Aerotrain

APG at Semantan station on Kajang Line

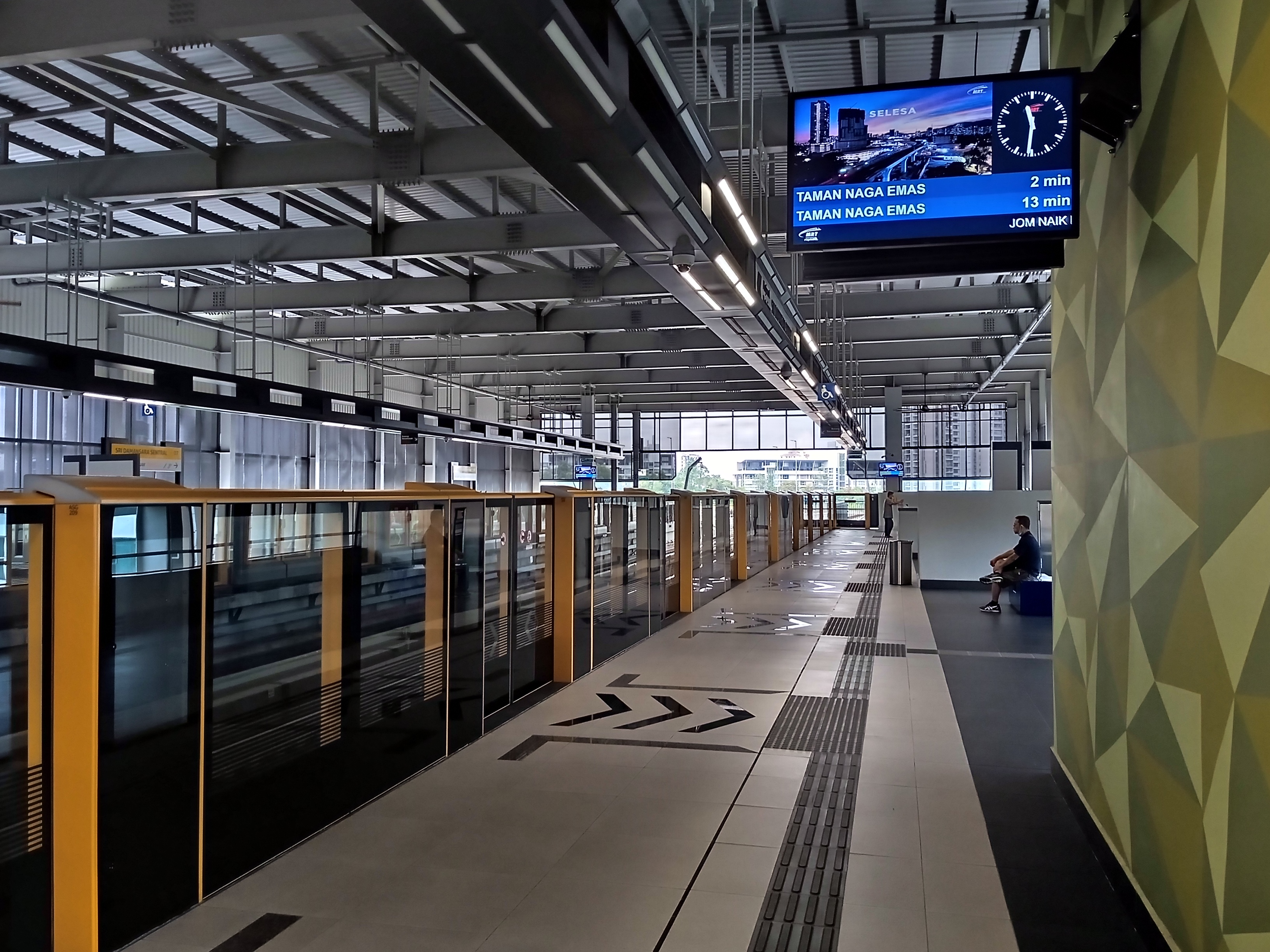
APG at Sri Damansara Sentral station on Putrajaya Line

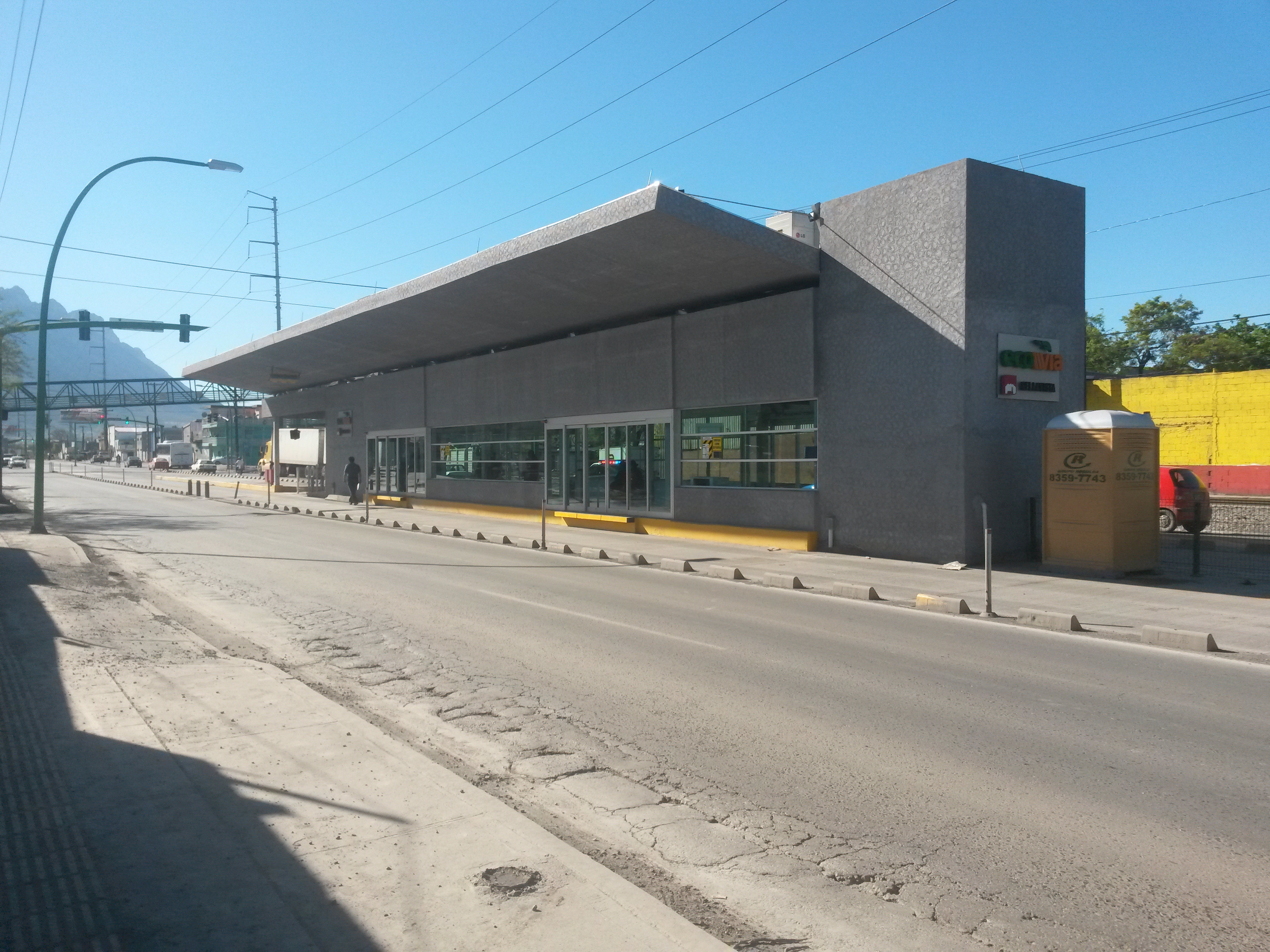
Platform screen doors on the Ecovía BRT system in Monterrey

=== Mexico ===
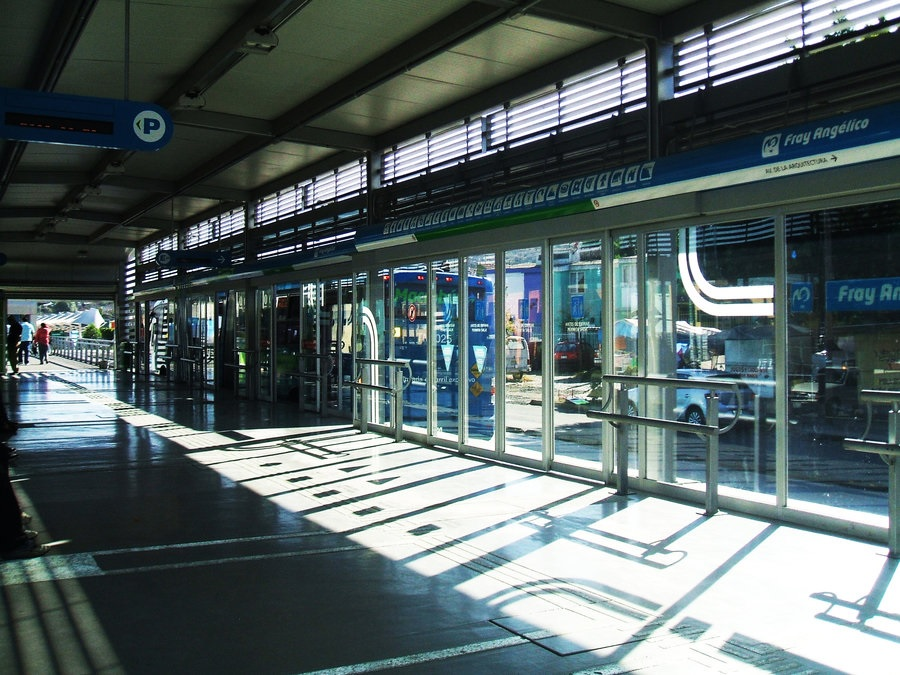
Platform screen doors at a Guadalajara Macrobús station

Platform screen doors are present at various bus rapid transit systems in Mexico, such as at the stations of the Guadalajara Macrobús and the Ecovía system of Monterrey. Platform screen doors can be seen as well on the Aerotrén, an airport people mover at Mexico City International Airport. No metros in Mexico currently use any type of barrier however.

=== Pakistan ===
The Lahore Metro utilises half-height platform edge doors at elevated stations and full-height platform screen doors at underground stations. Many bus rapid transit systems have full-height platform screen doors installed, including the Lahore Metrobus, Rawalpindi-Islamabad Metrobus, Multan Metrobus, TransPeshawar, and Karachi Breeze.

=== Philippines ===
Half-height platform screen doors shall be installed on the North–South Commuter Railway, while full-height platform screen doors shall be installed on the Metro Manila Subway. The system is sought to open in stages between 2025 and 2029.

=== Peru ===
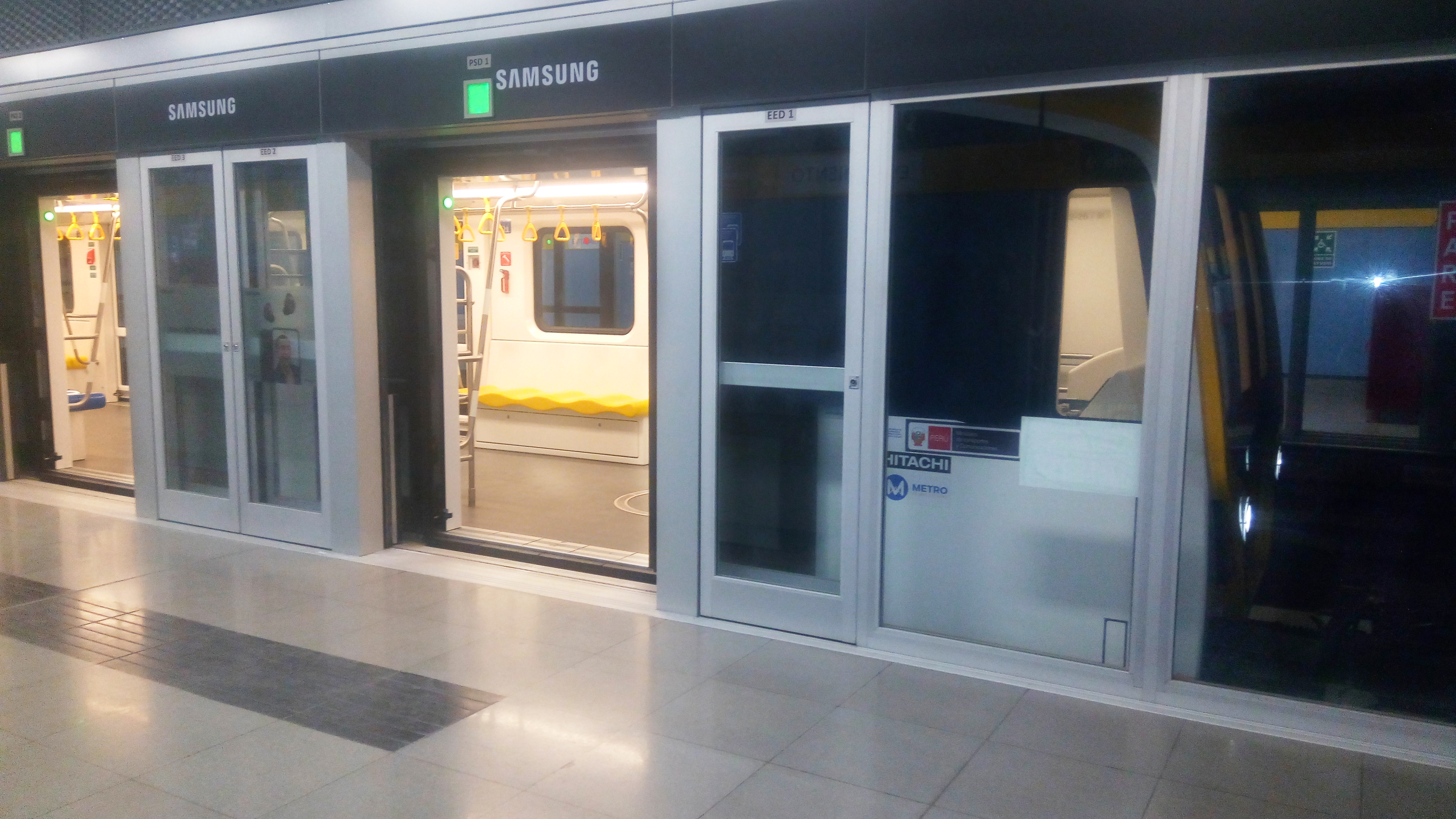
Platform screen doors in use on Line 2 of the Lima Metro

Full-height platform screen doors will be used in underground stations of Line 2 of the Lima Metro, which opened in 2023.

=== Qatar ===
Platform screen doors are in use in all stations of the Doha Metro. They are also found on the Lusail tram.

=== Romania ===
Platform screen doors shall be used on the future Cluj-Napoca Metro.

=== Russia ===
Park Pobedy (Russian: Парк Победы) is a station of the Saint Petersburg Metro that was the first station in the world with platform doors. The station was opened in 1961. Later, nine more stations of this type were built in Leningrad (nowadays Saint Petersburg): Petrogradskaya (Russian: Петроградская), Vasileostrovskaya (Russian: Василеостровская), Gostiny Dvor (Russian: Гостиный двор), Mayakovskaya (Russian: Маяковская), Ploshchad Alexandra Nevskogo I (Russian: Площадь Александра Невского-1), Moskovskaya (Russian: Московская), Yelizarovskaya (Russian: Елизаровская), Lomonosovskaya (Russian: Ломоносовская), and Zvyozdnaya (Russian: Звёздная).

There was an electronic device to ensure that the train stopped with its doors adjacent to the platform doors; they were installed so that driverless trains could eventually be used on the lines. Line 2 uses GoA2 automatic train operation to make this easier, however, Line 3 does not. Unlike other platform screen doors, which are lightweight units with extensive glazing installed on a normal platform edge, the St Petersburg units give the appearance of a solid wall with heavyweight doorways and solid steel sliding doors, similar to a bank of elevators in a large building, and the train cannot be seen entering from the platform; passengers become familiar with the sound alone to indicate a train arrival.

In May 2018, two other similar stations were opened: Novokrestovskaya (now Zenit) and Begovaya. Unlike the first ten stations that were built, these stations utilize glass screen doors, allowing the train to be seen entering from the platform, like most other systems. This configuration of platform doors is highly unusual for the region: the only two metro systems in the former Eastern bloc that have similar doors are those of Minsk and Sofia (shown above).

The only other platform doors in Russia are found on the Sheremetyevo International Airport people mover.

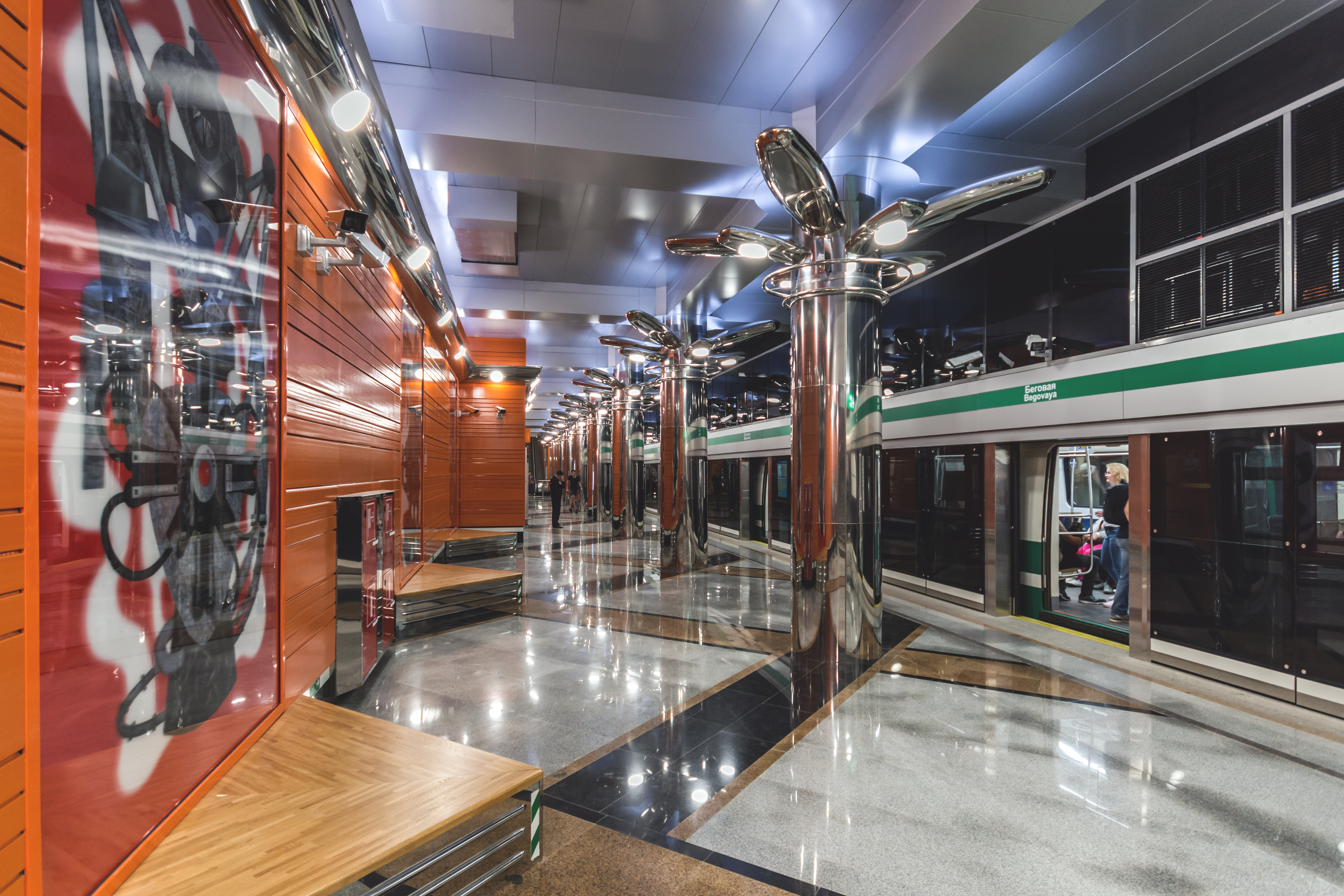
Hall of Begovaya station in Saint Petersburg Metro

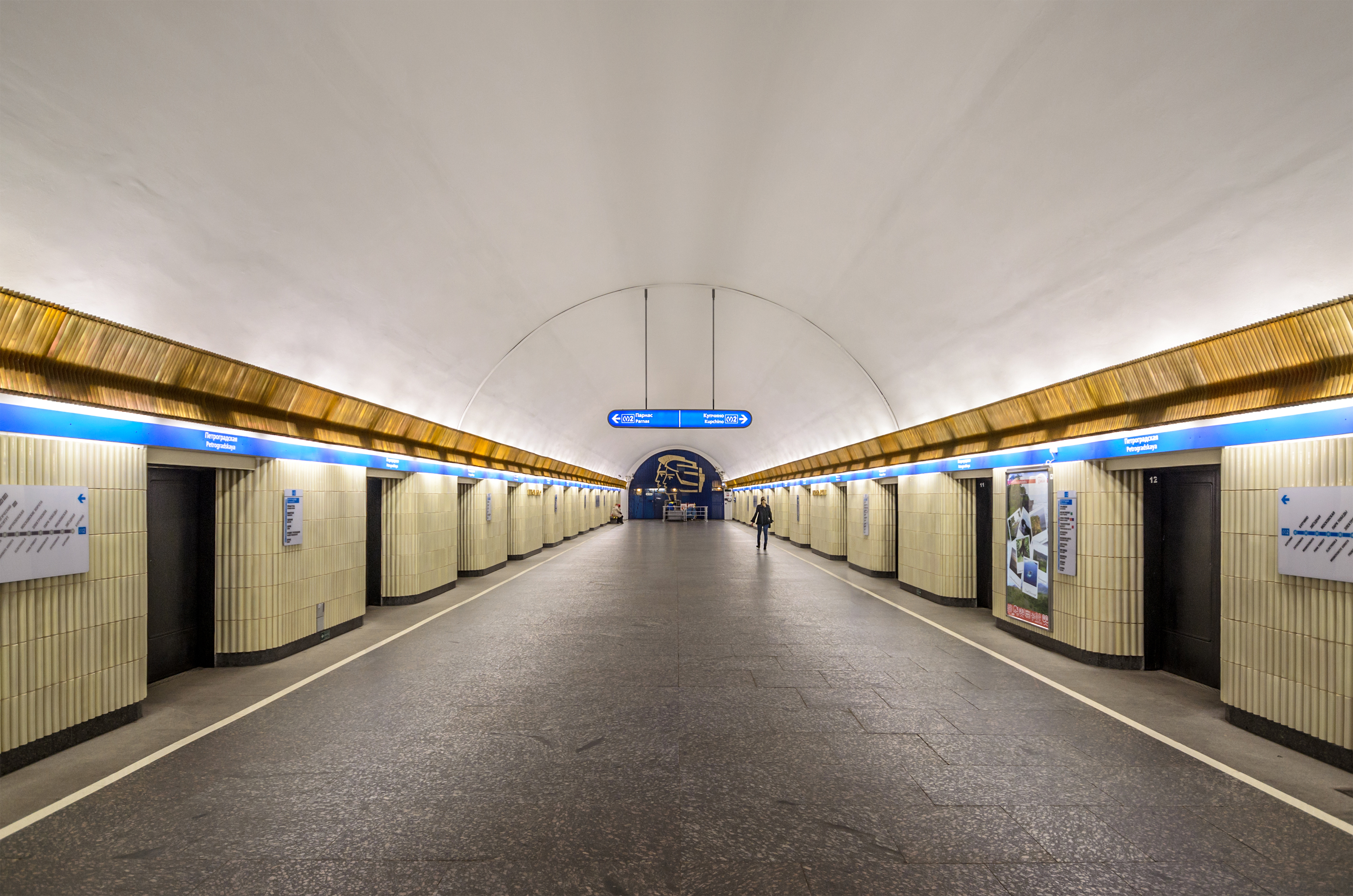
Hall of Petrogradskaya station in Saint Petersburg Metro

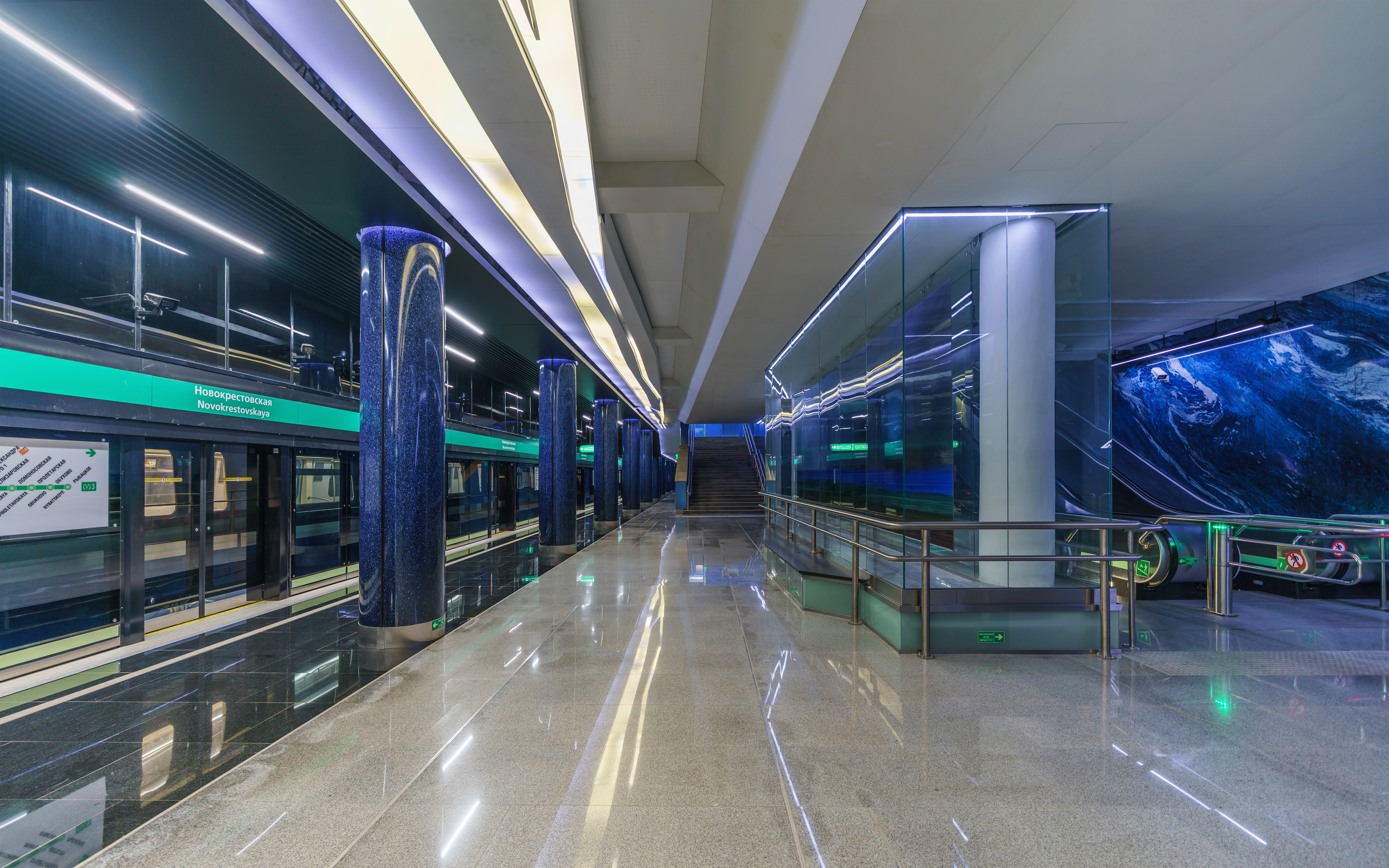
Novokrestovskaya metro station in Saint Petersburg Metro

=== Saudi Arabia ===
The Al Mashaaer Al Mugaddassah Metro line in Mecca uses full platform screen doors. The Riyadh Metro which opened on 1 December 2024 uses full platform screen doors on all stations.

=== Serbia ===
The future Belgrade Metro will have platform screen doors in some stations.

=== Singapore ===
The Mass Rapid Transit (MRT) was the first rapid transit system in Asia to incorporate platform screen doors in its stations in 1987. Full height PSDs mainly manufactured by Westinghouse are installed at all underground MRT and sub-surface stations, while half-height platform screen doors were retrofitted into all elevated stations by March 2012. The LRT stations at Bukit Panjang, Sengkang and Punggol lack physical doors, only barriers with openings where the doors go (excluding the now-closed Ten Mile Junction station, which had full height doors) and vary in size according to their location on the platform.

There are two variants of the full-height platform screen doors in use. The first variant, made by Westinghouse, was installed at all underground stations along the North South line and the East West line from 1987 to the completion of the initial system in 1990. The second variant incorporating more glass on the doors has since been used on all lines thereafter.

Considered a novelty at the time of its installation, platform screen doors were introduced primarily to minimise hefty air-conditioning costs, especially since elevated stations are not air-conditioned and are much more economical to run in comparison. The safety aspects of these doors became more important in light of high-profile incidents where individuals were injured or killed by oncoming trains. In 2008, authorities began the process of retrofitting existing elevated stations with half-height screen doors. However, Land Transport Authority stated that the retrofit was not motivated by the need to make the stations safe, "but to prevent system-wide delay and service disruption and reduce the social cost to all commuters caused by track intrusions." The retrofit was completed in 2012.

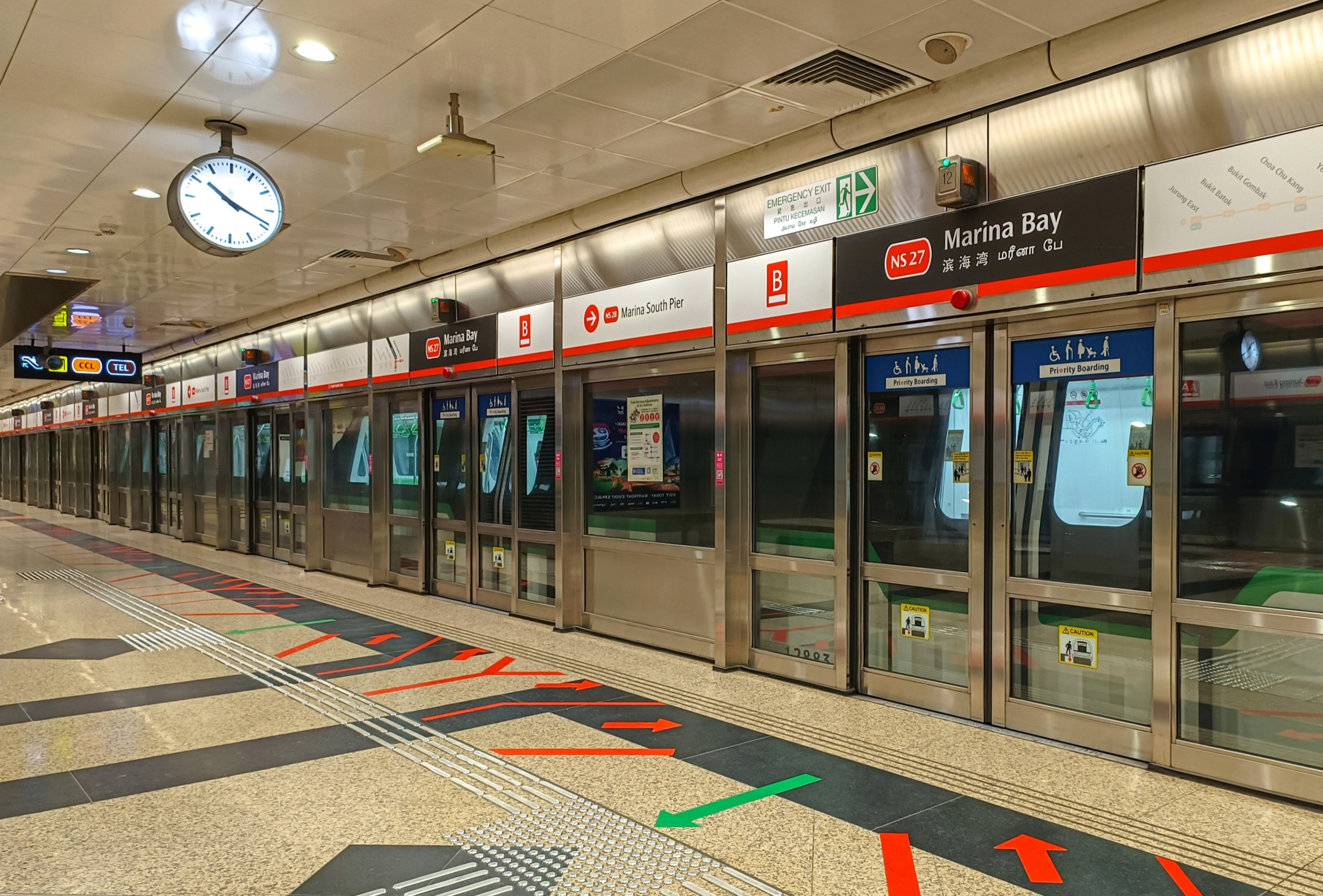
The first generation of platform screen doors at Marina Bay station, on the North South line

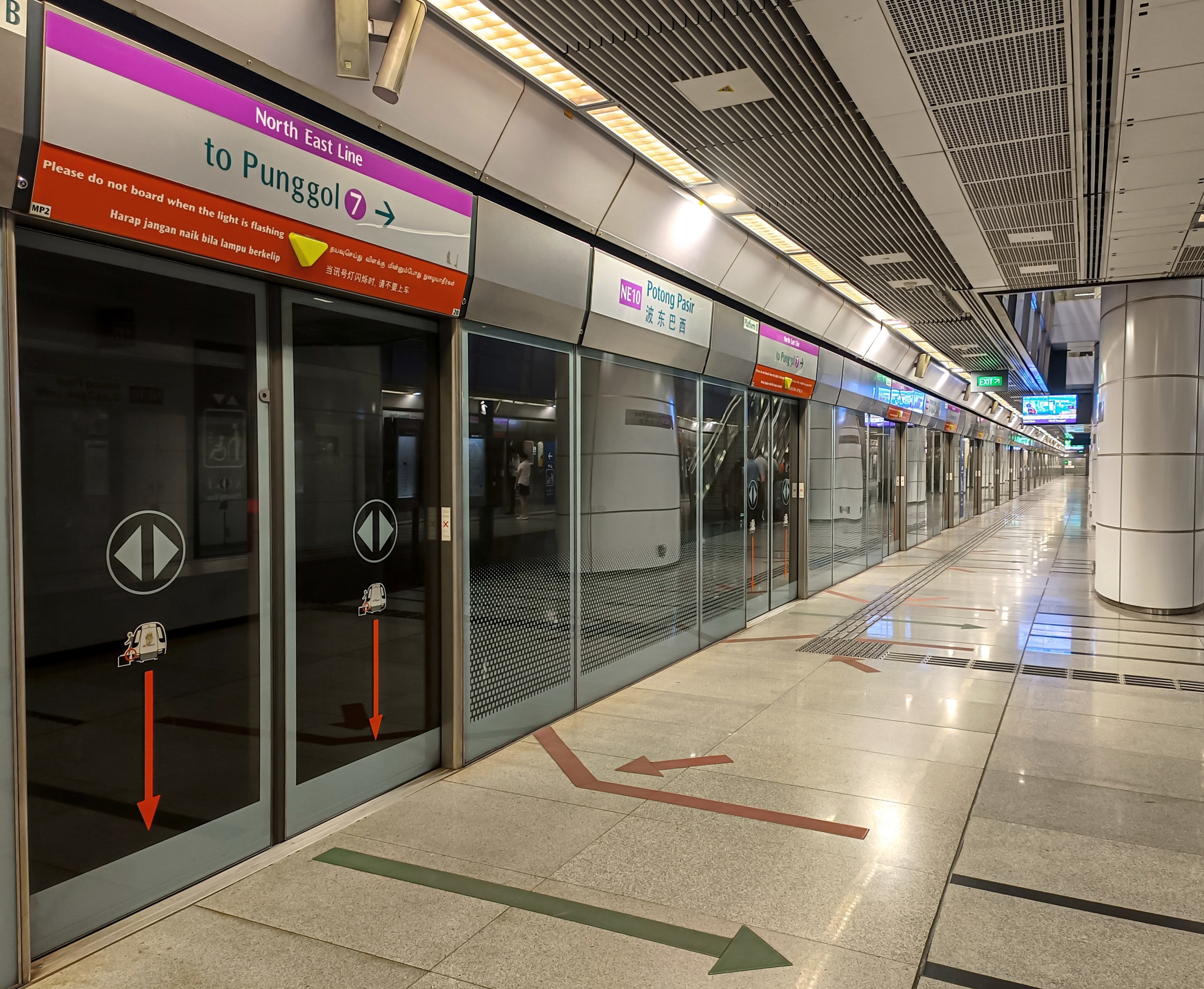
Second-generation platform doors at Potong Pasir station, on the North East line

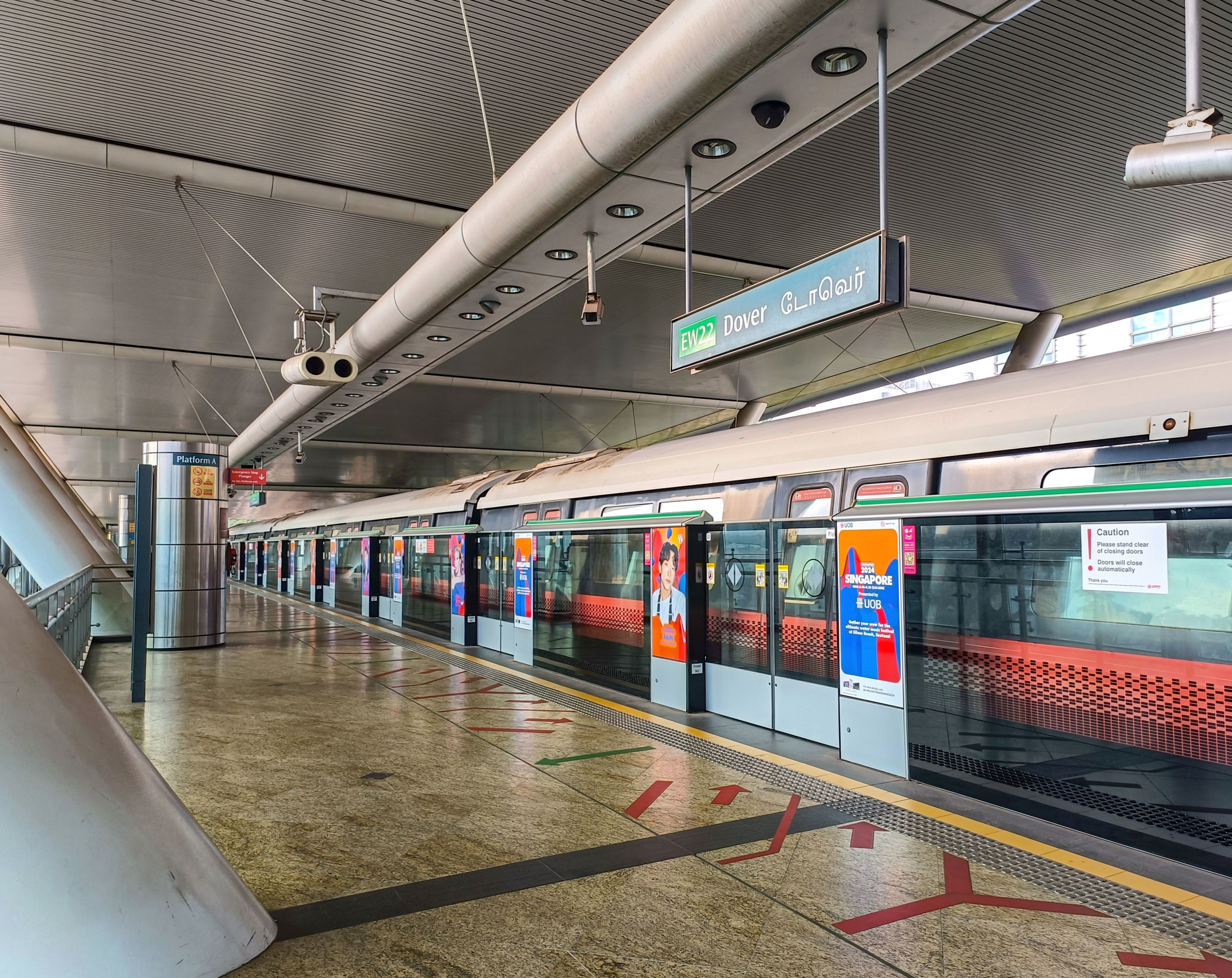
Half-height platform screen doors at Dover station, on the East West line

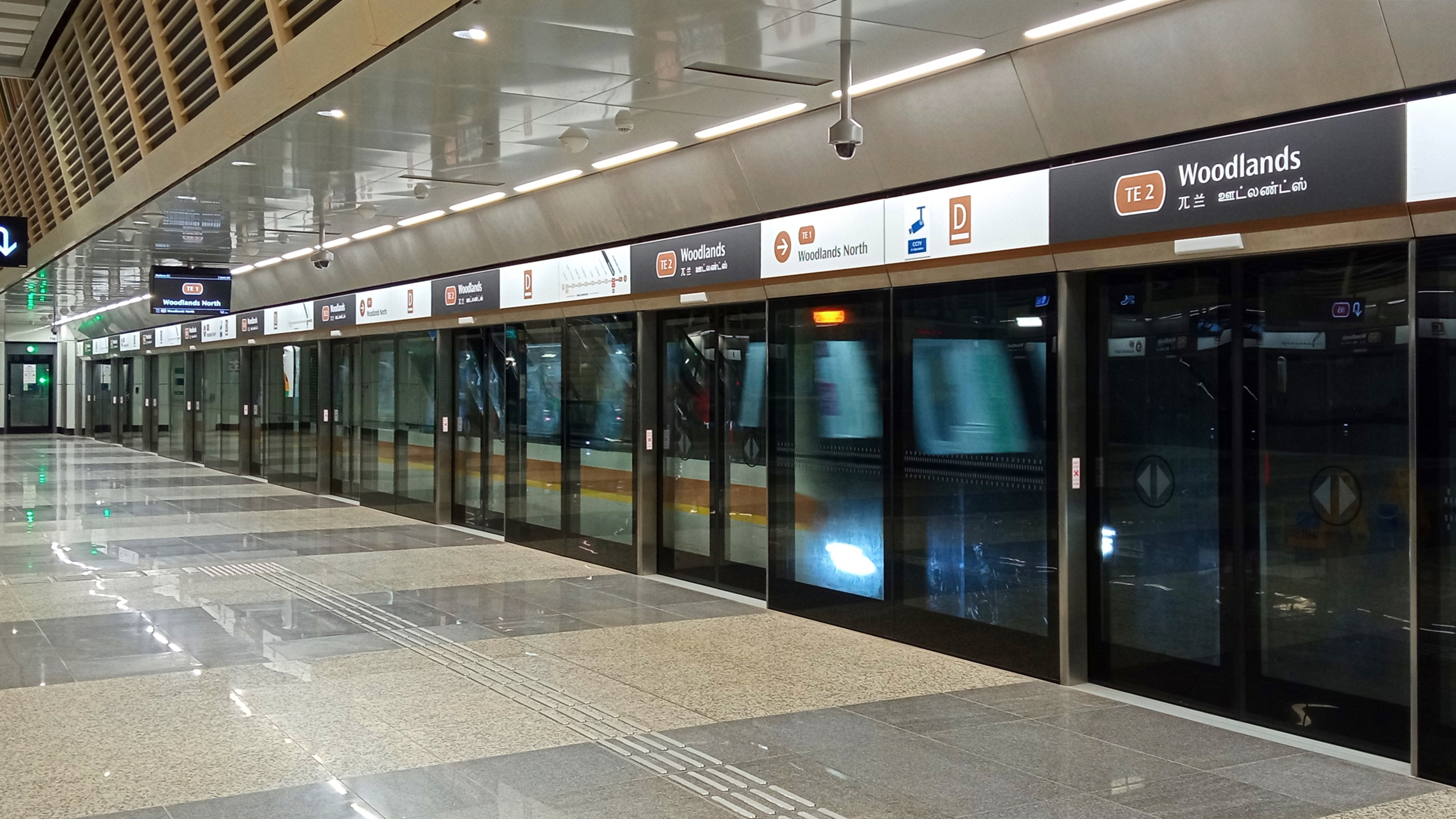
Newest generation platform screen doors at Woodlands MRT station, on the Thomson-East Coast line

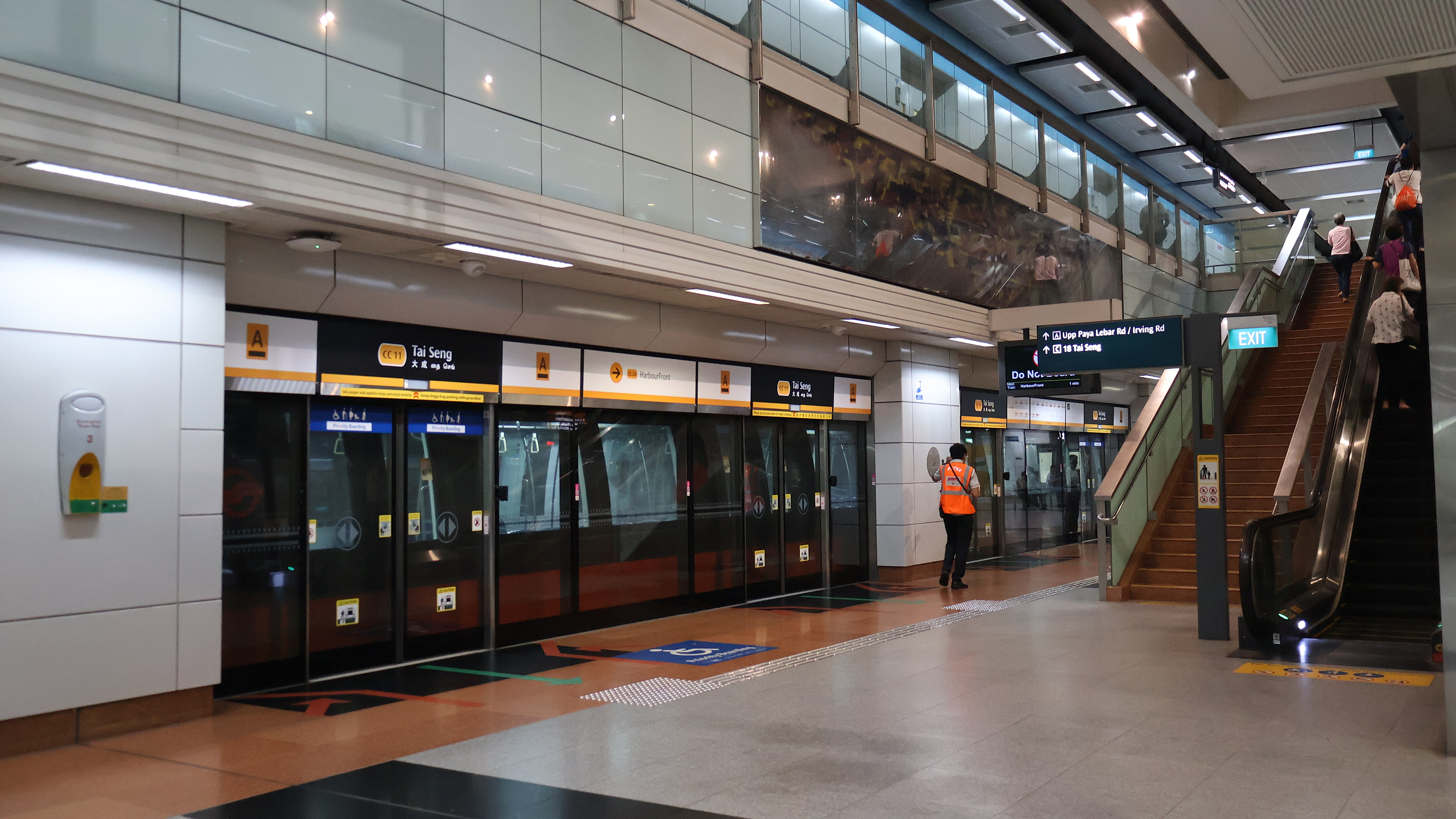
Full-height platform screen doors on Platform B of Tai Seng station, on the Circle line

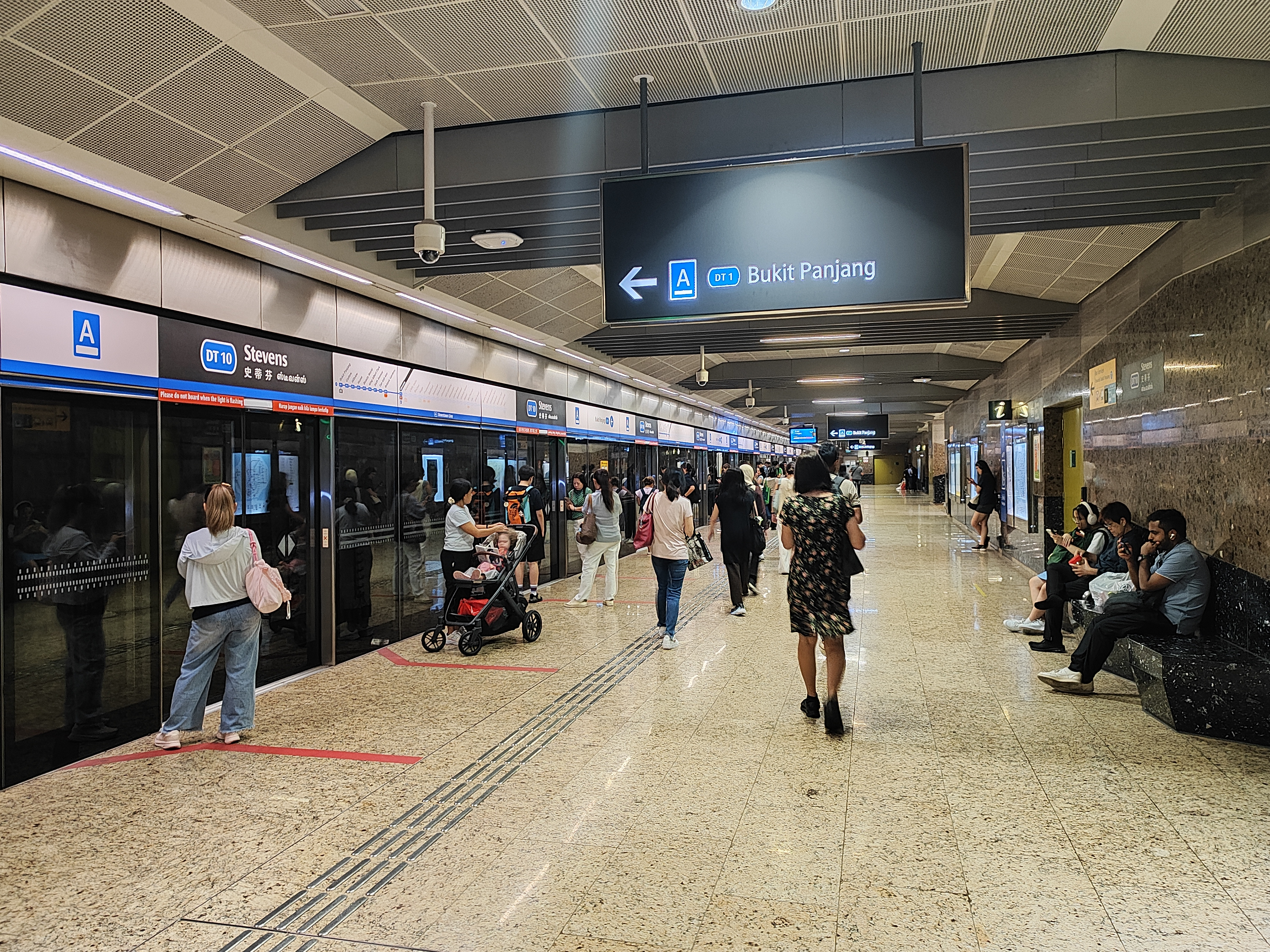
The fourth generation of platform screen doors at Stevens Station, on the Downtown line

=== South Korea ===
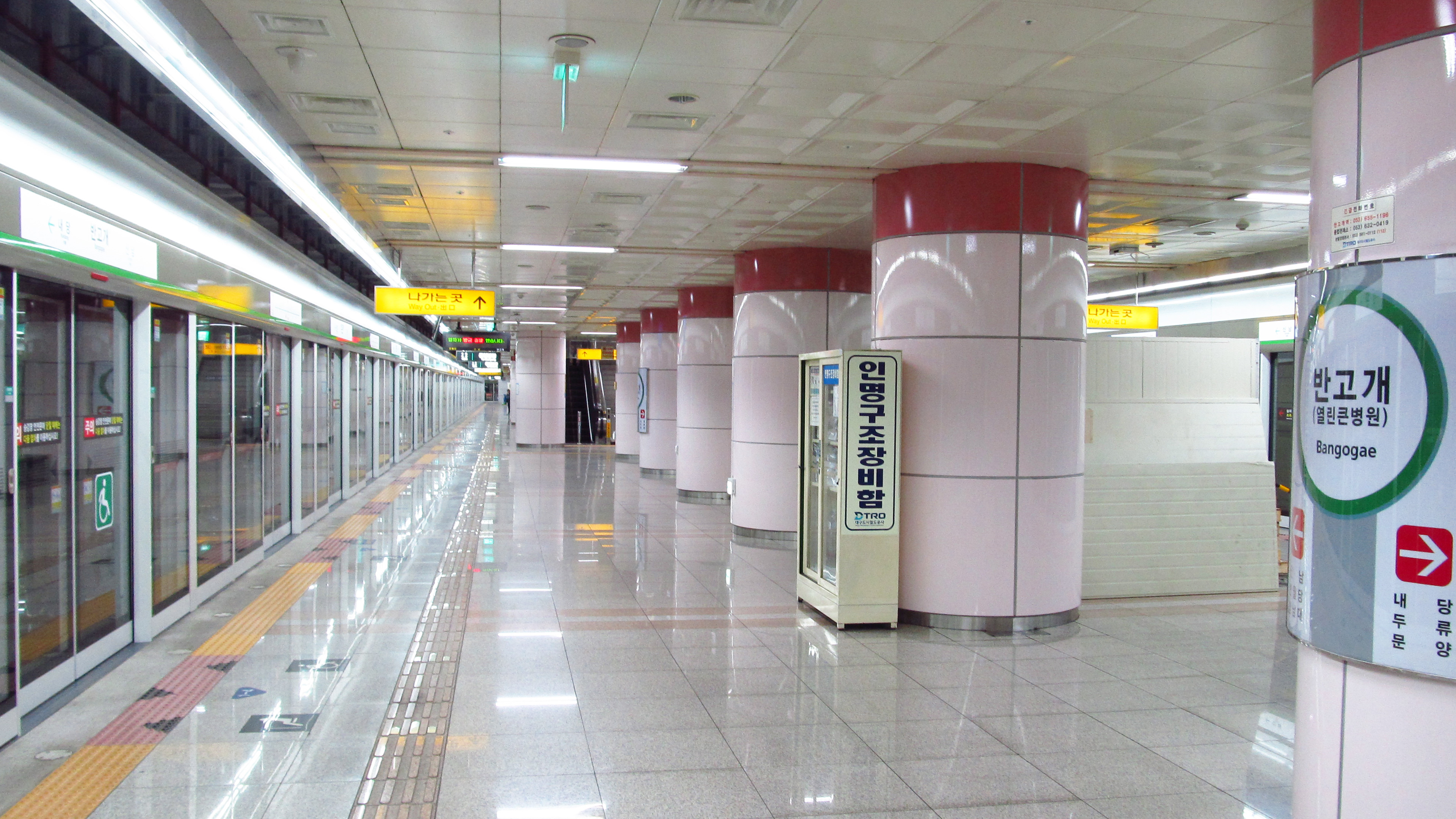
Full-height platform screen doors at Bangogae Station (Daegu Subway Line 2)

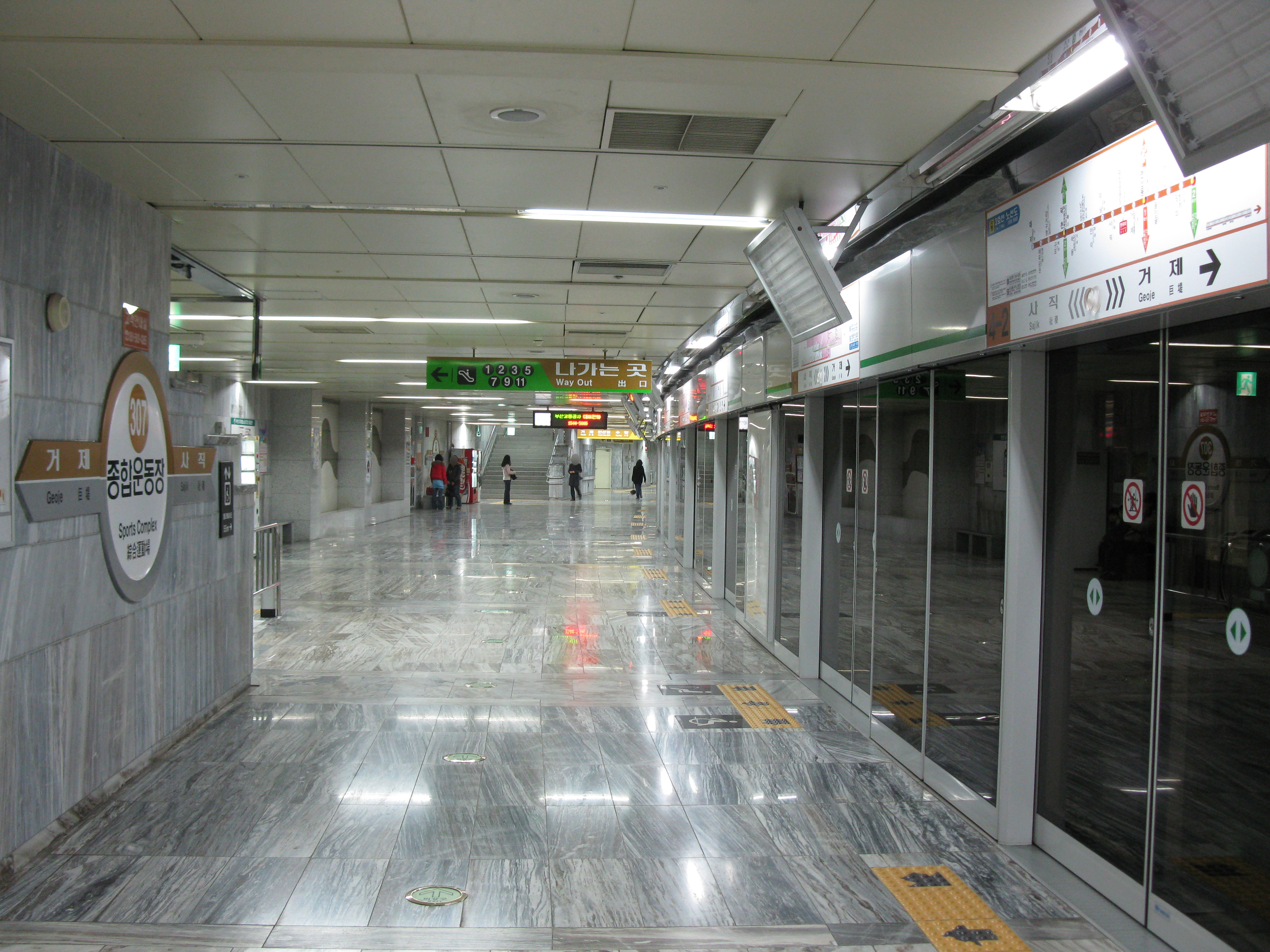
Full-height platform screen doors at the Sports Complex Station (Busan Subway Line 3)

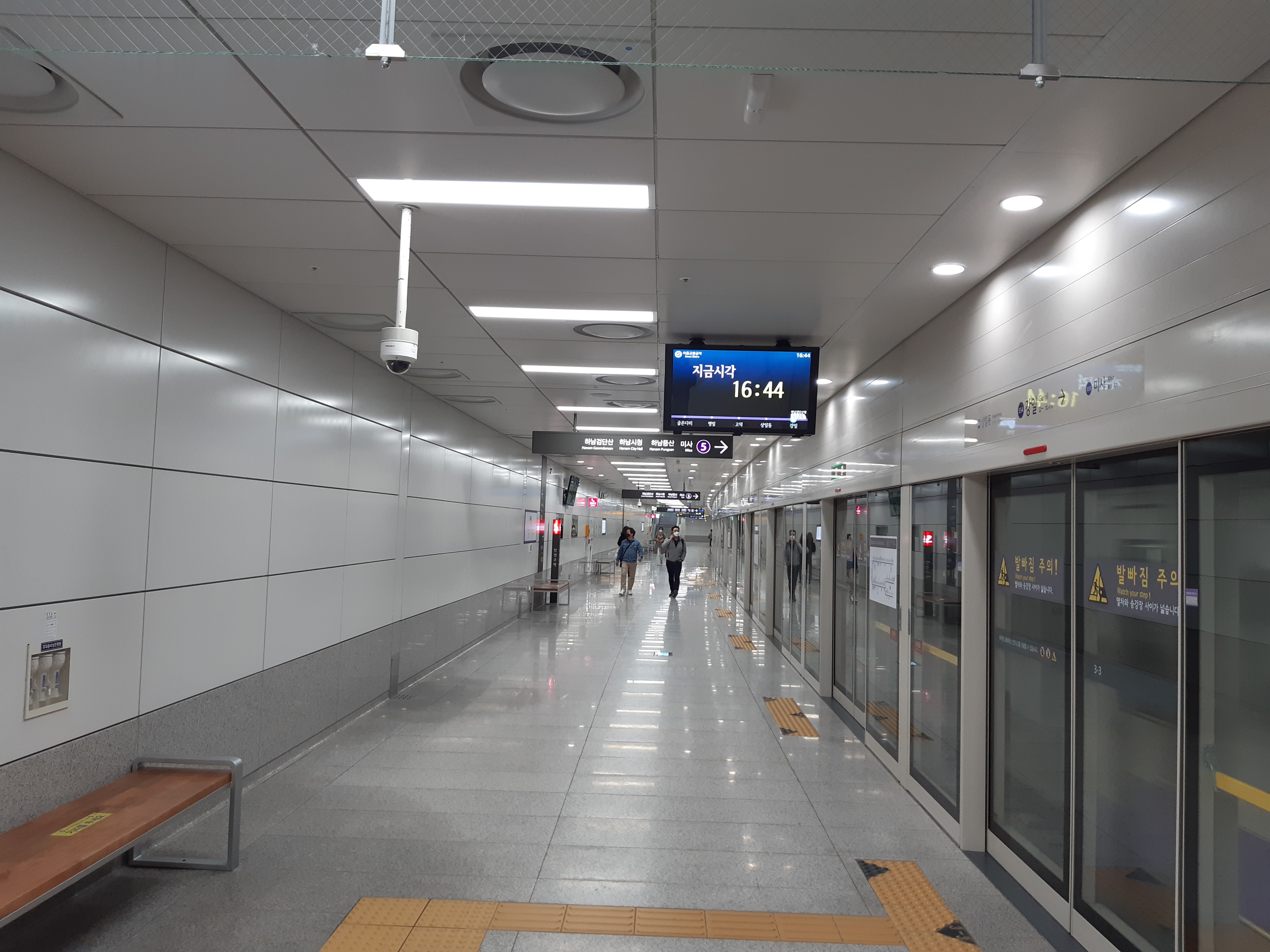
Full-height platform screen doors at Gangil Station (Seoul Subway Line 5)

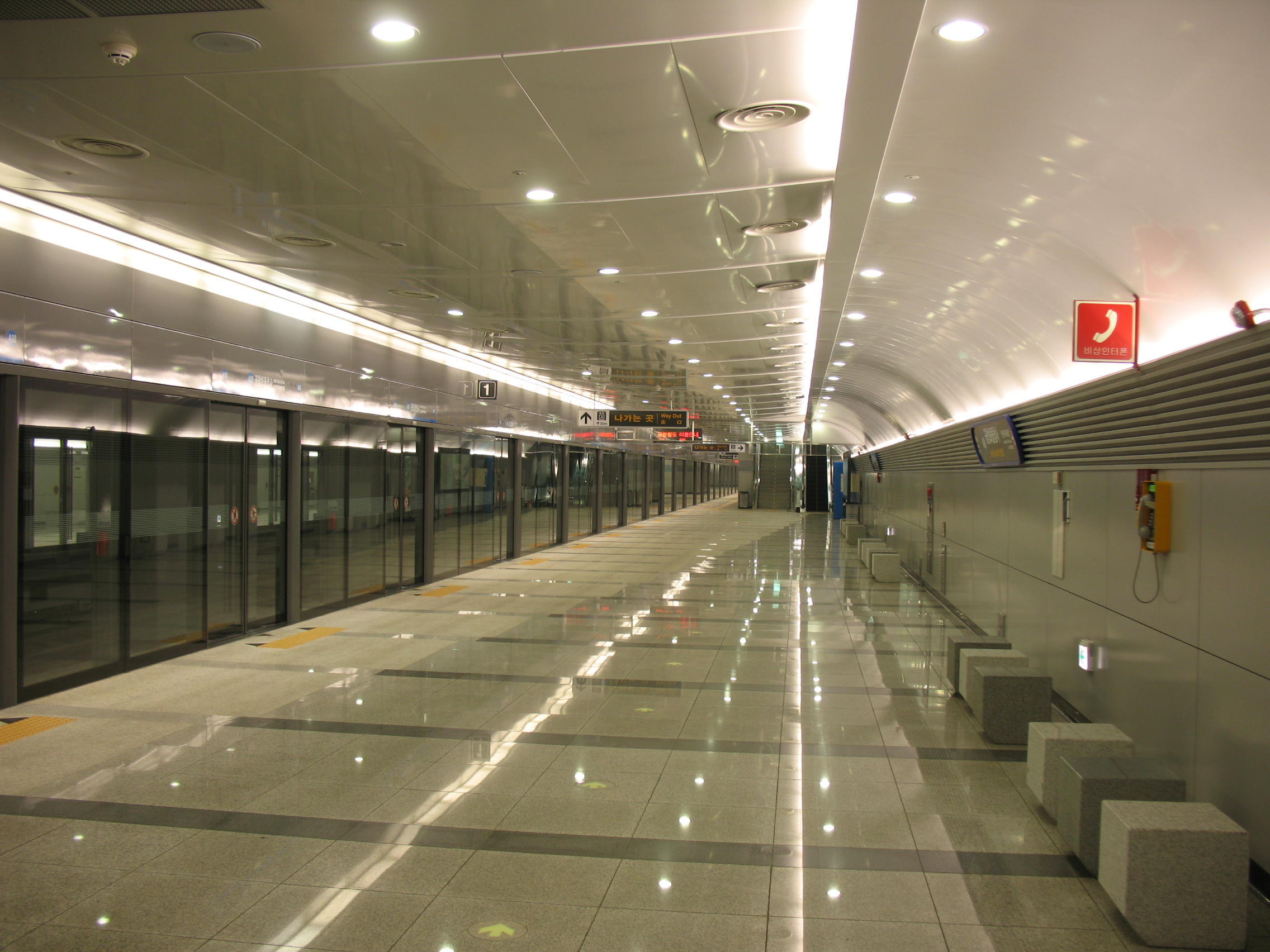
Full-height platform screen doors at Incheon Intl Airport Cargo Terminal Station (Seoul Subway AREX)

Yongdu station of Seoul Subway Line 2 was the first station on the Seoul Subway to feature platform screen doors; the station opened in October 2005. By the end of 2009, many of the 289 stations operated by Seoul Metro had platform doors by Hyundai Elevator. Seoul Metro Lined 1, 2, 3, 4, 5, 6, 7, 8 and 9 were equipped with platform screen doors. Most of the stations operated by Korail have completed installation, but some of the stations like Dorasan Station and Gwangmyeong Station are not yet equipped with platform screen doors. All stations in South Korea will have platform screen doors by 2026, except Dorasan and Gwangmyeong Station. As of 2017, 100% of subway stations are equipped with platform screen doors in Daejeon, Gwangju, Busan, Incheon and Daegu.

The platform screen doors, installed in Munyang station in Daegu Metro Line 2 by The Korea Transport Institute in 2013, have a unique rope-based platform screen named Rope type Platform Safety Door (RPSD). A door sets of rope blocks separate the platform from the rails. When the train arrives, the rope screen door sets are vertically opened and allow passenger boarding to and from the train. This RPSD was also used in Nokdong station on Gwangju Metro Line 1, but was removed in 2012, and a new full-height platform screen door was installed in 2016 instead.

The average yearly fatalities from accidents on Seoul's subway fell from 37.1 persons to 0.4 after the installation of platform screen doors. Noise levels also decreased by 7.9% after the installation platform screen doors, fine dust levels decreased by 20%, and cooling efficiency increased by 30%, saving 16.7 billion won annually.

=== Spain ===
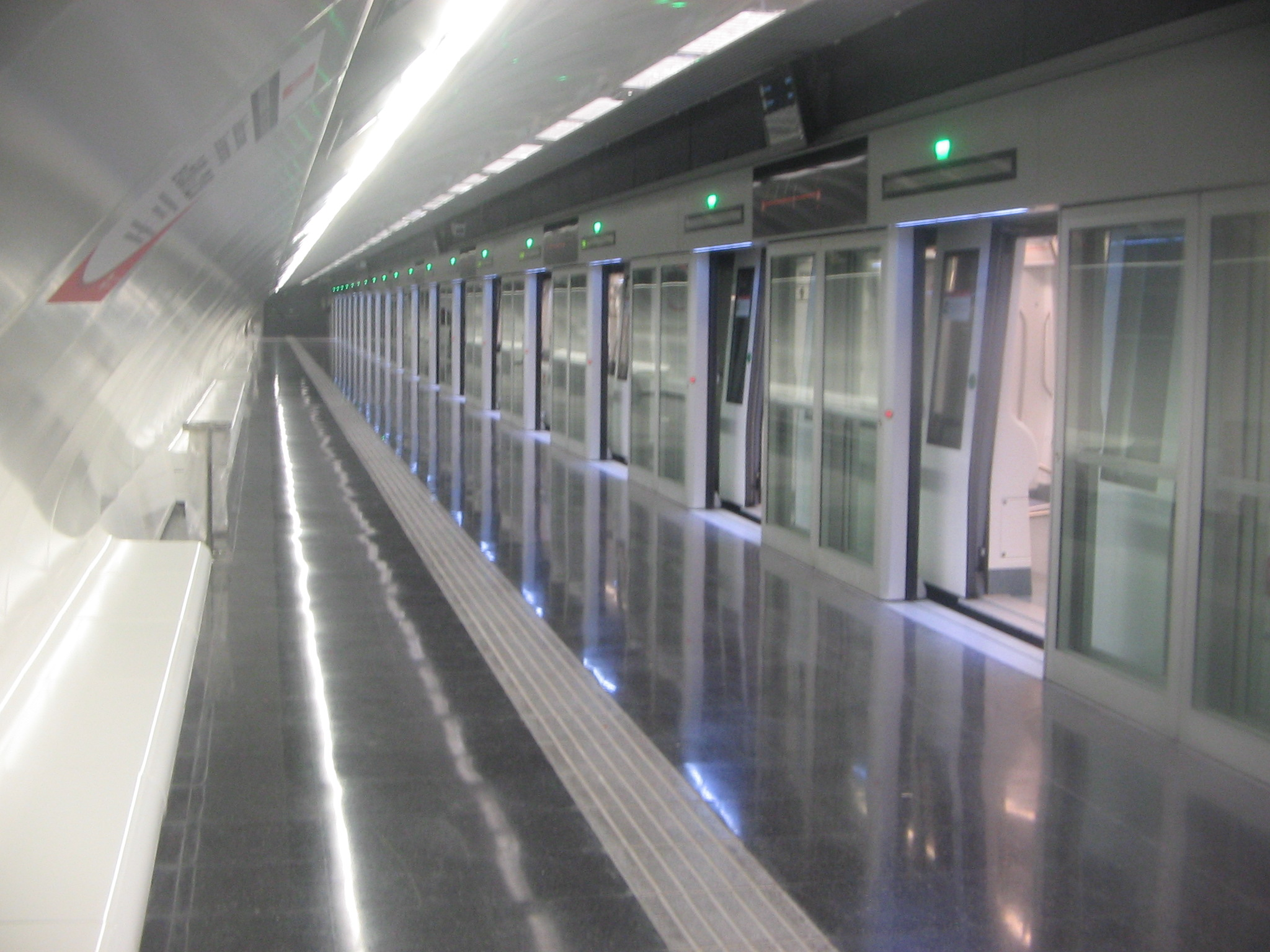
Station of L9 In Barcelona Metro

Half platform screens were installed first in Provença FGC station (Barcelona) around 2003. Later doors were tested on Barcelona Metro line 11 before fitting them on all stations for the new lines 9 and 10, which operate driverless. Platform screen doors were also trialed on four stations of line 12 (MetroSur) of the Madrid Metro from November 2009 until January 2010. Platform doors are also found on the Madrid Barajas Airport People Mover at Adolfo Suárez Madrid–Barajas Airport and the Seville Metro line 1 light metro.

=== Sweden ===
Stockholm commuter rail has platform doors on two underground stations opened in July 2017, as part of the Stockholm City Line. The Stockholm Metro will test platform doors at Åkeshov metro station in 2015 and Bagarmossen metro station in 2021, the metro stations including Kungsträdgården metro station-Nacka Kungsträdgården metro station-Hagsätra metro station will have platform screen doors when it is completed between 2026 and 2030. As there are multiple door layouts in use on the Stockholm Metro (a full-length C20 having 21 doors on each side, and the older Cx series and newer C30 having 24), it is unlikely platform doors will be common anytime soon. The underground Liseberg station in Gothenburg has platform doors which were built before its opening 1993. The reason was safety against the freight trains that go in this tunnel. These doors are built one meter from the platform edge and do therefore not restrict the train type.

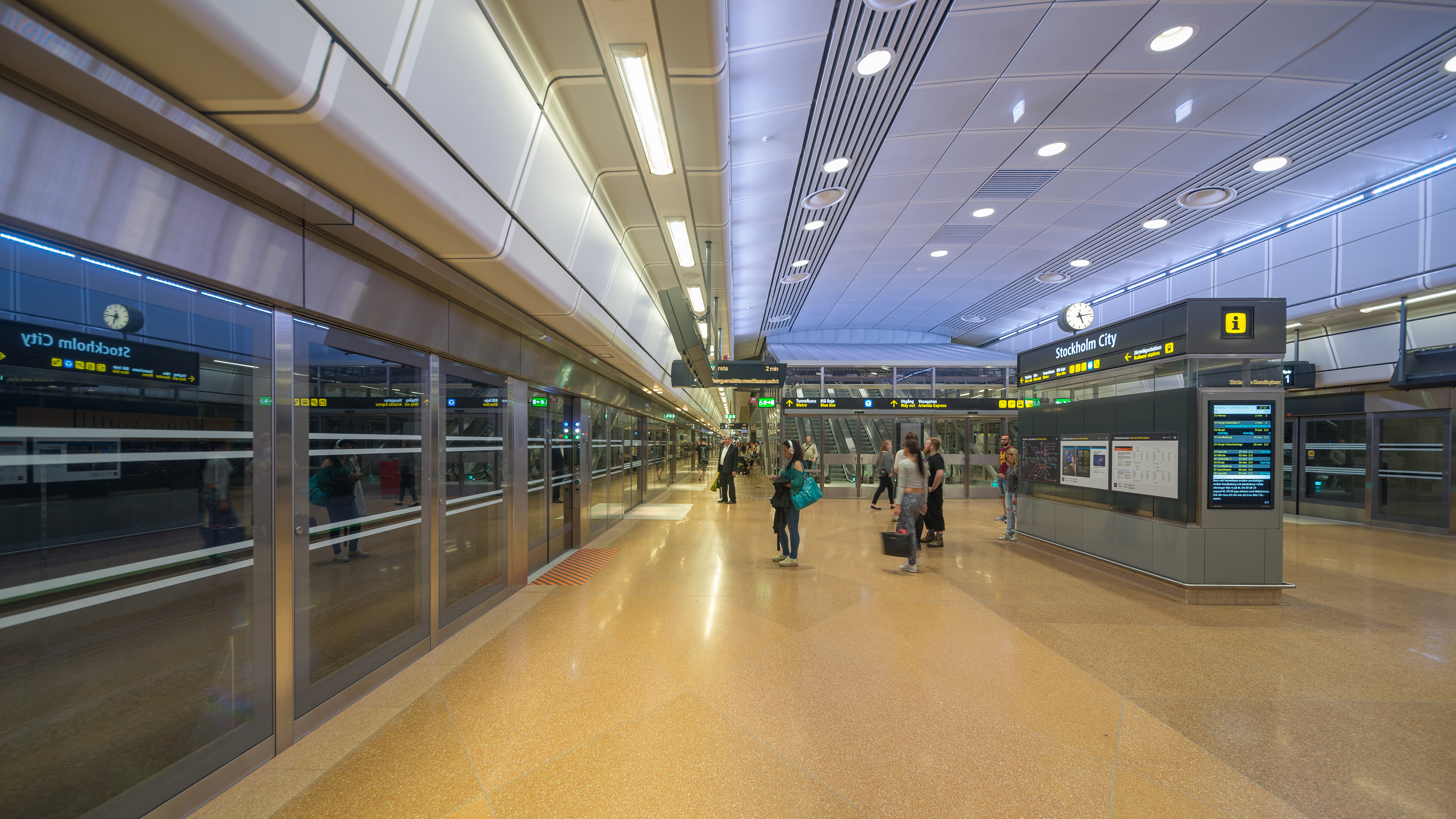
Stockholm City commuter station

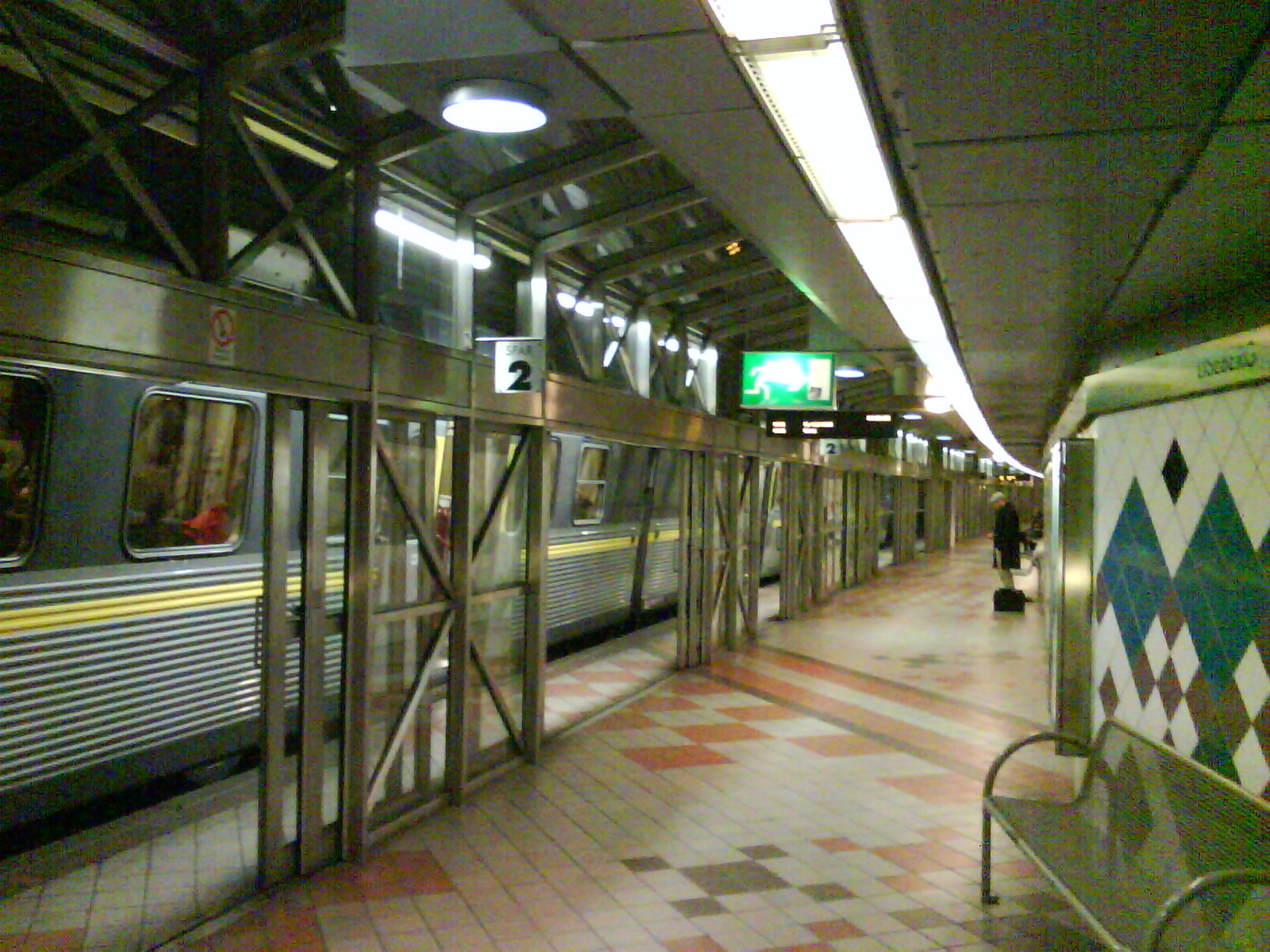
Older doors at Liseberg railway station in Gothenburg

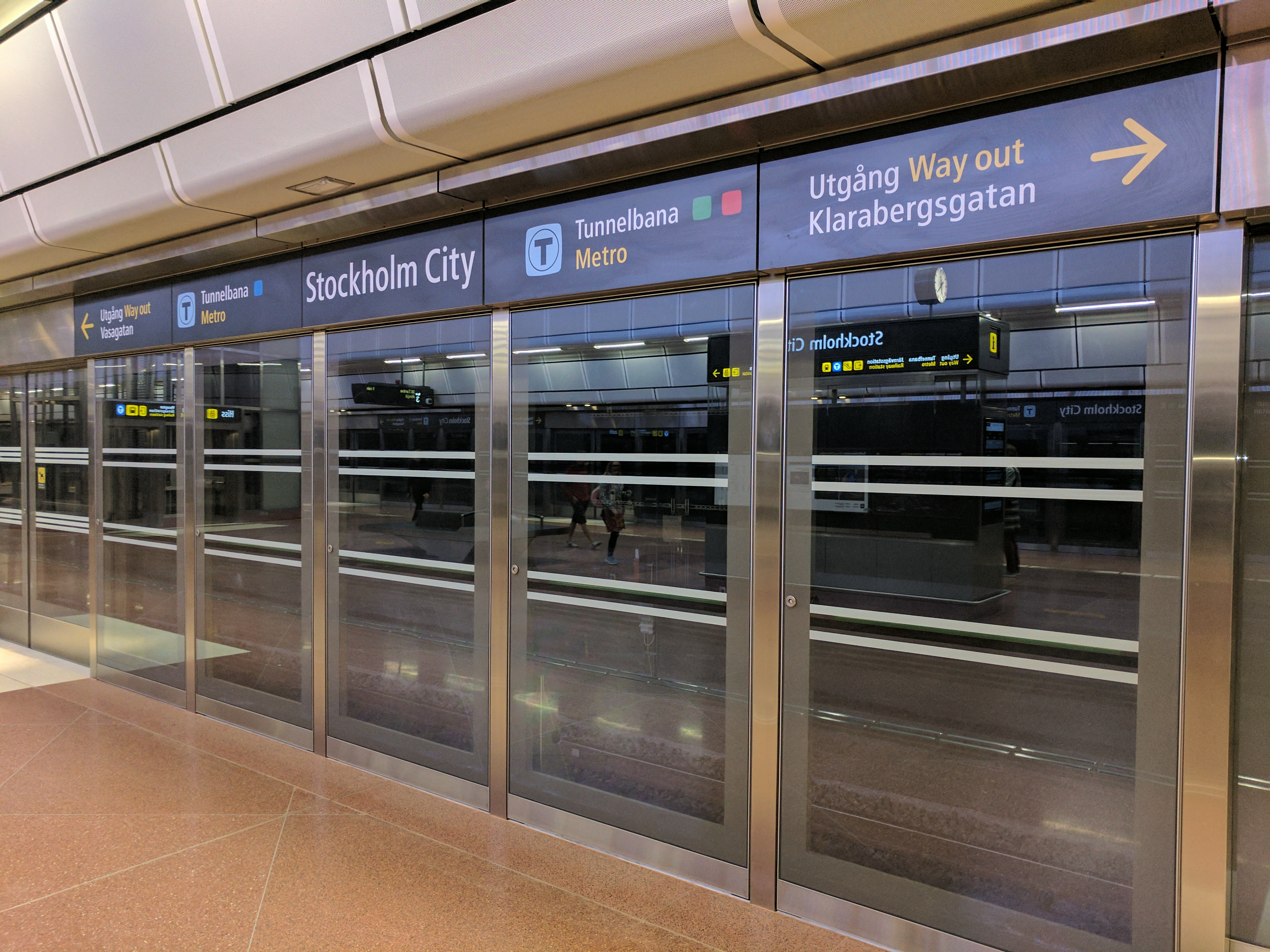
Odenplan station

=== Switzerland ===
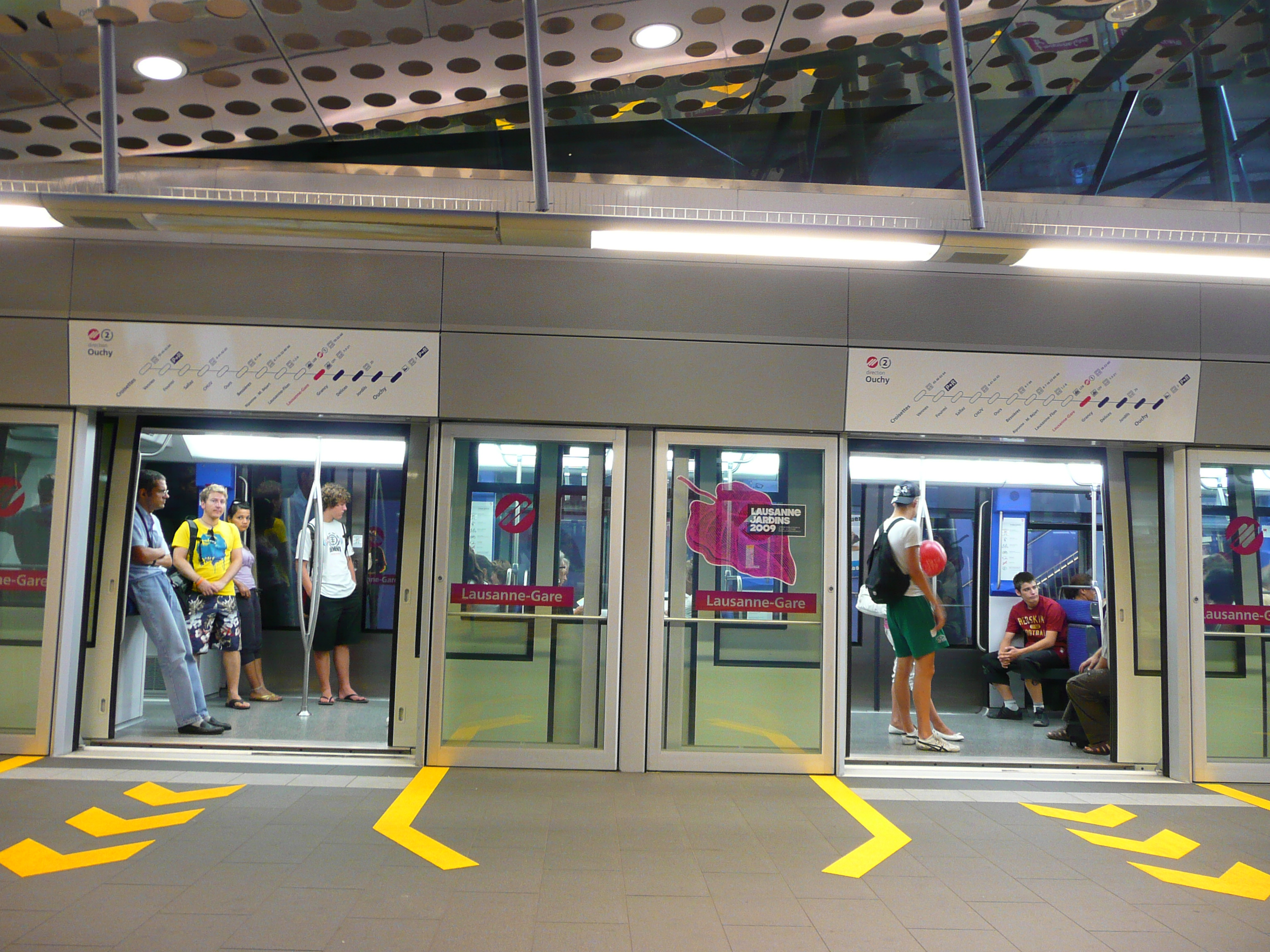
Lausanne Gare station on Line M2 of the Lausanne Metro showing one of the steeply graded platforms

Zurich International Airport's Skymetro shuttle between the main building (hosting terminals A and B) and the detached terminal E has glass screen doors separating the tracks from the passenger hall platforms at both ends. Lausanne Metro Line M2 has glass screen doors at every station, including a rare instance where platform doors are installed on a slanted surface, as the line was previously a funicular.

=== Taiwan ===
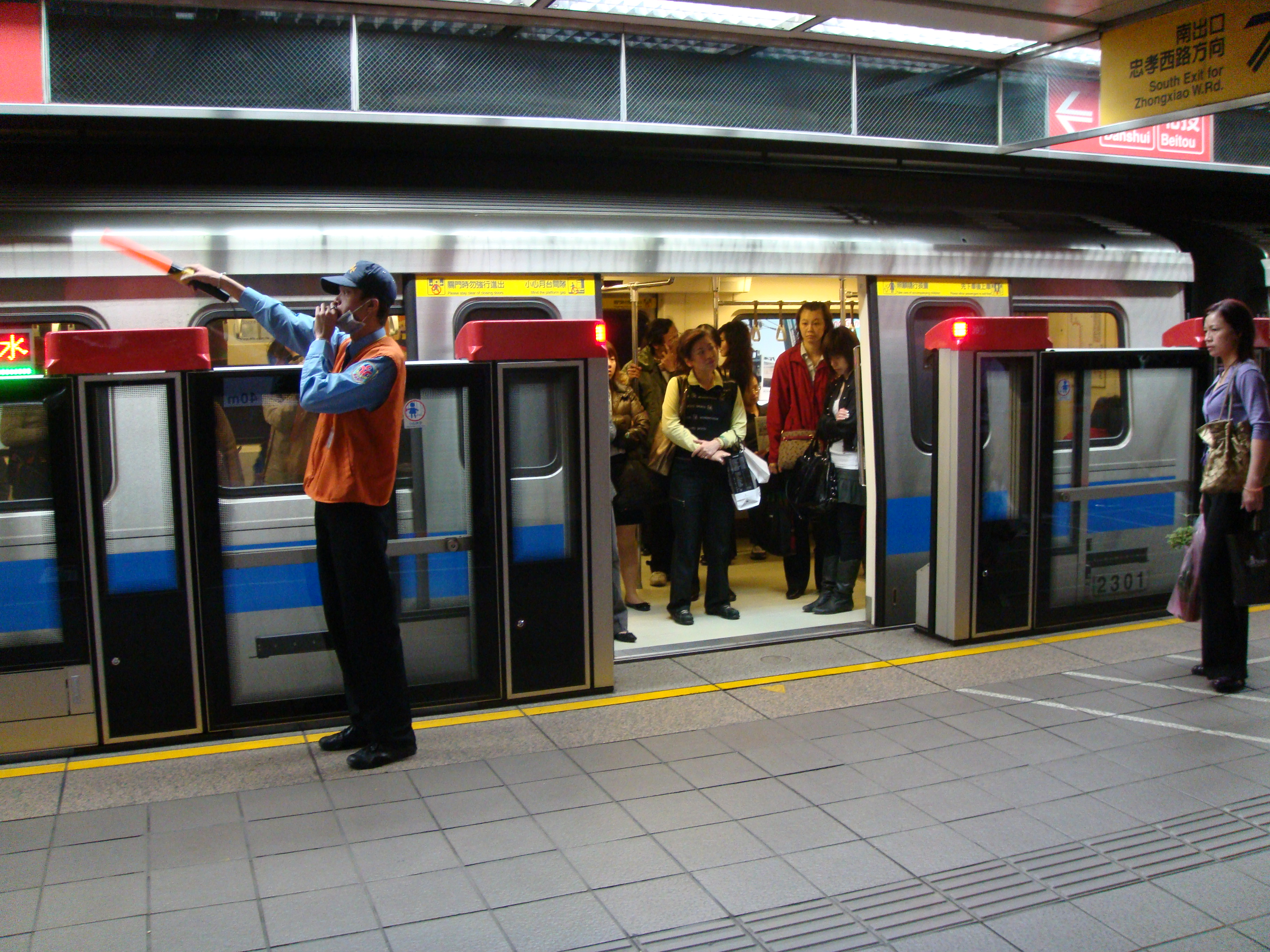
Automatic Platform screen doors on the platform of the Tamsui-Xinyi Line in MRT Taipei Main Station

On Taipei Metro, platform screen doors were first installed on the Wenhu line (then known as Muzha line) in 1996. Older high-capacity MRT lines (Tamsui line, Xindian line, Zhonghe line, and the Bannan line) were initially constructed without platform screen doors but have now been retrofitted with automatic platform gates since 2018. Newer stations, on the Xinyi line (part of the Tamsui-Xinyi line), Luzhou and Xinzhuang line (part of the Zhonghe-Xinlu line), Songshan line (part of the Songshan-Xindian line), Circular line, and part of the Bannan line's Dingpu Station and Taipei Nangang Exhibition Center Station) are constructed with platform screen doors. The Circular line have installed platform screen doors since opening, but Danhai light rail did not, as is typical for most street railways to not have platform doors.

On Kaohsiung Metro, all underground stations have installed platform screen doors, while elevated stations did not. Daliao Station installed half-height platform screen doors in 2020.

On Taoyuan Metro and Taichung MRT, all elevated stations installed half-height platform screen doors while underground stations installed full-height platform screen doors.

=== Thailand ===
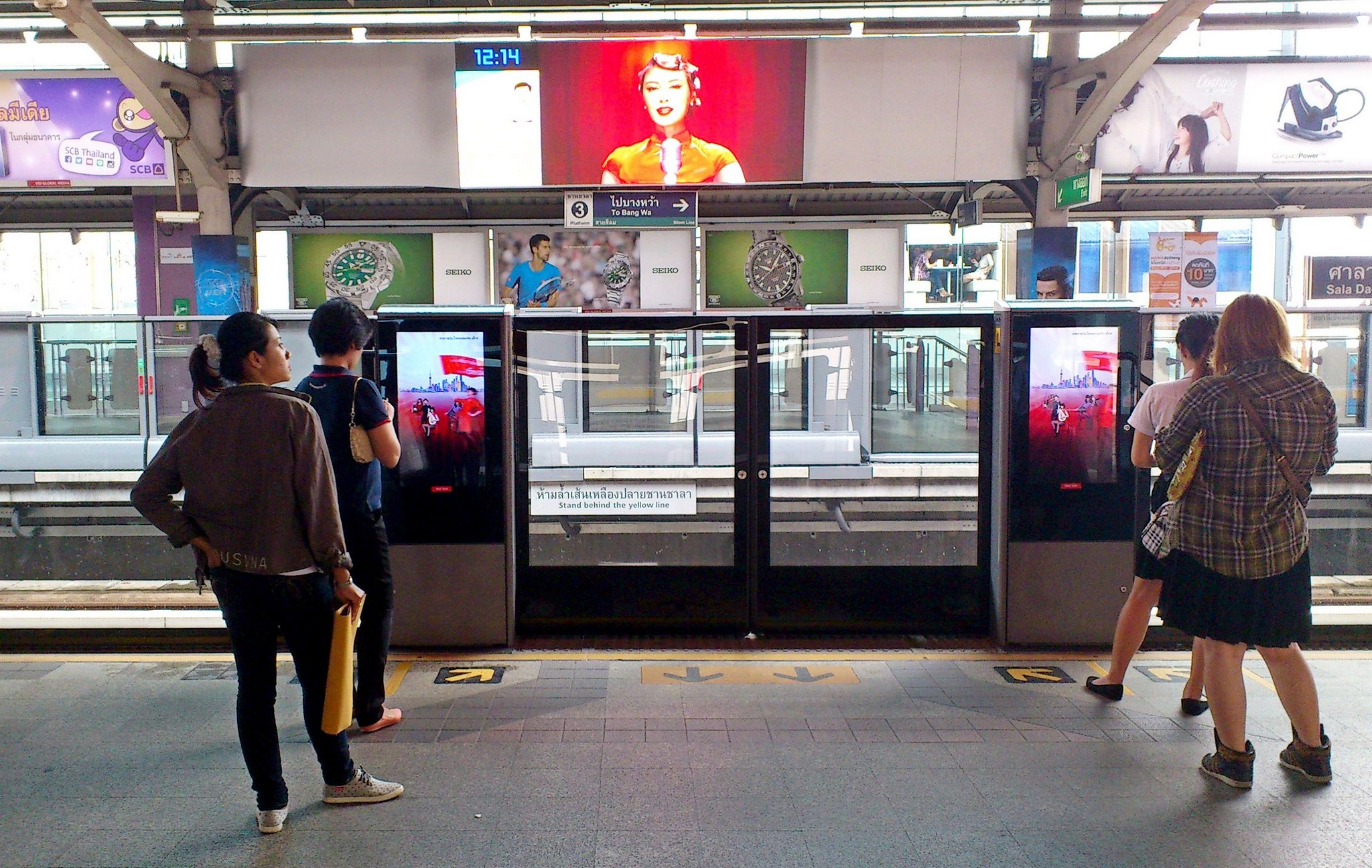
Sala Daeng sky train station, Silom, Bangkok

Platform screen doors were first installed on the BTS Skytrain and Bangkok MRT Systems, followed by the Airport Rail Link System in Makkasan Station (Express Platform) and Suvarnabhumi Station (both City and Express Line platforms). BTS Skytrain system first installed the platform screen doors at Siam Station, later upgrading other busy stations. Today, almost all stations on the Bangkok Electrified Rail System have installed platform screen doors to prevent people from falling onto the tracks. The BTS Skytrain has installed PSDs at 18 out of its 44 stations. PSDs have been installed at all of the stations on the Purple and Blue Lines of the Bangkok MRT system. Airport Rail Link has installed a stainless steel barrier to prevent people from falling, but has not installed full-height doors due to concerns that the high speed of the trains could break the glass. All new stations in Bangkok must install platform screen doors.

=== Turkey ===
Platform doors are found on Istanbul Metro lines M5, M7, M8 and M11, all fully driverless. Seyrantepe station on line M2 and F1, F3 and F4 also have platform doors.

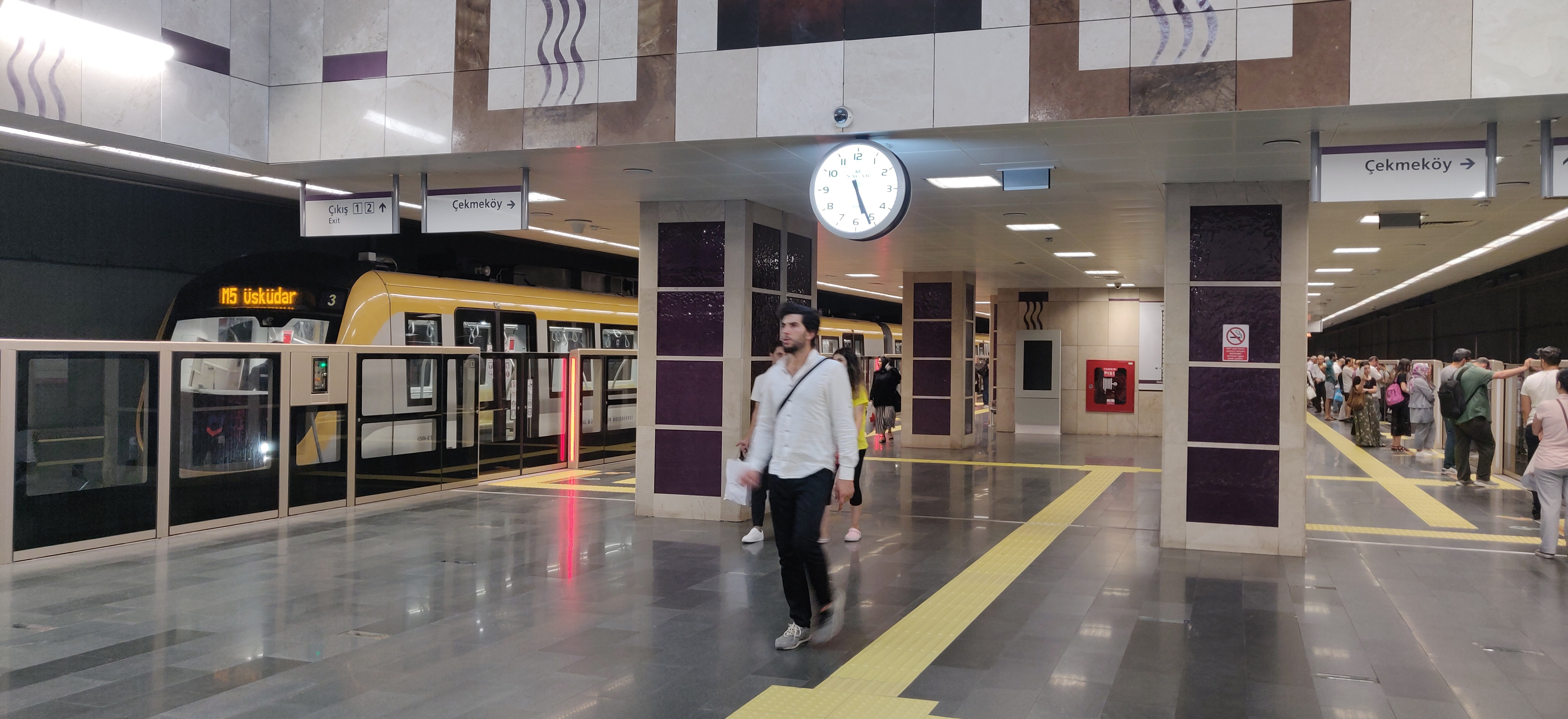
Line M5 of the Istanbul Metro

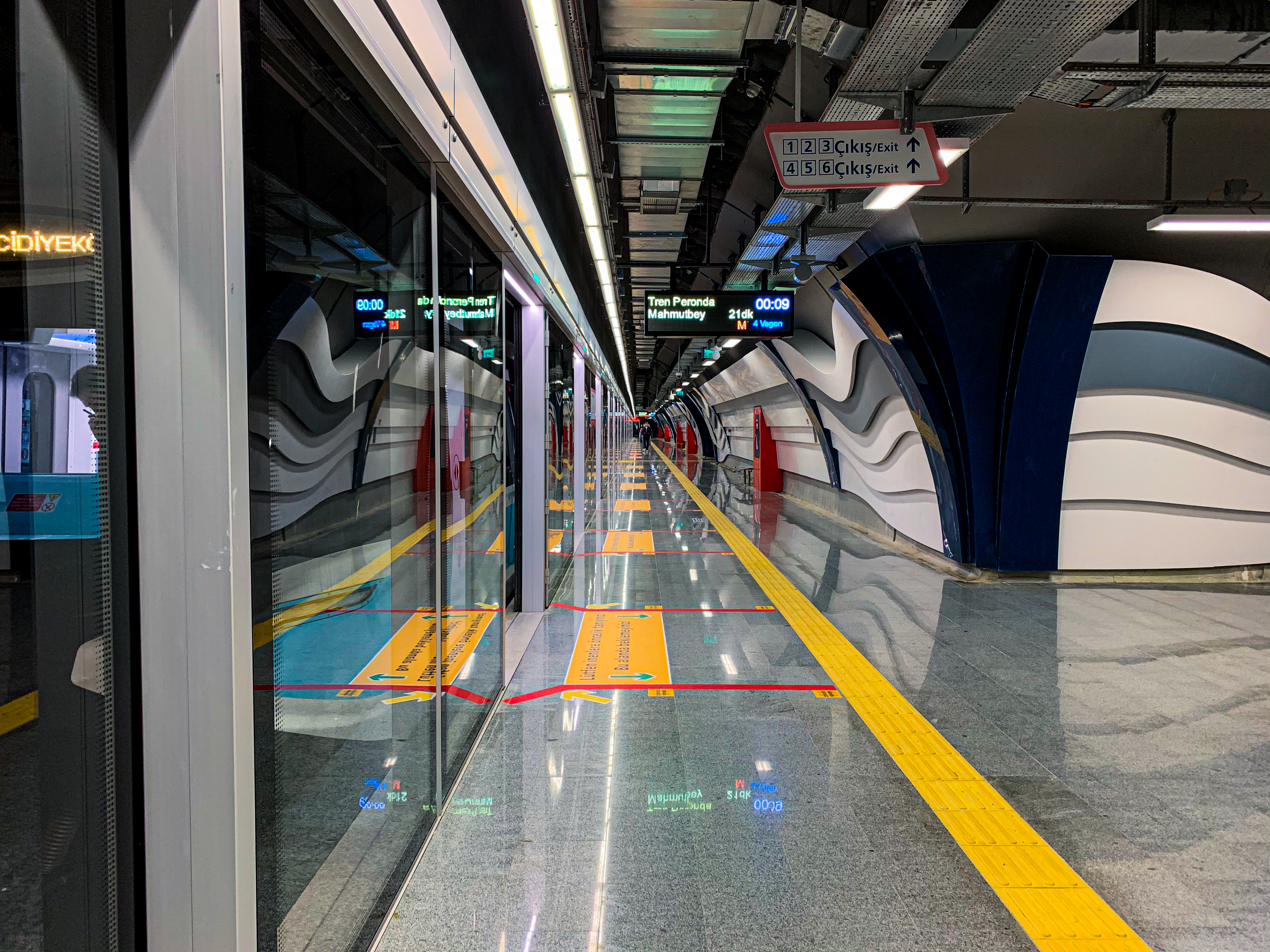
Line M7 of the Istanbul Metro

=== United Arab Emirates ===
Platform screen doors are installed on all the platforms in the fully automated Dubai Metro, as well as on the Dubai Airport People Mover, Palm Jumeirah Monorail and Dubai Tram (the world's first tram system to feature platform screen doors).

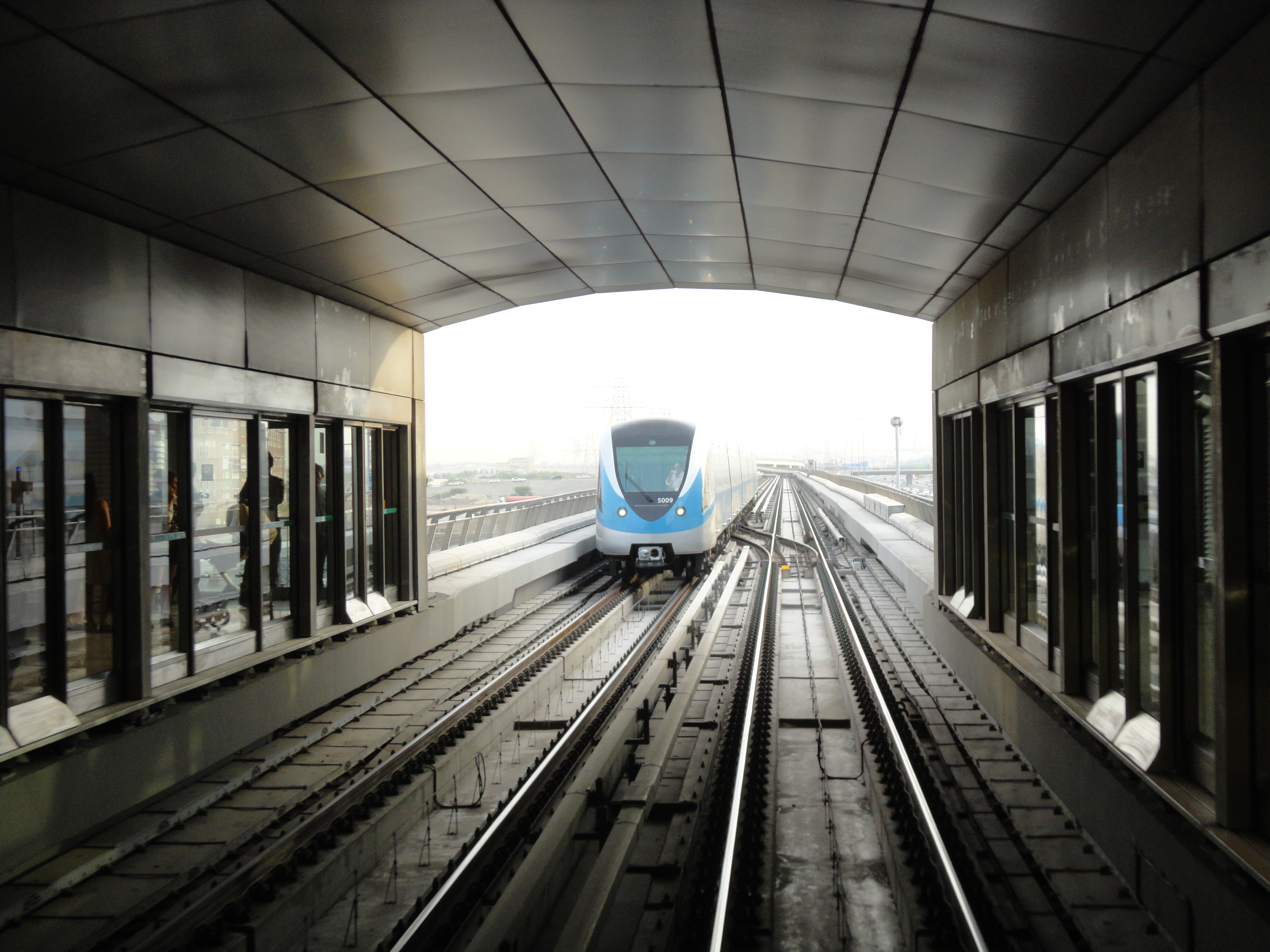
Dubai Metro Stations

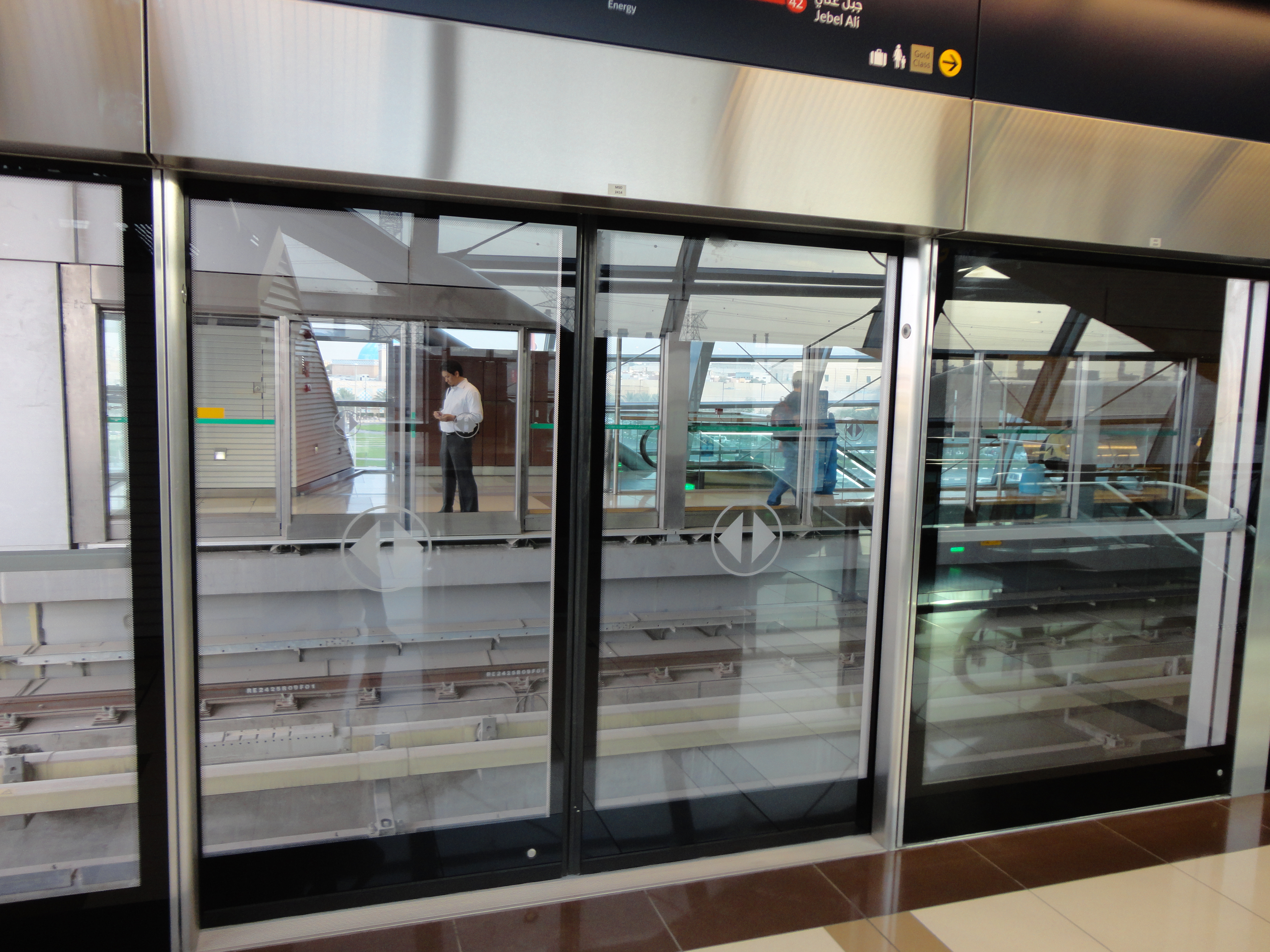
Ibn Battuta Mall station on the Red line in Dubai Metro

=== United Kingdom ===
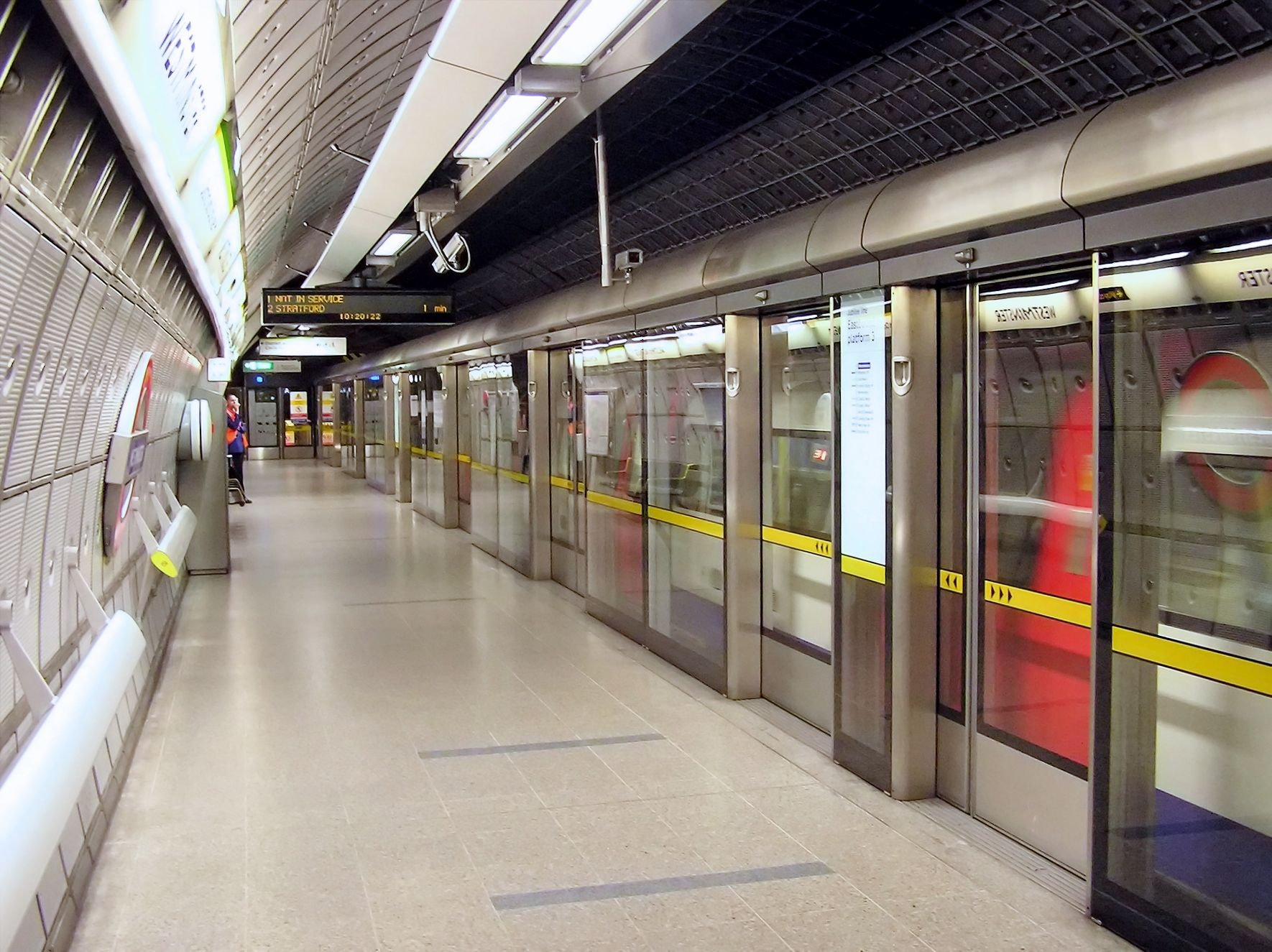
Platform edge doors at Westminster station on the Jubilee Line of the London Underground

PEDs were installed on the MAGLEV based Birmingham Airport AirRail Link, opened in 1984, and on the Stansted Airport Transit System, in 1991, and have been installed on the Gatwick Airport shuttle system, Heathrow Airport Terminal 5 airside people-mover shuttle, in 2011, and the Luton airport DART, in 2023.

The London Jubilee Line Extension project saw platform edge doors, produced by Westinghouse, installed on its new underground stations, in 1999.

London's Elizabeth line (2022) has platform screen doors on each of the sixteen sub-surface platforms of its central section. Each platform has twenty-seven doors which align with the twenty-seven saloon doors of the new British Rail Class 345 which operates the service. The doors form a 2.5 m (8 ft 2 in) high glass and steel screen the entire length of the platform. The door opening is 2.1 m (6 ft 11 in) wide, and the system includes integrated passenger information and digital advertising screens. The system is unusual in that the trains served are full-sized commuter trains, larger and longer than the trains of metro systems more commonly equipped with platform screen doors. In total, some 4 km of platform screen is provided.

There are plans to install PEDs in existing London Underground stations along the Bakerloo, Central, Piccadilly, and Waterloo & City lines as part of New Tube for London. A provision for installing platform edge doors is found on the Northern line extension stations, but no doors were installed in the stations when they opened in 2021.

The Glasgow Subway will complete the installation of half-height screen doors in 2026.

=== United States ===
Platform screen doors are rare in the United States, and are nearly exclusively found on small-scale systems. Honolulu's Skyline, which began operations in June 2023, is the first and only large-scale publicly-run metro system in the country to feature platform screen doors, with platform gates at every station manufactured by Stanley Access Technologies. They are also used by the general-purpose Las Vegas Monorail system.

New York City's Metropolitan Transportation Authority has not committed to installing platform screen doors in its subway system, though it had been considering such an idea since the 1980s. Their installation presents substantial technical challenges, in part because of different placements of doors on New York City Subway rolling stock. Additionally, the majority of the system cannot accommodate platform doors regardless of door locations, due to factors such as narrow platforms and structurally insufficient platform slabs (see Technology of the New York City Subway § Platform screen doors). Following a series of incidents during one week in November 2016, in which three people were injured or killed after being pushed into tracks, the MTA started to consider installing platform edge doors for the 42nd Street Shuttle. In October 2017, the MTA formally announced that platform screen doors would be installed at the Third Avenue station on the L train as part of a pilot program, but the pilot was later postponed. Following several pushing incidents, the MTA announced a PSD pilot program at three stations in February 2022: the 7 and <7> trains' platform at Times Square, the E train's platform at Sutphin Boulevard–Archer Avenue–JFK Airport, and the Third Avenue station. The MTA started soliciting bids from platform-door manufacturers in mid-2022; the doors were planned to be installed starting in December 2023 at a cost of $6 million. Designs for the platform doors were being finalized by June 2023.

People movers, systems that ferry passengers across large distances they would otherwise walk, make use of platform screen doors. These systems are common at airports such as Hartsfield–Jackson Atlanta International Airport and Denver International Airport. The Minneapolis–Saint Paul International Airport Airport Trams use screen doors. The Port Authority of New York and New Jersey uses full height platform screen doors at two of its systems: AirTrain JFK and AirTrain Newark (serving John F. Kennedy International Airport and Newark Liberty International Airport respectively). San Francisco International Airport has AirTrain, a 6-mile-long line whose stations are fully enclosed with platform screen doors, allowing access to the fully automated people mover. Chicago O'Hare International Airport has a people mover system which operates 24 hours a day and is a 2.5 mile long (4 km) line that operates between the four terminals at the airport and parking areas; each station is fully enclosed with platform screen doors allowing access to the fully automated people mover trains. AeroTrain is a 3.78-mile (6.08 km) people mover system at Washington Dulles International Airport in Dulles, Virginia, with fully enclosed tracks including platform screen doors. The United States Capitol subway system, a train cart people mover system, uses platform gates.

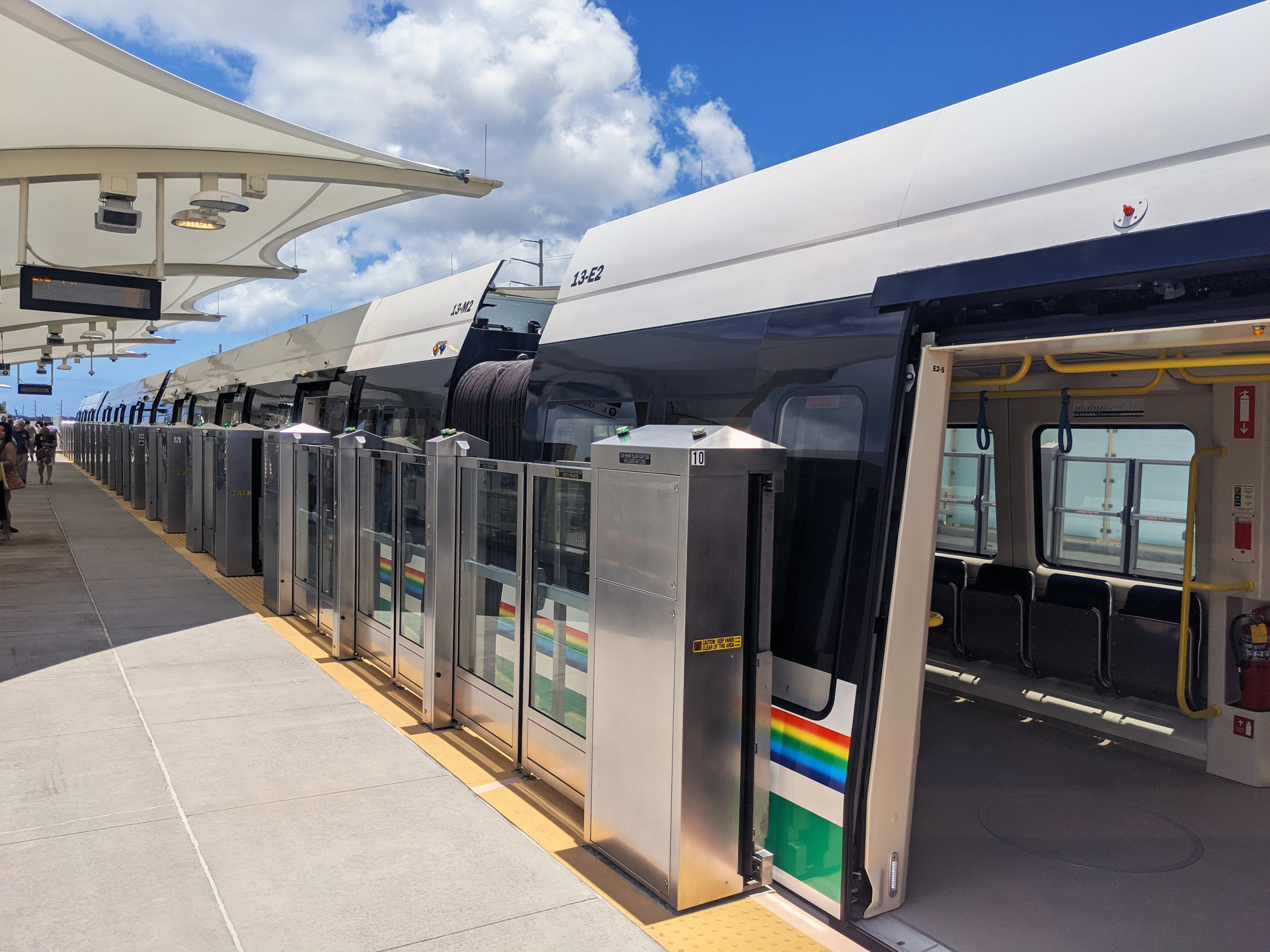
Automatic platform gates at Skyline's Hālawa station

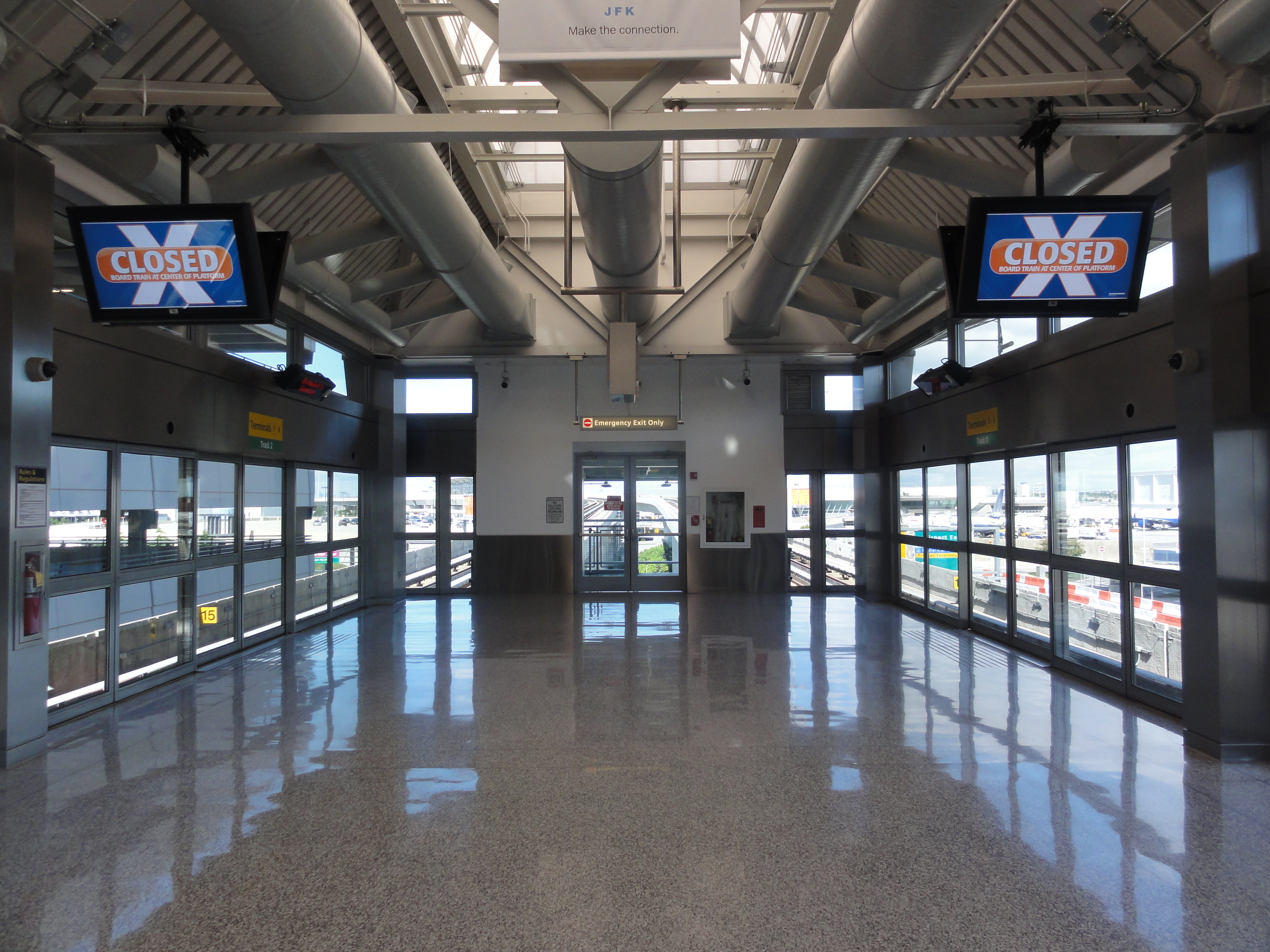
AirTrain JFK's Terminal 5 station

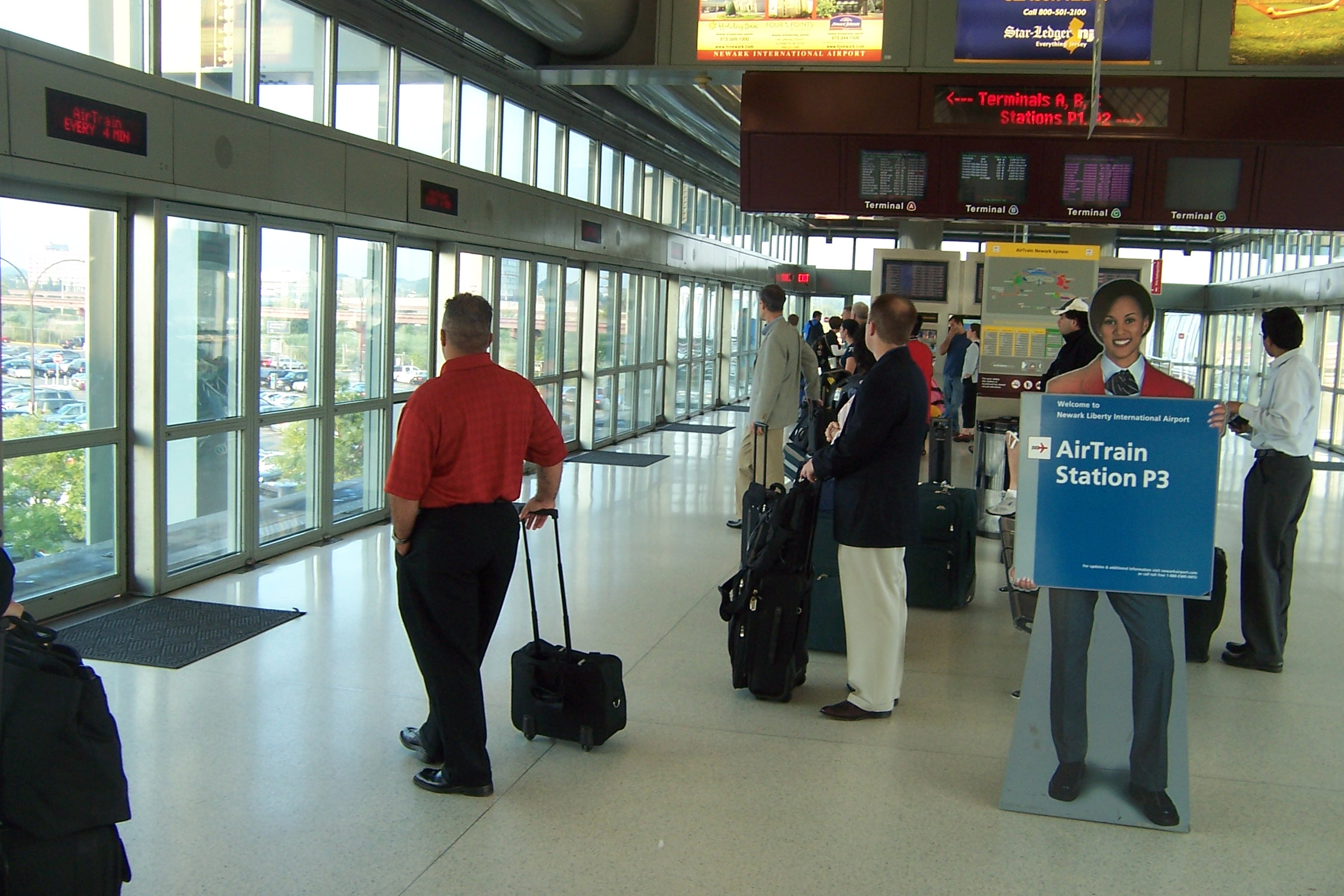
Platform-level interior of AirTrain Newark's P3 station

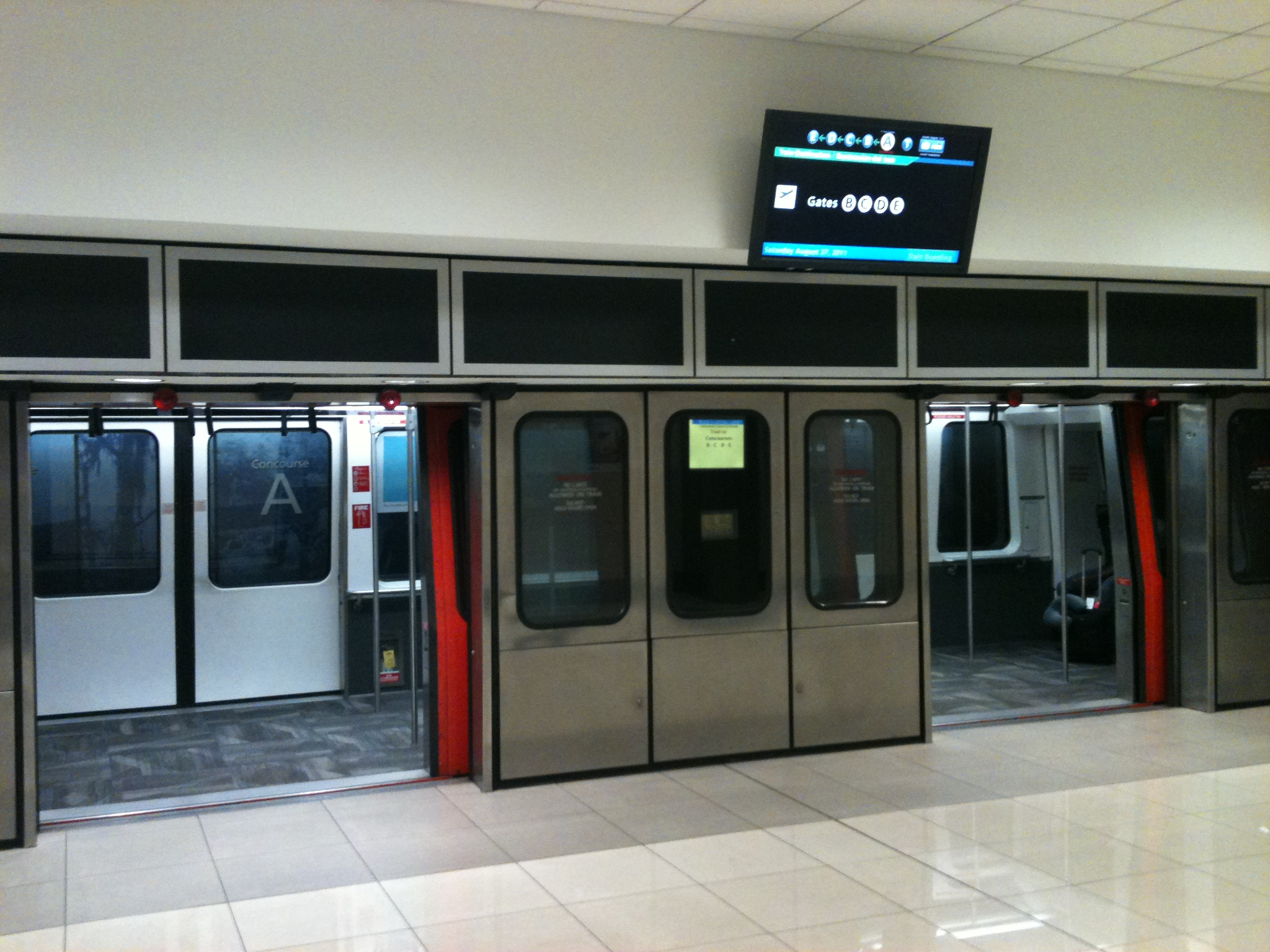
Platform for The Plane Train at ATL airport

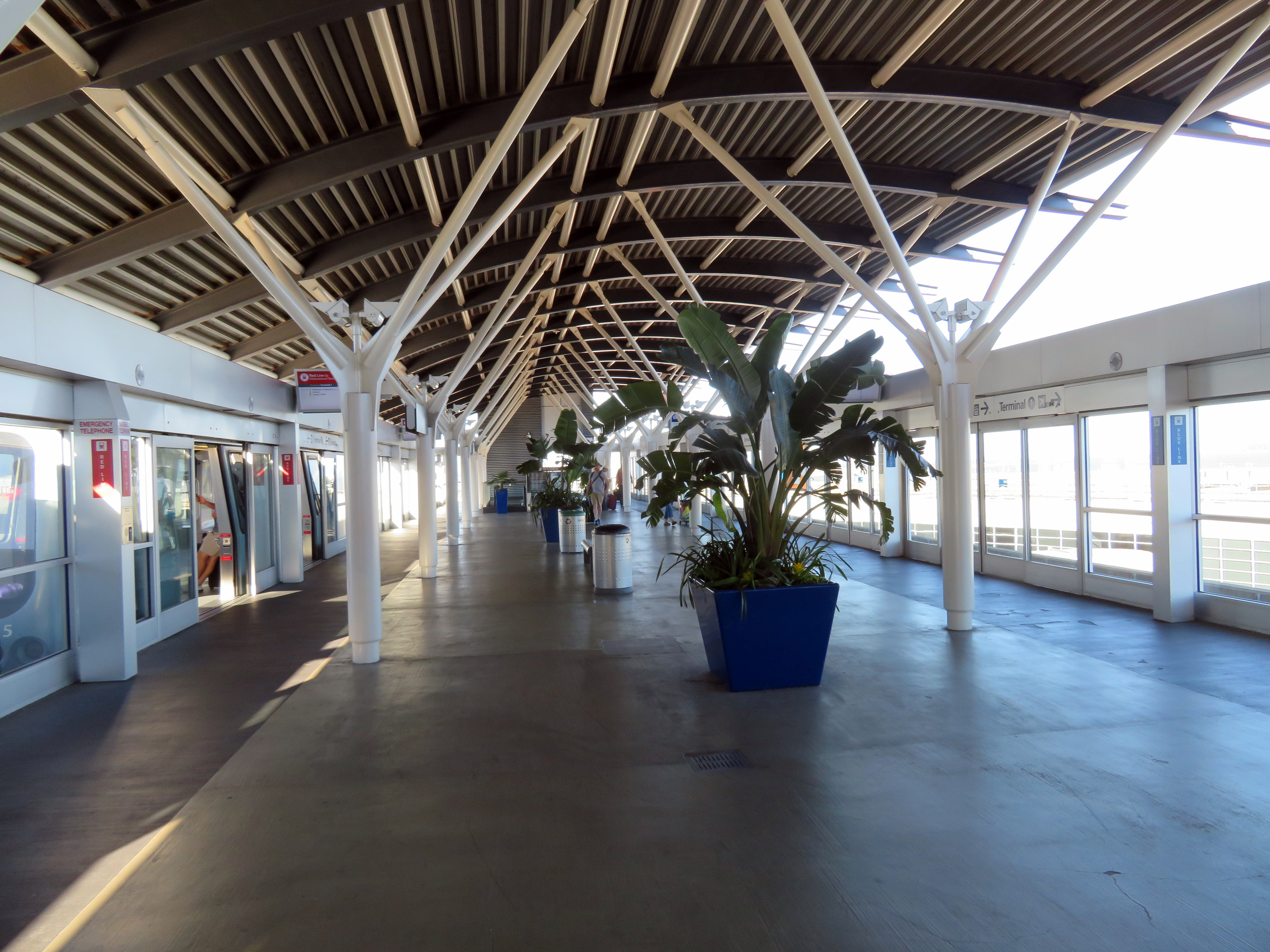
Interior of AirTrain station in Terminal 1 of the SFO airport

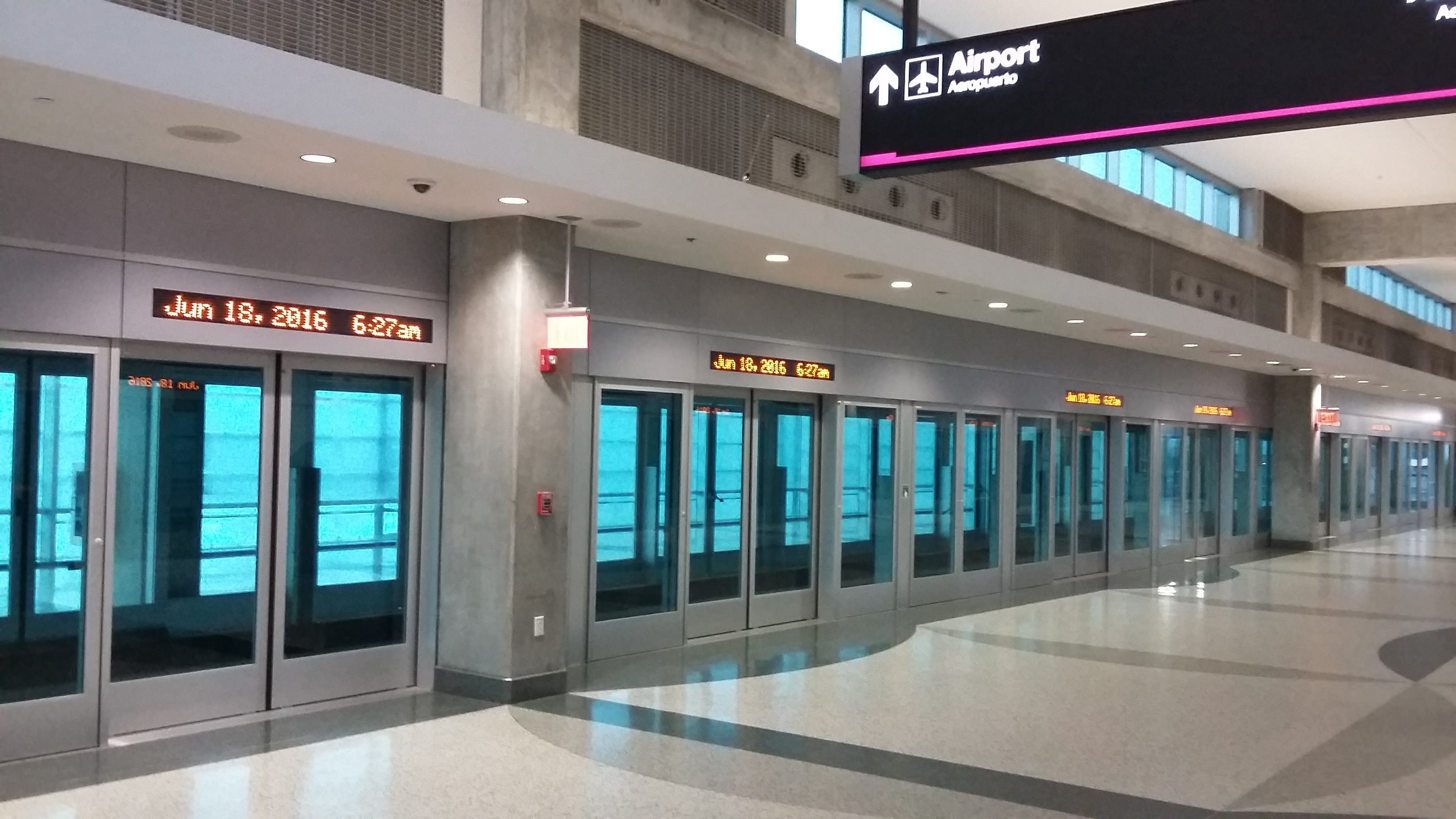
MIA Mover in Miami International Airport

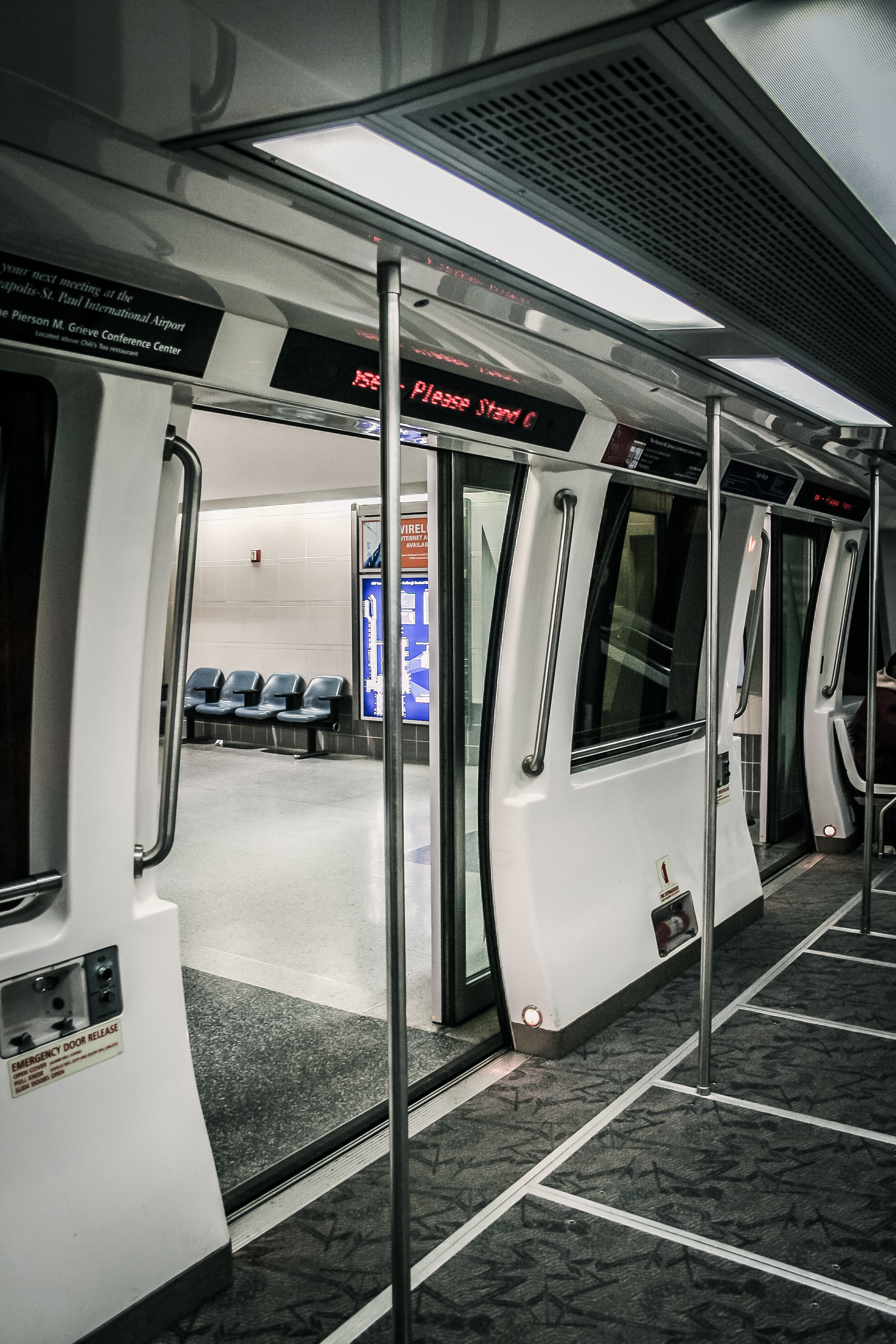
Platform screen doors on the MSP Airport trams

=== Venezuela ===
Platform screen doors are in use on the Los Teques Metro. The first station to have screen doors implemented on the system was Guaicaipuro.

=== Vietnam ===
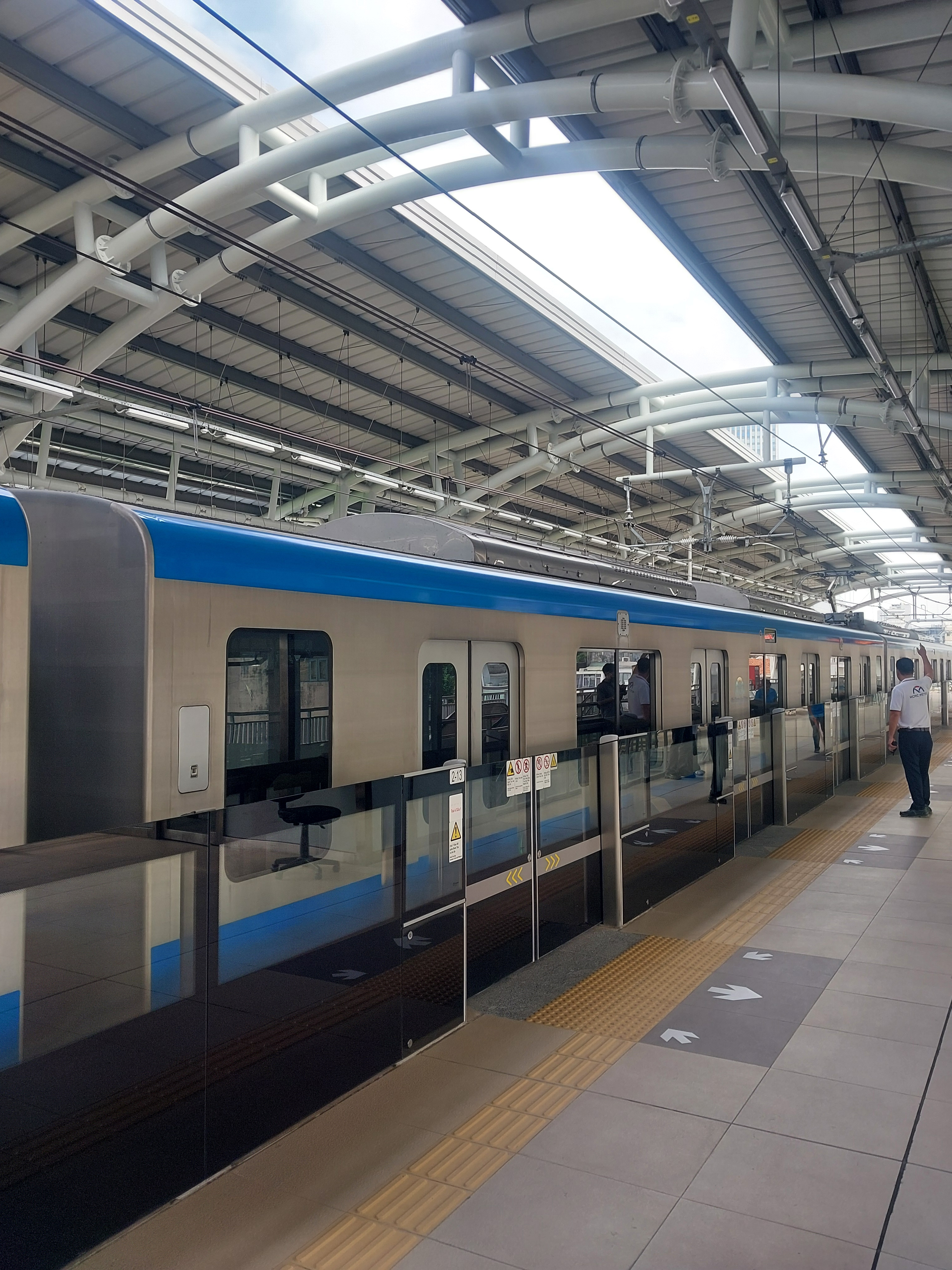
Half-height platform screen doors at Văn Thánh station of the Ho Chi Minh City Metro

Platform screen doors are currently used on the Ho Chi Minh City Metro, with full-height doors for underground stations and half-height doors for above-ground stations. The Hanoi Metro also uses platform screen doors.

== Incidents ==
On the Shanghai Metro in 2007, a man forcing his way onto a crowded train became trapped between the train door and platform door as they closed. He was pulled under the departing train and killed. In 2010, a woman in Shanghai's Zhongshan Park Station was killed under the same circumstances when she got trapped between the train and platform doors. An almost identical death occurred on the Beijing Subway in 2014‍—‌the third death involving platform doors in China within the several years preceding it. In 2018, a woman was similarly trapped between the platform doors and train at Shanghai's Bao'an Highway station. She escaped injury by standing still as the train departed. On 22 January 2022, an elderly woman was killed when she got trapped between the train doors and platform screen doors at Shanghai's Qi'an Road Station.

Between 1999 and 2012, London Underground's platform doors, all on the Jubilee line, were the cause of 75 injuries including strikes to people's heads and arms.

== See also ==
- Anti-trespass panels, another safety technology meant to keep people off rail tracks
- Guard rail
- Pedestrian railroad safety in the United States
- Platform barriers, platform screens doors without the doors
