= 2030 in rail transport =

This article lists events related to rail transport that are currently scheduled to occur in 2030. Please be aware that the actual dates on which these events occur may differ substantially from what is shown here.

== Events ==
=== January ===
- (Greece) – Line 4 of the Athens Metro is scheduled to open between Alsos Veikou and Goudi.

=== June ===
- (Bangladesh) – Joydebpur-Ishwardi railway is modernised.

=== November ===
- – Orange Line of the Bangkok MRT extends to Thailand Cultural Centre from Pracha Songkhro.

=== December ===
- (Bangladesh) – Line 4 of the Dhaka Metro Rail is scheduled to open between Kamalapur and Madanpur.
- (Oman) – Gulf Railway is scheduled to open between Kuwait City and Muscat.
- (Sweden) – West Link Section of the West Coast Line extends to Korsvagen from Haga.

=== Unknown date ===
- (Azerbaijan) – Green Line of the Baku Metro extends to Y-14 from Khatai.
- (Azerbaijan) – Green Line of the Baku Metro extends to Y-15 from Y-14.
- (Azerbaijan) – Green Line of the Baku Metro extends to Y-16 from Y-15.
- (Azerbaijan) – Green Line of the Baku Metro extends to Y-16 from Y-17.
- (Azerbaijan) – Extension of the Purple Line from 8 November to Babek Avenue 6 stations.
- (Azerbaijan) (Turkey) – Baku–Ankara Railway (via Nakhchivan) is scheduled to open.
- (Bangladesh) – Dhaka Circular Railway is scheduled to open between Tongi and Bashundhara.
- (Bangladesh) – Line 2 of the Dhaka Metro is scheduled to open between Gabtoli and Narayanganj.
- (Bangladesh) – Line 5 Southern of the Dhaka Metro is scheduled to open between Gabtoli and Dasherkandi.
- (Belgium) – Line 62 of the Brussels Tramway Network extends to Airport from Eurocontrol.
- (Canada) – Capital Line of the Edmonton Light Rail extends to Heritage Valley North from Century Park.
- (Chile) – Line 9 of the Santiago Metro is scheduled to open between Bio-Bio and Plaza La Pintana.
- (Denmark) – M4 of the Copenhagen Metro extends from Orientkaj to Nordhavn C.
- (Egypt) – Greater Cairo-Abu Simbel High Speed Railway is scheduled to open between Cairo and Aswan.
- (France) – Line 17 of the Paris Metro is scheduled to open between Parc des Expositions and Le Mesnil-Amlot.
- (France) – Line 18 of the Paris Metro is scheduled to open between Christ de Saclay and Versailles Chantiers.
- (France) – Line T8 of the Lyon Tramway Network is scheduled to open between Vaulx-en-Velin and Venissieux.
- (Germany) – Line 5 of the Augsburg Tramway Network is scheduled to open between Augsburg Hauptbahnhof and University Hospital.
- (Germany) – Line 7 of the Cologne Tramway Network extends to Langel from Frechen.
- (Germany) – Line 17 of the Cologne Tramway Network extends to Bonn from Rodenkirchen.
- (Germany) – Fulda–Eisenach High Speed Railway of the Intercity Express is scheduled to open between Fulda and Eisenach.
- (Greece) – Eastern Egnatia Railway of the Hellenic Railways is scheduled to open between Thessaloniki and Alexandroupolis.
- – Tuen Ma Line of the Hong Kong MTR extends to Tuen Mun South from Tuen Ma.
- (Indonesia) – North Line of the Jakarta LRT is scheduled to open between Pesing and Rajawali.
- (Indonesia) – South East Line of the Jakarta LRT is scheduled to open between Velodrom and Klender.
- (Italy) – Brescia tramway network is scheduled to open.
- (Japan) – Blue Line of the Yokohama Subway extends to Shin-Yurigaoka from Azamino.
- (Lithuania) (Poland) – Bialystok-Kaunas Section of Rail Baltica is scheduled to open between Bialystok from Kaunas.
- – Line T1 of the Luxembourg Tramway Network extends to Foetz from Leudelange.
- (Mongolia) – Ulaanbaatar Tram is scheduled to open.
- (Poland) – SKM extends between Gdańsk Śródmieście and Kowale.
- (Portugal) – Porto–Lisbon high-speed rail line is scheduled to open between Porto and Lisbon.
- (Russia) – Line 2 of the Kazan Metro is scheduled to open between Tulpar and 100th Anniversary of the TASSR.
- (Russia) – Line 3 of the Saint Petersburg Metro extends to Kamenka from Begovaya.
- (Serbia) – Line 2 of the Belgrade Metro is scheduled to open between Bezanija and Mirijevo.
- – Cross Island Line of the Singapore MRT is scheduled to open between Aviation Park and Bright Hill.
- (Slovakia) – Zilina-Poprad Railway increases the speed of trains to 160 km/h from 110 km/h between Zilina and Poprad.
- – First bullet train in South Africa is launched between Pretoria to Musina.
- (South Korea) – Great Train eXpress B in Seoul is scheduled to open between Songdo and Maseok.
- (South Korea) – Line 5 of the Busan Metro extends to Noksan from Hadan.
- (South Korea) – Line 7 of the Seoul Subway extends to Pocheon from Goeup.
- (South Korea) – Nambunaeryuk High Speed Railway is scheduled to open between Gimcheon and Geoje.
- (Spain) – Line 11 of the Madrid Metro extends to Conde de Casal from Plaza Elíptica.
- (Spain) – Madrid–Extremadura High Speed Railway extends to Toledo from Oropesa.
- (Spain) (Portugal) – Madrid–Lisbon High Speed Railway is scheduled to open.
- (Morocco) – Al Boraq High Speed Railway extends to Marrakesh from Casablanca.
- (Sweden) – Blue Line of the Stockholm Metro branches off to Nacka from Kungsträdgården.
- (Taiwan) – Red Line of the Kaohsiung Metro extends to Dapengwan Bay from Siaogang.
- (Turkey) – Konya-Antalya railway is scheduled to open.
- (Ukraine) – Line 4 of the Kyiv Metro is scheduled to open between Zatoka Desenka and Sudnobudivna.
- (United Kingdom) – Oxford-Cambridge Railway extends to Cambridge from Bedford.
- (United Kingdom) – Northern Trains begin to receive their batch of 450 new trains to replace their dated BR class 150, British Rail Class 156 and the remainder of their sprinter fleet.
- (United Kingdom) – Docklands Light Railway extension to Thamesmead opens.
- (United Kingdom) (Germany) (Switzerland) – Eurostar starts passenger services from London to Frankfurt and Geneva.
- (United Kingdom) – Bakerloo line of the London Underground completes its replacement of rolling stock.
- (United States) – Altamont Corridor Express branches off to Union City from Fremont.
- (United States) – Altamont Corridor Express extends to Merced from Lanthrop/Manteca.
- (United States) – Red Line of the Chicago "L" extends to 130th Street from 95th/Dan Ryan.
- (United States) – Valley Metro Rail of the Phoenix Valley Metro Rail extends to Interstate 17 from 15th Avenue.
- (United States) – Honolulu Skyline extends to Kaʻākaukukui from Kahauiki.
