= Korsvägen station =

Railway station in Gothenburg, Sweden

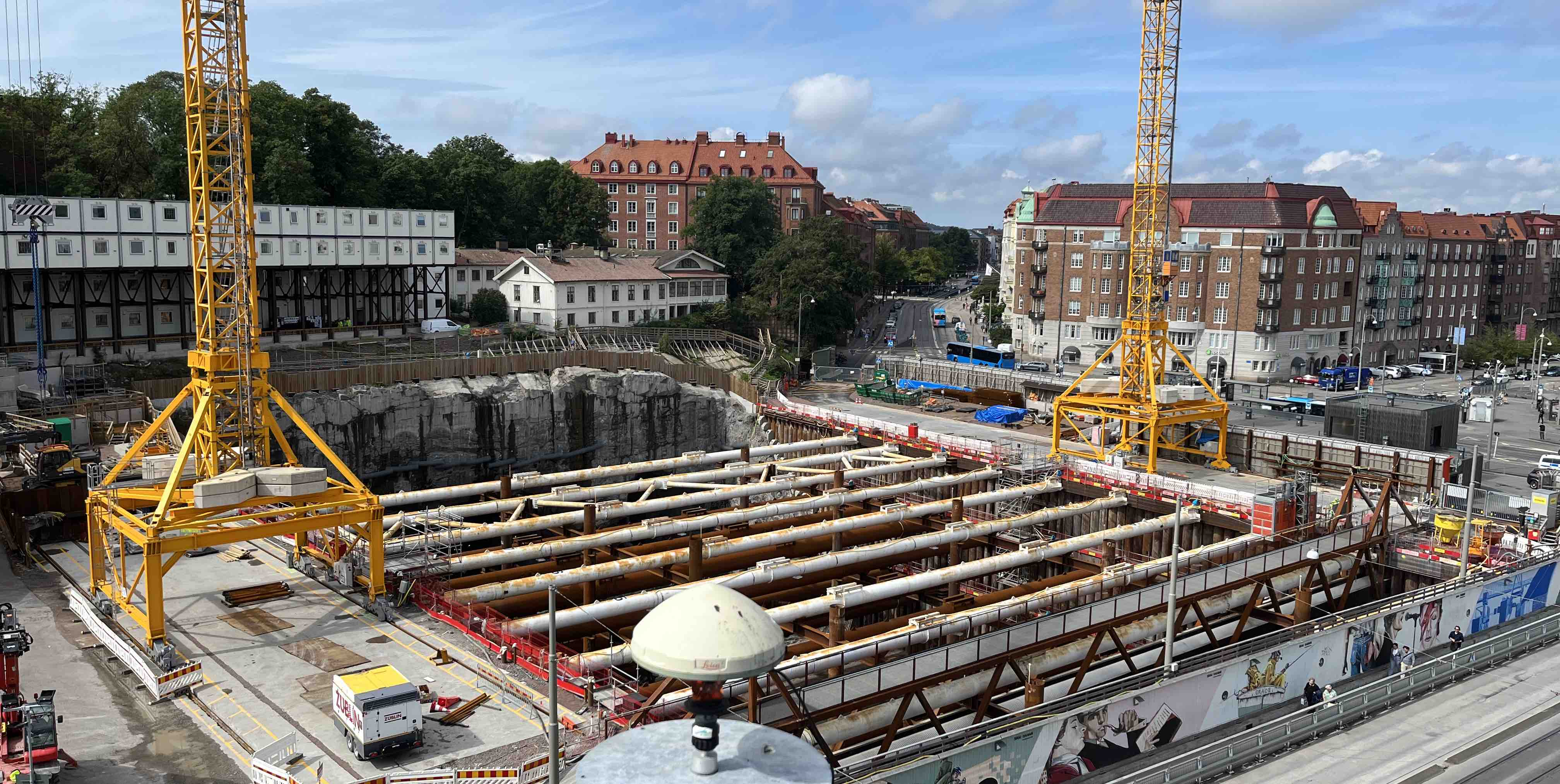
- Construction progress at the western entrance (Summer 2023)

General information
- Location: Gothenburg; Sweden
- Coordinates: 57°41′46″N 11°59′14″E
- Owner: Swedish Transport Administration (Infrastructure)
- Line: West Link
- Platforms: 2
- Tracks: 4
- Connections: Trams: Lines 2, 4, 5, 6, 8, 13; Bus

Construction
- Structure type: Underground
- Depth: 20 m (66 ft)
- Accessible: Yes

Other information
- Status: Under construction, opening in 2030

History
- Opening: December 2030
Location

Korsvägen station is a railway station currently under construction in Gothenburg, Sweden. Designed to serve both commuter trains and regional trains as part of the West Link project, the station is named after the Korsvägen intersection, which has been a key tram stop since the 1880s and has served as a hub for trams heading in five directions since the early 2000s. Korsvägen station is expected to open in 2030, alongside Haga station following the completion of the entire West Link tunnel to Centralen station.

== Infrastructure and entrances ==
Korsvägen station will be located 20 meters below ground, and will feature two platforms and four tracks. The station will be accessible from three main entrances: one towards Liseberg, another towards the Korsvägen tram stop, and a third leading to the University of Gothenburg and Näckrosdammen.

Korsvägen station will be located underneath the Korsvägen intersection, close to attractions such as Universeum, Museum of World Culture, Liseberg, Svenska Mässan, Gothia Towers and Scandinavium.

== Gallery ==
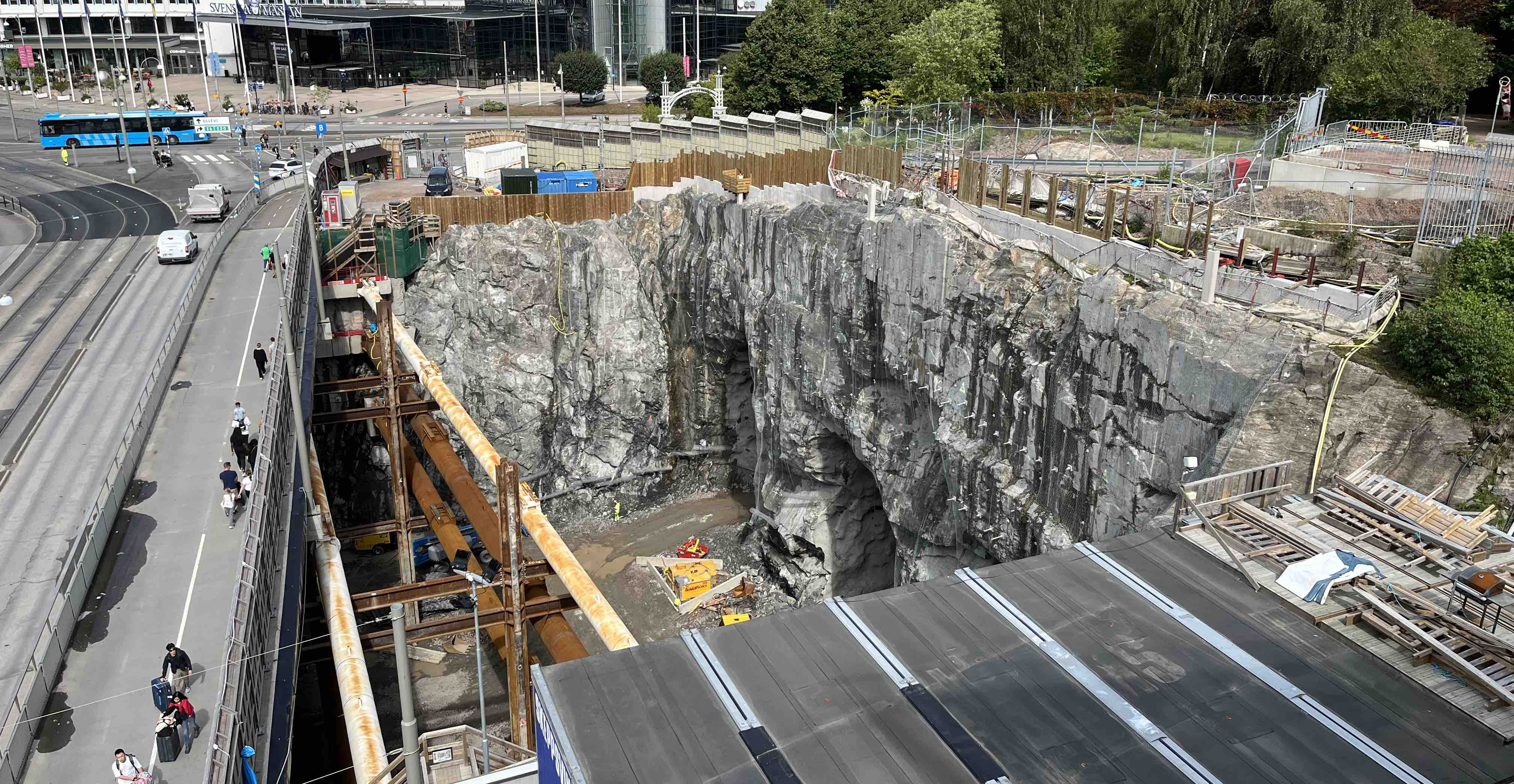
Eastern entrance leading to Liseberg

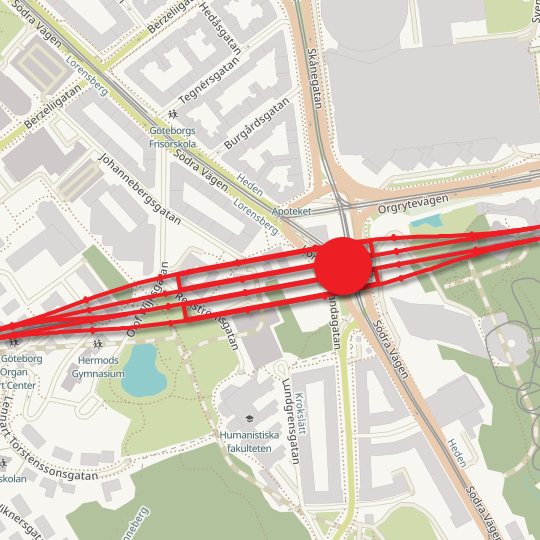
Station Map

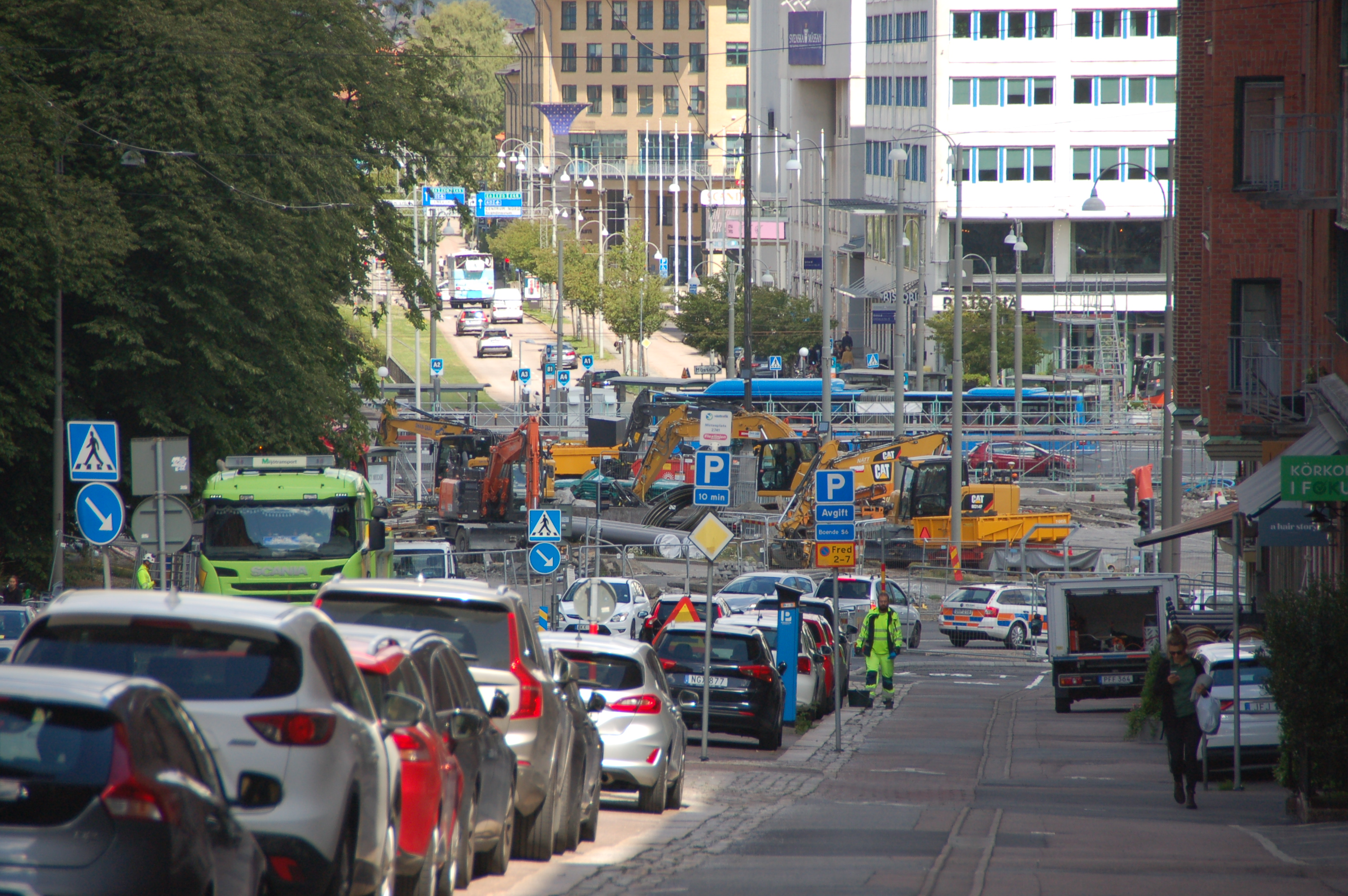
Works in 2020
