= Ullevi =

Multi-purpose stadium in Gothenburg, Sweden

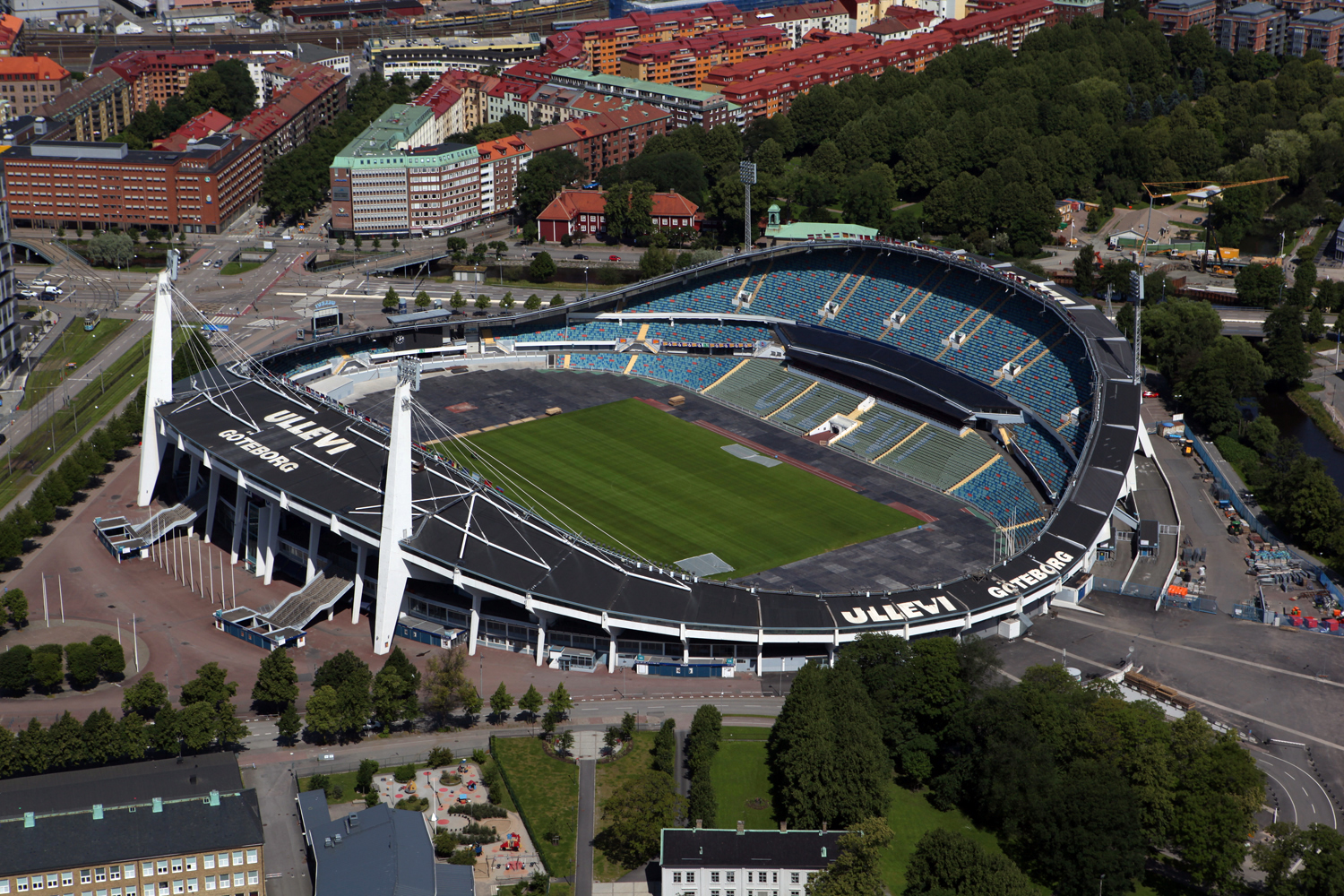
- UEFA
- Interactive map of Ullevi
- Location: Gothenburg, Sweden
- Coordinates: 57°42′21″N 11°59′14″E
- Owner: Higab
- Operator: Got Event
- Capacity: 43,000; 75,000 for concerts
- Surface: Grass
- Field size: 105 × 66 m

Construction
- Opened: 29 May 1958
- Architects: Sten Samuelsson and Fritz Jaenecke

Ullevi, sometimes known as Nya Ullevi (Swedish: [(ˈnŷːa) ˈɵ̂lːɛˌviː], New Ullevi), is a multi-purpose stadium in Gothenburg, Sweden. It was built for the 1958 FIFA World Cup, but since then has also hosted the World Allround Speed Skating Championships six times; the 1995 World Championships in Athletics and the 2006 European Athletics Championships; the UEFA Cup Winners' Cup finals in 1983 and 1990; the UEFA Euro 1992 final, the UEFA Cup final in 2004; and annually hosted the opening ceremony of the Gothia Cup, the world's largest football tournament in terms of the number of participants. IFK Göteborg has also played two UEFA Cup finals at the stadium, in 1982 and 1987, but then as "home game" in a home and away final. The stadium has hosted several events, including football, speedway, ice hockey, boxing, racing, athletics and concerts.

The stadium is one of the biggest in the Nordic countries, with a seating capacity of 43,000 and a total capacity of 75,000 for concerts.

== History ==
=== Sport ===
The ground opened for the 1958 FIFA World Cup held across Sweden. It hosted four matches in Group D, including a play-off. It also held a quarter-final, a semi-final and the third-place match. The stadium's record attendance for football is 52,194, set on 3 June 1959 when Örgryte IS played against IFK Göteborg. The stadium hosted the 1983 European Cup Winners' Cup Final, which saw Scotland's Aberdeen defeat Spanish giants Real Madrid 2–1 after extra time. It also hosted the first leg of the 1987 UEFA Cup Final between IFK Göteborg and Dundee United of Scotland. The hosts won the game 1-0 thanks to a goal from Stefan Pettersson. The Swedish side would go on to lift the trophy for the second time in their history after a 1–1 draw at Tannadice Park, Dundee in the second leg.

It was also the venue for the first game between National Football League teams to be played on the European continent, organised by Swedish motor company Volvo. In a pre-season game on 14 August 1988, the Minnesota Vikings won 28–21 against the Chicago Bears. The 1990 European Cup Winners' Cup Final was also held at the stadium. It saw Sampdoria of Italy defeat Anderlecht of Belgium 2-0 after extra-time.

Ullevi held three Group B matches at UEFA Euro 1992 as well as a semi-final, and the final itself on 26 June in which Denmark won the trophy against Germany. The 2004 UEFA Cup Final was held at the stadium on 19 May of that year. Valencia of Spain defeated Marseille of France, 2–0. The annual Världsungdomsspelen (translation: World Youth Games) track and field competition is held at the stadium and the mass event has around 3000 athletes competing each year.

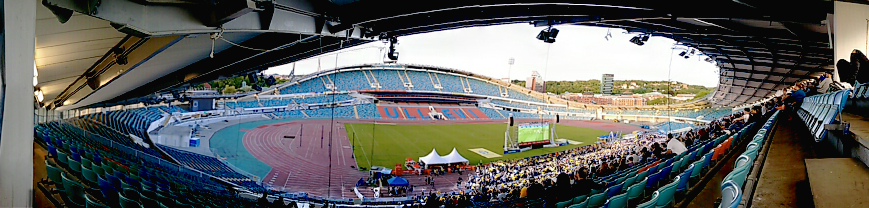
Ullevi stadium, 23 June 2018

=== Music ===
Ullevi nearly collapsed during a Bruce Springsteen concert on 8 June 1985 due to the rhythmic movement of tens of thousands of people in the audience and the clay soil on which the stadium is built. The concert also caused nearly £3 million in damages, while David Bowie's Glass Spider Tour in June 1987 was relocated from Ullevi to Eriksberg because of fears about the safety of the structure. Since then, the concrete pillars supporting the stadium have been extended down to the bedrock. Springsteen has performed at the stadium on subsequent tours in 2003, 2008, 2012, 2016, and 2023.

Pink Floyd performed at Ullevi on 27 August 1994 as part of their The Division Bell Tour. Michael Jackson came to Ullevi on 16 August 1997, as part of his HIStory World Tour, performing for a crowd of 50,000 people. Elton John hosted a sell-out concert in 1998. It was part of the Face-To-Face Tour with Billy Joel, although Joel was unable to perform because of illness. John played for over three hours. Tina Turner came to Ullevi on 0 August 1996, as part of her Wildest Dreams Tour and 5 August 2000, as part of her Twenty Four Seven Tour with a sold-out crowd of 55,180.

The "big four" of thrash metal (Slayer, Anthrax, Megadeth and Metallica) played in the stadium on 3 July 2011. U2 have performed at the stadium four times: the first occasion was on 2 August 1997 during their PopMart Tour, in front of a crowd of 46,658 people. The second was on 29 July 2005 during their Vertigo Tour, in front of a sold-out crowd of 58,478 people. The third and the fourth were on 31 July and 1 August 2009 during their U2 360° Tour, in front of a total sold-out crowd of 119,297 people. The performance of "The Unforgettable Fire" from the first 2009 show was recorded for the group's live album U22.

Foo Fighters performed at the venue on 12 June 2015 on the Sonic Highways World Tour. However, Dave Grohl fell off stage during the second song of the concert, breaking his leg. He was treated in the stadium before returning to the stage to continue the rest of the concert sitting down in a chair while a medic applied a cast. Despite Grohl's injuries, the band was able to complete the concert.

Iron Maiden performed at the stadium five times. The first was on 9 July 2005 during their Eddie Rips Up the World Tour. The second time was on 26 July 2008 during their Somewhere Back in Time World Tour. The third time was on 1 July 2011 during The Final Frontier World Tour. The fourth time was on 17 June 2016 during The Book of Souls World Tour. The fifth time was on 22 July 2022 as a part of Legacy of the Beast Tour before more than 60,000 fans.

The Swedish artist Håkan Hellström has in 2014, 2016 and 2022 broken the attendance record thanks to a small stage which gave room for more spectators.

The Gothenburg-raised artist Laleh became the first Swedish female to headline Ullevi, with a concert held on her 40th birthday on 10 June 2022. When the tickets were released, 15,000 were sold in the first hour. The concert, which featured orchestration from the Gothenburg Symphony Orchestra, was broadcast on SVT1 on 2 January 2023 and made available on SVT Play on 28 December 2022. An accompanying documentary directed by Sara Aren going behind the scenes of the concert preparations was also broadcast on SVT2 on 30 December 2022 under the title Laleh – välkommen hem. She played a second concert at Ullevi on 26 August 2023 as part of a national summer tour.

=== Innovation ===
In March 2007, Ullevi installed what was then one of Sweden's largest solar power plants, consisting of 600m² of photovoltaic panels situated on the roof of the luxury boxes section. The peak power is 86.4 kW and the yield is supposed to cover the total power used by the artificial lighting for events, with a surplus.

== Speedway ==
Ullevi has also hosted Motorcycle speedway and hosted the Speedway World Championship on no less than eight occasions, second only to the old Wembley Stadium in London, England which hosted the World Final a record 26 times. The track is a dirt surface laid out over the athletics track and is officially 404 metres (442 yards) long with a track record of 69.4 seconds (4 laps clutch start).

The first Championship World Final to be held at Ullevi was the inaugural Speedway World Team Cup competition in 1960. Led by reigning world champion Ove Fundin and his teammates Olle Nygren, Rune Sörmander and Björn Knutson, Sweden swept to victory over England, Czechoslovakia and Poland. Ullevi would have to wait 26 years before World Team Cup competition returned with the stadium hosting the first round of the three round 1986 Final.

The first ever Individual World Final staged at Ullevi was in 1964 when New Zealand's Barry Briggs won with a 15-point maximum. The largest attendance for a World Final at Ullevi occurred in 1974 when 38,390 turned out to see Sweden's own Anders Michanek win his only World Championship with an unbeaten 15 point maximum. No World Championship winners at Ullevi dropped more than one point in their five rides with five of the seven World Finals being won with a 15-point maximum. The stadium also hosted other qualifying rounds for the Individual World Final including the inaugural running of the Intercontinental Final in 1975 won by New Zealand legend Ivan Mauger.

Since the World Championship was changed in 1995 from a single meeting Final to the Speedway Grand Prix (SGP), Ullevi has hosted a round of the series in 2002, 2003, 2004 (Grand Prix of Scandinavia), 2008, 2009, 2010 and 2011 (Grand Prix of Sweden).

Ullevi hosted its only World Pairs Championship Final in 1983 when Peter Collins and Kenny Carter won England's 6th Pairs crown.

=== Speedway World Finals ===
==== Individual World Championship ====
- 1964 - (New Zealand) Barry Briggs - 15pts
- 1968 - (New Zealand) Ivan Mauger - 15pts
- 1971 - (Denmark) Ole Olsen - 15pts
- 1974 - (Sweden) Anders Michanek - 15pts
- 1977 - (New Zealand) Ivan Mauger - 14pts
- 1980 - (England) Michael Lee - 14pts
- 1984 - (Denmark) Erik Gundersen - 14pts
- 1991 - (Denmark) Jan O. Pedersen - 15pts

==== World Pairs Championship ====
- 1983 - England (Peter Collins / Kenny Carter) - 25pts

==== World Team Cup ====
- 1960 - Sweden (Ove Fundin / Olle Nygren / Rune Sörmander / Björn Knutson) - 44pts
- 1986* - Denmark (Hans Nielsen / Erik Gundersen / Tommy Knudsen / Jan O. Pedersen / John Jørgensen) - 130pts

* Ullevi hosted the first of 3 rounds in the Final.

=== Speedway Grand Prix ===
- 2002 Speedway Grand Prix of Scandinavia - (Australia) Leigh Adams
- 2003 Speedway Grand Prix of Scandinavia - (Australia) Ryan Sullivan
- 2004 Speedway Grand Prix of Scandinavia - (Denmark) Hans N. Andersen
- 2008 Speedway Grand Prix of Sweden - (Poland) Rune Holta
- 2009 Speedway Grand Prix of Sweden - (Russia) Emil Sayfutdinov
- 2010 Speedway Grand Prix of Sweden - (Denmark) Kenneth Bjerre
- 2011 Speedway Grand Prix of Sweden - (Australia) Chris Holder
- 2012 Speedway Grand Prix of Sweden - Fredrik Lindgren
- 2013 Speedway Grand Prix of Sweden - (Russia) Emil Sayfutdinov

== Record attendances ==
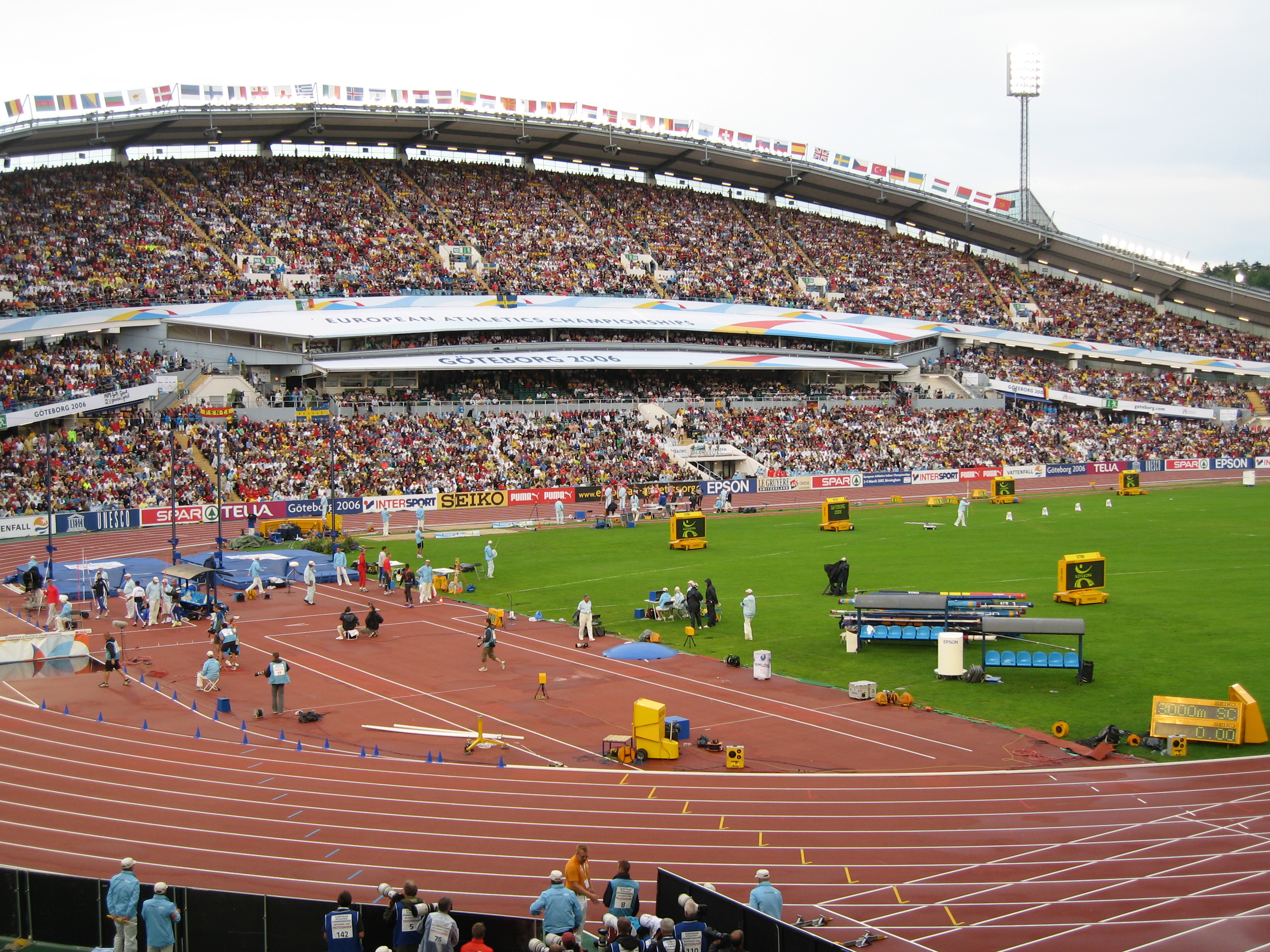
The east stand of Ullevi during the 2006 European Athletics Championships

=== Most attended concerts ===
#	Event	Attendance	Date
1	(Sweden) Håkan Hellström	70,144	5 June 2016
2	(Sweden) Håkan Hellström	70,091	4 June 2016
3	(Sweden) Håkan Hellström	69,349	7 June 2014
4	(United Kingdom) Ed Sheeran +–=÷x Tour	67,383	10 August 2022
5	(United States) Bruce Springsteen; Wrecking Ball Tour	66,561	28 July 2012
6	(United Kingdom) Coldplay; A Head Full of Dreams Tour	66,249	26 June 2017
7	(United States) Bruce Springsteen; Wrecking Ball Tour	66,018	27 July 2012
8	(United Kingdom) Coldplay; A Head Full of Dreams Tour	65,427	25 June 2017
9	(Sweden) Håkan Hellström; Rullande Åska	65,000	29 July 2017
10	(United States) Bruce Springsteen; The River Tour 2016	64,959	23 July 2016
11	(United States) Bruce Springsteen; Born in the U.S.A. Tour	64,312	8 June 1985
12	(United States) Guns N' Roses; Not in This Lifetime... Tour	64,289	21 July 2018
13	(Sweden) Håkan Hellström; Rullande Åska	63,788	28 July 2017
14	(United Kingdom) Ed Sheeran ÷ Tour	63,500	10 July 2017
15	(United Kingdom) Ed Sheeran ÷ Tour	63,500	11 July 2017
16	(United States) Metallica; WorldWired Tour	63,348	9 July 2019
17	(United States) Metallica; 2015 European Tour	63,000	22 August 2015
18	(United States) Bruce Springsteen; The River Tour 2016	62,701	27 June 2016
19	(United States) Bruce Springsteen; The River Tour 2016	62,676	25 June 2016
20	(United Kingdom) Ed Sheeran +–=÷x Tour	62,631	11 August 2022
21	(United States) Bruce Springsteen; Born in the U.S.A. Tour	62,544	9 June 1985
22	(United Kingdom) Iron Maiden; Legacy of the Beast World Tour	61,867	22 July 2022
23	(United Kingdom) Robbie Williams; Take the Crown Stadium Tour	61,449	20 July 2013
24	(United Kingdom) David Bowie; Serious Moonlight Tour	61,206	11 June 1983
25	(Republic of Ireland) U2; U2 360° Tour	60,099	1 August 2009
26	(United States) Madonna; Sticky & Sweet Tour	59,600	9 August 2009

=== Sports ===
One day events

#	Event	Attendance	Date
1	Ingemar Johansson – Eddie Machen; Boxing	53,614	14 September 1958
2	IFK Göteborg – Örgryte IS; Football	52,194	4 June 1959
3	Sweden – Denmark; Football	51,062	23 October 1960
4	Sweden – Göteborgsalliansen; Football	50,989	29 May 1958
5	Brazil – Soviet Union; Football	50,928	15 June 1958

Multi day events

#	Event	Attendance	Date
1	World Athletics Championships; Athletics	592,240	4–13 August 1995
2	European Athletics Championships; Athletics	269,038	6–13 August 2006
3	World Speed Skating Championships; Speed Skating	69,599	13–14 February 1971
4	Finnkampen; Athletics	51,567	4–5 September 2004
5	Finnkampen; Athletics	49,366	28–29 August 1971

== Location and transport ==
Ullevi is located on the eastern edge of Gothenburg's city centre and is one of the centrepieces of the event district Evenemangsstråket, with Scandinavium, Liseberg, Universeum, the Museum of World Culture and Bergakungen nearby. Public transport is easily accessible. There are two tram stops named after the stadium; Ullevi Norra (North) and Ullevi Södra (South). Both tram stops serve lines 6 (orange) and 8 (purple). Ullevi Södra also serves lines 12 (turquoise) and 13 (beige), while Ullevi Norra also serves lines 1 (white) and 3 (blue). Approximately 700 metres west of Ullevi lies the Gothenburg Central Station and Nils Ericson Terminal. 900 metres south of Ullevi lies Korsvägen, a major public transport hub which serves more than fifteen different bus lines and several tram lines, and the Liseberg station serving the Gothenburg commuter rail.

The stadium has 650 parking spaces located in a garage underneath the pitch. Additionally visitors are guided to eighteen nearby parking lots and parking garages—with a total of 7,000 parking spaces—by the event districts parking guidance and information system. The system has a total of 130 digital signs, located on motorways with information about which exit to use, and on streets in the city with more detailed information about directions and number of available parking spaces.

== See also ==
- Lists of stadiums

Preceded by Camp Nou; Barcelona	European Cup Winners' Cup; Final venue 1983	Succeeded by St. Jakob Stadium; Basel
Preceded by Wankdorf Stadium; Bern	European Cup Winners' Cup; Final venue 1990	Succeeded by De Kuip; Rotterdam
Preceded by Olympiastadion; Munich	UEFA European Championship; Final venue 1992	Succeeded by Wembley Stadium; London
Preceded by Gottlieb-Daimler-Stadion; Stuttgart	IAAF World Championships in Athletics; Main venue 1995	Succeeded by Olympic Stadium; Athens
Preceded by Estadio Olímpico de Sevilla; Seville	UEFA Cup; Final venue 2004	Succeeded by Estádio José Alvalade; Lisbon
Preceded by Olympiastadion; Munich	European Athletics Championships; Main venue 2006	Succeeded by Estadi Olímpic Lluís Companys; Barcelona
