= Universeum =

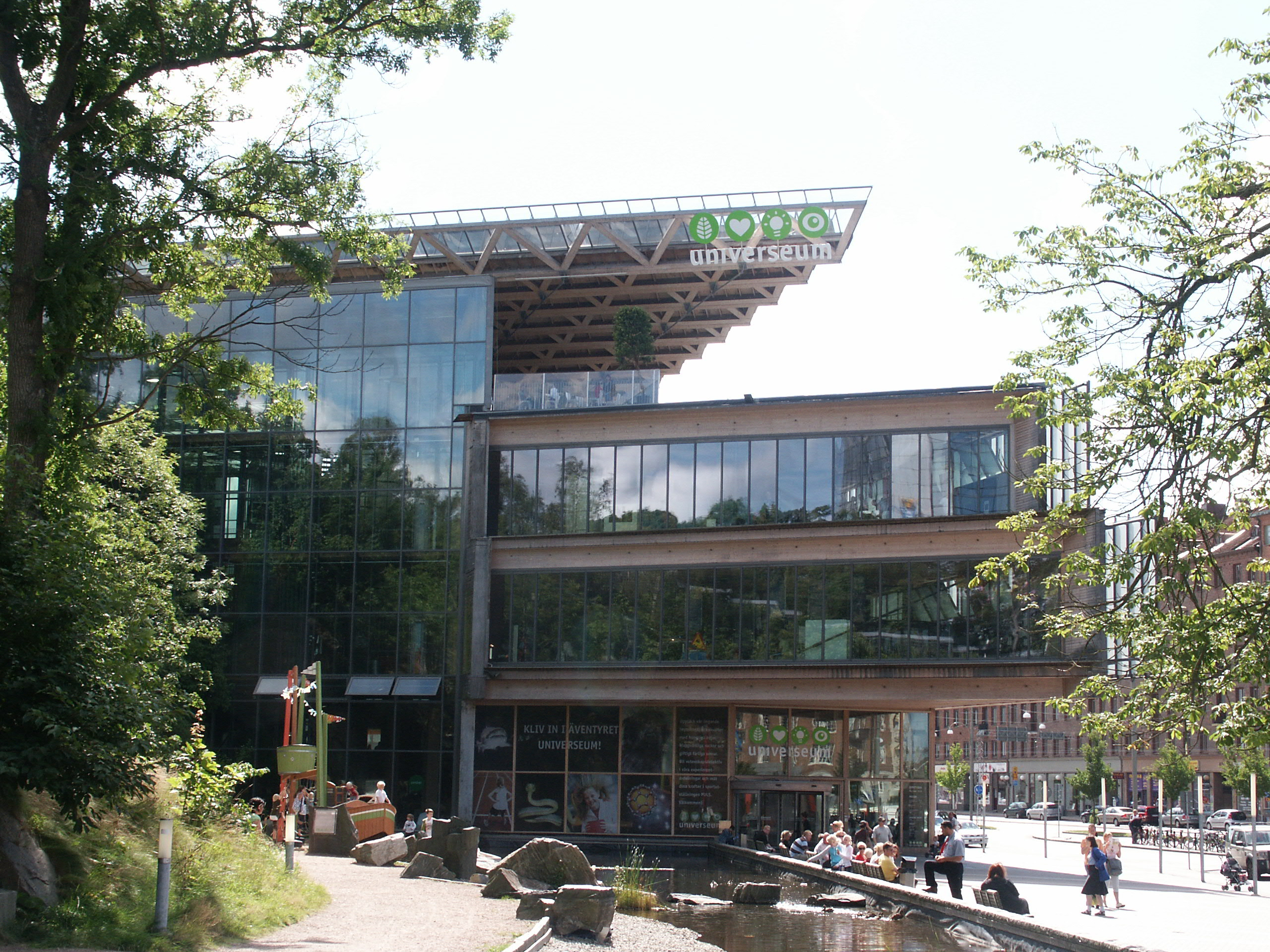
- Established: 2001
- Location: Gothenburg, Sweden
- Coordinates: 57°41′44.18″N 11°59′20.67″E
- Type: Public science centre, including zoo and aquarium; Museum
- Website: www.universeum.se

Universeum is a public science centre, zoo and public aquarium in Gothenburg, Sweden that opened in 2001. It is a part of Evenemangsstråket, the thoroughfare of events – close to Korsvägen and Skånegatan – which includes sights of interest like Scandinavium, Ullevi, Svenska Mässan (Swedish Exhibition Centre), Liseberg and the Museum of World Culture.

Universeum is divided into six sections, each containing experiment workshops and some of them with exhibits for reptiles, fish, insects and other animals. Universeum occasionally gives Swedish secondary school students a chance to debate with Nobel Prize-winners and professors.

== Main sections ==
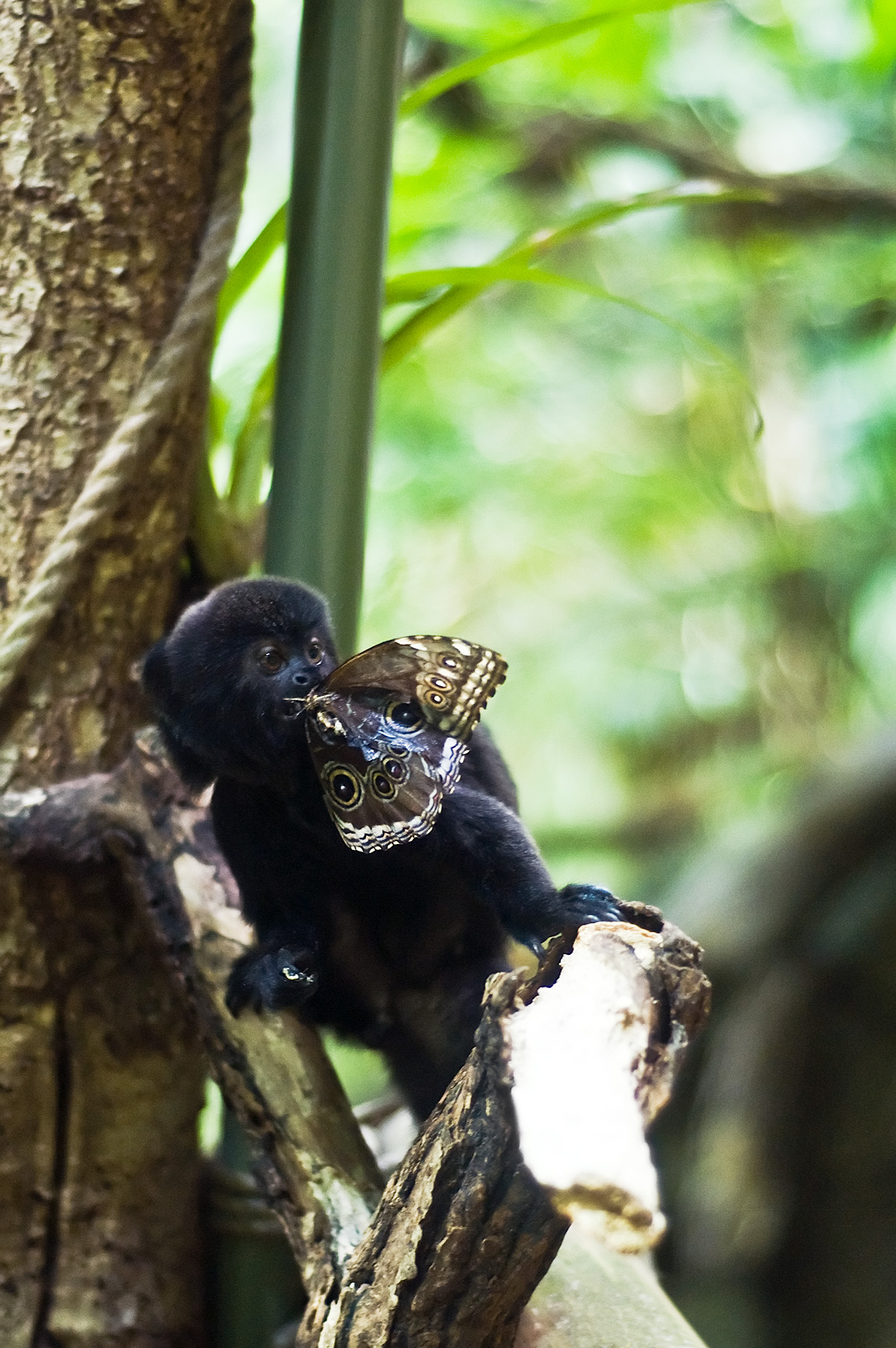
Goeldi's marmoset run free in the Regnskogen area.

The sections of Universeum are:

- "Kalejdo" - An exhibit about Crime-investigation, laser, space, and more.
- "Explora" - An experiment department that is mostly about humans and technology.
- "Vattnets Väg" (Water's Way) - The Swedish fresh and brackish water fishes, reptiles and voles.
- "Akvariehallen" (The Ocean Zone) - Marine animals. This includes a 1,400,000 litres (370,000 US gal) Ocean Tank with sharks and other tropical fish, a 16 metres (52 ft) long aquarium with native marine fish, and a touch tank with rays.
- "Regnskogen" (The Rainforest) - A rainforest hall with tropical animals.
- "Dödliga Skönheter" (Deadly Beauties) - Deadly and venomous reptiles.

The architect behind Universeum is Gert Wingårdh.

== See also ==
- The International Science Festival in Gothenburg
- List of science centers#Europe
