= Centralen station =

Railway station in Gothenburg, Sweden

Centralen station Station Centralen
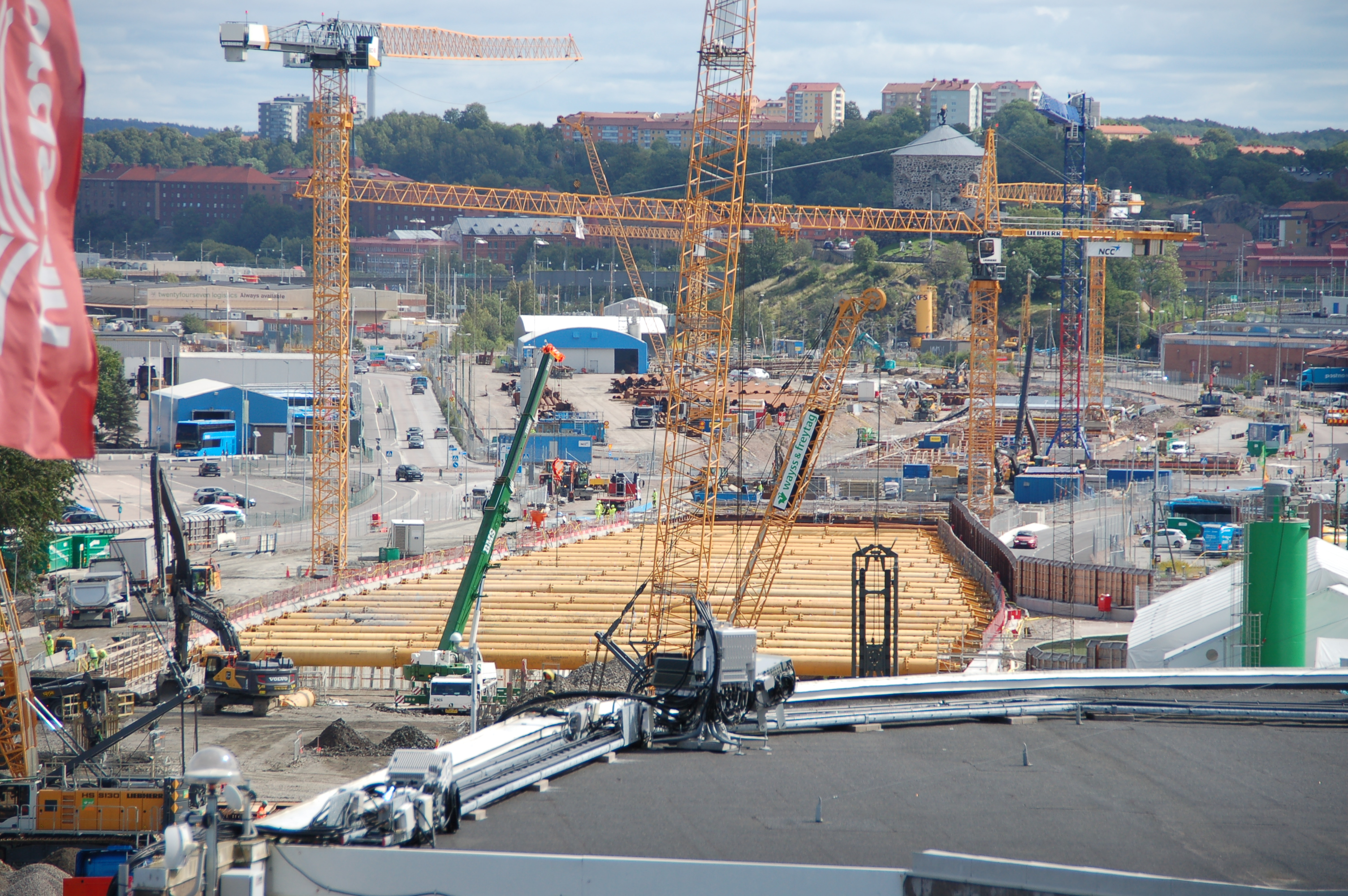
- Construction in 2020

General information
- Location: Gothenburg; Sweden
- Coordinates: 57°42′40.1″N 11°58′20.8″E
- Owner: Trafikverket (Station infrastructure); Jernhusen (Upper station building)
- Line: West Link
- Platforms: 2
- Tracks: 4

Construction
- Structure type: Underground
- Depth: 12 m (39 ft)
- Accessible: Yes

History
- Opening: December 2026
Location

Centralen is a railway station under construction in Gothenburg, Sweden, expected to open in 2026 as part of the West Link tunnel. It is adjacent to Gothenburg Central Station and Nils Ericson Terminal bus station.

== Infrastructure ==
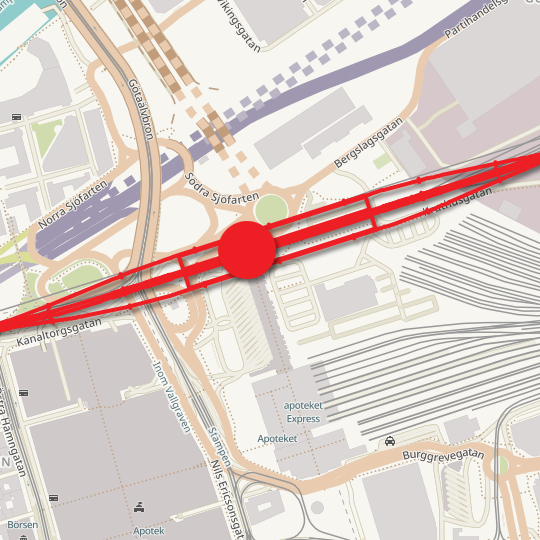
Station Location

Centralen station will be located underground, to the north of Gothenburg's existing central station. Centralen will include two island platforms and four tracks, situated approximately 12 meters below ground. The platform area will be 250 meters long and 60 meters wide.

The project is being managed by the Swedish Transport Administration, with construction agreements involving several contractors. Planning permission for the station itself was granted in January 2021, and construction began in 2024. The station is scheduled to open in December 2026, initially as a terminus, and in 2030 as a through-station with services continuing to Haga and Korsvägen stations when West Link is complete.

Centralen is designed to increase capacity on the railway network around Gothenburg by diverting trains from the existing central station and later supporting additional through-traffic generated by West Link's new double-track tunnel.

== Station Buildings ==
Centralen station will feature three primary entrances. An eastern entrance will lead up into Park Central, a new office building adjacent to Regionens Hus, while a western entrance will include two access points: one in Nordstan and another near Lilla Bommen. The largest and most prominent entrance will be located within a new building called Gothenburg Grand Central. This station and office building will connect directly to the existing central station via the Nils Ericson Terminal bus station.

=== Gothenburg Grand Central ===
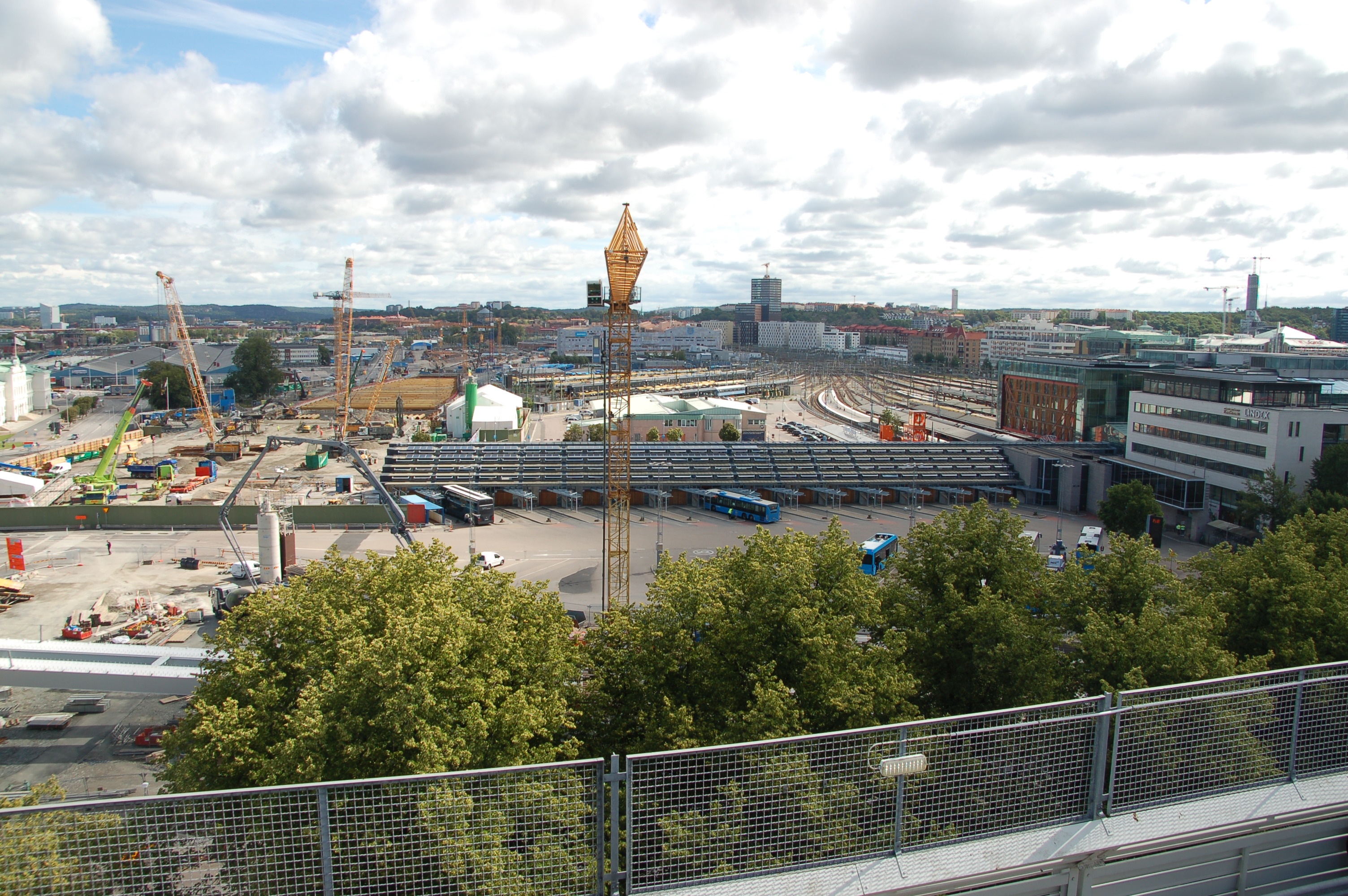
The Gothenburg Grand Central entrance will be located to the North of Nils Ericson Terminal

The largest of three entrances for Centralen station will be Gothenburg Grand Central. Jernhusen is the sole owner of the building and finances the full construction cost of 870 million SEK. The upcoming station was designed by Norwegian Reiulf Ramstad Arkitekter and will be built by PEAB. Gothenburg Grand Central started construction on 10 July 2024 and is expected to open in two phases – late 2026, together with the West Link tunnel, and early 2027.

The new Gothenburg Grand Central building will be 15,000 square metres (160,000 ft^{2}) in area, with 1,400 square metres (15,000 ft^{2}) reserved for convenience shops and restaurants. Another 8,000 square metres (86,000 ft^{2}) will be offices designed for roughly 700 employees.

Public passenger areas will have a ceiling height of 8 metres (26 ft). The new building will also have a park on its roof aimed at promoting biodiversity of plants, insects and birds. The building has a wide range of environmentally sustainable solutions, e.g. its facades will be built using recycled bricks. The station is expected to quality for Breeam Outstanding. When the name was announced, it drew widespread criticism for being non-Swedish and allegedly pretentious.
