= Liseberg railway station =

Railway station in Gothenburg, Sweden

Liseberg
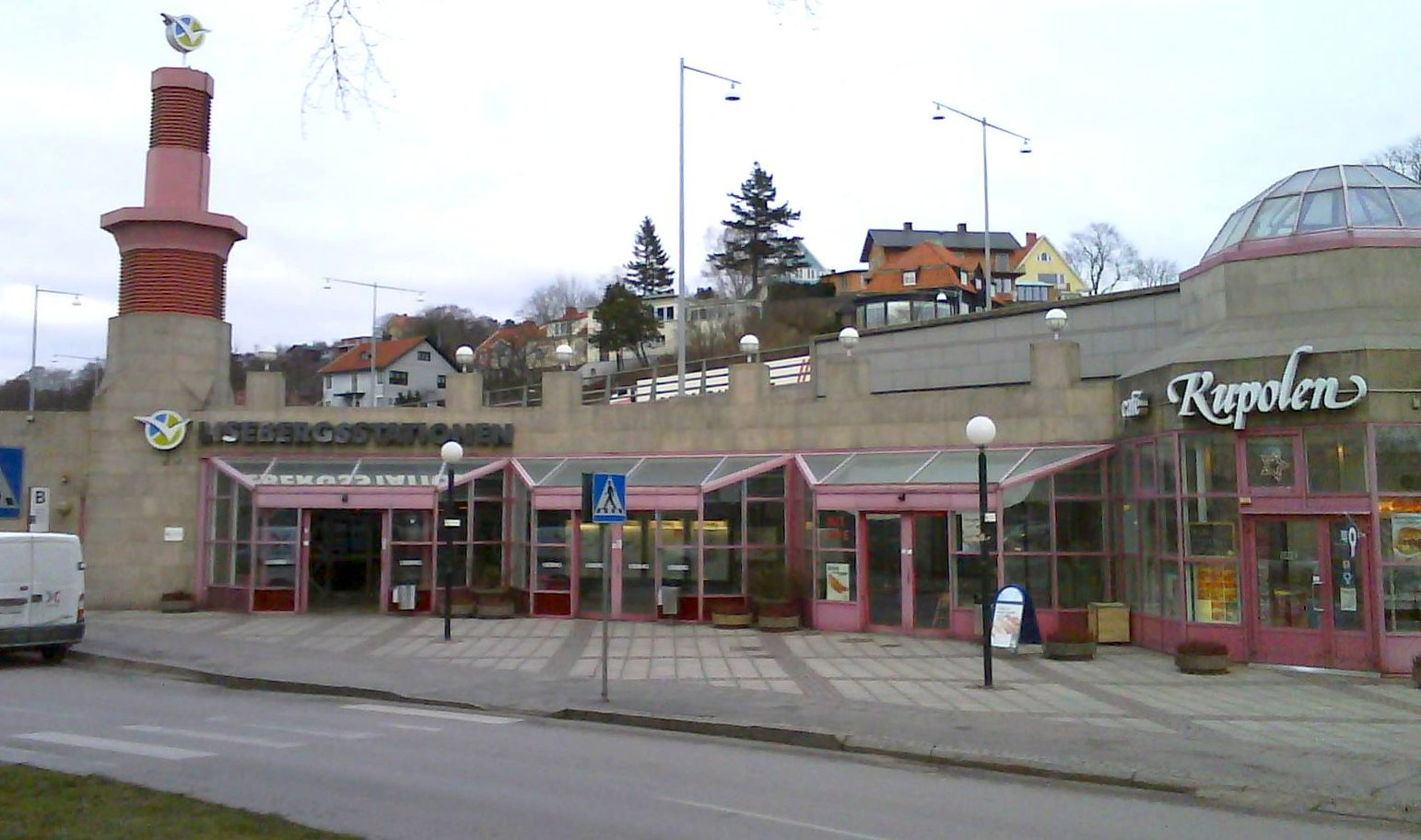

General information
- Location: Gothenburg; Sweden
- Coordinates: 57°41′54″N 11°59′42″E
- Operator: Trafikverket
- Line: West Coast Line
- Tracks: 2

Construction
- Structure type: Underground

History
- Opened: 21 April 1993
Location

The Liseberg station is an underground railway station in Gothenburg, Sweden. It is named after the amusement park Liseberg which is located nearby. The station was completed in 1993. Local trains to and from Kungsbacka and Borås stop at the station.

The nearest stops for local traffic are the tram stop Liseberg 80 metres (260 ft) south, and the major intersection Korsvägen, 500 metres (1,600 ft) west.

The station may be closed from access in 2030 when the West Link is opened and all commuter trains will go through that link. Liseberg railway station could be a ghost station where trains pass through but none stop.

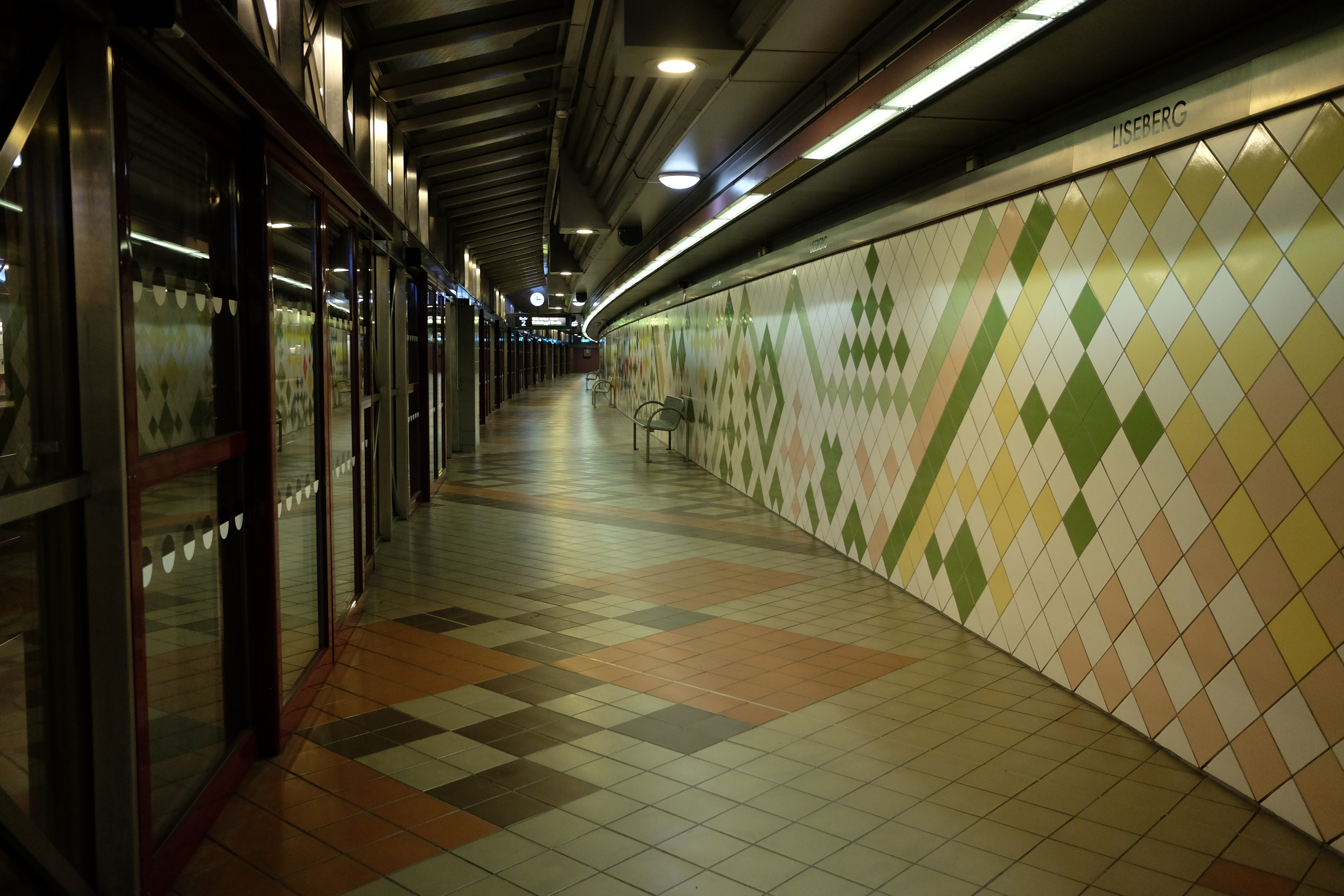
Platform of the underground station

Preceding station	Västtågen	Following station
Göteborg C Terminus	Gothenburg-Kungsbacka Line	Mölndal towards Kungsbacka
Göteborg C Terminus	Gothenburg-Borås Line	Mölnlycke towards Borås Central
