= Haga station (Gothenburg) =

Railway station in Gothenburg Municipality, Sweden

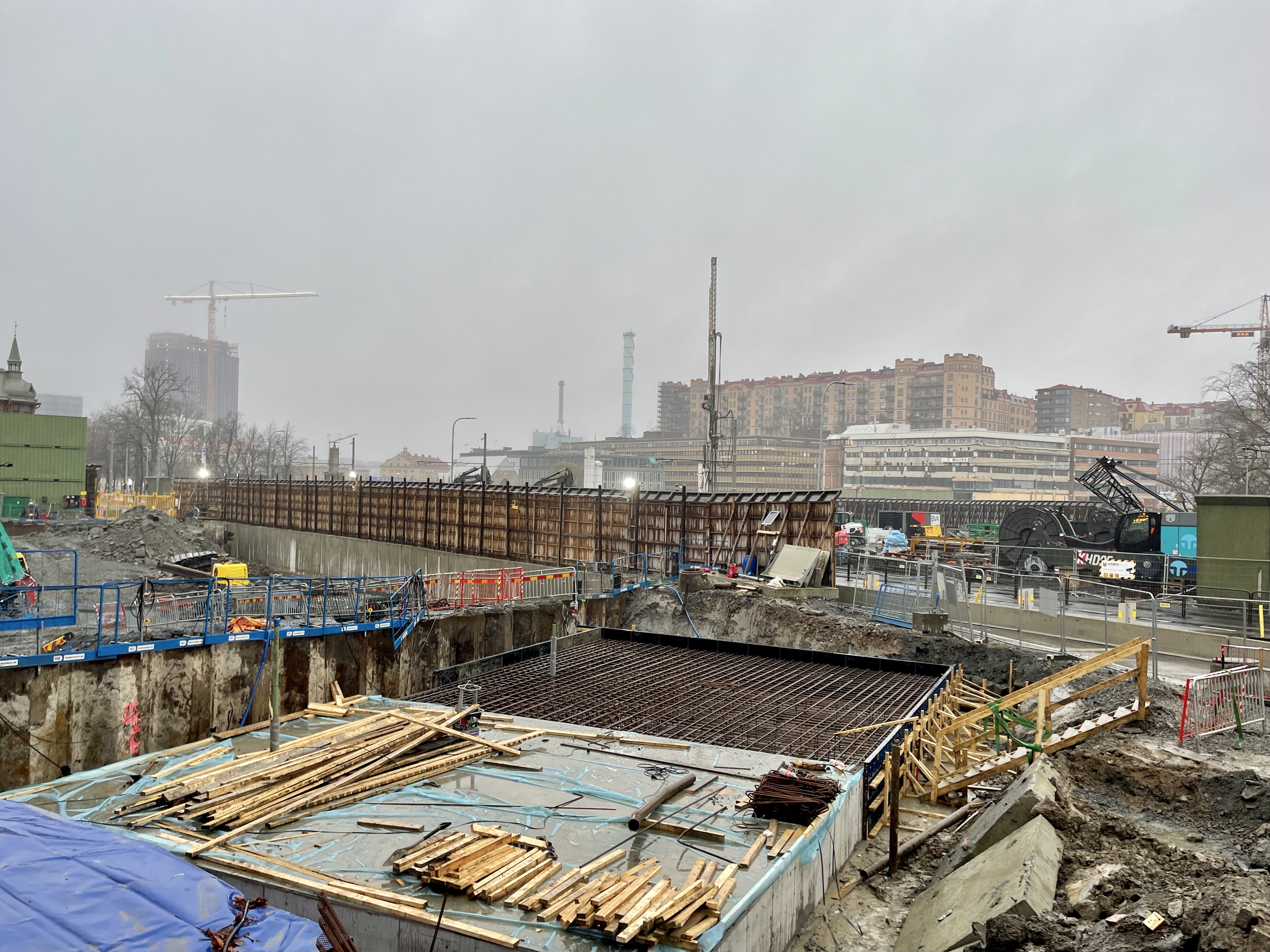
- Construction progress in 2021

General information
- Location: Gothenburg; Sweden
- Coordinates: 57°41′59″N 11°57′42″E
- Owner: Swedish Transport Administration (Infrastructure)
- Line: West Link
- Platforms: 2
- Tracks: 4
- Connections: Trams; Bus

Construction
- Structure type: Underground
- Depth: 30 m (98 ft)
- Accessible: Yes

Other information
- Status: Under construction, opening in 2030

History
- Opening: December 2030
Location

Haga station is a railway station currently under construction in Gothenburg, Sweden. Designed to serve both commuter trains and regional trains as part of the West Link project, it is expected to open in 2030, alongside Korsvägen station following the completion of the entire West Link tunnel to Centralen station.

Haga station will be located 30 meters below ground, and will feature two platforms and four tracks. The station will feature three entrances: one towards the Haga Church tram stop and the Haga district, one towards Pustervik, and one towards the Gothenburg School of Business, Economics and Law.

== Gallery ==
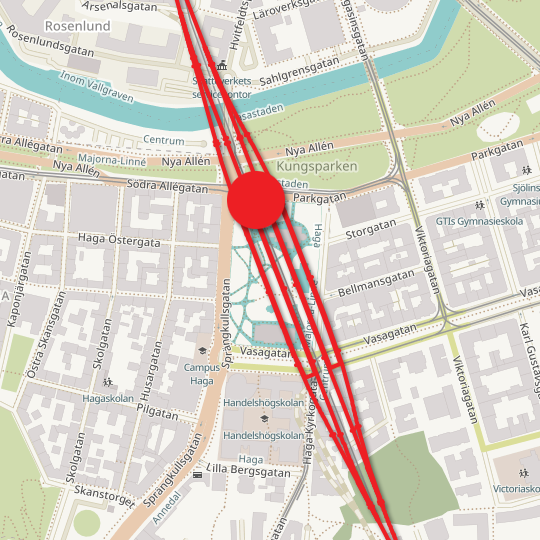
Station location

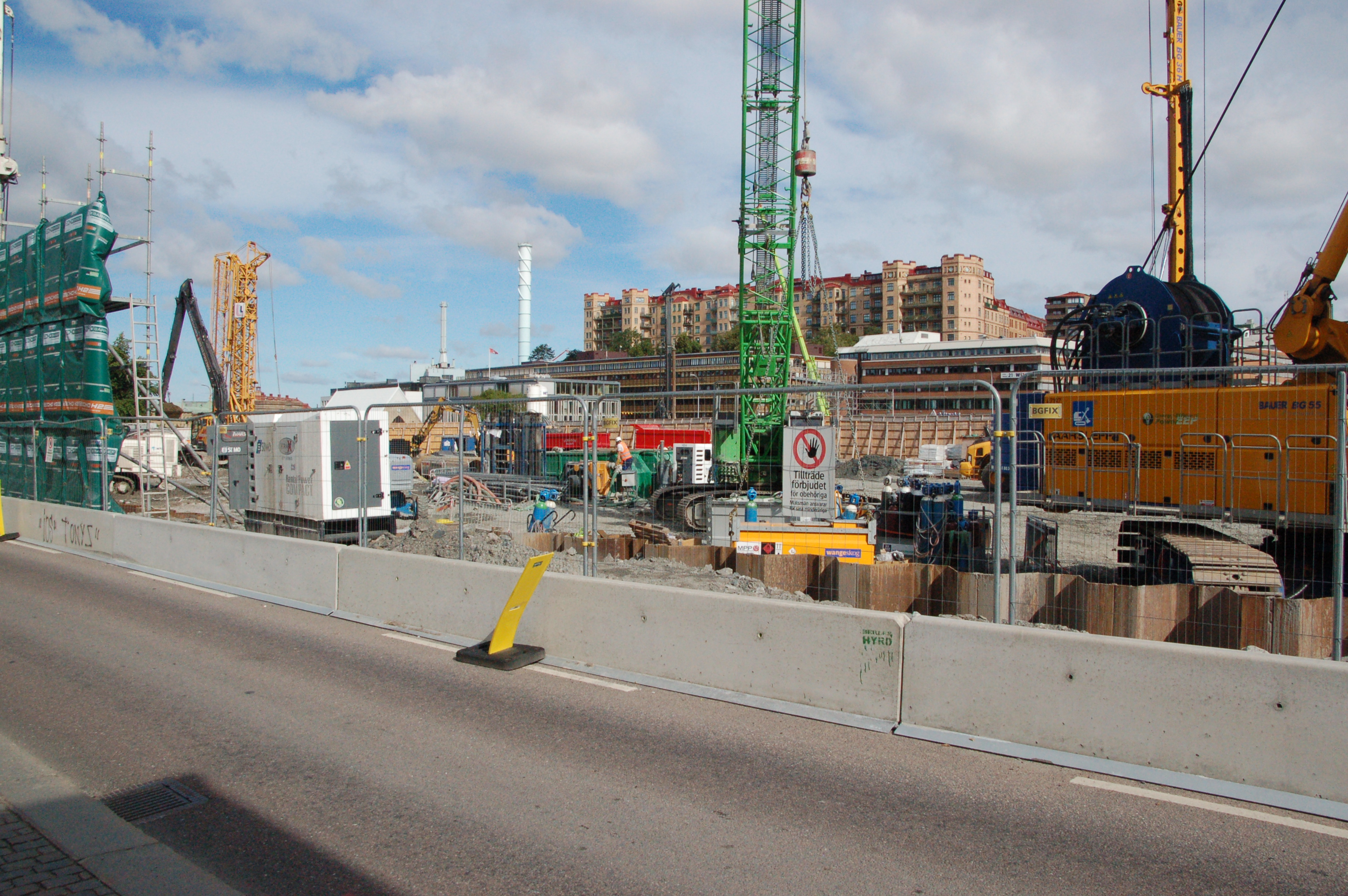
Construction in 2021
