= Nils Ericson Terminal =

Bus station in Gothenburg, Sweden

Coordinates: 57°42′36″N 11°58′21″E

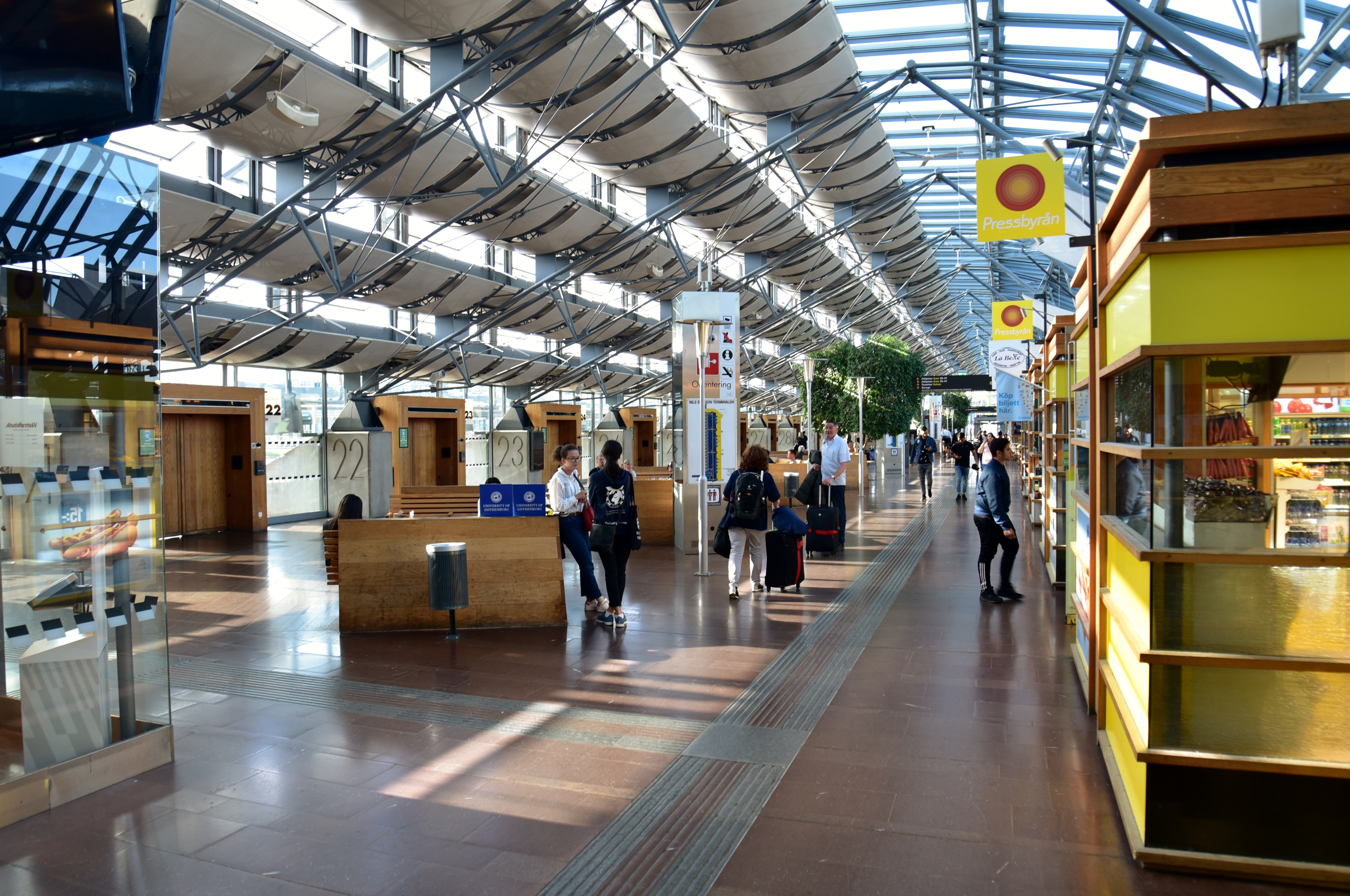
The Nils Ericson Terminal

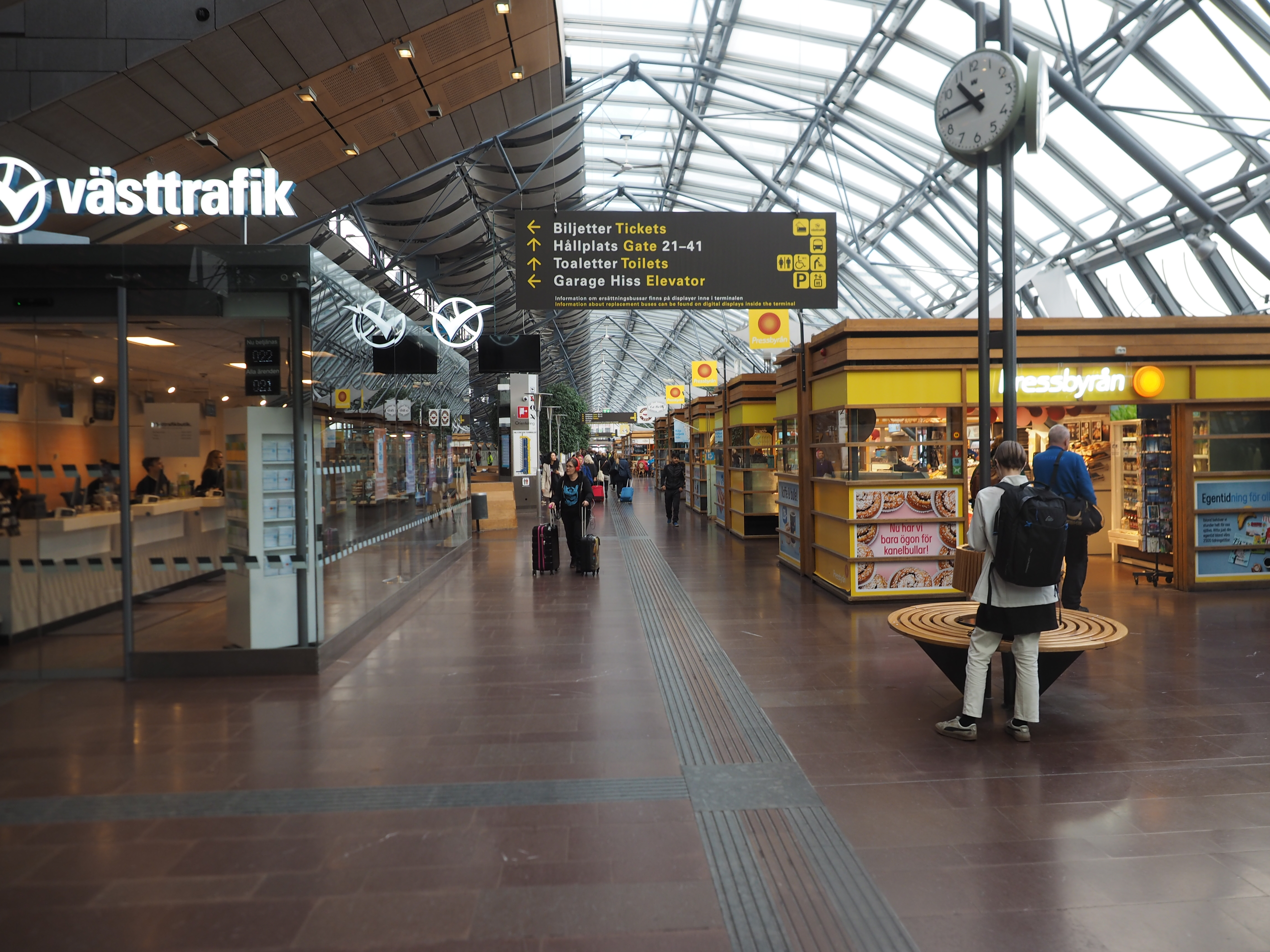
Another view of the Nils Ericson Terminal

The Nils Ericson Terminal is a major bus terminus in Gothenburg, Sweden built in 1995. It is adjacent to and interconnected with Gothenburg Central Station and will be joined to the upcoming Centralen station via the Gothenburg Grand Central building.

It is located in the city center, across the street from the Nordstan shopping center. The main shopping street and many hotels are within walking distance from the terminal.

The terminal serves many parts of the Västra Götaland County with bus traffic (although many regional destinations are primarily served by regional trains). Bus companies such as Flixbus, Bus4You, Nettbuss express, Swebus Express and Eurolines serve destinations such as Oslo, Stockholm and Copenhagen. With bus changes, a lot of destinations can be reached.

The bus terminal uses the modern system where buses arrive at gates, and the passengers enter the buses directly from the air-conditioned terminal, much like in modern airports. There are 18 gates indoors (numbered 21–38). There are also 11 gates outdoors with simple shelters (39–49). Terminal's total size is 5,000 square metres (54,000 ft^{2}).

The terminal is named after Nils Ericson, a Swedish inventor and mechanical engineer, and brother to John Ericsson.

The terminal was designed by the Norwegian architect, Niels Torp, and received the national Kasper Salin Prize in 1996.
