= Nambunaeryuk Line =

- Hangul: 남부내륙선
- Hanja: 南部內陸線
- RR: Nambunaeryukseon
- MR: Nambunaeryuksŏn

The Nambunaeryuk Line (Korean: 남부내륙선, lit. 'Southern Inland line') is a planned high-speed rail line between Gimcheon, North Gyeongsang Province and Geoje, South Gyeongsang Province. It is scheduled to open in 2030.

== Stations ==
Only Gimcheon and Geoje stations are confirmed as destinations on the line.

Station name			Transfer	Distance in km		Location	
Romanized	Hangul	Hanja	Transfer	Station distance	Total distance	Location	
Gimcheon	김천	金泉	Gyeongbu Line			Gyeongsangbuk-do	Gimcheon-si
Seongju	성주	星州				Gyeongsangbuk-do	Seongju-gun
Hapcheon	합천	陜川				Gyeongsangnam-do	Hapcheon-gun
Jinju	진주	晋州	Gyeongjeon Line			Gyeongsangnam-do	Jinju-si
Goseong	고성	固城				Gyeongsangnam-do	Goseong-gun
Tongyeong	통영	統營				Gyeongsangnam-do	Tongyeong-si
Geoje	거제	巨濟				Gyeongsangnam-do	Geoje-si

== Disputes and controversies ==
Legislators and other officials from urban areas in the region served are conflicting over station placement. For example, the Goryeong County government has encouraged a station to be built there based on the history of the area.

Originally, the line was planned to terminate at Gimcheon–Gumi station but was later shifted to Gimcheon, which is not currently served by a high-speed line. There are suspicions that National Assembly member Song Eon-seok advocated for the move because his family owns a commercial building across from the station.
