= Korsvägen =

Square in Gothenburg, Sweden

Coordinates: 57°41′50″N 11°59′13″E

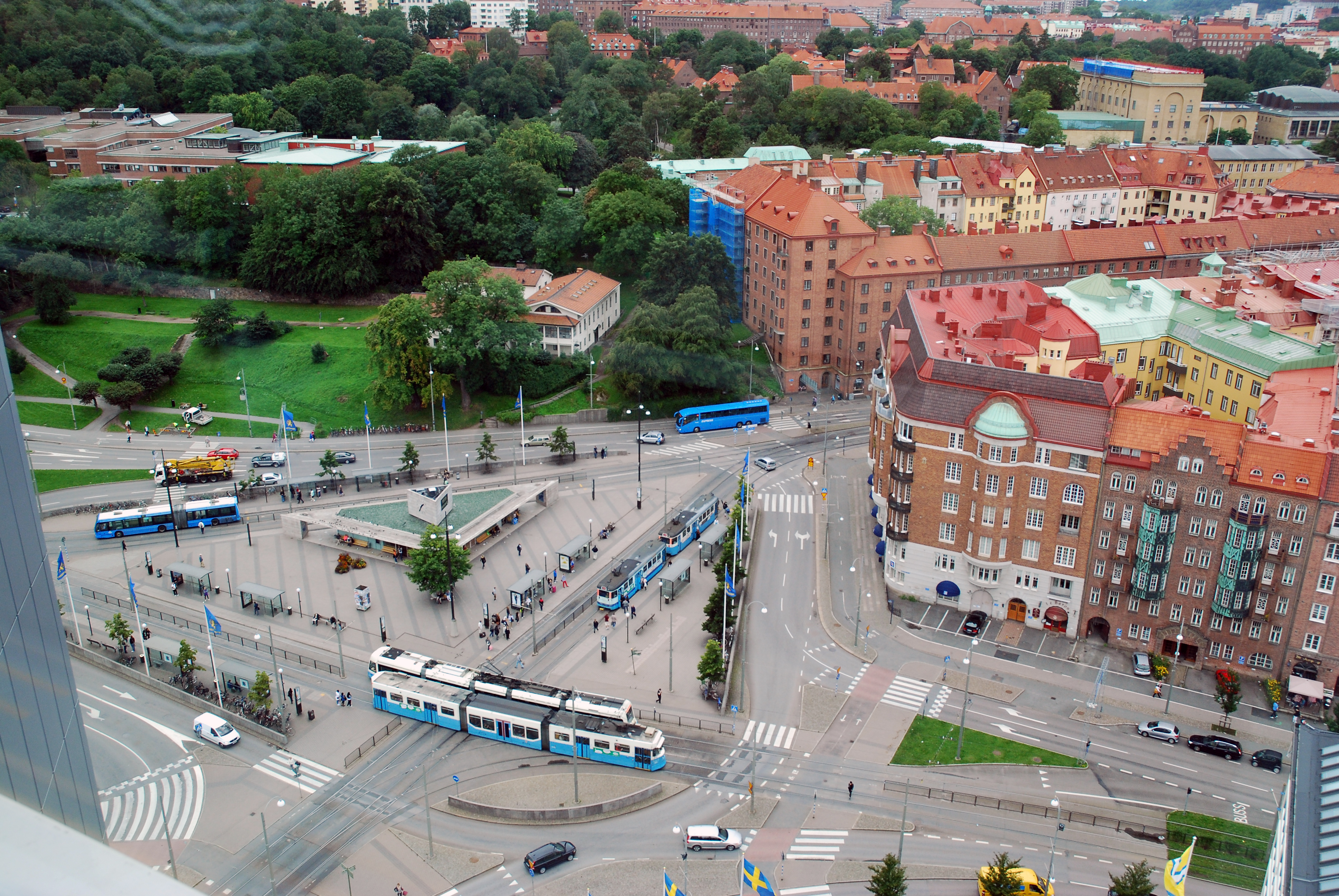
The traffic junction at Korsvägen

Korsvägen (literary "the cross road") is a public square and transport hub in the events district of Gothenburg, Sweden. Many important event venues and visitor attractions are located on or near Korsvägen, including the Swedish Exhibition and Congress Centre and Gothia Towers hotel, the Universeum science centre, the Museum of World Culture, Scandinavium and the amusement park Liseberg.

Major infrastructure work was carried out during the 1990s. Korsvägen is the hub of popular culture and events in Gothenburg in the same way as Götaplatsen is the cultural hub.

Korsvägen railway station is currently under construction 20 meters below Korsvägen as part of the West Link project.
