= Second line (Kazan Metro) =

Under construction since 2020

- System map with first section of second line in blue (with working names for the planned stations)

Overview
- Native name: Вторая линия
- Status: Under construction
- Locale: Kazan, Tatarstan, Russia
- Stations: 4 planned (first section); 12 planned (in total)

Service
- System: Kazan Metro

History
- Commenced: 2020
- Planned opening: 2027 (first section)

Technical
- Line length: 5.37 km (3.34 mi) (first section)

The second line (Russian: вторая линия) of the Kazan Metro has been under construction since 2020. There are four stations planned for the first section of the line: Zilant, Akademicheskaya, Tulpar, and 100th Anniversary of the TASSR.

In total, there are 12 stations planned for the line. The length of the first section with four stations is planned to be 5.37 km (3.34 mi) long. The second and third sections are planned to be 5.45 km (3.39 mi) and 9.37 km (5.82 mi) in length, respectively.

The opening of the first section of the line is planned for 2027.

== History ==
- April 2018 — beginning of geological exploration in the area where the future Akademik Sakharov St. station was expected to be.
- June 2018 — announcement of the working titles for the first four stations: Julius Fuchik St., 10th mikrorayon, 100th Anniversary of the TASSR, Akademik Sakharov St.
- February 2019 — Tatarstan government signed a contract for the working out of submittals for the first section of the line, which would consist of 4 stations and be 5.37 km (3.34 mi) long.
- 26th January 2020 — Rustam Minnikhanov, head of the Republic of Tatarstan, examined the construction process of the Akademik Sakharov St. station.
- 23rd April 2020 — beginning of tunneling excavation.
- 8th July 2020 — Rostekhnadzor prohibited further work due to the lack of a construction permit.
- 16th September 2020 — State Expertise issued an approval for the construction of the first section of the line.
- 26th March 2021 — the panel of judges were presented with 8 projects for the interior designs of the first 4 stations.
- February 2022 — an online poll was held to determine the names of the first four stations. From May to June a competition was held to determine the future interior design of the stations.
- 18th November 2025 — full completion of the interstation tunnels construction, including the headshunts behind the 100th Anniversary of the TASSR station.
