= Swedish Exhibition & Congress Centre =

Exhibition and convention centre in Gothenburg, Sweden

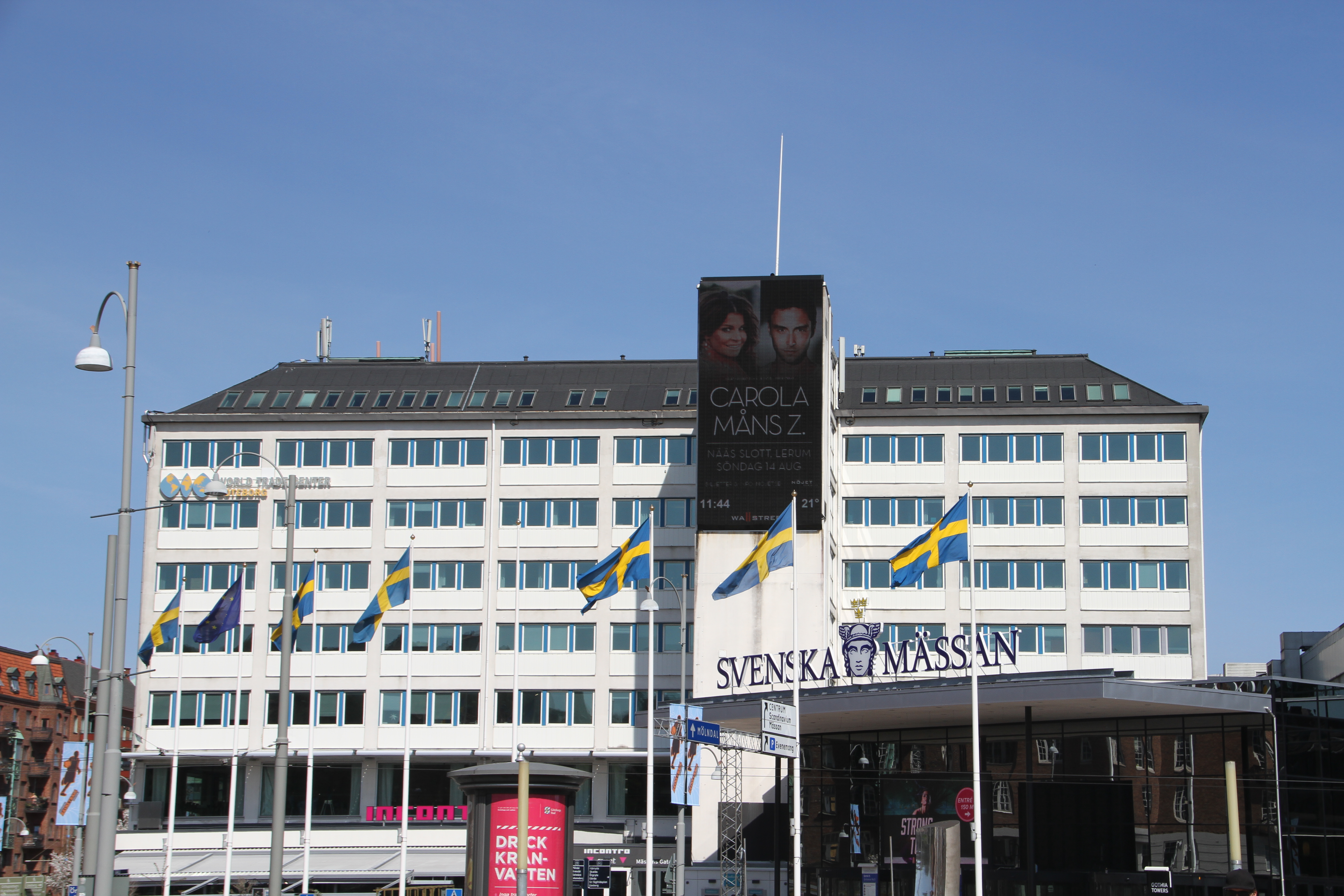
- Interactive map of Swedish Exhibition & Congress Centre
- Location: Korsvägen, Gothenburg, Sweden
- Coordinates: 57°41′51″N 11°59′19″E
- Owner: SECC Foundation

Construction
- Opened: 8 July 1918
- Renovated: 1984, 2006
- Expanded: 1939, 1957, 1971
- Architect: Nils Einar Eriksson (1939)

Website
- www.svenskamassan.se/en/

The Swedish Exhibition & Congress Centre (Swedish: Svenska Mässan) is an exhibition and convention centre in Gothenburg, Sweden and one of Scandinavia's largest assembly points, which attracts around 1.8 million visitors a year. It is one of Europe's largest, fully integrated hotel and congress facilities, owned and run by a nonprofit foundation, the Swedish Exhibition & Congress Centre Foundation.

A third tower was built in 2011–2014, making the venue one of the five largest in Europe, with a room capacity of over 1,200.

== History ==
In the early 20th century a variety of Swedish companies arranged fairs in order to promote Swedish industry. Hence emerged the idea of a congress centre, and on 8 July 1918 the official Swedish Exhibition & Congress Centre was opened.

Svenska Mässan wanted to expand further. During the 1970s, they started organizing courses and conferences, thus conference and congress facilities were built.

== Facilities ==
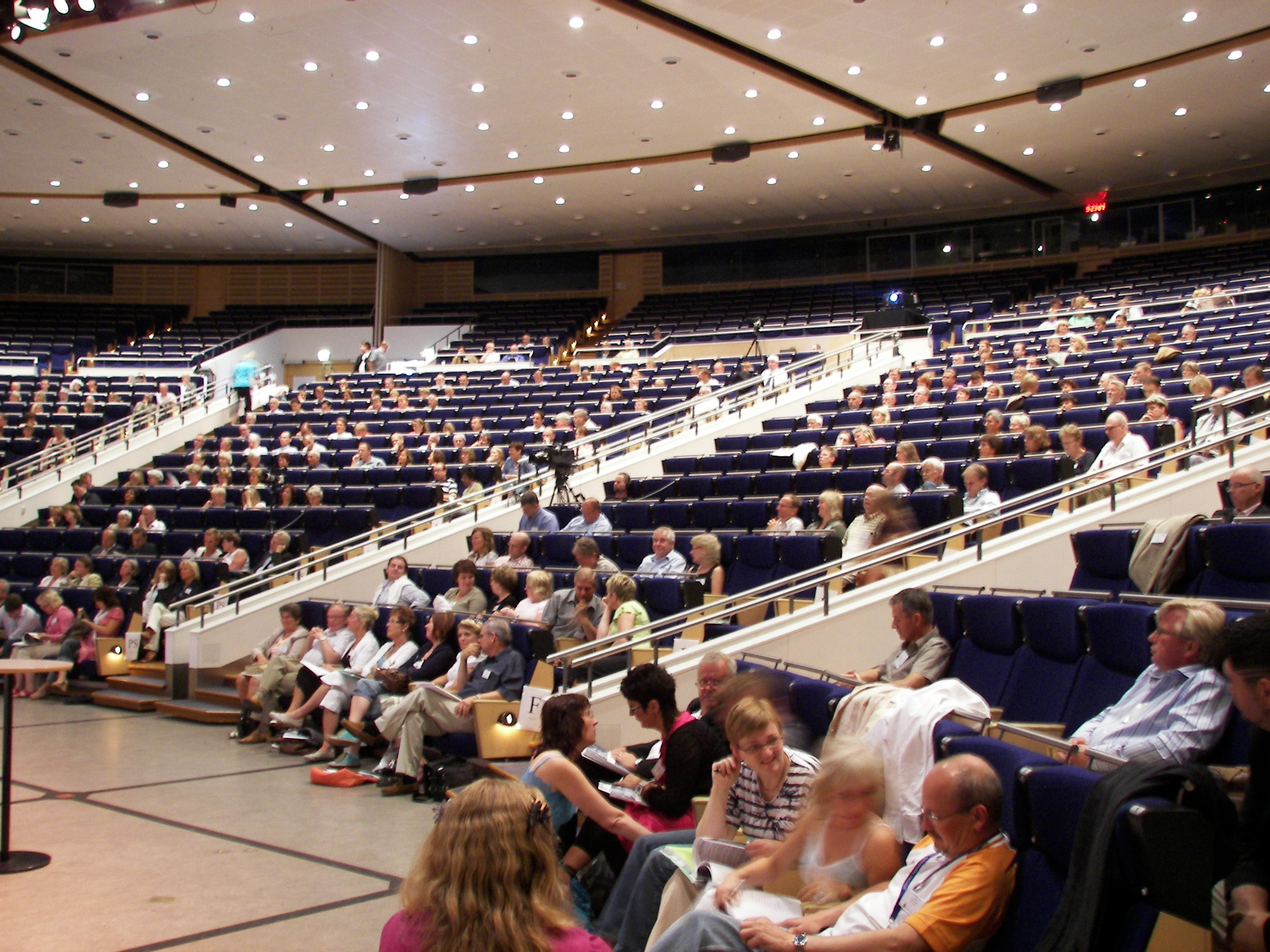
The congress hall

The centre has nine exhibition halls, 60 meeting rooms (from 2 to 8,800 guests), a congress hall for 1,500 people, eight restaurants, five bars and Scandinavia's largest hotel, Gothia Towers. The centre has an area of 41,000 m^{2} (440,000 ft^{2}) for exhibitions and congresses, and each year about 30 exhibitions are held with 8,000 exhibitors. Festivities and banquets are held at the venue with up to 8,000 guests.

== Location ==
The location of the Congress Centre was decided by different trade commissions and industry corporations when Svenska Mässan was established. The location is efficient since it is in the middle of Scandinavia, equidistant to the three capitals of Sweden, Denmark and Norway – Stockholm, Copenhagen and Oslo. The central location also places the venue within walking distance of hotels, restaurants, pubs, shopping malls and theatres.

== Events ==
The arena was one of the four potential candidate venues to host the Eurovision Song Contest 2013. In the end, the Malmö Arena was chosen to host the contest.
