= West Link =

Railway tunnel in Gothenburg, Sweden

Västlänken
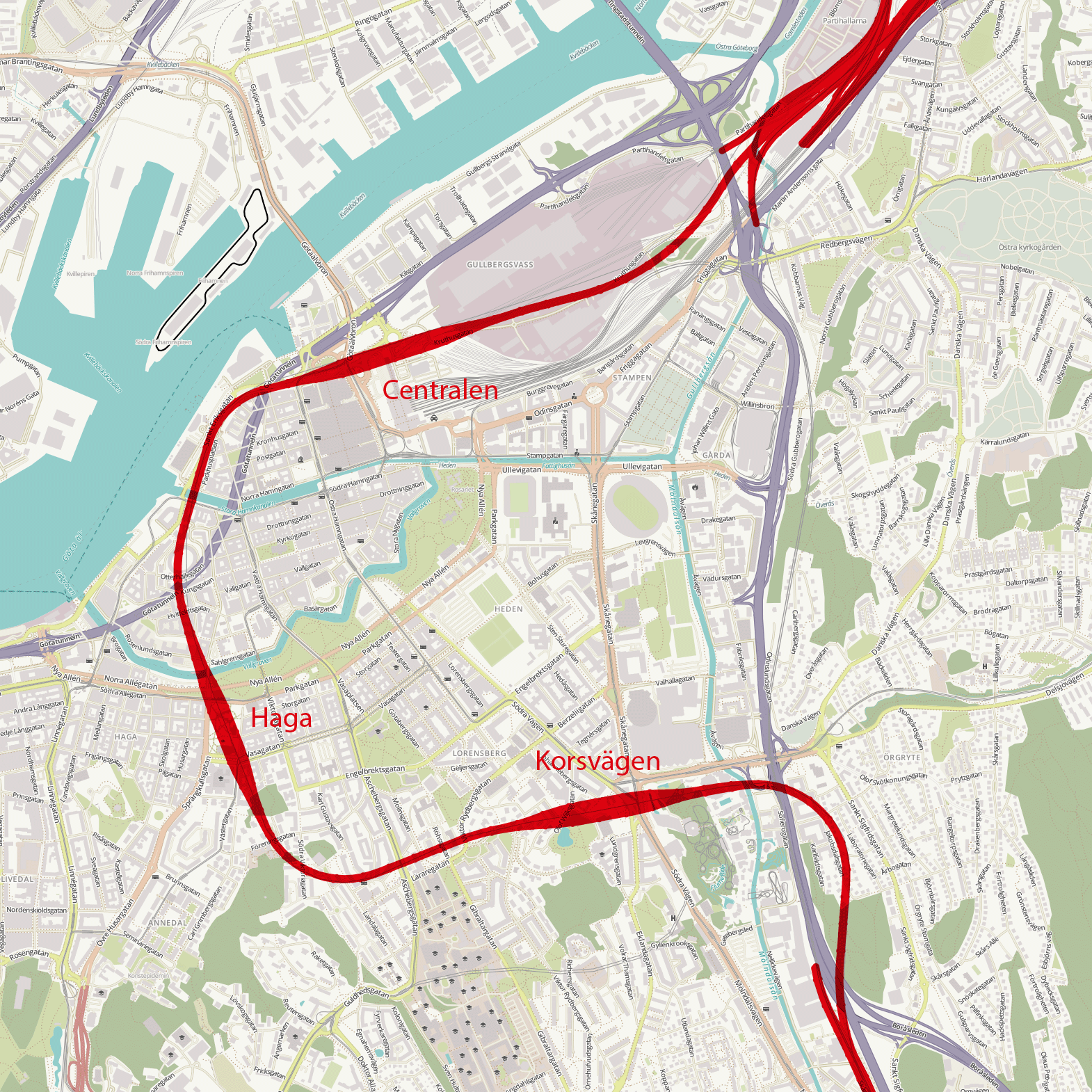

Overview
- Line: Västkustbanan
- Location: Gothenburg, Sweden
- Status: Under construction
- System: Gothenburg commuter rail
- Start: Olskroken east of Göteborg C
- End: Almedal south of Liseberg
- No. of stations: 3

Operation
- Opens: Centralen station: Late 2026; Full: 2030
- Owner: Trafikverket
- Character: Passenger trains

Technical
- Line length: 290 km
- Track length: 8 km
- No. of tracks: Double
- Track gauge: 1,435 mm (4 ft 8 1/2 in)
- Electrified: 15 kV 16.7 Hz AC

The West Link (Swedish: Västlänken) is a railway project under construction in Gothenburg, Sweden. It consists of 8 kilometres (5 mi) of railway, including 6 kilometres (4 mi) of tunnel, including three new underground stations: Centralen, Haga and Korsvägen. The purpose of the project is to increase capacity and reduce travel times for commuter and regional trains.

The Centralen section of the West Link is set to open in December 2026, while the rest of the tunnel is planned to be ready for traffic by December 2030.

== Background ==
The West Link project was initiated to address capacity issues at Gothenburg Central Station, which operates as a terminus with no room for additional trains during peak hours. This limitation has obstructed efforts to expand train services, as well as to construct a new railway to Borås, the second-largest city in the region, which is currently linked to Gothenburg primarily by dense bus services.

Of the 1.02 million people (2018) who live in Greater Gothenburg (1.7 million in Västra Götaland County), 450,000 people live outside the Gothenburg municipality. Approximately 175,000 people in the region commute to or from Gothenburg Municipality daily.

The project forms part of the West Swedish Financing Package (Västsvenska Paketet) and is expected to cost between 24.1 and 27.1 billion SEK (2009 price levels). Construction involves rock blasting through bedrock and excavation in clay, with ongoing installation of tracks, overhead power systems, signalling, and telecommunications infrastructure. Initially planned to open fully by 2026, the West Link is now expected to be completed by December 2030.

Similar tunnels in Sweden's other main cities include the City Tunnel, completed in Malmö in 2010, and the City Line, completed in Stockholm in 2017.

== History ==
=== Planning process ===
As early as the 1950s there were plans for a tunnel under the inner city for railbound vehicles, then for trams. The plans were abandoned because of the cost, due to the high water table and ground conditions, which were unsuitable for tunnelling. The city has to finance tramways, while the government finances railways.

The planning process has taken a long time, being included in preliminary city plans in the mid 90s under the project name "Centrumtunneln". A feasibility study was conducted in 2001–2002 by Banverket in cooperation with Västra Götalandsregionen, Västtrafik, Göteborgsregionen, and the city of Gothenburg. Similar rail tunnel projects have already been implemented in Malmö and in Stockholm.

Västlänken is not part of the Trafikverket Future plan (swe: Framtidsplan) 2004–2015, nor the alternative plan. Construction could start earlier since the Västra Götaland Regional Council is willing to invest money in the project.

=== Routes ===
Banverket investigated three routes for Västlänken, including new stations along the routes in the city centre. The route alternatives were named after the proposed new stations: Haga–Korsvägen, Haga–Chalmers, and Korsvägen. In addition to these underground alternatives, an expansion of the current rail network to the south, with a larger terminus station, was also investigated, named Förstärkningsalternativet (English: the reinforcement alternative).

On 19 December 2007, Banverket chose the Haga-Korsvägen alternative as it best fulfilled the goals for the expansion. A majority of other governmental bodies to which the proposed routes were referred for consideration also agreed on that opinion.

== Construction ==
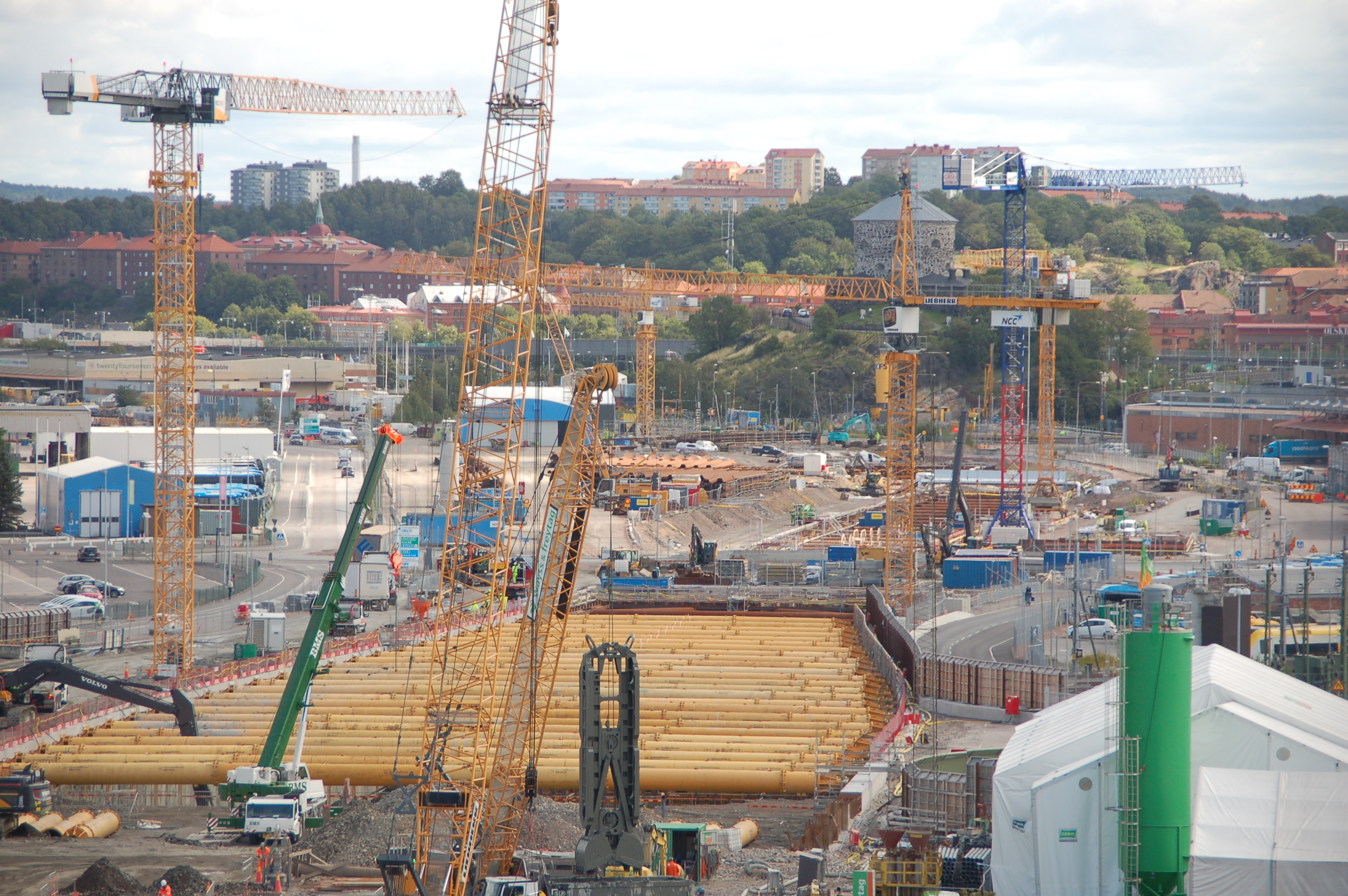
West Link under construction, summer of 2020

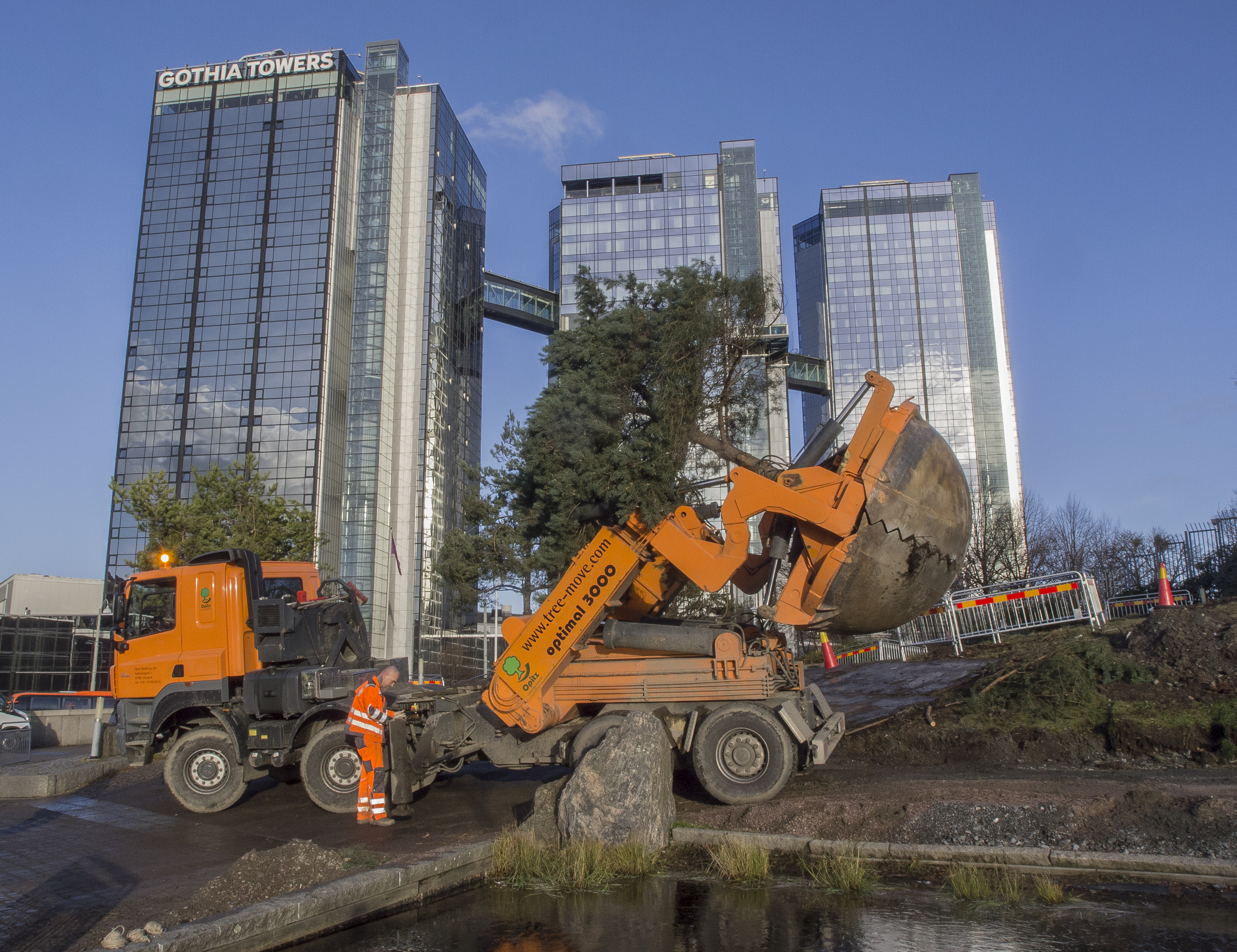
Movement of trees in preparation for construction, November 2017

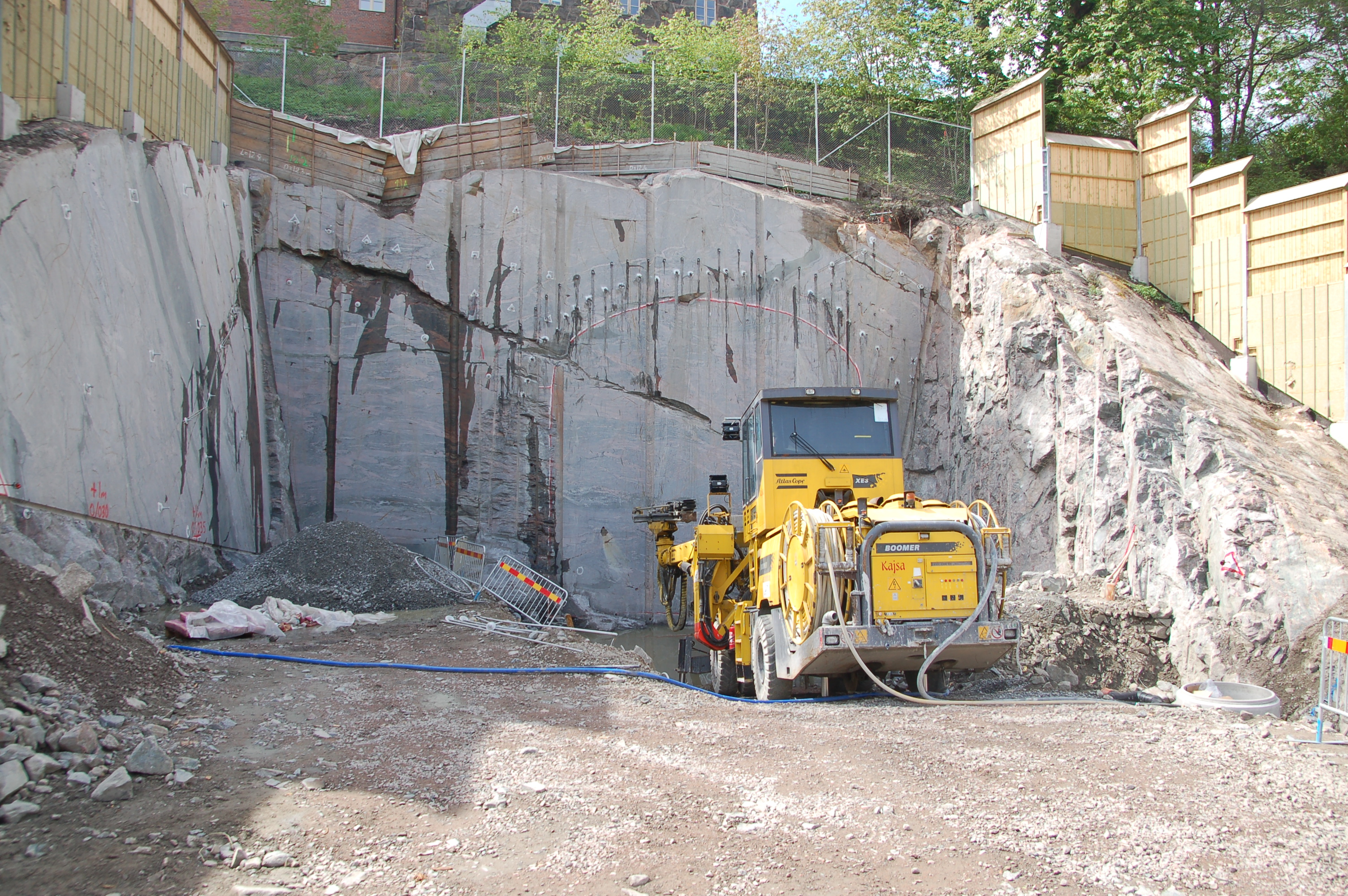
Preparations in May 2019 for blasting of a work tunnel next to the Chalmers Tunnel at Södra Vägen.

The official construction start ceremony took place on 30 May 2018.

In September 2023, the estimated completion date was delayed to around 2030, with construction of the Haga section stalled due to slow progress and the contract re-let. There have been objections by the operator of the Paddan tour boats to the proposal to shut the canal for three years in order to facilitate the work.

Progress in 2024 included the completion of concrete casting at Centralen, with installation work beginning. The Kvarnberget tunnel was finished, and surface areas were handed back over to Gothenburg Municipality. In Haga, construction resumed after delays, with three contracts awarded and work restarting in key areas. At Korsvägen, the tunnel's excavation was completed, and concrete work advanced on the station and connecting tunnels.

== Financing ==
West Link is a part of the West Sweden Package (Swedish: Västsvenska paketet) an infrastructure funding initiative in western Sweden. Established in 2010, other major projects included in the package are the Marieholm road tunnel, the Hisingen Bridge, and the burying of the E45 motorway in central Gothenburg.

As of 2023, the total construction cost for the project was estimated at SEK 36.5 billion (approx. €1.8 billion). Almost half of the funding for the West Sweden Package comes from the Swedish state, which contributes approximately 47% of the total cost, while Gothenburg Municipality provides around 3.4%. Västra Götaland Region and Region Halland jointly contribute about 2.7%, and an additional 2.1% is financed through the realisation of land values. The Gothenburg congestion tax accounts for approximately 38.4% of the total funding.

Financing from congestion tax, introduced in January 2013, has been a source of controversy. A non-binding referendum was held in Gothenburg Municipality in September 2014, in which 57% of respondents voted to abolish the tax. However, it remains in place as part of the financing strategy for the West Sweden Package.

In September of 2025, Gothenburg Municipality cancelled the contract with the main contractor due to cost increases.

== Centralstaden ==
As part of the West Link project, Jernhusen, Sweden's state-owned railway real estate company, is developing the surrounding railway land into Centralstaden, an urban area surrounding the new Centralen station.

The development includes approximately 140,000 square metres (1,500,000 sq ft) of leasable space, primarily for offices, but with potential for residential, retail, and cultural uses. Notable buildings in the area include Park Central, a 30,000-square-metre (320,000 sq ft) office complex, and Gothenburg Grand Central, a 15,000-square-metre (160,000 sq ft) building that will house the main entrance to Centralen station, along with 1,400 square metres (15,000 sq ft) of retail space and 8,000 square metres (86,000 sq ft) of office space.

The Centralstaden plan features six high-rise buildings, with the tallest reaching 130 metres (430 ft). The area is part of Gothenburg Municipality's Vision Älvstaden urban development.

== Art ==
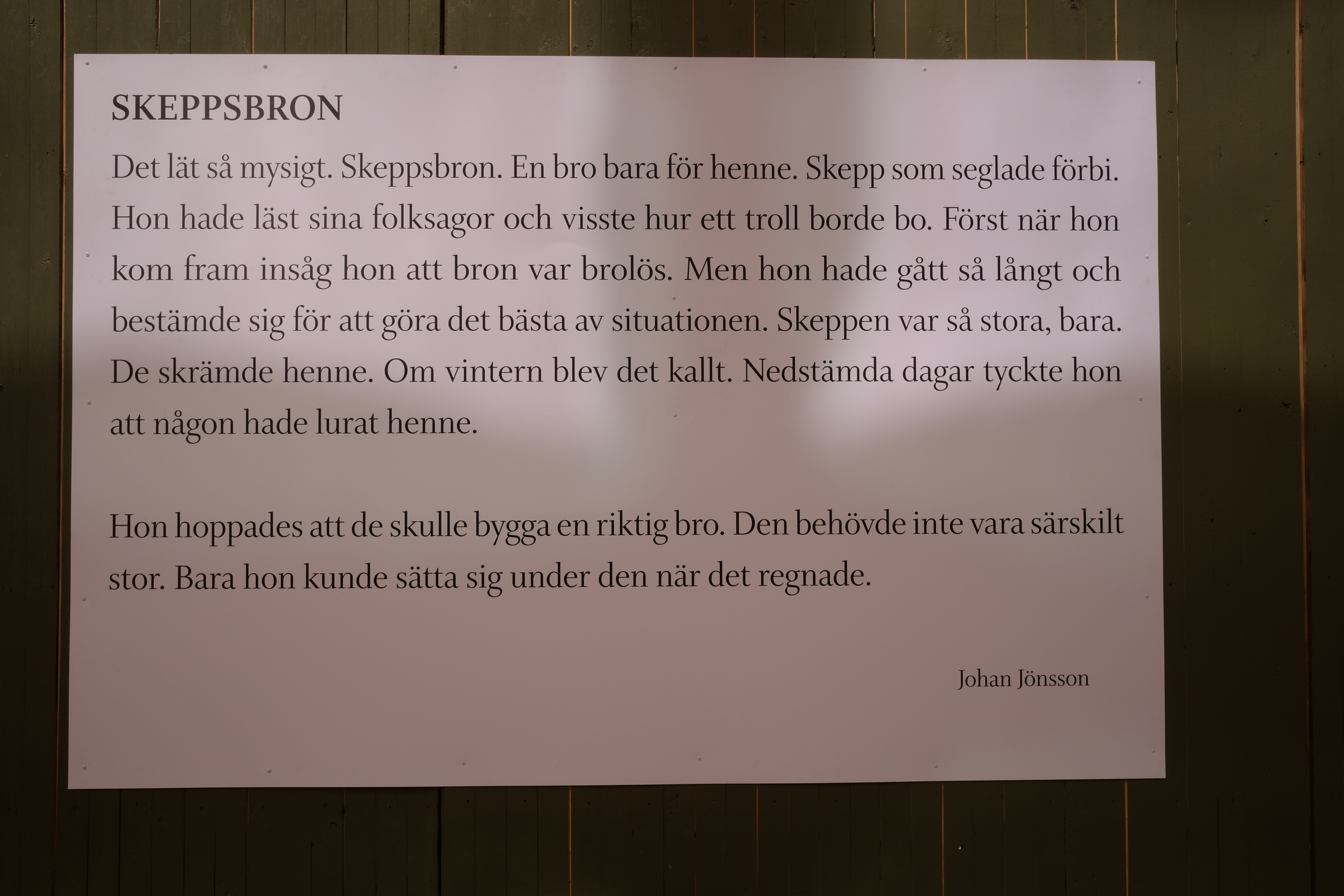
Art on building fence

Trafikverket (the Swedish Department of Transportation) are hosting a public art project from 2018 through 2026 to make the building fences less of a negative intrusion in the city. There are 8 kilometres (5 mi) of building fences during the construction period, 2.8–4 metres (9–13 ft) high. Trafikverket publicly asked artists to submit ideas and presentations of artworks that could be part of the project. The first 2 artworks were created in 2018. The big start was in 2019. There are or will be artworks in Centralen, Kanaltorget, Sankt Eriksgatan, Västa Sjöfarten, Packhusplatsen, Skeppsbron, Södra Hamngatan, Rosenlund, Haga, Pustervik, Linnéplatsen, och Korsvägen. The project is called Planksidan.

== See also ==
- City Tunnel, Malmö
- Citybanan, Stockholm
- Gothenburg quadricentennial jubilee
