= Gothia Towers =

Hotel in Gothenburg, Sweden

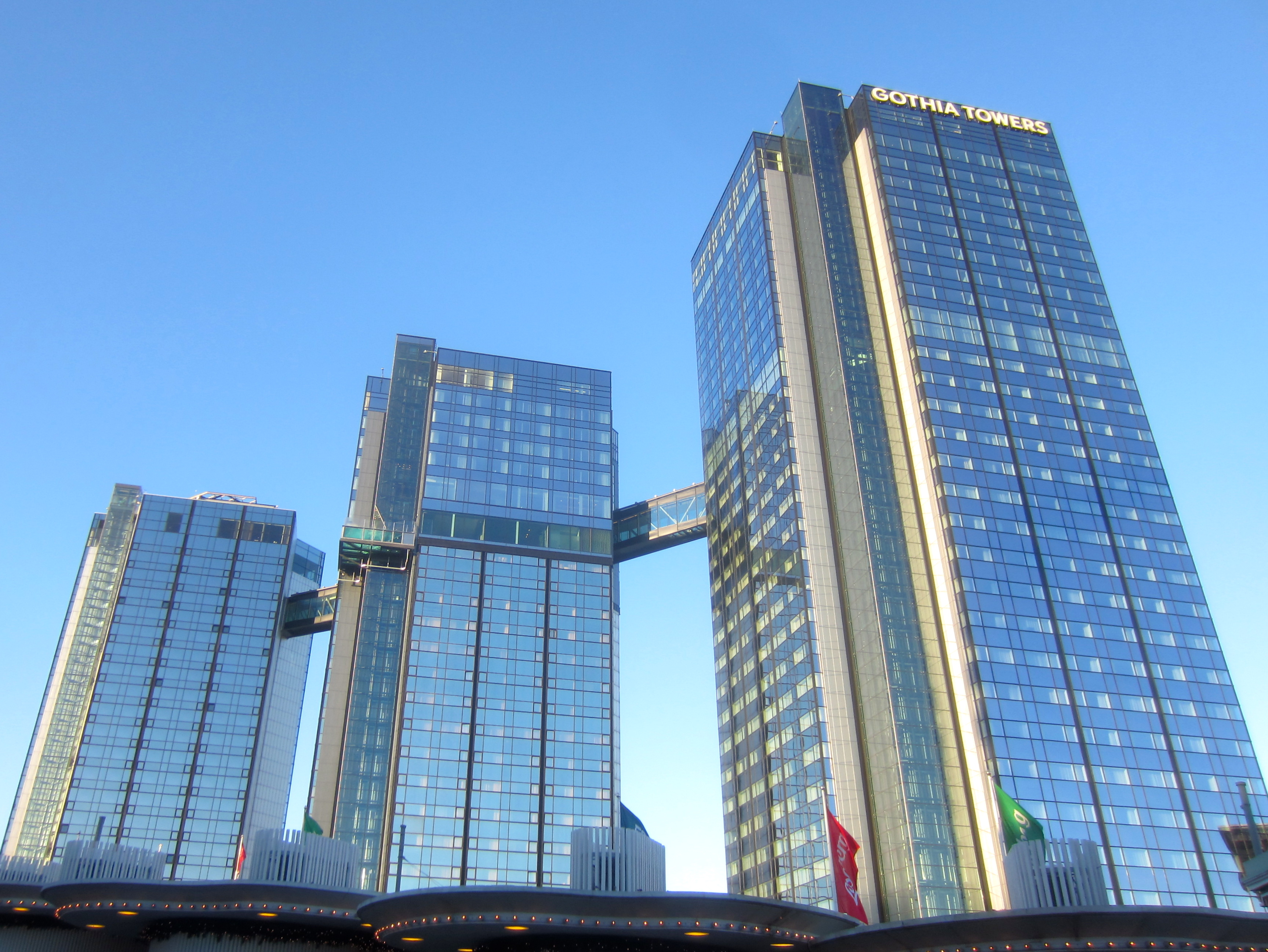
- Interactive map of the Gothia Towers area

General information
- Location: Gothenburg, Sweden
- Coordinates: 57°41′50″N 11°59′19″E
- Opening: 1984, 2001, 2014

Technical details
- Floor count: 29 (Tower 3); 25 (Tower 2); 24 (Tower 1)

Design and construction
- Architect: White Arkitekter AB

Other information
- Number of rooms: 1,200
- Number of restaurants: 5

The Gothia Towers, in Gothenburg, Sweden, is the largest hotel in the Nordic countries. Part of the Swedish Exhibition and Congress Centre, it has 1,200 rooms and eleven suites and offers a variety of restaurants and bars.

== Construction ==
The first tower was built in 1984, and the second in 2001. The third tower was built between 2011 and 2014. The third tower was the tallest building (100 m (330 ft)) in Gothenburg until 2023, it is now the third tallest of the city and the fourteenth tallest building in Sweden.

== Facilities ==
In 2014, the Upper House was inaugurated in the second tower, a five-star hotel within the hotel. The Upper House has an awarded restaurant and an exclusive 3-floor spa with an outdoor glass bottom pool on the 19th floor. Also inaugurated in 2014, was the show arena the Theatre.

=== Heaven 23 ===
Heaven 23 is a bar and restaurant located on the 23rd floor. It was opened in connection with the second tower. The restaurant and bar have a total of 178 restaurant and bar seats.

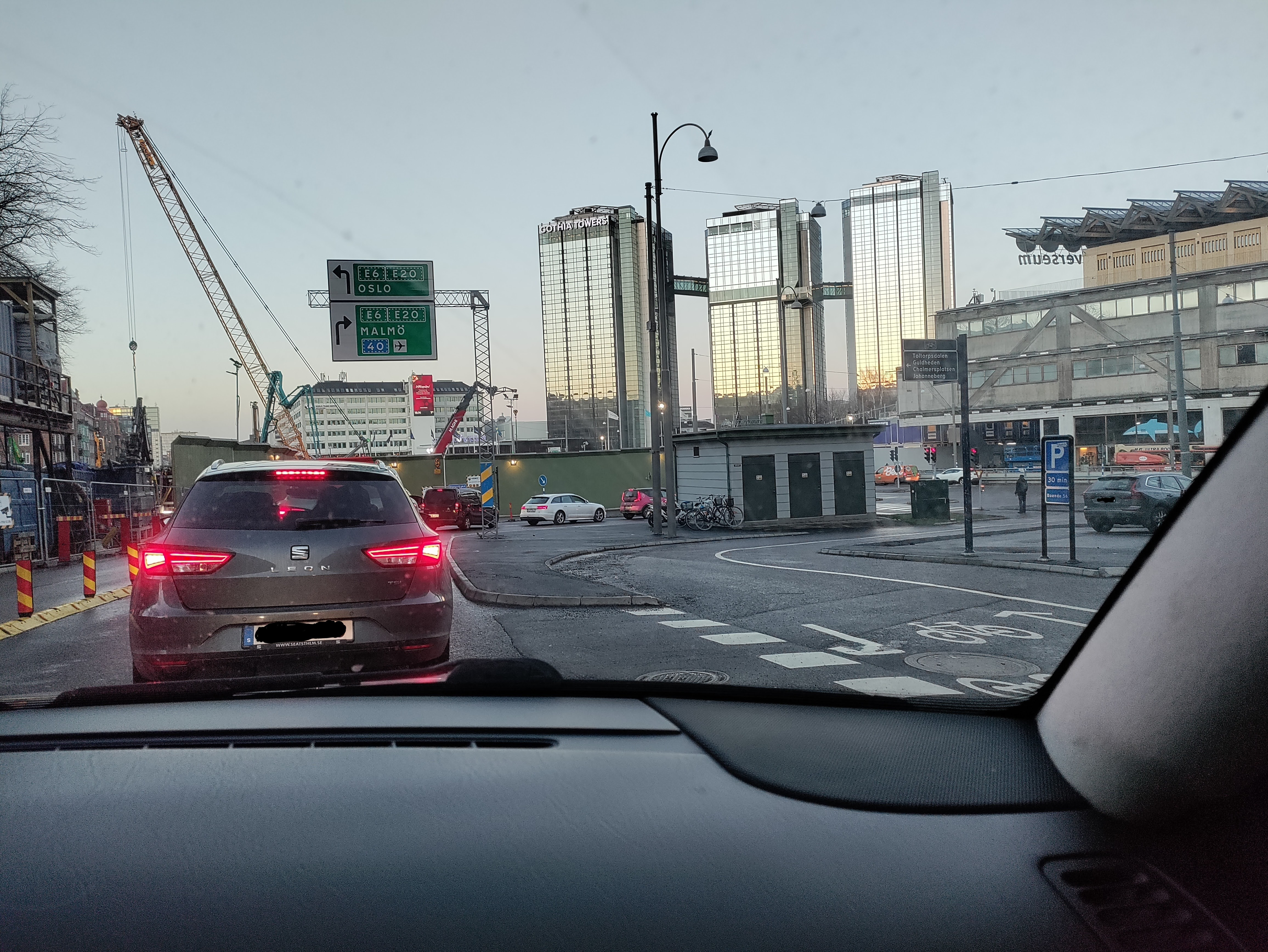
The towers seen from "Eklandagatan"
