= Museum of World Culture =

Museum in Gothenburg, Sweden

The Museum of World Culture

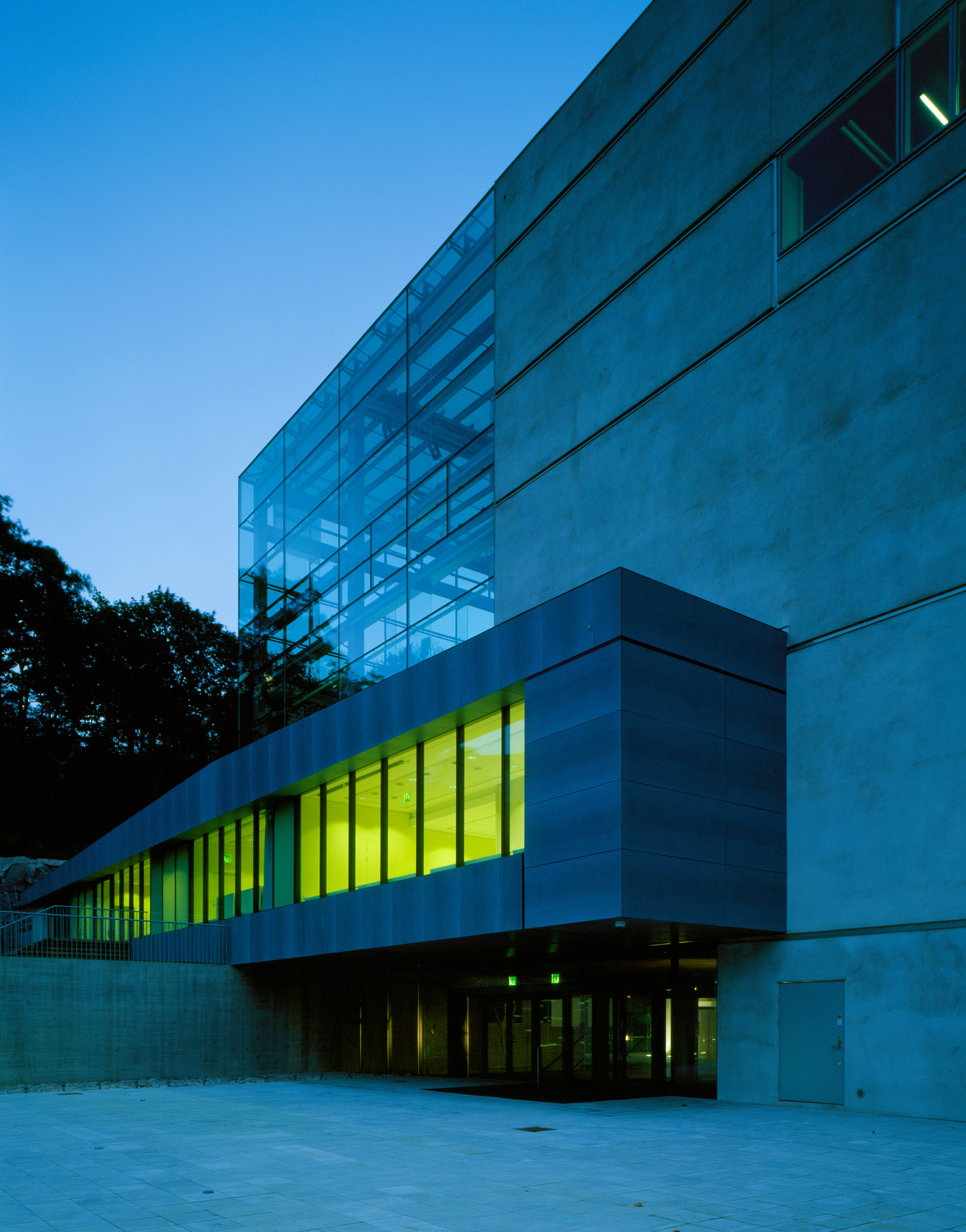
- Entrance to the museum
- Interactive fullscreen map
- Established: 2004
- Location: Södra vägen, Gothenburg, Sweden
- Coordinates: 57°41′41″N 11°59′21″E
- Visitors: 227 248 (2006)
- Director: Margareta Alin
- Website: varldskulturmuseet.se

The National Museum of World Culture opened in Gothenburg, Sweden, in 2004. It is a part of the public authority Swedish National Museums of World Cultures and builds on the collections of the former Göteborgs Etnografiska Museum that closed down in the year 2000. Its aim is to interpret the subject of world culture in an interdisciplinary way. The museum is situated next to the Universeum science centre and the amusement park Liseberg, and close to Korsvägen. "The museum interprets the concept of world culture in a dynamic and open-ended manner. On the one hand, various cultures are incorporating impulses from each other and becoming more alike. On the other hand, local, national, ethnic and gender differences are shaping much of that process. World culture is not only about communication, reciprocity, and interdependence, but the specificity, concretion and uniqueness of each and every individual." (From the background info on the museums homepage.)

The opening exhibitions of the museum were:

- No Name Fever: AIDS in the age of globalization
- Horizons: Voices from a global Africa
- Sister of Dreams: People and myths of the Orinoco
- Fred Wilson: Site unseen - Dwellings of the Demons
- 390 m2 Spirituality

== Architecture ==
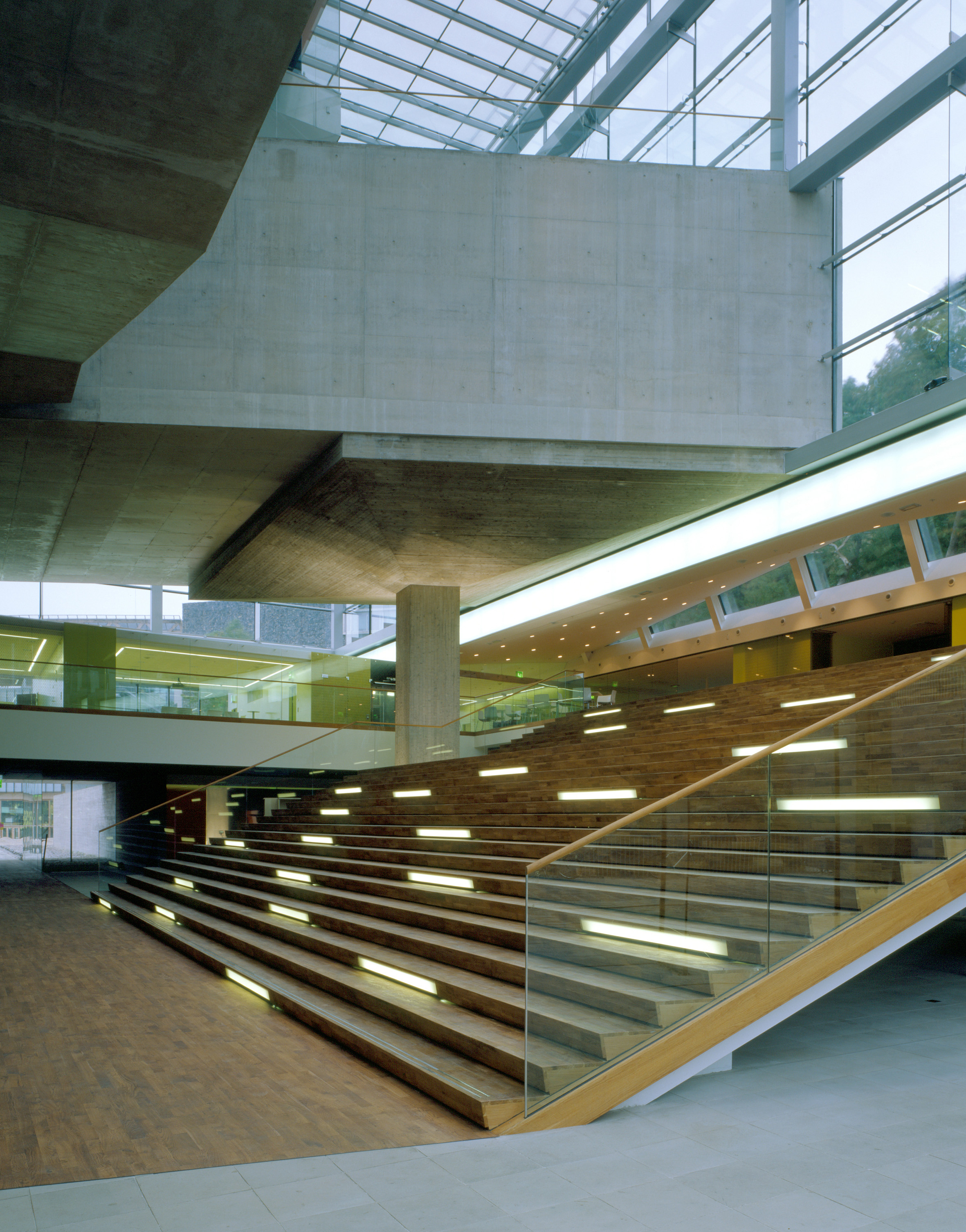
The grand stairs in the atrium (Fotograf: Hélène Binet)

The cement and glass building, located on a slope leading up to the Liseberg amusement park, is compact and modernistic. Its four-storey glass atrium looks out on mountains and woods.

The exhibition halls are in the closed part of the building, facing Södra vägen road. The upper storeys hang freely 5 m (16 ft) over a footpath. A 43 m (141 ft) long section of a display window provides passers-by with a view straight into the largest exhibition hall.

The architects behind the museum, who were chosen after an international competition, were the French-Cuban-English couple Cécile Brisac and Edgar Gonzalez of Brisac Gonzalez Architects.

In December 2020, the Arkitekturupproret movement, a peoples movement against modernist architecture, voted the building the ugliest building in Gothenburg and the 12th ugliest building in Sweden.

== Controversies ==
In February 2005 the museum decided to remove the painting "Scène d'Amour" by Louzla Darabi. The painting was part of a temporary exhibition about HIV/AIDS, and depicted a man and a woman having sexual intercourse. The artist and the curator had received numerous death threats from Muslims saddened and frustrated over the Koran quotations which were featured in a corner of the painting. Some threats were telling the artist to "learn from the Netherlands", referring to the murder of van Gogh and threats against Hirsi Ali.
