= Kasper Salin Prize =

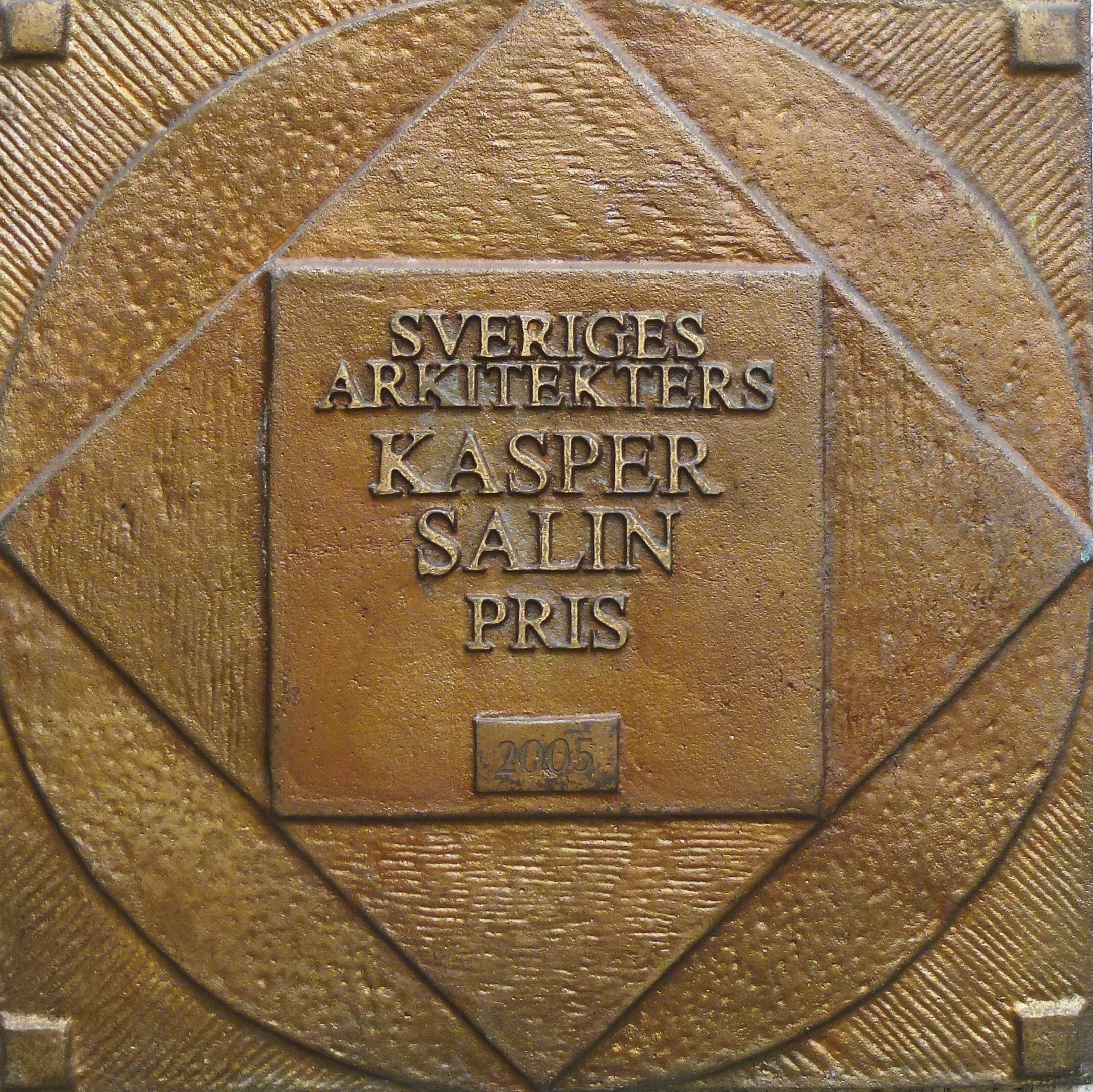
- Bronze plaque of the 2005 winner
- Awarded for: Swedish building or group of buildings "of high architectural quality"
- Country: Sweden
- Presented by: Architects Sweden (Sveriges Arkitekter)
- First award: 1962; 64 years ago
- Final award: 2020
- Currently held by: The House of Culture, Stockholm
- Website: www.arkitekt.se/arkitekturpriser/kasper-salin-priset/

The Kasper Salin Prize (Swedish: Kasper Salin-priset) is a prize awarded annually by Architects Sweden (Sveriges Arkitekter) to a Swedish building or building project "of high architectural quality". It is considered the most prestigious architectural prize in the country and has been awarded since 1962. The award is distributed to the building itself and consists of a bronze relief, designed by Swedish architect Bengt Lindroos (1918–2010), which is attached to the building. The prize was funded on the basis of a donation from Kasper Salin (1856–1919) who served as the city architect of Stockholm from 1898 until 1915.

A satirical version of the award, Kasper Kalkon-priset, was created by Architectural Uprising.

== Winners ==
Several years (1965, 1973, 1990, 2004) have seen two winners, and no prize was awarded in 1976.

- Markuskyrkan, Stockholm (1962)
- PUB annex, Stockholm (1963)
- City hall, Kiruna (1964)
- Malmö University Faculty of Education, Malmö (1965)
- Crematorium, Gävle (1965)
- Åhléns, Stockholm (1966)
- Medborgarhuset, Örebro (1967)
- Vildanden, Lund (1968)
- Televerket's administrative buildings, Stockholm (1969)
- Kvarteret Barberaren, Sandviken (1970)
- Pharmacia building, Uppsala (1971)
- Temporary house of parliament, Stockholm (1972)
- Tekniska högskolan metro station, Stockholm (1973)
- Stadion metro station, Stockholm (1973)
- Malmö Konsthall, Malmö (1974)
- Sport- och simhall, Sollentuna (1975)
- No prize awarded in 1976
- Rudolf Steinerseminariet, Järna (1977)
- Silvertältet, Solna (1978)
- Solbacka, Norrtälje (1979)
- Stockholm University Allhuset, Stockholm (1980)
- Museum of Ethnography, Sweden, Stockholm (1981)
- Arrivals terminal, Stockholm Arlanda Airport, Sigtuna (1982)
- Kvarteret Varmfronten, Stockholm (1983)
- Gävle Teater, Gävle (1984)
- Spårvagnshallarna, Gothenburg (1985)
- Kvarteret Drottningen, Stockholm (1986)
- Leksands kulturhus, Leksand (1987)
- Öijareds Executive Country Club, Floda (1988)
- Chapel crematorium, Linköping (1989)
- Klarahuset, Stockholm (1990)
- Vasa Museum, Stockholm (1990)
- Jönköping County Museum (1991)
- Kvarteret Nielsen, Borås (1992)
- Astra Hässle research facility, Mölndal (1993)
- Tekniska verken, Linköping (1994)
- Gothenburg School of Business, Economics and Law, Gothenburg (1995)
- Nils Ericson Terminal, Gothenburg (1996)
- Malmö City Library, Malmö (1997)
- Museum of Architecture, Stockholm (1998)
- Millesgården, Stockholm (1999)
- Kvarteret Slottet, Helsingborg (2000)
- Chalmers Students' Union building, Gothenburg (2001)
- Pier F, Stockholm Arlanda Airport, Sigtuna (2002)
- Kvarteret Katsan, White, Stockholm (2003)
- Museum of World Culture, Gothenburg (2004)
- Södertörn University Library, Huddinge (2004)
- Sjöstadsparterren, Stockholm (2005)
- Aranäsgymnasiet, Kungsbacka (2006)
- House of Sweden, Washington D.C., United States (2007)
- Kalmar Art Museum, Kalmar (2008)
- Urbana Villor, Malmö (2009)
- Ryaverket, Gothenburg (2010)
- Triangeln station, Malmö (2011)
- Lund Cathedral Forum, Lund (2012)
- New crematorium at Skogskyrkogården, Stockholm (2013)
- Kulturväven, Umeå (2014)
- KTH School of Architecture, Stockholm (2015)
- HSB Studio 1, Gothenburg (2016)
- Museum of Sketches for Public Art, Lund (2017)
- Ateljébostad, Hamra (2018)
- Bostadsrättsföreningen Viva, Gothenburg (2019)
- House of Culture (Kulturhuset), Stockholm (2020)
- Filborna water tower, Helsingborg (2021)
- Merkurhuset, Gothenburg (2022)
- Wisdome Stockholm (expansion to the Swedish National Museum of Science and Technology), Stockholm (2023)
