= Ryaverket =

Sewage treatment plant in Gothenburg, Sweden

Coordinates: 57.6970°N 11.8909°E

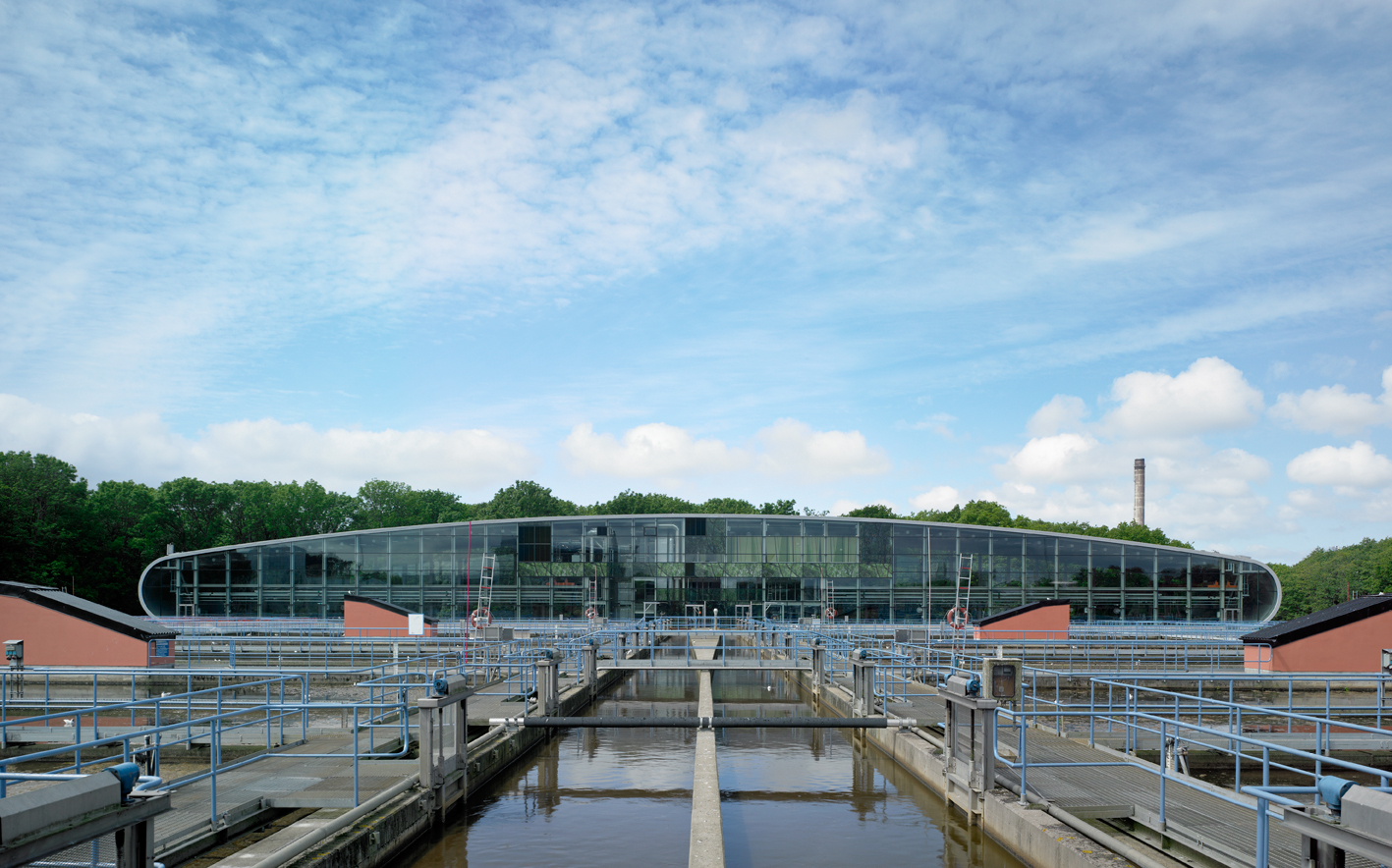
Filter treatment plant at Ryaverket, by KUB architects.

Ryaverket is a regional sewage treatment plant in Gothenburg, Sweden. The plant is located in southern Hisingen and treats wastewater from 797,485 people in the Gothenburg region (2020).

The facility is owned by Gryaab, a municipal company owned by the municipalities whose wastewater is treated at Ryaverket. The owner municipalities are Gothenburg, Ale, Härryda, Mölndal, Kungälv, Partille, Bollebygd and Lerum.

Ryaverket is the home of the world's longest mural, of 696 square meters, by Pontus Andersson. The architecture firm KUB was given the Kasper Salin Prize by Architects Sweden in 2010 for designing the plant.

== See also ==
- Rya skog
