= Rya skog =

Nature reserve in Gothenburg, Sweden

Coordinates: 57°41′43.06″N 11°53′10.55″E

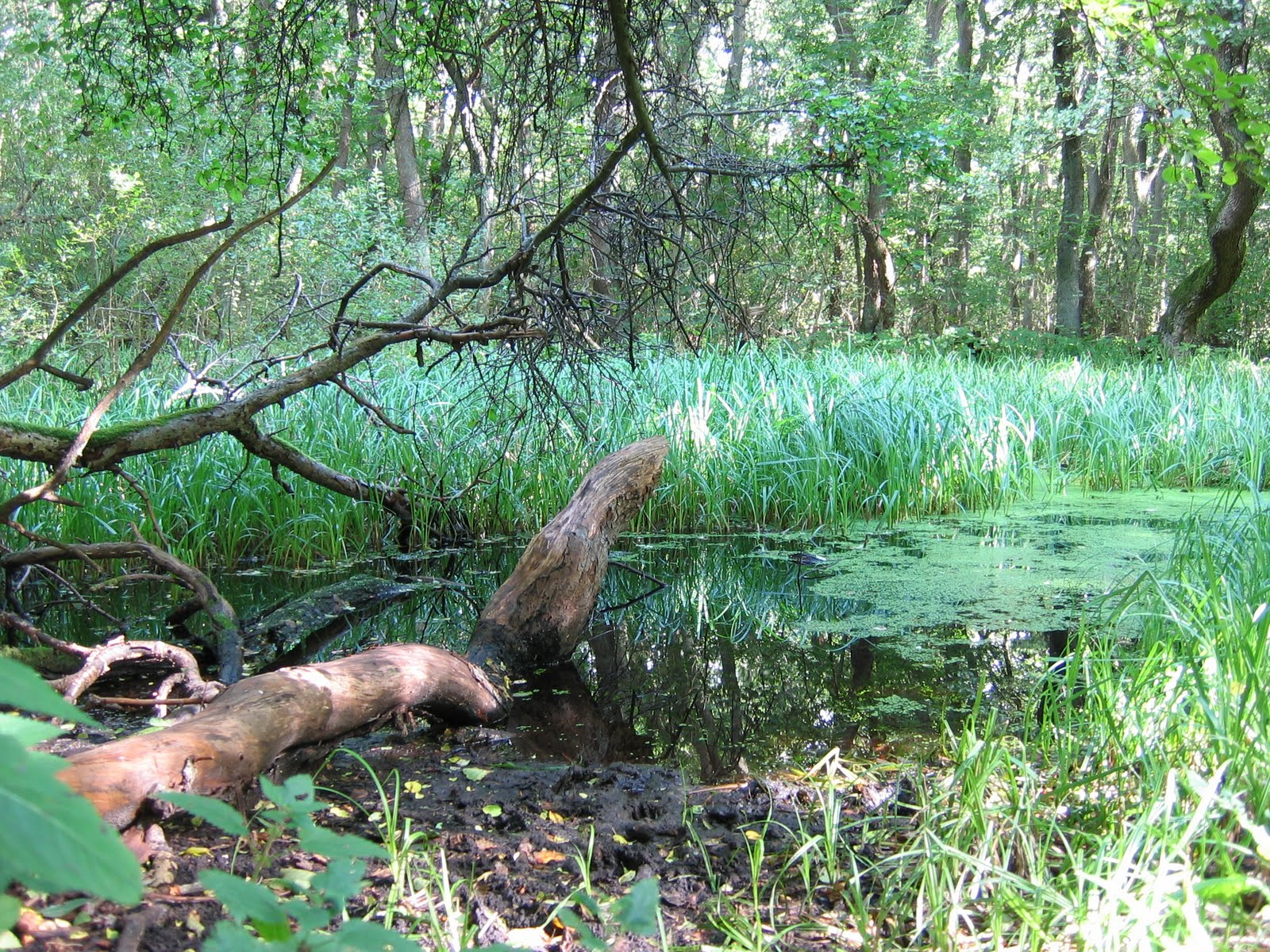

The Rya Forest (Swedish: Rya skog) is a nature reserve in Gothenburg, Sweden. It is located on the Hisingen island, on the northern bank of the Göta River. It has an area of 17 hectares. Established in 1928, it is the oldest nature reserve in Västra Götaland County.

The reserve lies in the middle of a busy industrial area, close to oil refineries and the Ryaverket sewage treatment plan. In spite of that, it displays a diverse flora and fauna, typical for a marsh forest, alder being the most common tree. The age of the trees reaches 200 years, while some of the oaks are a few centuries old. Many species of lichens, mosses and fungi have been found. In the spring, the meadows in the reserve are covered with blooming wood anemones.

The forest houses rare insects, butterflies and beetles. With its many birds, such as the hawfinch, the tawny owl, and the Eurasian woodcock, it has also attracted the interest of ornithologists.
