= White (architecture firm) =

Swedish architectural firm

White Arkitekter
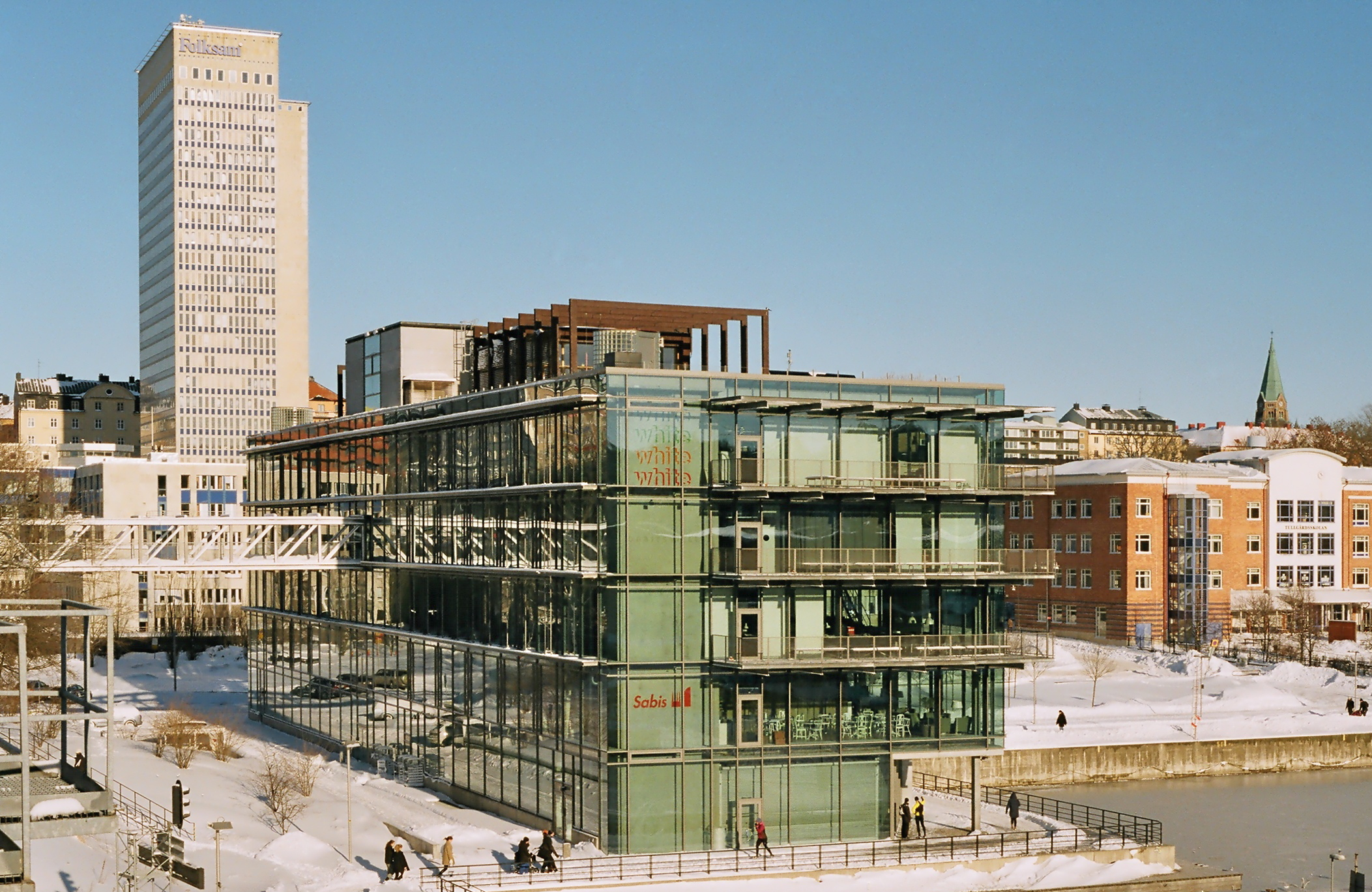
- White Arkitekter's Stockholm office which was awarded the Kasper Salin Prize in 2003

Practice information
- Founded: 1951
- Location: Gothenburg, Sweden

White Arkitekter is an architectural firm founded in Gothenburg, Sweden. It is the biggest firm in Scandinavia, with more than 500 employees. The company has 14 offices in Sweden, Great Britain, Germany and Norway.

== Background ==
The firm was founded in Gothenburg in 1951 by architects Sidney White (1917–1982) and P. A. Ekholm, and has since established offices in Stockholm, Malmö, Halmstad, Linköping, Örebro, Uppsala, Umeå, Västerås, London, and Stuttgart. White Arkitekter has a shared ownership model between their employees, with more than 400 shareholders, of which ~100 are partners.

== Notable projects ==
- Skellefteå Culture Centre - Timber high rise which will house a new Culture centre and a hotel and northern Sweden in 2021.
- Relocation of the city centre of Kiruna (2012-2040) - one of the biggest urban transformations of our time. The entire city will be moved approximately 3 km (2 miles) east.
- Kastrup Sea Bath, Denmark (2009) - a 328 foot long pier, redeveloping an industrial, rocky shoreline on the Øresund Strait.
- Väven, Sweden (2014) - Kasper Salin Prize-winning Cultural centre in Umeå designed in collaboration with Norwegian practice Snøhetta.
- Umeå East Station, Sweden (2010) Railway station in Umeå built in connection to Bothnia Line (Botniabanan) in Northern Sweden.
- New Karolinska Solna University hospital – an ultramodern hospital facility which will open for business in 2018.

== Awards ==
- RIBA Regional Awards East 2013 - Southend Pier Cultural Centre, UK
- Kasper Salin Prize 2014 - Väven Cultural Centre, Sweden
Project gallery

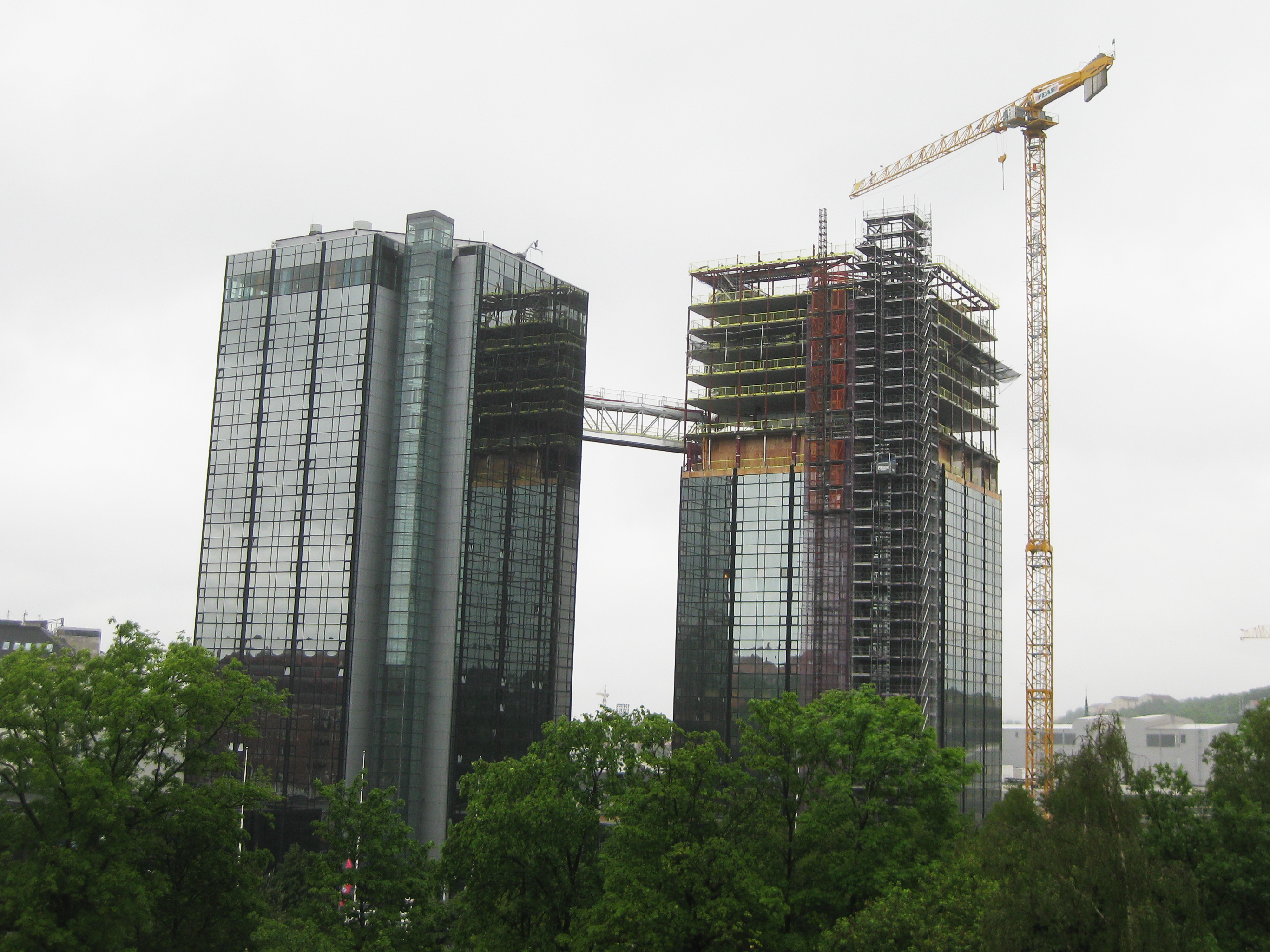
Gothia Towers, 1984

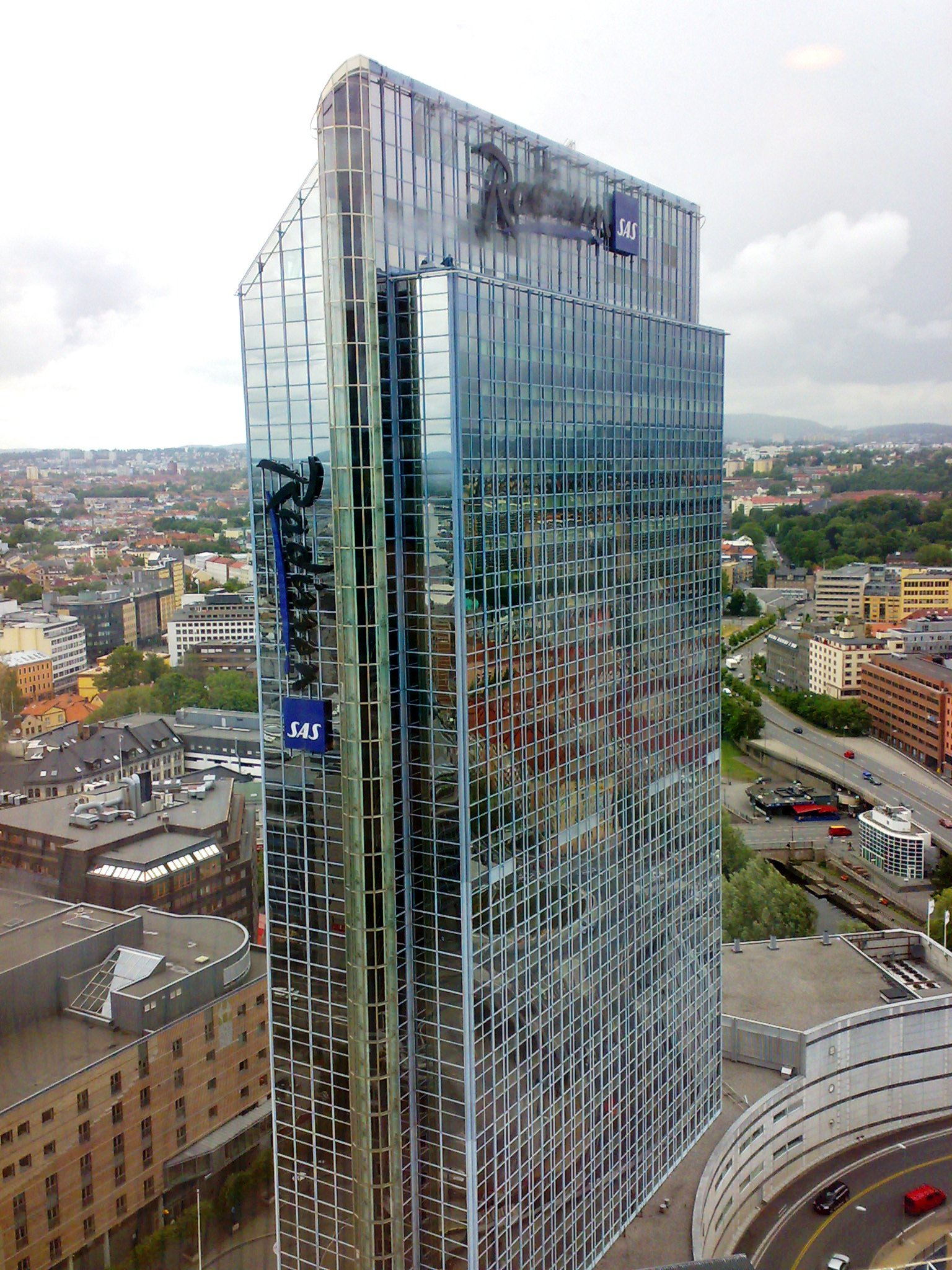
Oslo Plaza, 1989

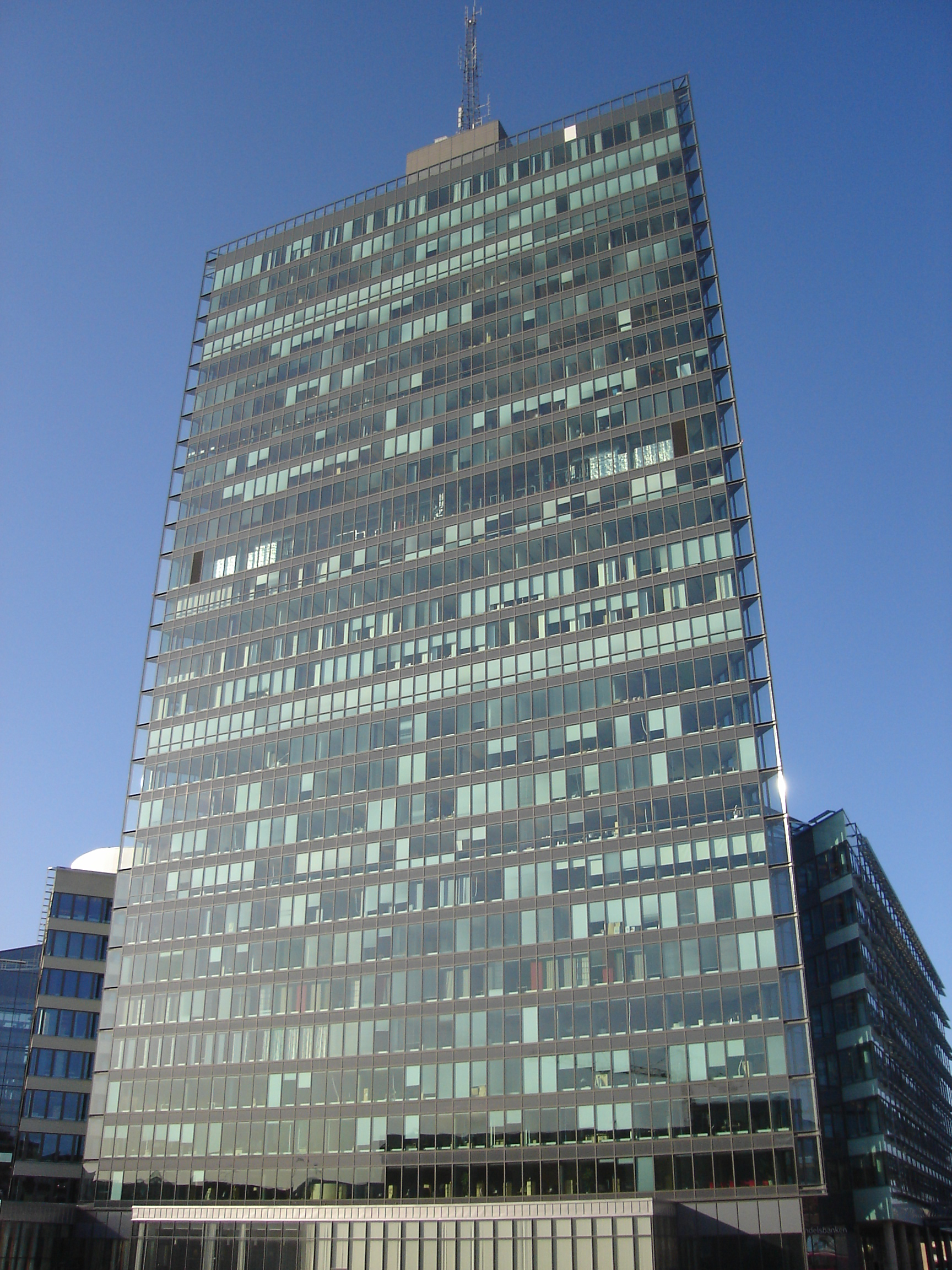
Kista Science Tower, 2003

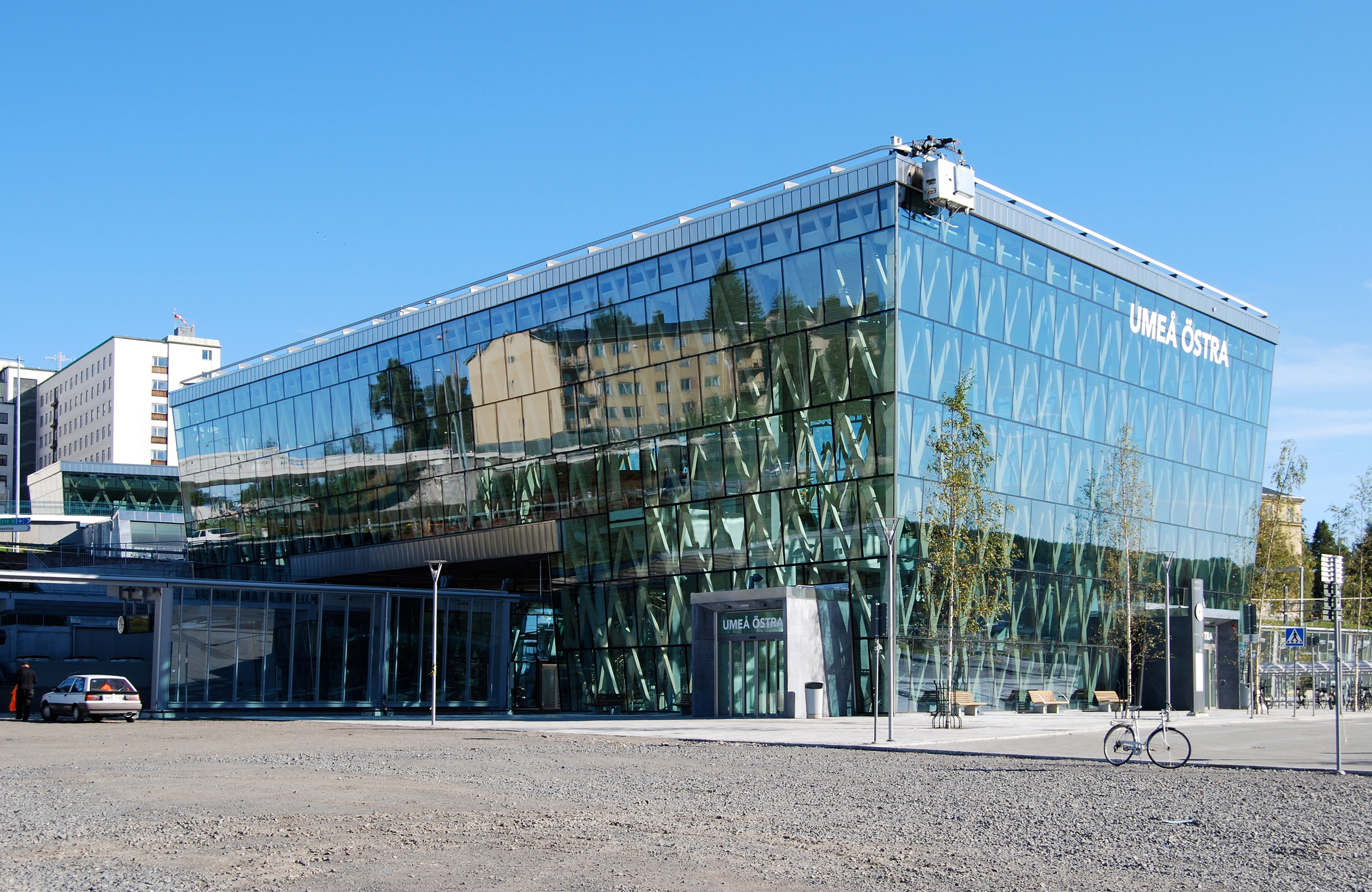
Umeå East Station, 2010

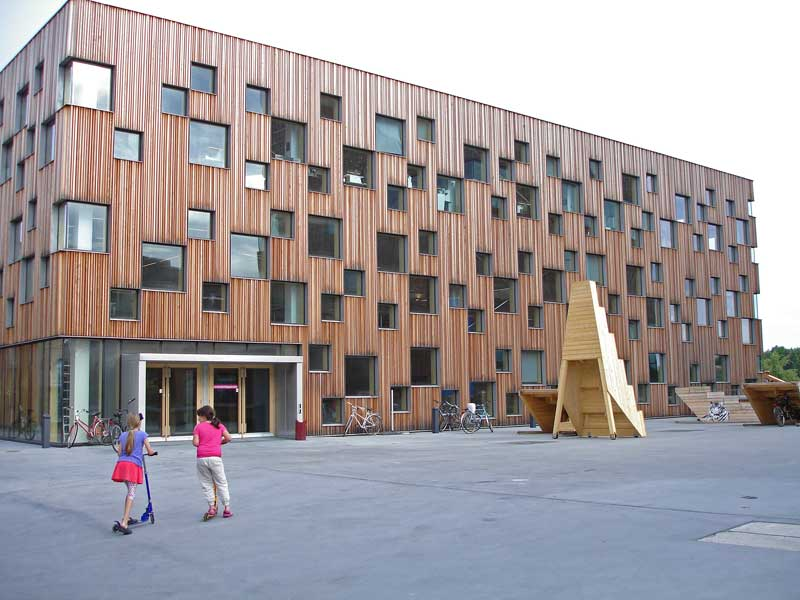
Umeå School of Architecture, 2010

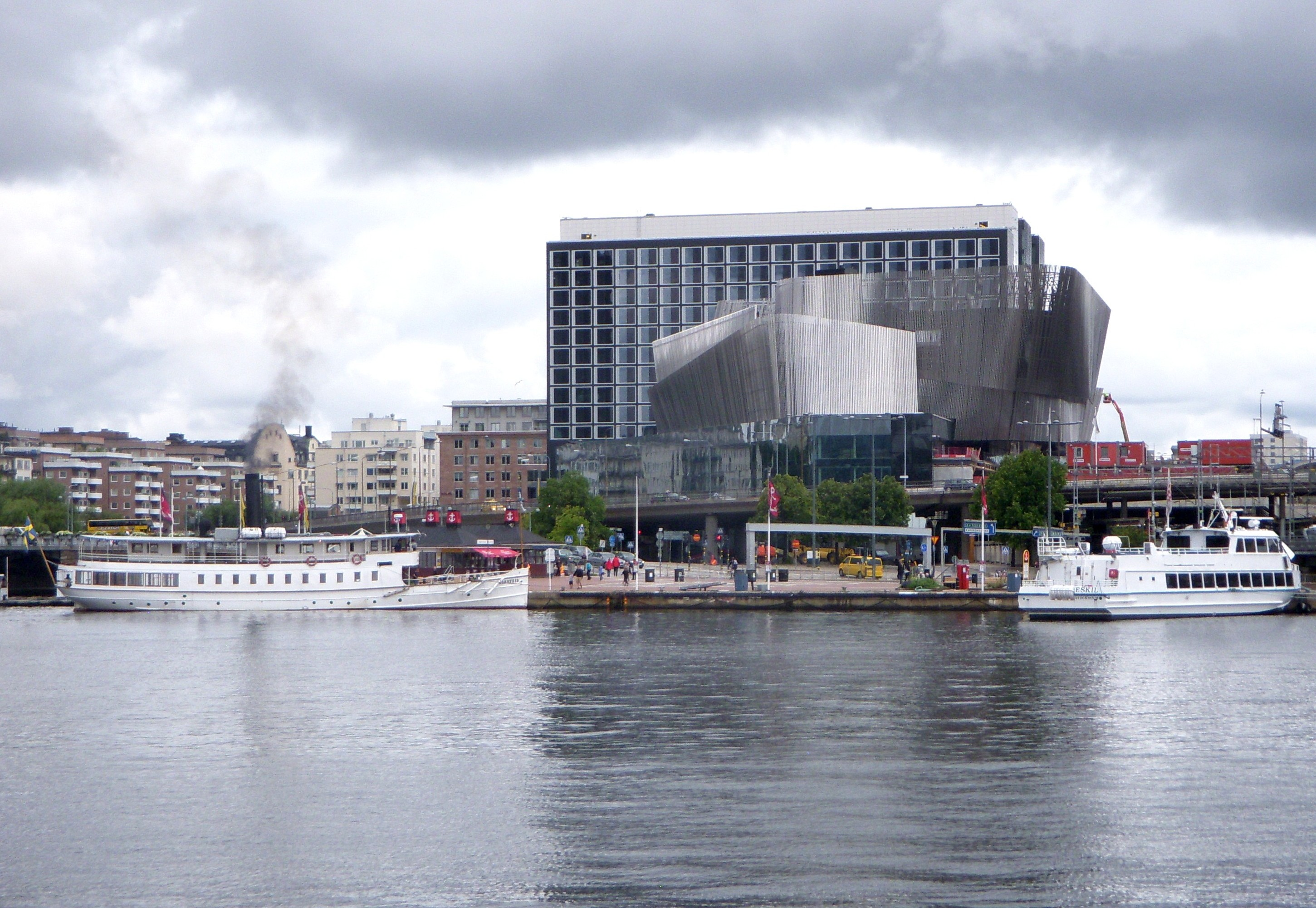
Stockholm Waterfront, 2011

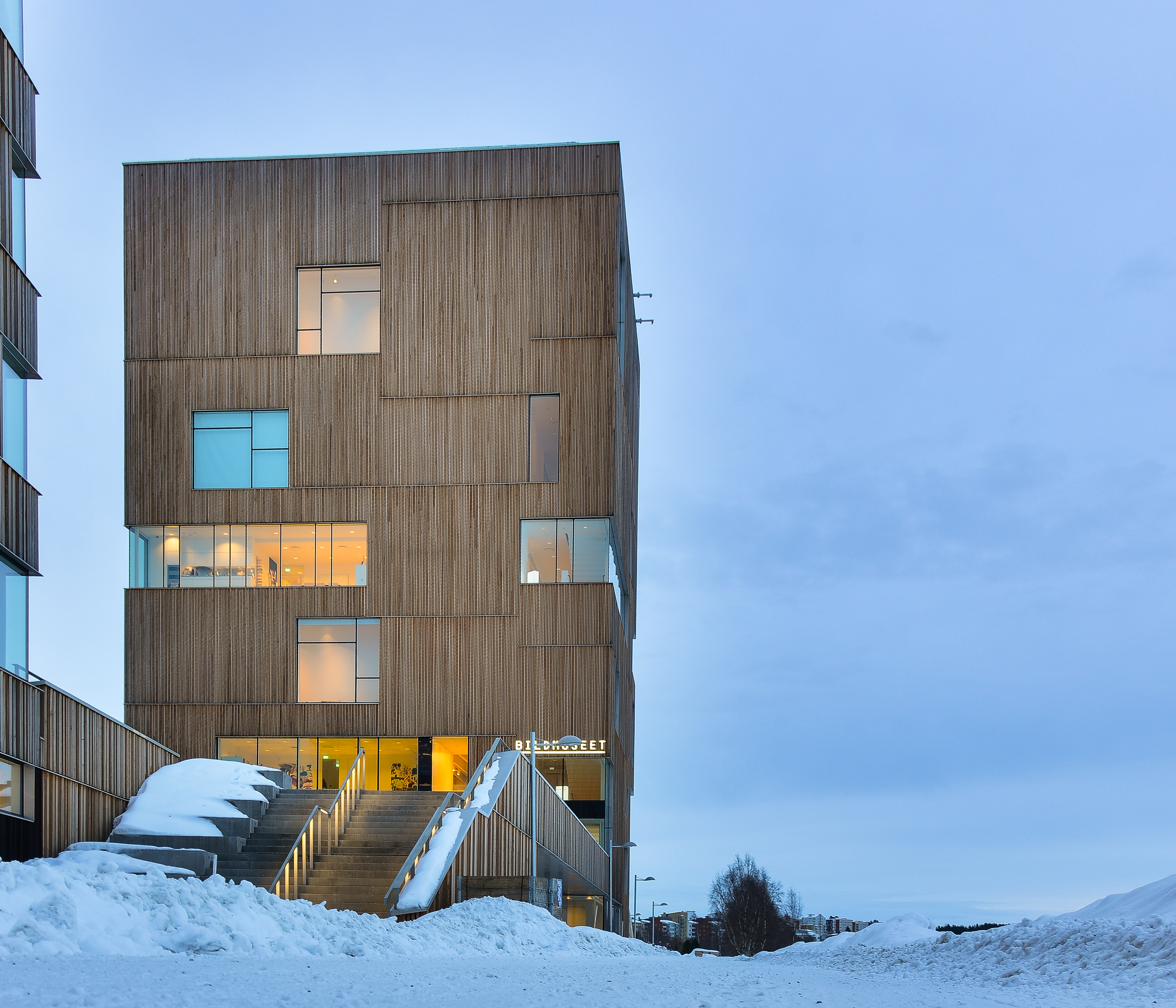
Bildmuseet, 2012

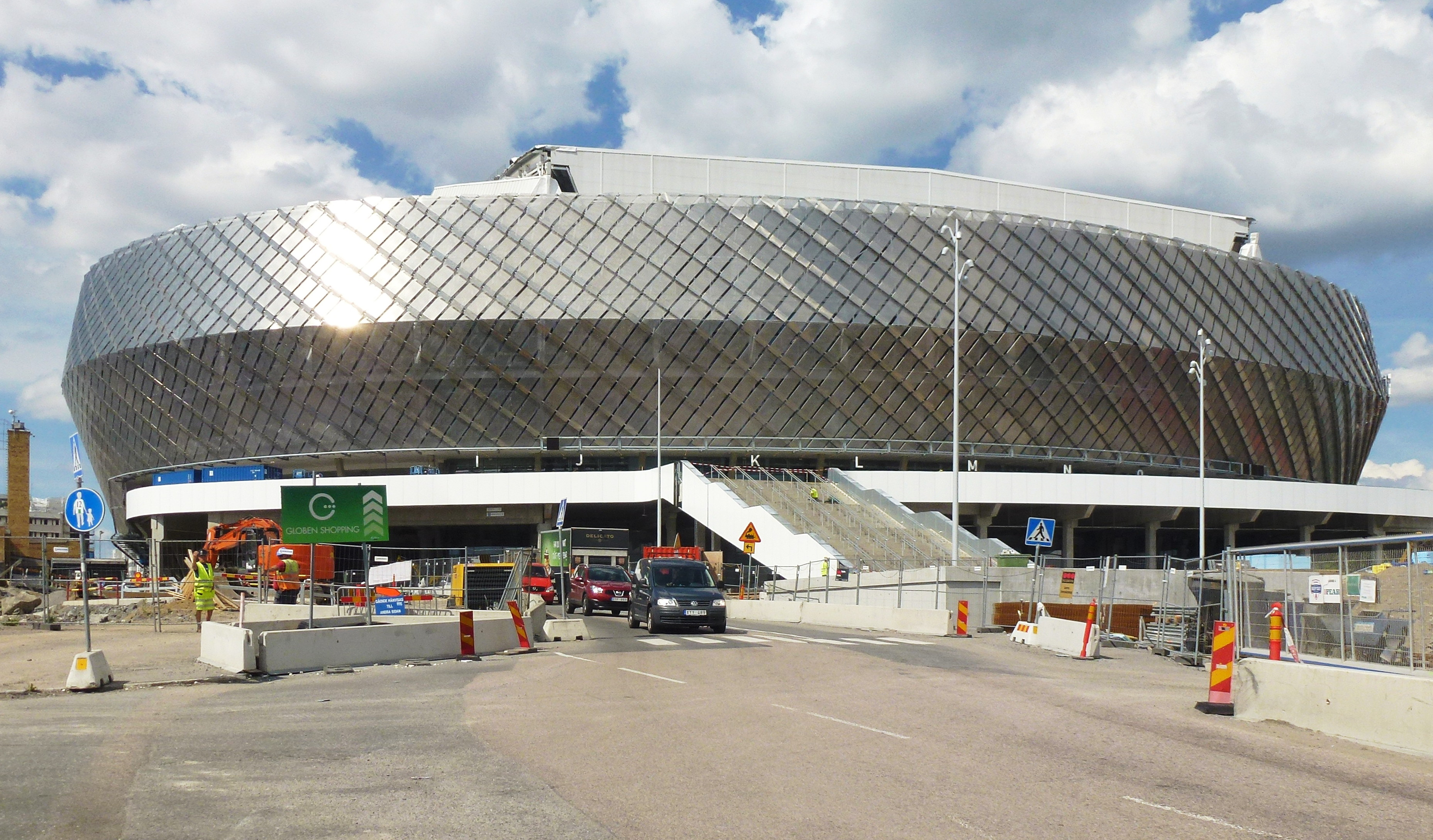
Tele2 Arena, 2013
