= Malmö Konsthall =

Swedish art museum

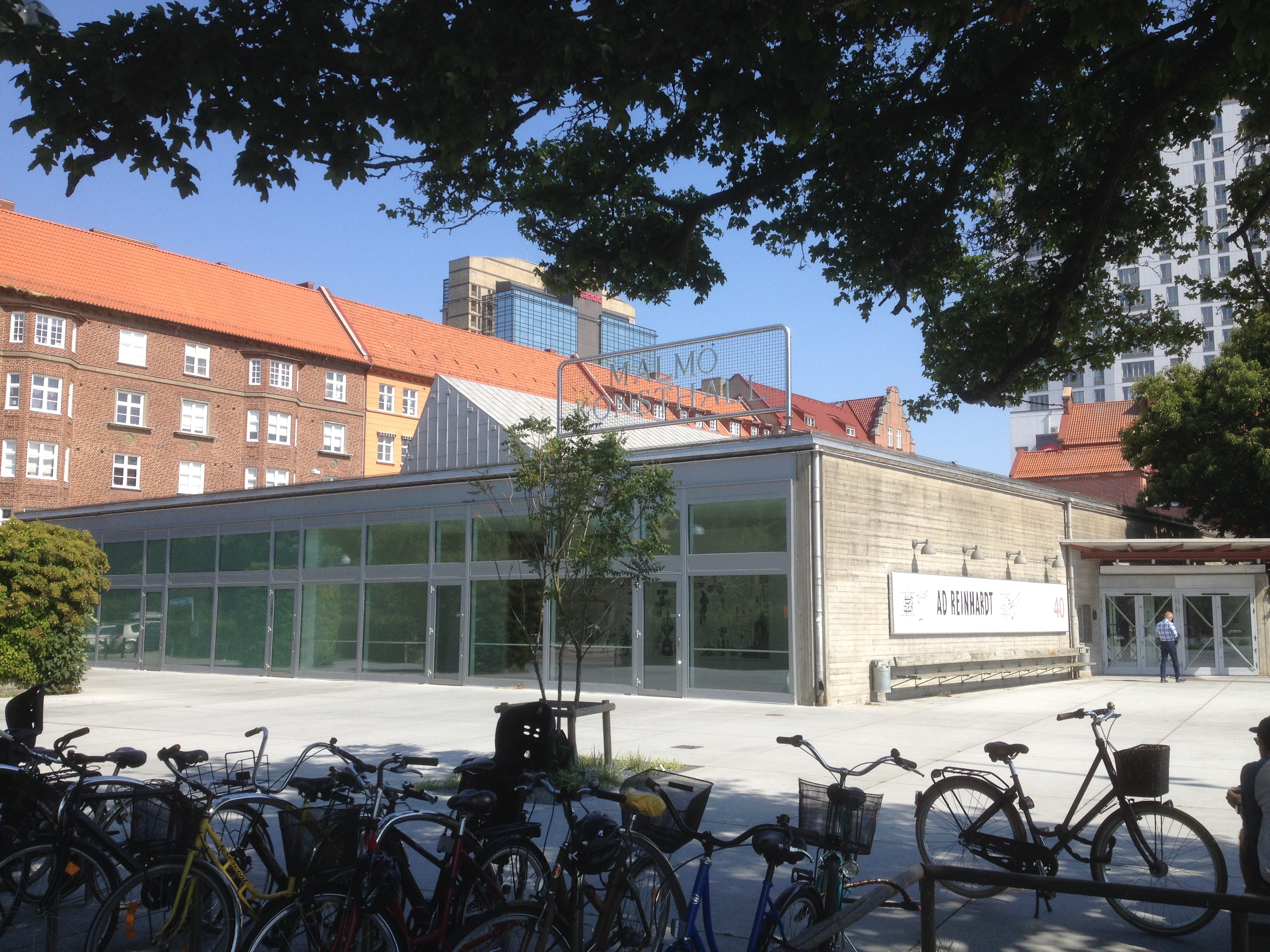
- Established: 1975
- Location: Malmö, Scania, Sweden
- Coordinates: 55.595403°N 12.999128°E
- Website: malmokonsthall.se

Malmö Konsthall is an exhibition hall located in the center of Malmö, Sweden. It is one of the largest exhibition halls for contemporary art in Europe.

== Building ==
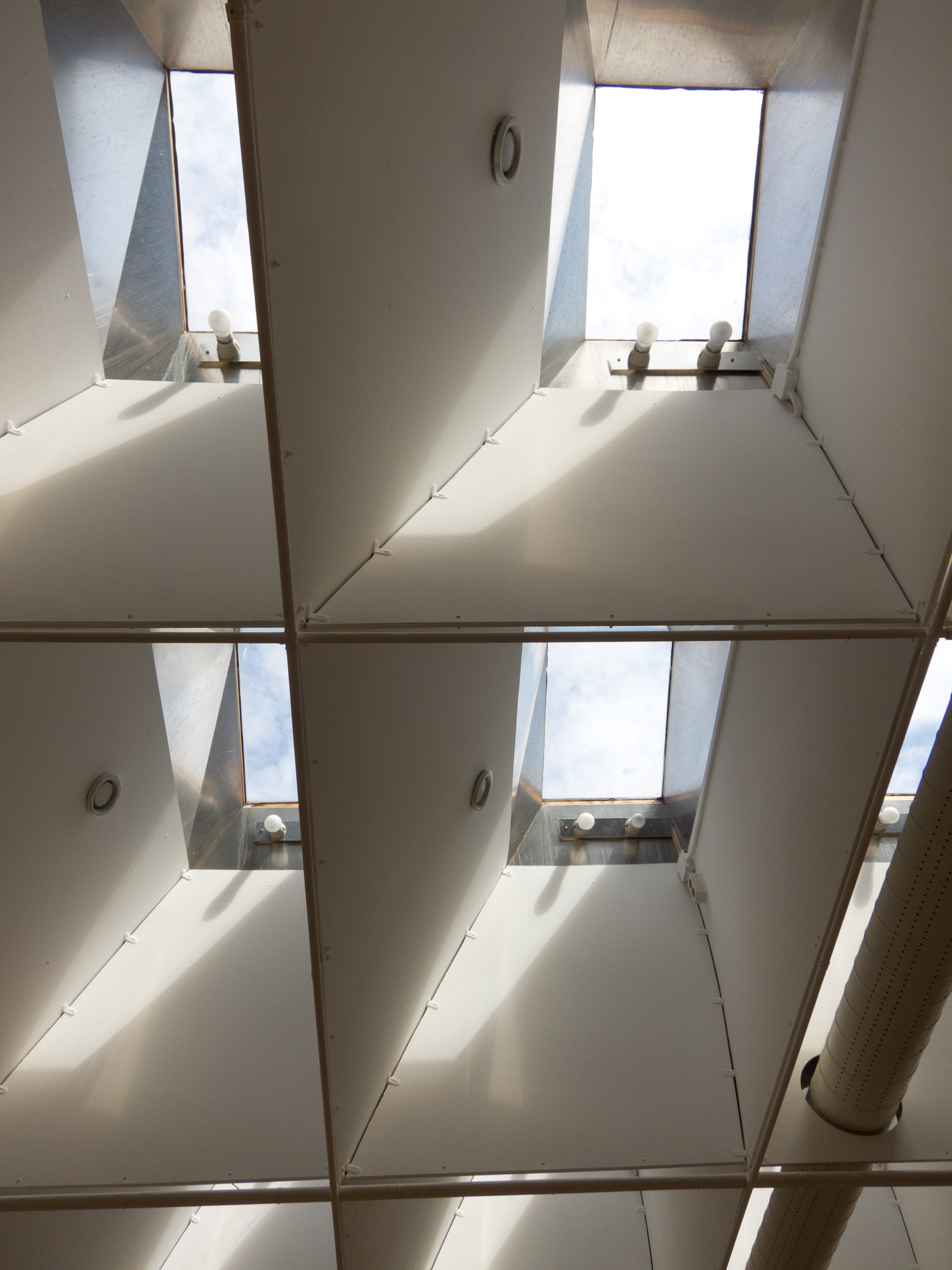
Ceiling

The hall was designed by architect Klas Anshelm (1914–1980), who was inspired by the Paris studio of the sculptor Constantin Brâncuși. It was built between 1971–1974 and is constructed of concrete, glass, wood and aluminium. The ceiling is made of domes with natural and artificial light sources. The light well has a large sloping skylight admitting northern light. The building was awarded the 1974 Kasper Salin Prize by the Swedish Association of Architects.

The gallery was renovated in 1994, connecting the older brick building next door (Hantverkshuset or Craft Building) with the exhibition hall, and thus gaining space for a book store selling books, posters and postcards, a children’s area and a restaurant that offers Swedish food.

== Exhibitions ==
The hall arranges exhibitions of international work that included modern art classics and current experiments. Usually there are about ten different exhibitions each year, attracting over 200,000 visitors. Exhibitions of well-known artists have included Edvard Munch, Van Gogh, Louise Bourgeois and David Shrigley. Other exhibitions have shown Kandinsky, Klee, Joan Miró, Giovanni Giacometti, Keith Haring, Andres Serrano, Peter Greenaway and Tony Cragg. In addition to painting and sculpture, the hall is used for events such as theater performances, films and lectures. The Malmö Konsthall also organizes many educational activities for adults and children.

A travel guide says of the center "In our view, no other venue in southern Sweden so effectively mingles contemporary architecture with modern paintings". Another guide says "even if there was no art there, would be worth visiting for its use of light and space".

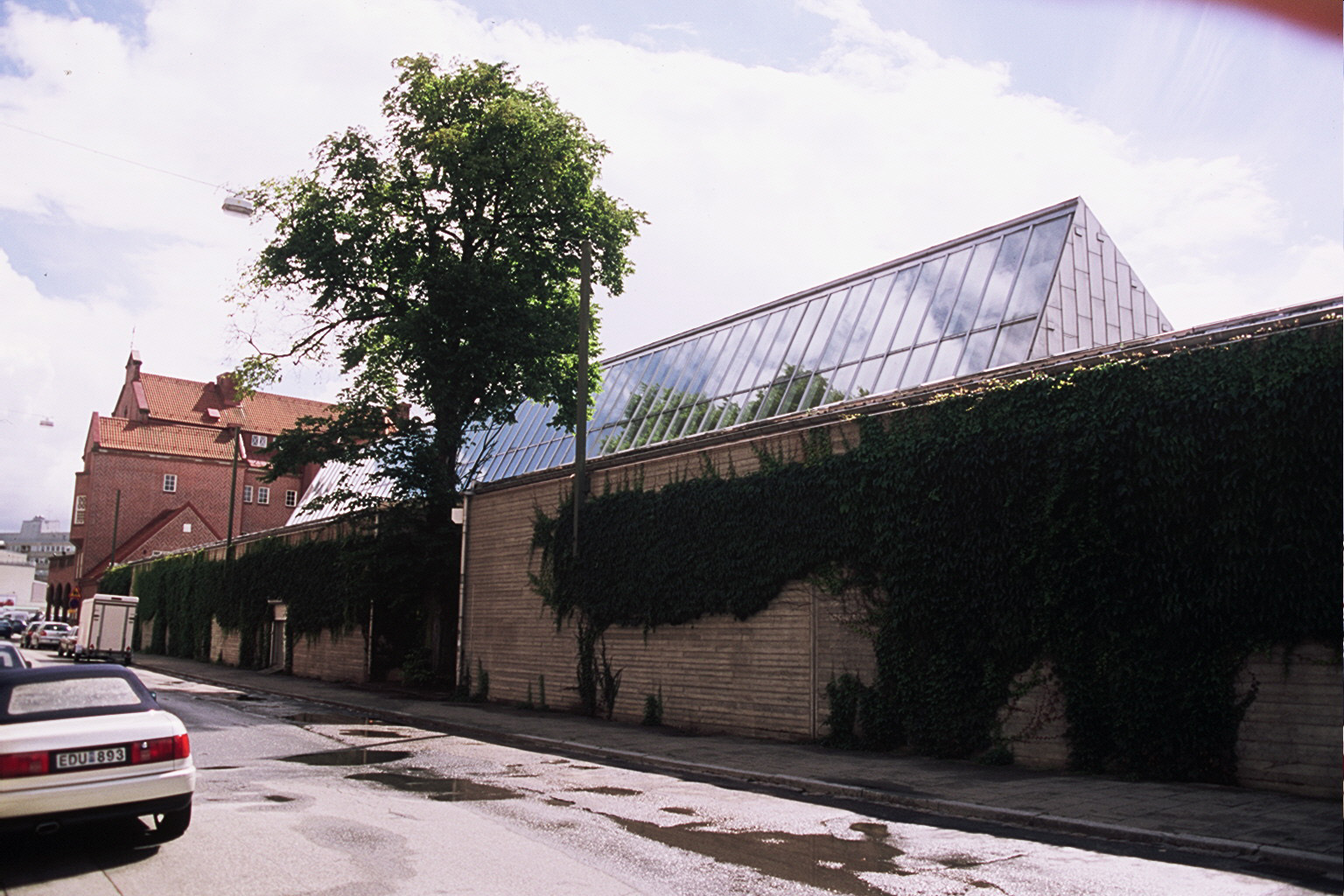
Exterior of the hall showing the north-facing skylight

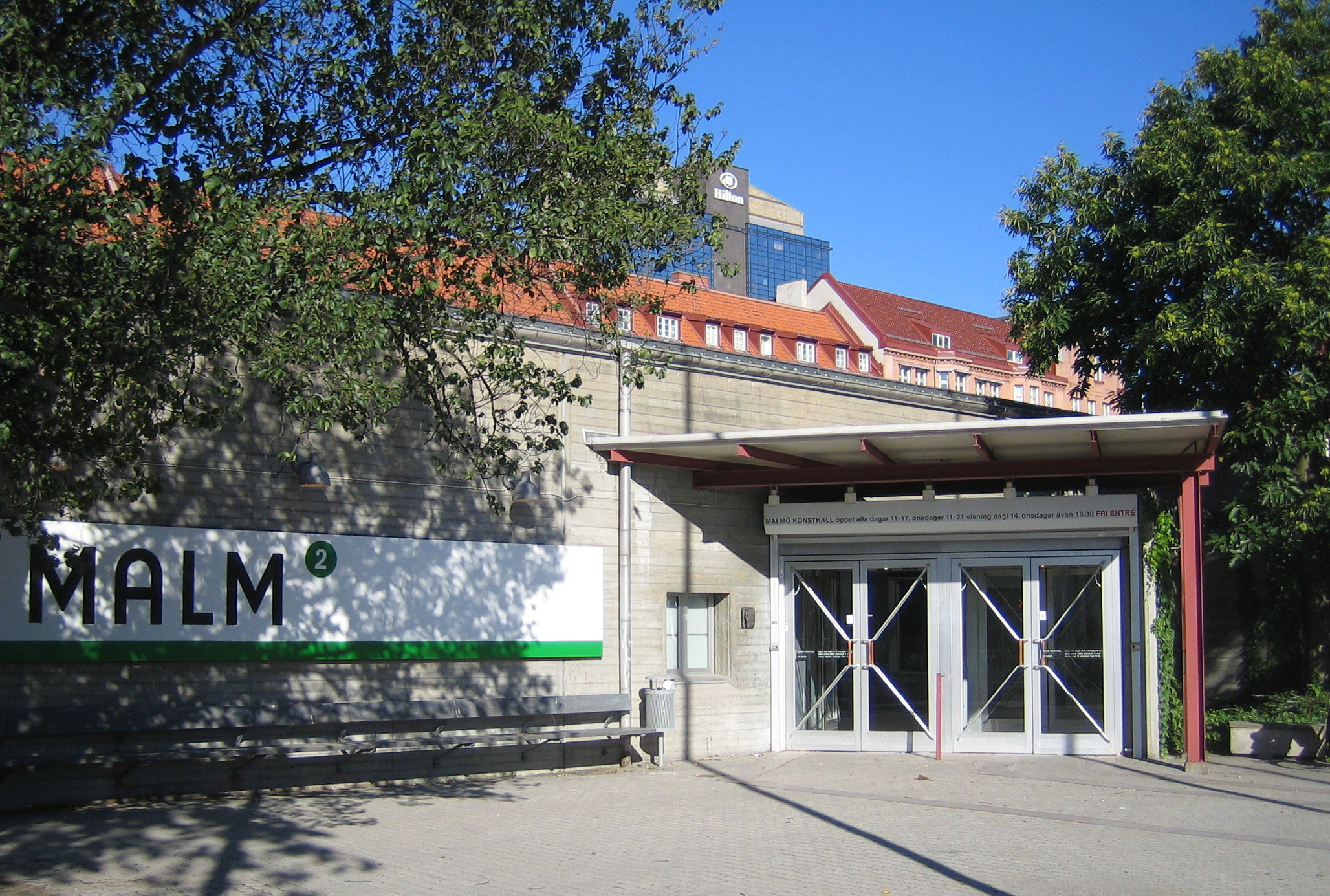
Entrance from the exterior

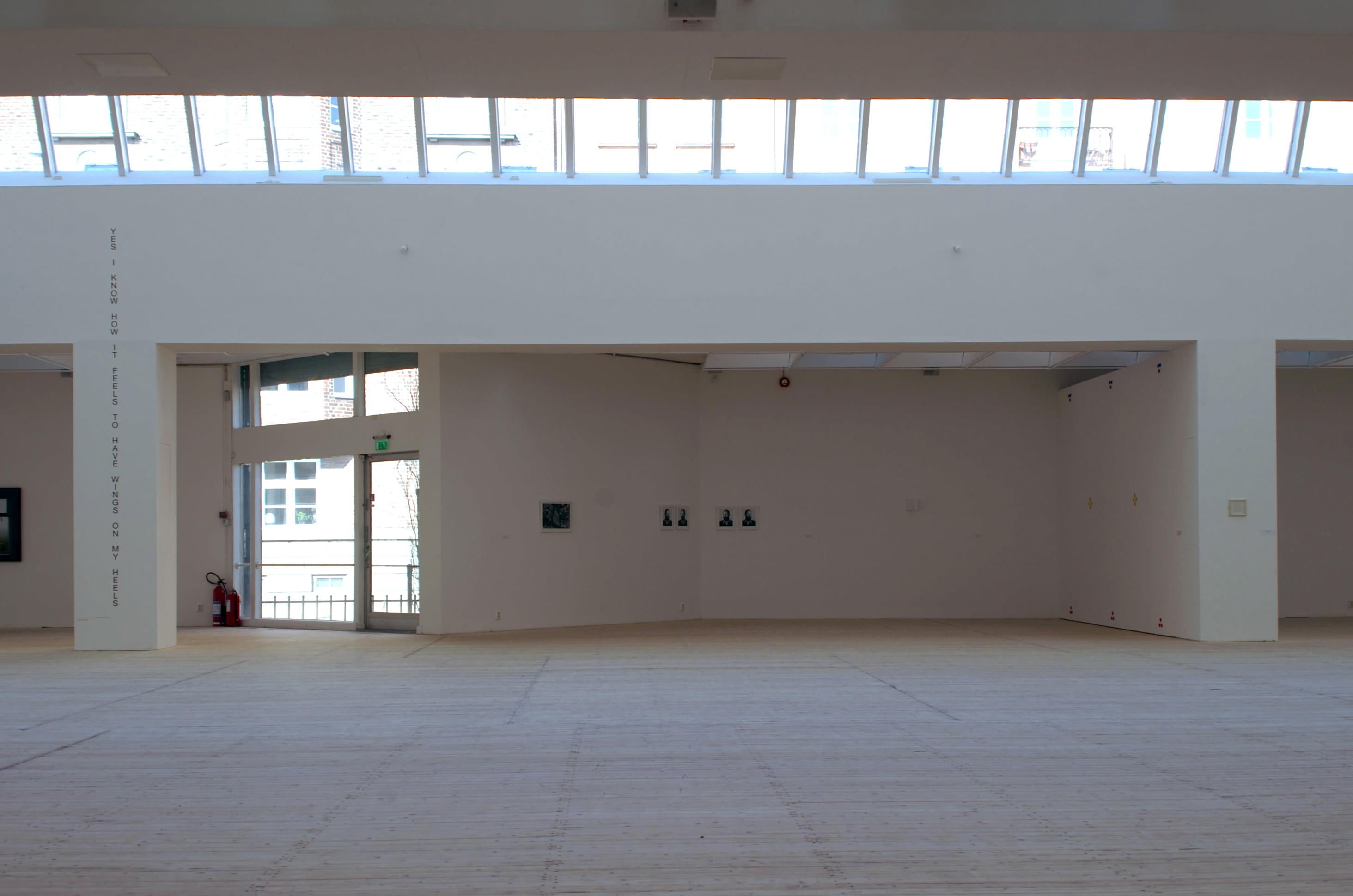
Entrance from the interior

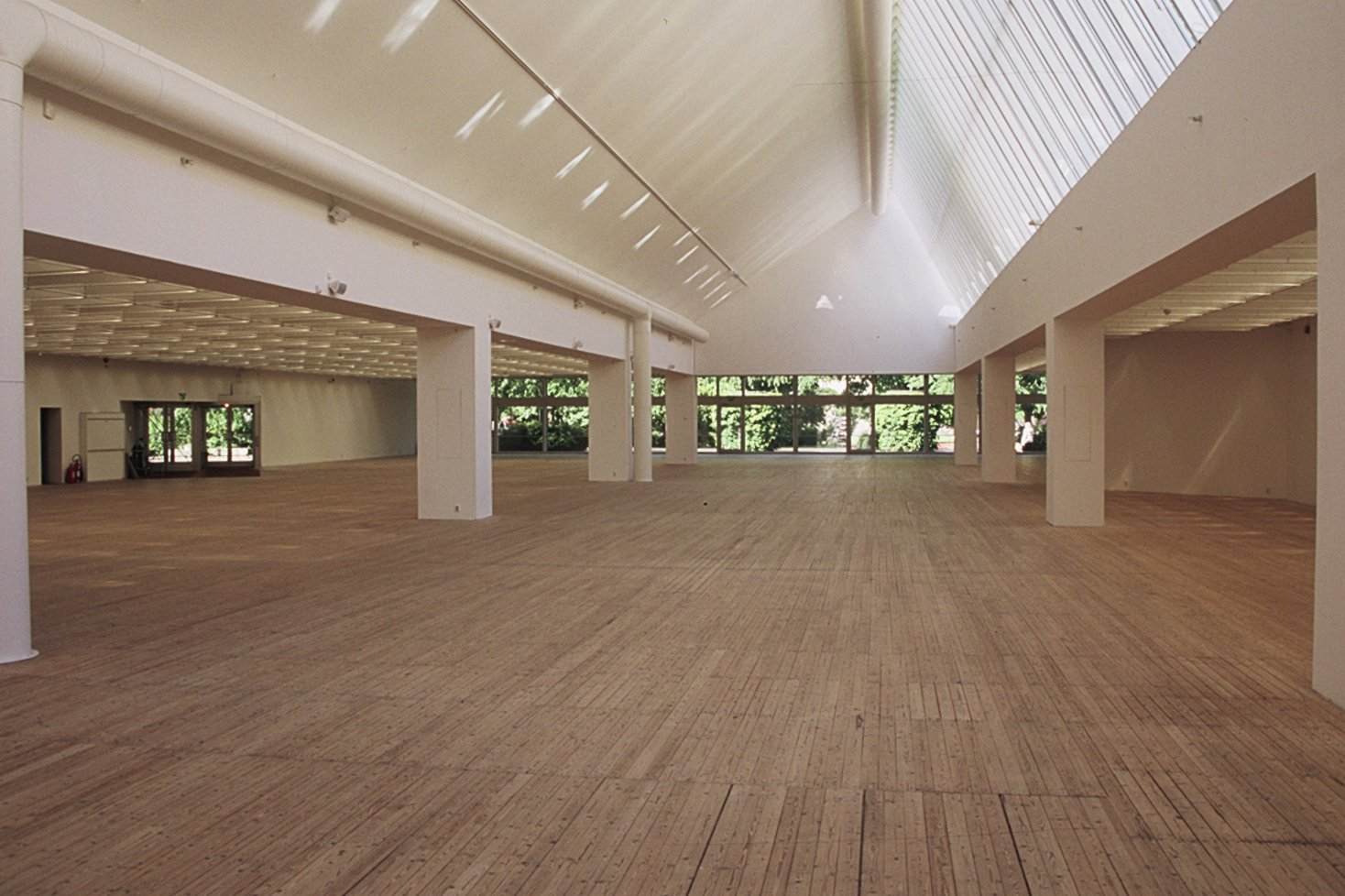
Interior

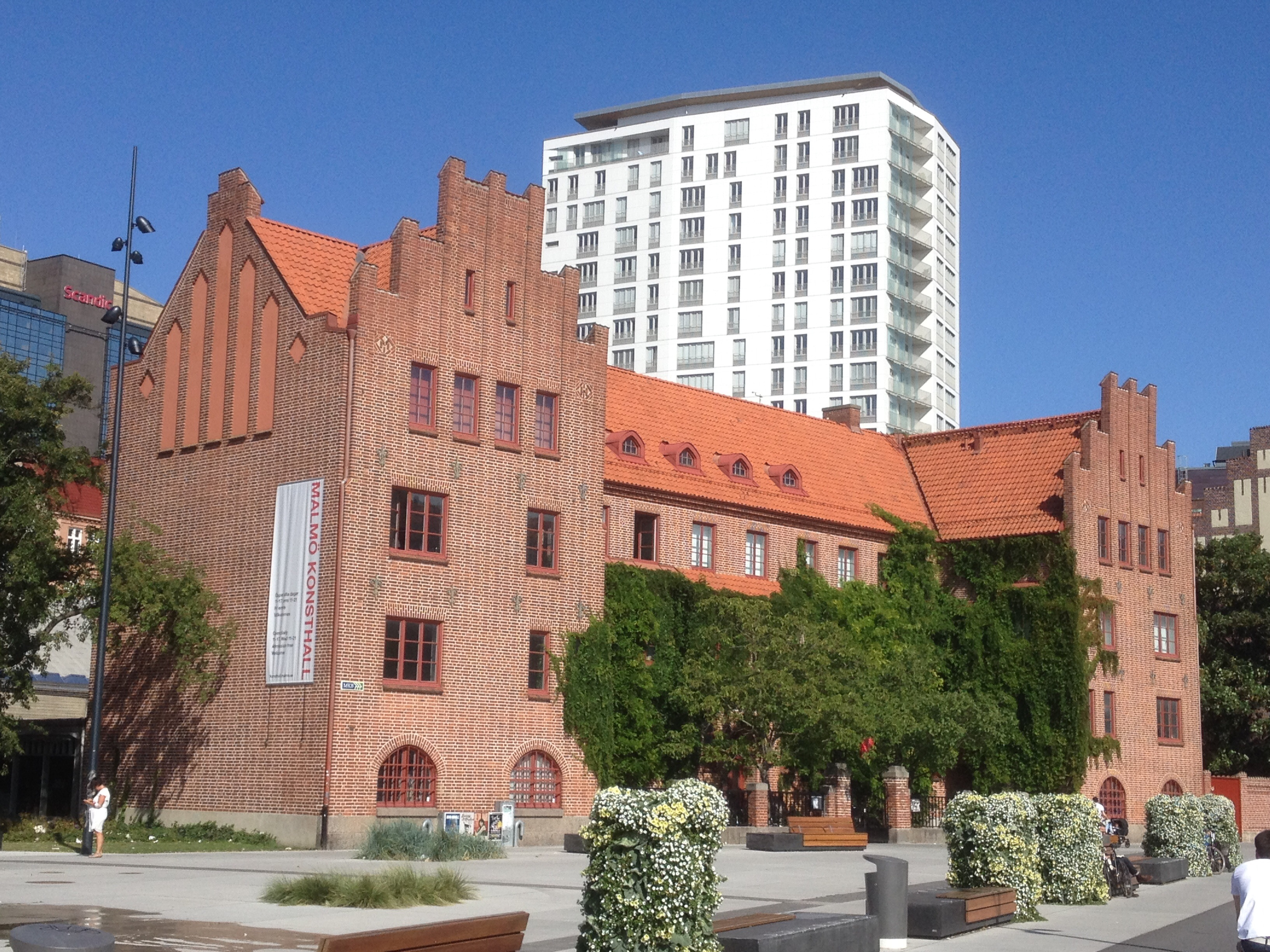
Hantverkshuset

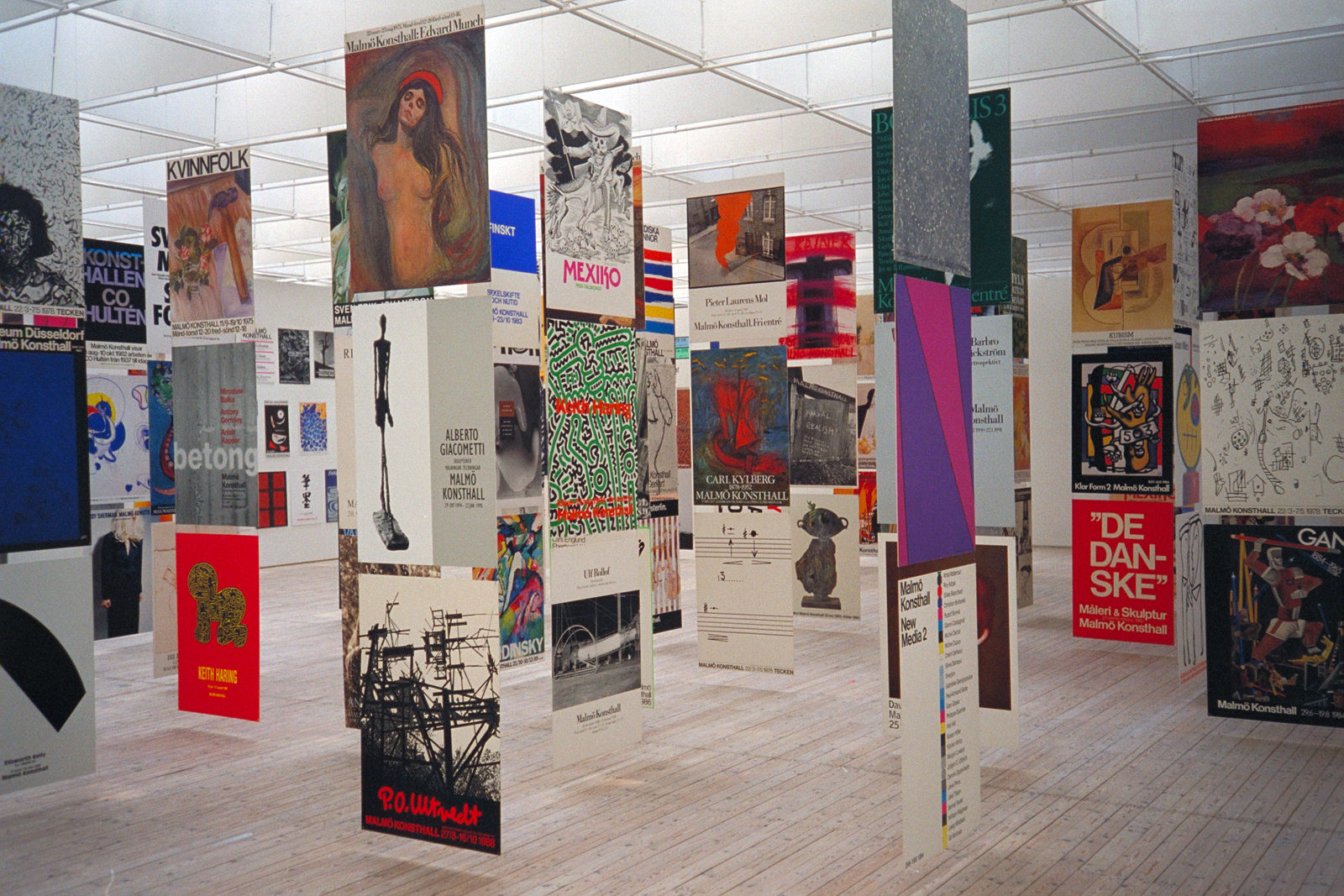
Exhibition posters. Malmö konsthall's 25th anniversary in 2000.
