= Kulturväven =

Coordinates: 63.8251°N 20.2600°E

Väven
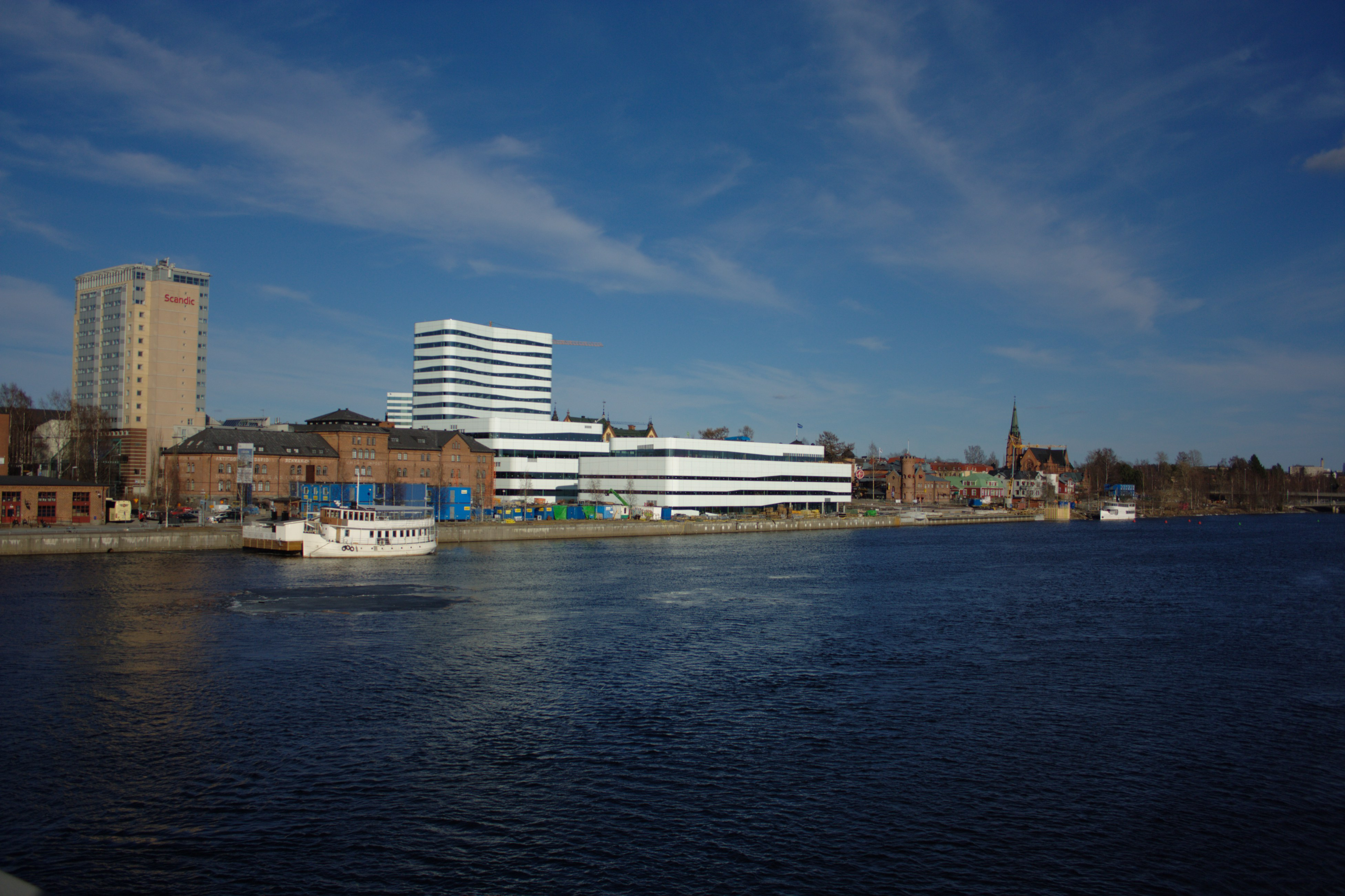
- Kulturväven photographed from Tegsbron in March 2014.
- Alternative names: Kulturväven

General information
- Town or city: Umeå
- Country: Sweden
- Inaugurated: 21 November 2014
- Cost: 700 million kronor, excluding the interior.

Design and construction
- Architecture firm: White arkitekter, Snøhetta

Website
- http://kulturvaven.se/

Väven is a cultural center in Umeå, Sweden located next to Ume River. Väven opened in late November 2014, the year that Umeå were one of the two European Capital of Culture. Culture fabric will include several cultural institutions that have been moved from other parts of town, as well as some new cultural initiatives. Building costs, the collaborations that have formed and the relocation of the town library to the new building has caused debate in Umeå.

== The Building ==
The building covers most of the block Heimdal and is located in central Umeå, between Storgatan and the Ume River. Väven was built in 2011-2014 as part of the urban development project City between the bridges. The client is Umeå Municipality and the local real estate company Balticgruppen, through the jointly owned company Väven in Umeå AB.

Väven consists of two buildings which merges into one on the third floor, forming a portal above Strandgatan. The house closest to the river, south of Strandgatan, consists of four floors and includes a so-called "black box", with space for 400 seated or 1,000 standing visitors. The four lower levels of the building closest to the road Storgatan have about 15,000 square meters of area that Umeå municipality disposes of their businesses, including libraries. There is also a covered market hall in direct proximity to the Stora Hotellet. Level 5 and above is dominated by the U&Me hotel, conference venues and a restaurant in the Balticgruppen's auspices.

The total area is 24,000 square meters, and the total cost has been estimated at 700 million, excluding the interior. The architects are Norwegian Snøhetta and White arkitekter, who also collaborated in the construction of several of the buildings on Umeå Arts Campus.

However, even before the inauguration the rather daring design in this context was portrayed as a plagiarism, since three vertical slums with similar facades already had been erected in Copenhagen in 2006–2008. The Danish buildings were designed by the Danish firm Vilhelm Lauritzen Arkitekter, which had nothing to do with the design of Väven. An architect from the firm however states that Väven is not plagiarism.

== Activities ==
Väven includes studios, a children's cultural center, theaters and Umeå City Library, the cinema Folkets Bio and the new Women's History Museum.
