= SJ Euronight =

Night train service in Europe

SJ/RDC EuroNight
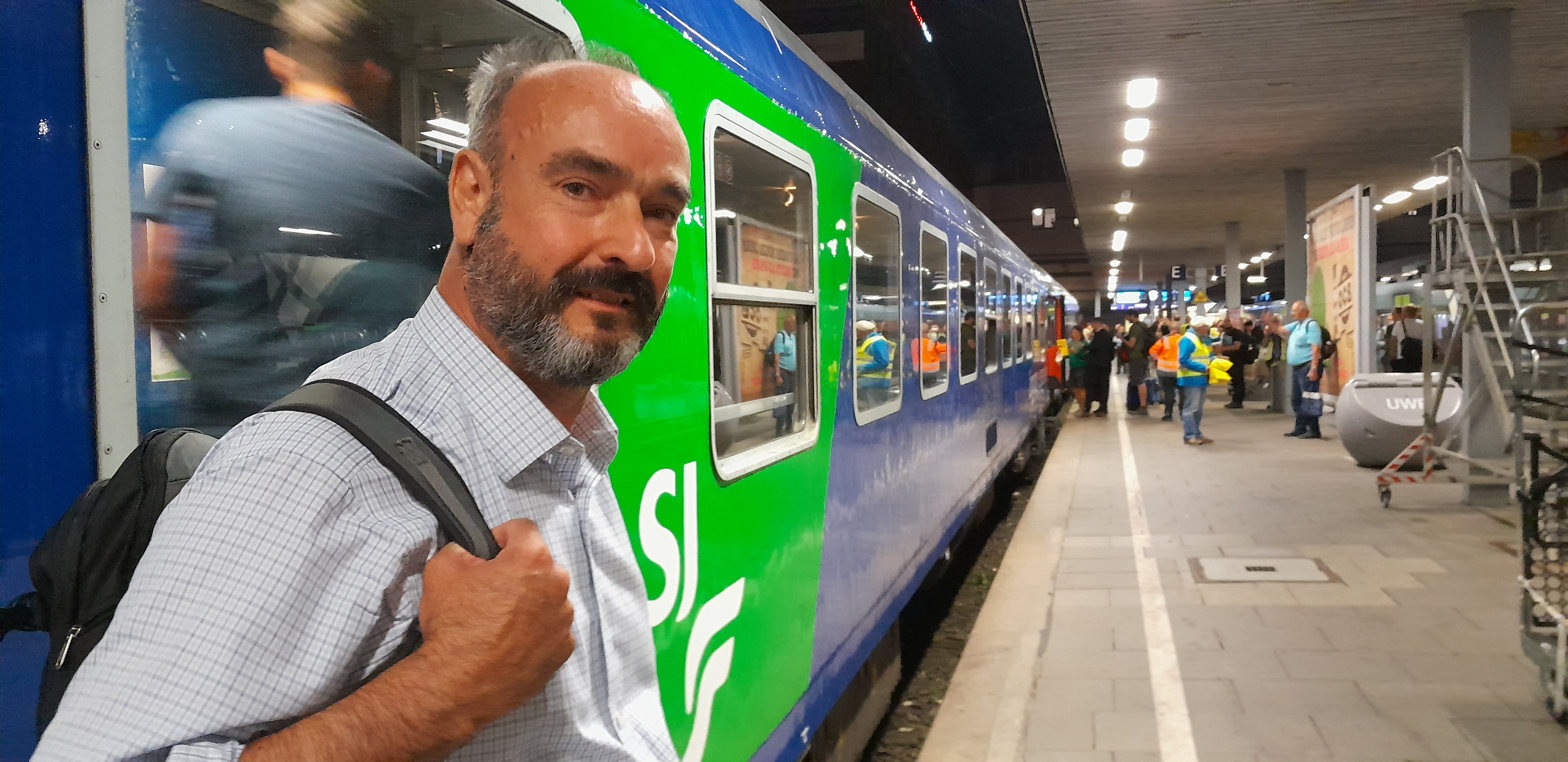
- Mark Smith (Seat61) on the inaugural SJ EuroNight departure in 2022

Overview
- Predecessor: SJ Euronight
- First service: 1 September 2022
- Current operators: BahnTouristikExpress (RDC); SJ AB
- Former operators: Hector Rail (Padborg‒Malmö, 2022‒2024)
- Website: www.nachtexpress.de/en/

Route
- Termini: Stockholm Central; Berlin Lichtenberg
- Stops: Norrköping C.; Linköping C.; Nässjö; Hässleholm; Lund Central; Copenhagen Airport; Padborg; Hamburg Hbf
- Average journey time: 15 hours
- Service frequency: nightly
- Train numbers: EN 344 (Mon,Wed,Fri); EN 345 (Tue,Thu,Sat)
- Lines used: Western Main Line; Grödingebanan; Southern Main Line; Continental Line; Øresund Line; Copenhagen–Fredericia; Fredericia–Padborg; Neumünster–Flensburg; Hamburg-Altona–Kiel; Hamburg-Altona link line; Berlin–Hamburg

On-board services
- Disabled access: Wheelchair-accessible (PRM) compartment
- Seating arrangements: International seated (Stockholm‒Berlin)
- Sleeping arrangements: Couchette (1‒6 passengers); Sleeping car (1‒2 passengers); En-suite Deluxe Sleeping car (1‒3 passengers)
- Catering facilities: Mini-Kiosk (Germany; Sweden))
- Baggage facilities: Private compartment, or second bed required

Technical
- Track gauge: 1,435 mm (4 ft 8 1/2 in)
- Operating speed: 160 km/h (100 mph)
- Rake maintenance: Hagalund Depot; Berlin-Lichtenberg; Talgo (Deutschland)

SJ/RDC EuroNight (EN 344/345), is a night train service between Stockholm Central Station in Sweden and Berlin-Lichtenberg in Germany, via the Copenhagen Airport, and Hamburg Hauptbahnhof.

The SJ/RDC EuroNight is part of the EuroNight (EN) network, and operates with sleeping cars, couchette cars and seated carriages.

The line historically had been operated by the Swedish National Railways (SJ AB), however on September 1. 2026, the Railroad Development Corporation (RDC) took over operations for the following 3 months.

SJ is however planned to return in a joint operation of the EuroNight line from December 13, 2026.

== History ==
In January 2020, the Swedish Transport Administration (Trafikverket) published a draft investigation into the re-introduction of night trains between Sweden and Germany. This investigation proposed routes such as Malmö‒Cologne‒Aachen and Stockholm‒Malmö‒Hamburg.

A year later in January 2021, Trafikverket put out an invitation to tender for a night train service between Sweden and Germany, which should begin operations by August 2022.

Around the same time as Trafikverket had put out the tender - VGR, the Regional council of Västra Götaland, had separately investigated and proposed a route via Oslo‒Gothenburg‒Hamburg.

And in June 2021, a bill had successfully been put through to amend the Danish law covering the operation of railways within Denmark to allow for Trafikverket to procure overnight train services along the railway spanning from the Swedish border by Copenhagen to the German border, via Padborg.

The tender would be won by SJ AB, to operate the EuroNight line for 4 years from 2022 until 2026, with up to 244 nights per year eligible for financial assistance. This assistance would only however come from the governments of Sweden and Denmark, as the German government was not willing to provide funding to the line for its operations within Germany.

Notably during the tender bidding process, an existing operator Snälltåget would not participate as a form of protest, citing concerns over a lack of fair competition.

The Railway Gazette International stated when covering the topic;

"Announcing on April 22 its decision not to bid, [Snälltåget] again emphasised that the proposed Stockholm – Brussels service raised a ‘significant risk that another operator could operate services with state aid from Sweden and Denmark’ in competition with its own overnight trains."

As a compromise to Snälltåget's concerns, SJ would ultimately only receive financial support for months in which Snälltåget were not in operation on the line, which would ultimately total 190 nights per year wherein SJ would receive subsidy.

In operation, the SJ EuroNight would see success in ridership, despite a number of operational issues over the years. - This however would not be enough to offset the cost of operating the route.

When it came time to renew the tender for EN344/345, the Swedish government had decided to cut funding for the line after its initial contract was set to expire in 2026.

To prevent the full closure of the EuroNight line however, RDC Deutschland stepped in to resume its operations from the 1st of September 2026. This being with the caveat that RDC would not be eligible to receive a state subsidy for their operations.

Additionally, Snälltåget would still operate the line in SJ's absence.

While RDC did prevent the EuroNight line from fully shutting down, their management of the line has not yet proven sustainable. Of note, ticket sales had suffered a drastic reduction since their takeover, and service frequency had seen a notable reduction.

In light of this, SJ has once again stepped up to assist in operating the EuroNight line between Stockholm and Berlin. The plan as it stands now is for SJ to begin joint operation of the route with RDC, starting from December 13, 2026.

SJ's reasoning for this can be found In a statement made by Christer Litzell, in which he says that more than half of the passengers who regularly use the EuroNight service are Swedish - He follows that to ensure the continued viability of this rail service, a Swedish company needs to step in to act as a more known and trusted brand which the Swedish people are more comfortable putting their faith into, than the otherwise unfamiliar Railway Development Corporation.

== Route ==
The route ran from Stockholm through Sweden down the Southern Main Line to Malmö, across Denmark using the Øresund Bridge, Great Belt Bridge and Little Belt Bridge, then within Germany via the Rendsburg High Bridge towards Hamburg—initially ending at Hamburg-Altona station.

From April 1. 2023 the service inside Germany was extended via the Hamburg Hbf and onwards to Berlin, running as an open-access operator with SJ operating the extension into Germany at its own risk. During the summer months, Snälltåget would additionally run night trains alongside the SJ Euronight trains on the Berlin‒Stockholm route.

SJ had originally planned to extend the new service south-west of Hamburg through the Ruhr-area of Germany in the direction of Cologne, to better serve travellers continuing towards London, Paris, Amsterdam, and parts of Western Europe. When no acceptable timetable or rolling stock solution could be found, a reserve Plan B heading south-west of Hamburg was initiated.

For 2026, several weekend closures of the Swedish Southern Main Line meant diversions via the West Coast Line to Gothenburg Central Station.

Since the change in operator from SJ to RDC, the EN344/345 would notably stop serving Malmö Central, and instead call at Lund Central as its final stop within Sweden.

As it stands now, the full route as is follows;

Berlin(-Lichtenberg / Gesundbrunnen*) ‒ Hamburg Hbf ‒ Padborg ‒ Copenhagen Airport ‒ Lund [‒ Mölndals nedre (Göteborg)**] [‒ Hässelholm ‒ Alvesta ‒ Nässjö ‒ Linköping ‒ Norrköping] ‒ Stockholm Central

*In Berlin - trains depart towards Stockholm from Lichtenberg (EN344), and arrive from Stockholm in Gesundbrunnen (EN345)

**on certain days all stops between Stockholm and Lund will not be served, with an extra stop at Mölndals nedre (Göteborg)

== Rolling stock ==
In 2021 Austrian Federal Railways (ÖBB) proposed the use of refurbished AB32 sleeping carriages. From the start of service on 1 September 2022 only couchette carriages could be used. Delays in authorising rolling stock through Denmark, meant initial trains consisted of two couchette carriages. After 7 December 2022 sleeping cars started to be added to the SJ Euronight. From 3 October 2024, five seated cars were available, thus enabling the previous couchette carriages to return to being available for passengers wishing to sleep.

SJ began operating the train using SJ Rc6 locomotives between Stockholm and Malmö. Alstom Traxx locomotives from Hector Rail were chosen for the journey across Denmark, instead of locomotives from DSB. In mid-December 2024, SJ took over full operation to the Denmark–Germany border at Padborg using their own drivers, for this SJ used Siemens Vectron locomotives leased from Green Cargo across Denmark. Starting in September 2026 a single Vectron locomotive has been used for the whole route—rented by RDC from Railpool.

Inside Germany the train is operated with locomotives and crew from BahnTouristikExpress, a part of Railroad Development Corporation, on behalf of SJ.

=== Bistro ===
Until August 2026, a Swedish SJ RB7 Bistro buffet car from SJ AB (Swedish Railways) was attached to the train between Stockholm and Malmö Central The Swedish Bistro carriage could not operate in Denmark or Germany and had to be uncoupled in Malmö.

In 2023, SJ had additionally purchased three, or four, dining cars from Germany for potential renovation. As of November 2026, no new decisions had been made about refurbishment.

=== 2026 ===
The original public service obligation contract ran until the beginning of September 2026. Partial financial support remained until 31 July 2026, with SJ continuing to run the service for another month until 31 August 2026.

We have operated on commercial terms almost half the route throughout the full year, and the entire route six months a year, … even though we have had many passengers and the trains have often been fully booked during peak season, it is definitely not profitable for SJ if you exclude the government support.

— Christer Litzell, SJ, in Järnvägar.nu (October 2025)

=== Future ===
During mid-2025, SJ had registered future interest in running a night train Oslo‒Copenhagen or Oslo‒Copenhagen‒Hamburg‒Berlin. The night trains would consist of a restaurant wagon, one or two seated carriages (60‒120 seats) and five overnight couchette or sleeping cars (up to 244 beds).

As of October 2025, Railroad Development Corporation (RDC) had proposed to continue operation of the Stockholm‒Malmö‒Hamburg‒Berlin route on a commercial basis with 50% of the previous number of departures. RDC had already been providing carriages and personal for the SJ Euronight service. Each eight-carriage train has 390 spaces: 60 in sleeping carriages, 210 in couchettes, and 120 seats.

RDC were investigating the possibility of assembling a single longer twelve-carriage train with four sleeping cars. The train would then run with three roundtrips per week, instead of daily. Departure frequency could be further reduced during November and January/February months.

In May 2026, a provisional winter timetable for October‒December 2026 was published:

Train 345 (southbound)
leaving Sweden on Tuesday/Thursday/Saturday evenings from Stockholm Central Station; arriving into Germany on Wednesday/Friday/Sunday mornings at Hamburg Hauptbahnhof, extended on Friday/Sunday mornings to Berlin Gesundbrunnen station.
Train 344 (northbound)
leaving Germany on Monday/Wednesday/Friday nights from Hamburg Hauptbahnhof and starting on Monday/Friday evenings from Berlin-Lichtenberg station; arriving into Sweden on Tuesday/Thursday/Saturday mornings.

=== 2027 ===
In November 2026, SJ and RDC announced a joint-operation of the night train service between Stockholm and Germany from 13 December 2027. Tickets for travel during February 2027 and beyond would be sold by SJ, with RDC continuing to supply carriages and Vectron locomotives rented from Railpool.

The timetable for trains after 13 December 2026 planned to add an additional stop at Copenhagen South railway station, and switching to Hamburg-Altona station on Wednesdays. For the winter period after 8 January 2027, one round-trip per week would go to Berlin, plus two round-trips to Hamburg. The increase in train length and reduction in service frequency were intended to help profitability:

We are very good at selling train tickets, … More than half of all those traveling on the trains are Swedes, so having an effective sales organisation in Sweden is crucial for the continued existence of the night train connection. … If we are to achieve profitability in our services, there must be fewer departures when passenger numbers are relatively low; …however, we will be running longer trains than before.

— Christer Litzell, SJ, in Järnvägar.nu (November 2026)

== Gallery ==
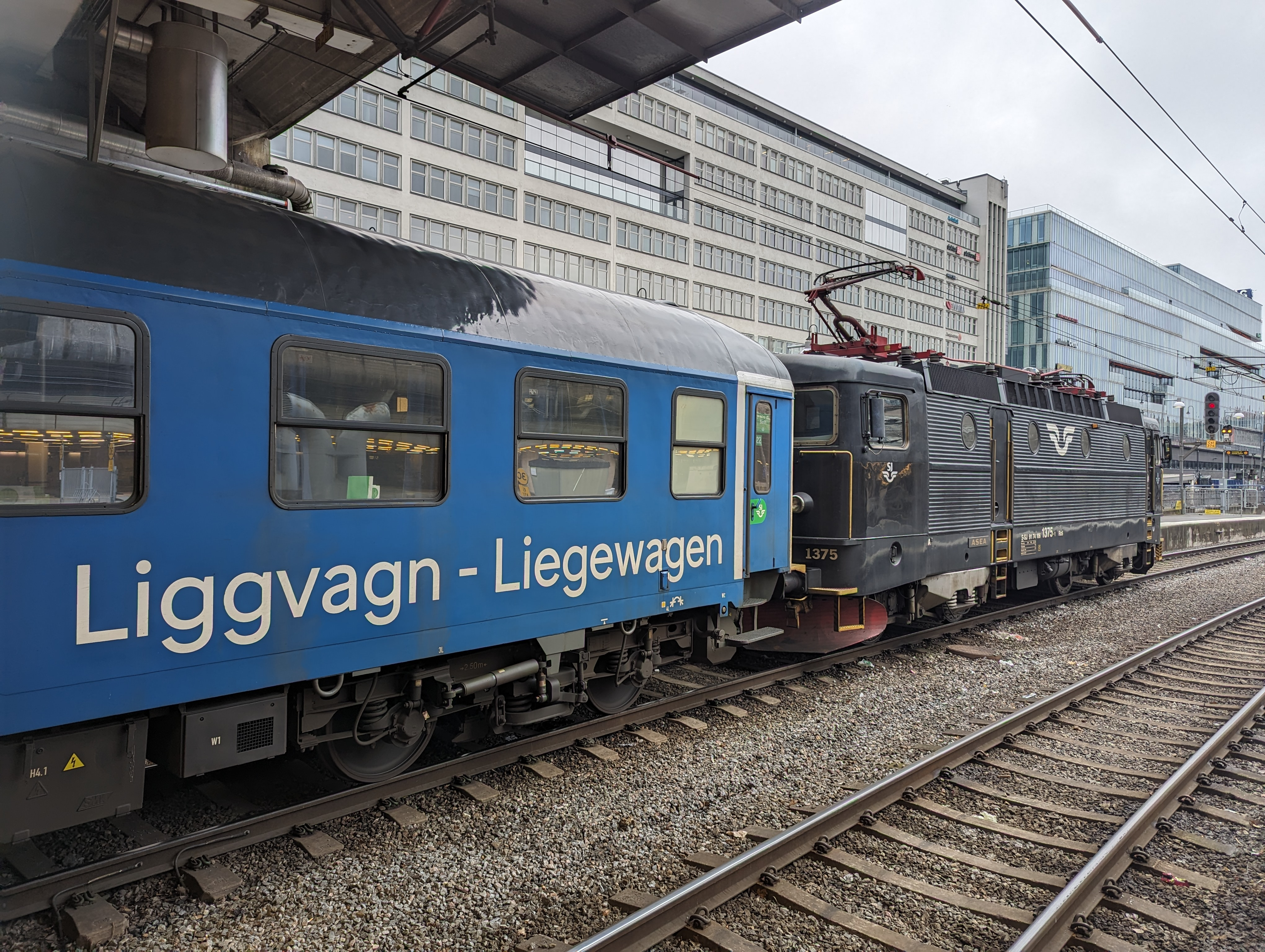
SJ Rc6 locomotive in Stockholm Central

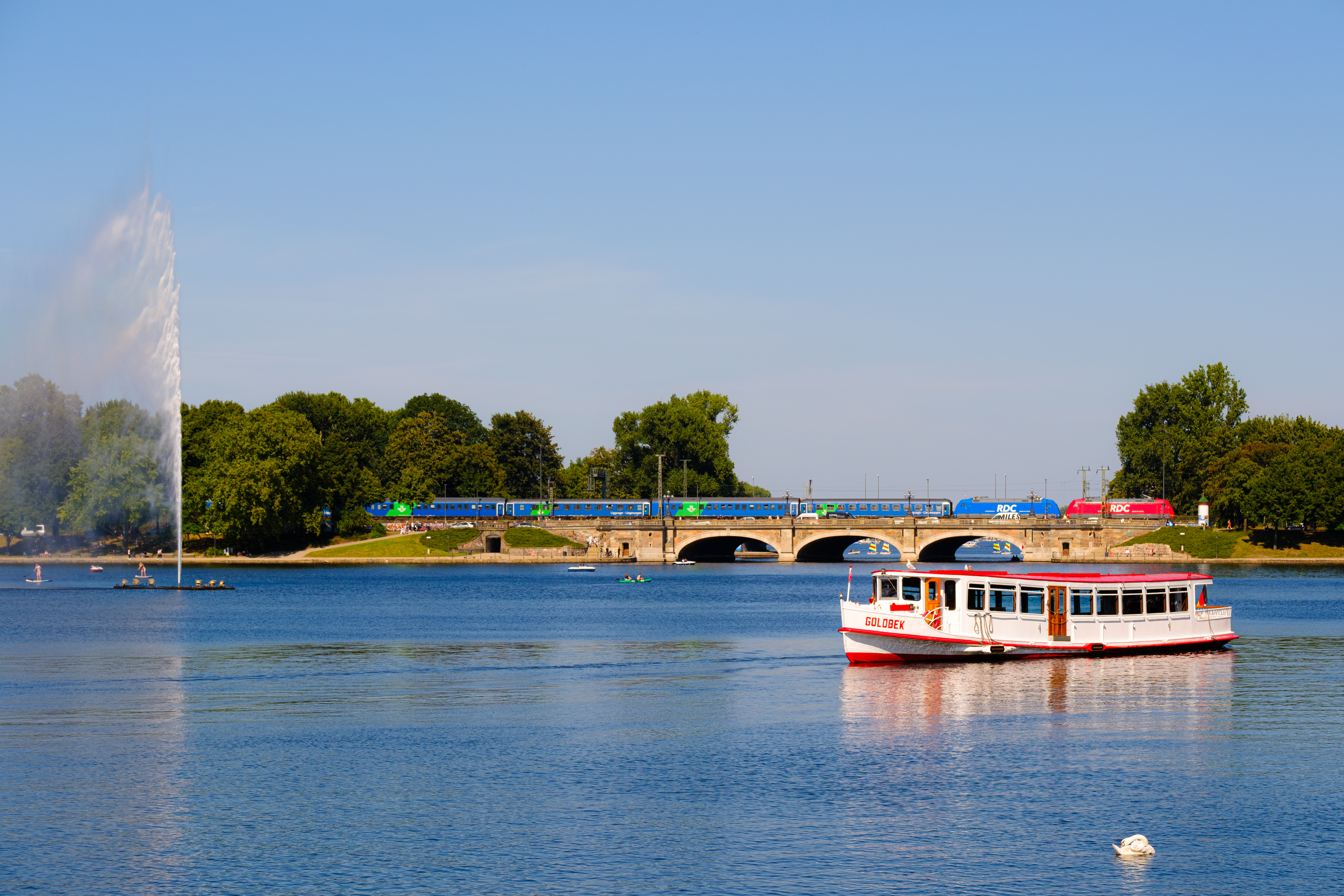
Binnenalster bridge in Hamburg

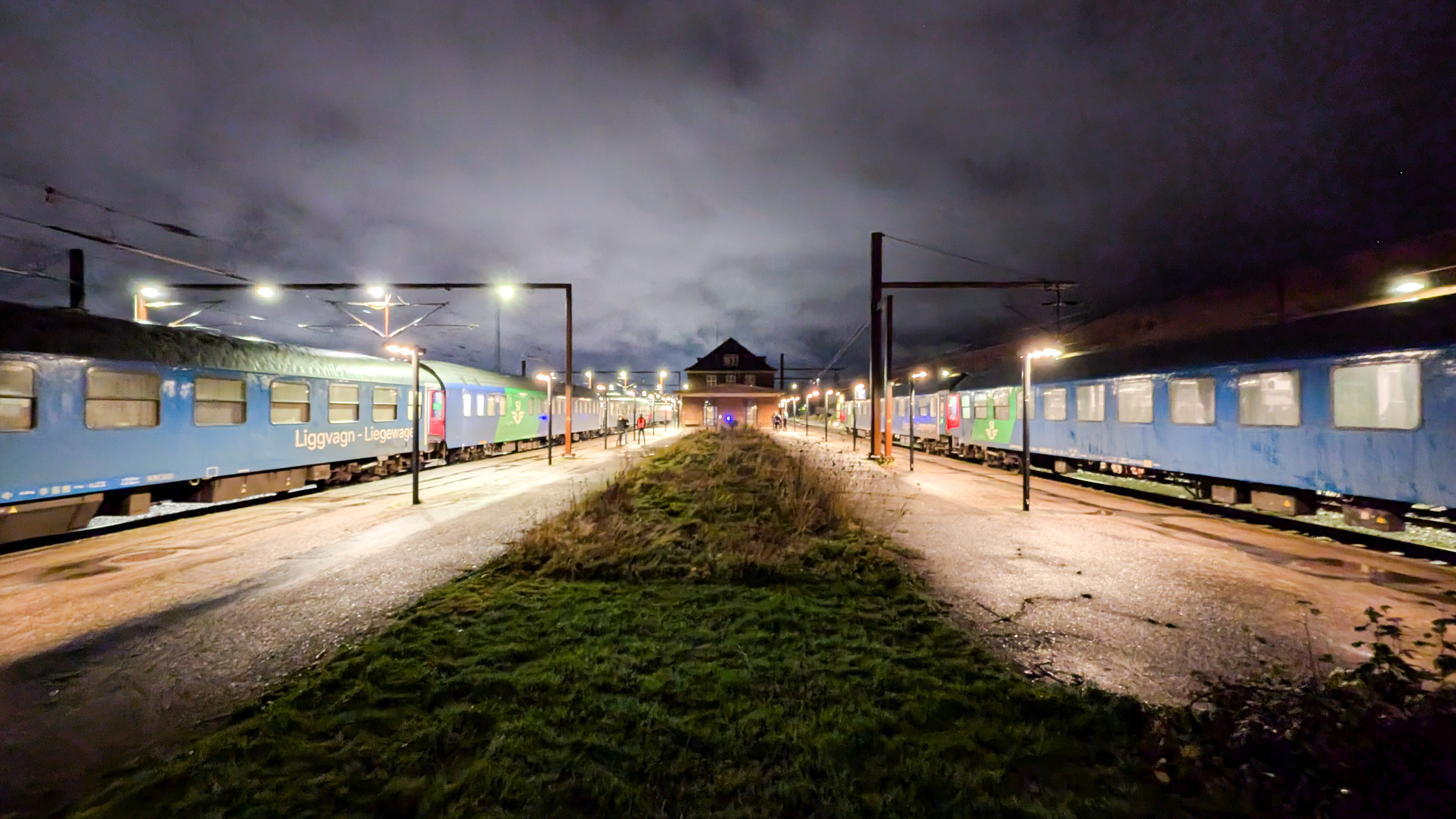
Padborg border station

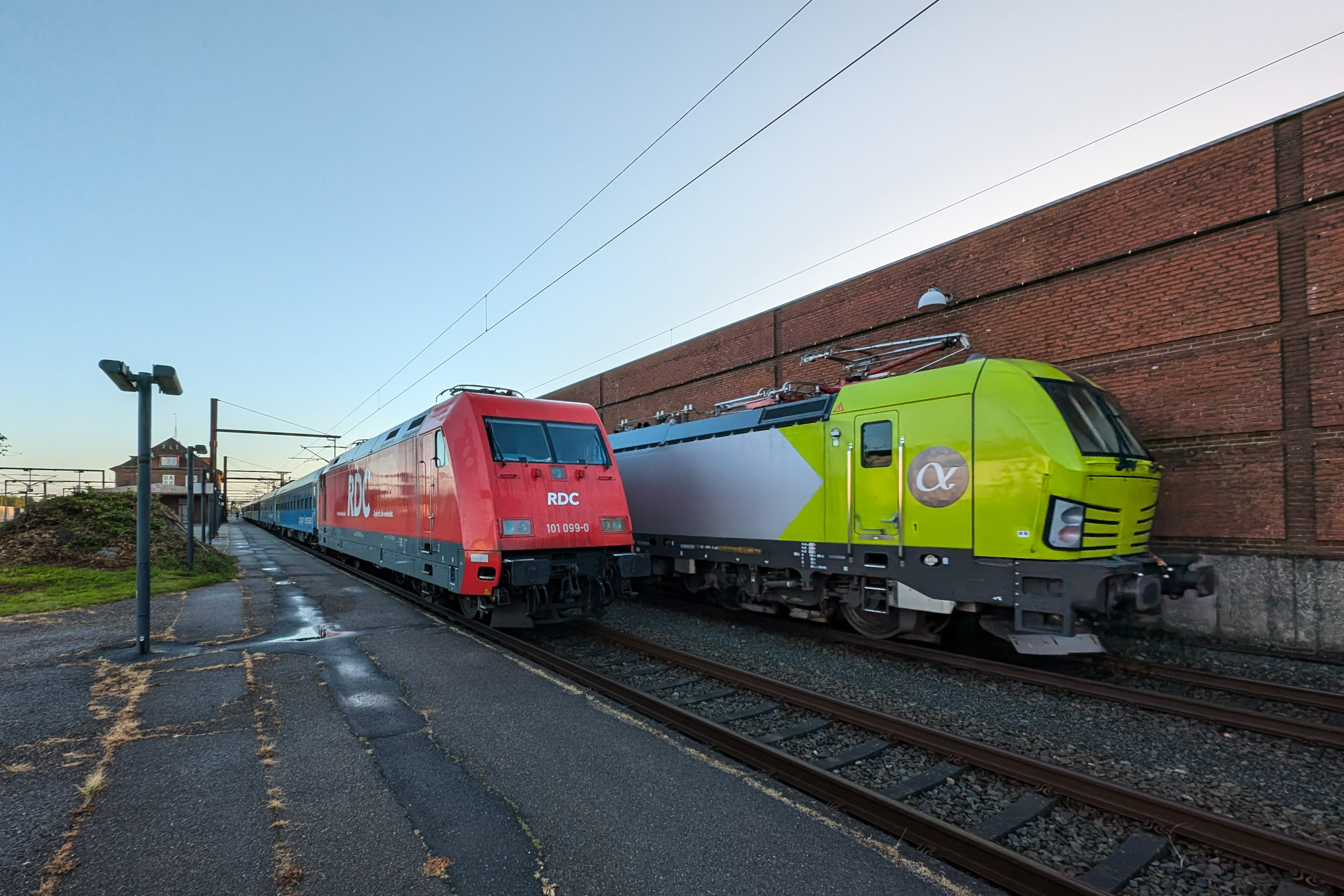
Locomotive change at Padborg

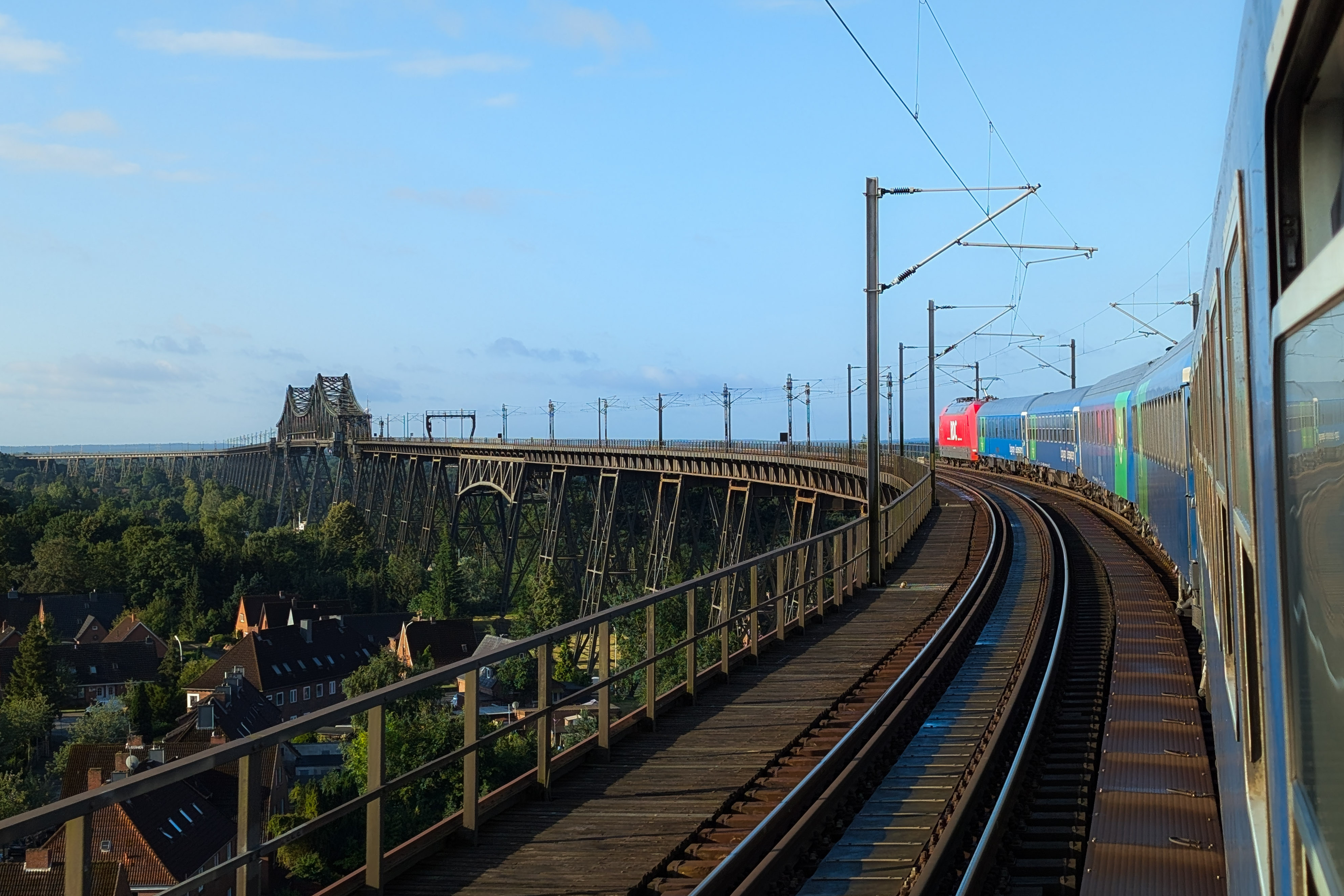
Rendsburg High Bridge
