= Åre railway station =

Railway station in Sweden

Åre
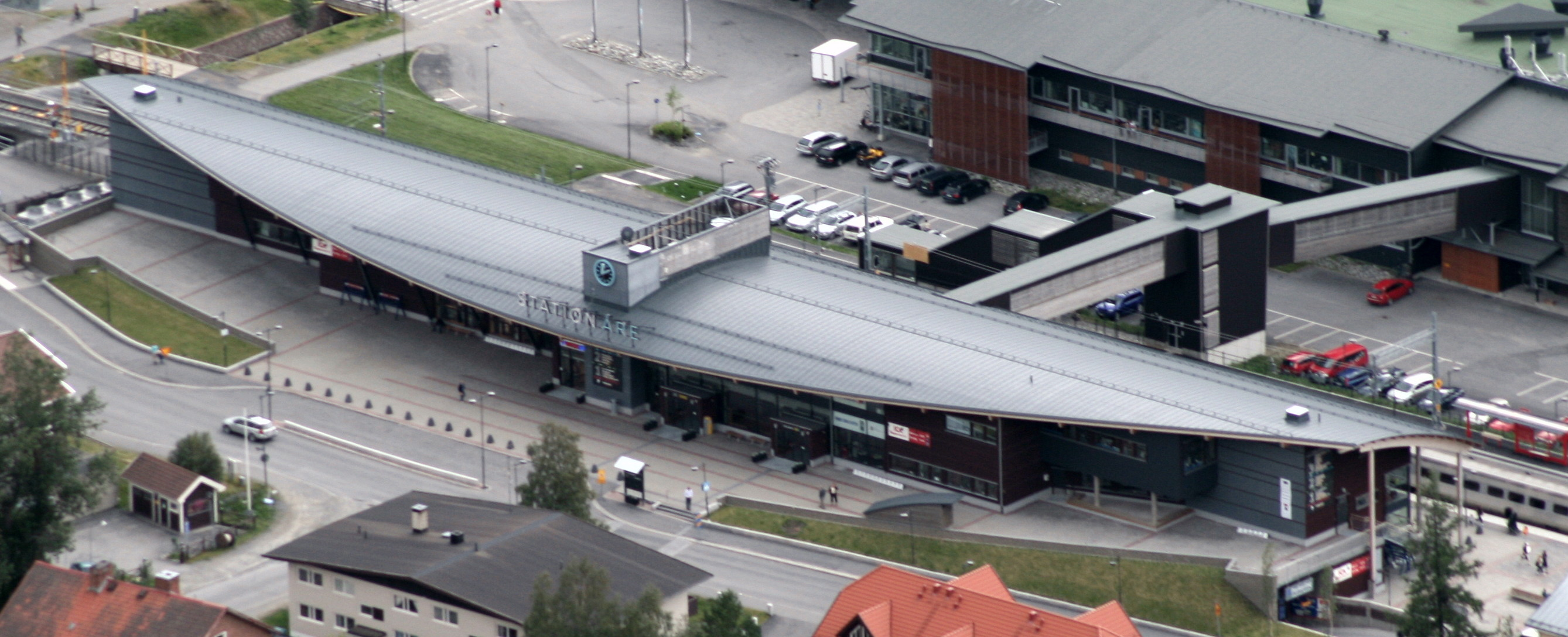

General information
- Location: Åre, Åre Municipality; Sweden
- Coordinates: 63°23′55″N 13°04′35″E
- Elevation: 378 m (1,240 ft)
- Owner: Jernhusen
- Operator: Trafikverket
- Line: Mittbanan
- Distance: 691.594 km (Stockholm C)

Construction
- Architect: Adolf W. Edelsvärd (1881 building)

Other information
- Station code: Åre

History
- Opened: 1881
- Rebuilt: 2006 (new station building)

Services
Preceding station	Norrtåg	Following station
Duved towards Storlien	Central Line	Undersåker towards Sundsvall C
Preceding station	SJ	Following station
Duved Terminus	Northern Main Line	Undersåker towards Stockholm C
Duved Terminus	Gothenburg-Umeå-Duved	Undersåker towards Göteborg C
Preceding station	Long distance trains	Following station
Duved towards Storlien	Snälltåget	Undersåker towards Malmö Central
Location

Åre railway station is a railway station located at Åre in Åre Municipality, Sweden on the Mittbanan railway. The first station building was opened in 1881 and designed by Adolf W. Edelsvärd. In 2006 a new station building was opened some hundred metres east of the old, just months before the FIS Alpine World Ski Championships 2007 started.
