= Alvesta railway station =

Railway station in Alvesta, Sweden

Alvesta
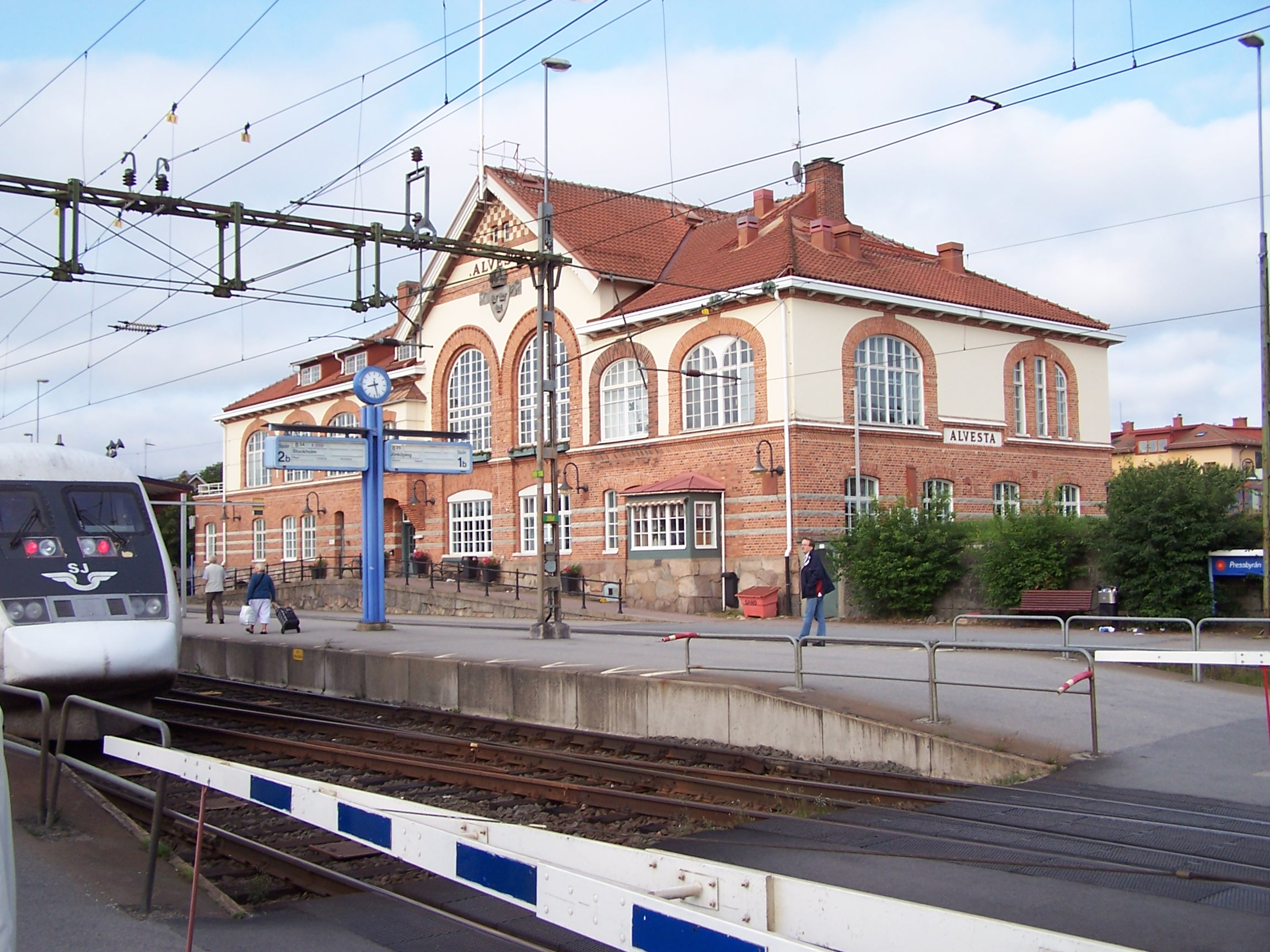
- X2000 at Alvesta Station 2005

General information
- Location: Centralplan 3; 342 30 Alvesta; Sweden
- Coordinates: 56°53′56″N 14°33′25″E
- Owner: Jernhusen (station infrastructure); Trafikverket (rail infrastructure)
- Line: Malmö-Katrineholm
- Platforms: 3
- Tracks: 4
- Train operators: SJ

History
- Opened: 1909; 117 years ago

Services
Preceding station	SJ	Following station
Nässjö C towards Stockholm C	Southern Main Line	Älmhult towards Köpenhamn H
Nässjö C towards Stockholm C	EuroNight	Hässleholm towards Hamburg Hbf or Berlin Hbf
Växjö towards Kalmar	Coast-to-Coast Line	Värnamo towards Göteborg C
Preceding station	Long distance trains	Following station
Nässjö C towards Stockholm C	Snälltåget	Hässleholm towards Malmö C
Nässjö C towards Stockholm C	Snälltåget seasonal	Hässleholm towards Berlin Hbf
Nässjö C towards Duved	Snälltåget seasonal	Hässleholm towards Malmö C
Preceding station	Øresundståg	Following station
Växjö towards Kalmar	Copenhagen–Kalmar Øresundståg	Älmhult towards Østerport
Preceding station	Regional trains	Following station
Gemla towards Växjö	Krösatågen	Rydaholm towards Jönköping Central
Gemla towards Växjö	Krösatågen	Moheda towards Nässjö C
Gemla towards Växjö	Krösatågen	Vislanda towards Hässleholm
Location

Alvesta railway station is a railway station in Alvesta, Kronoberg County. The station was inaugurated in 1909 and is one of the main railway transit stations in Sweden, binding together the Southern Main Line between Malmö and Katrineholm with the Coast-to-Coast Line between Gothenburg and Kalmar/Karlskrona.

== See also ==
- Rail transport in Sweden
