= Norrköping Central Station =

Railway station in Norrköping, Sweden

Norrköping C
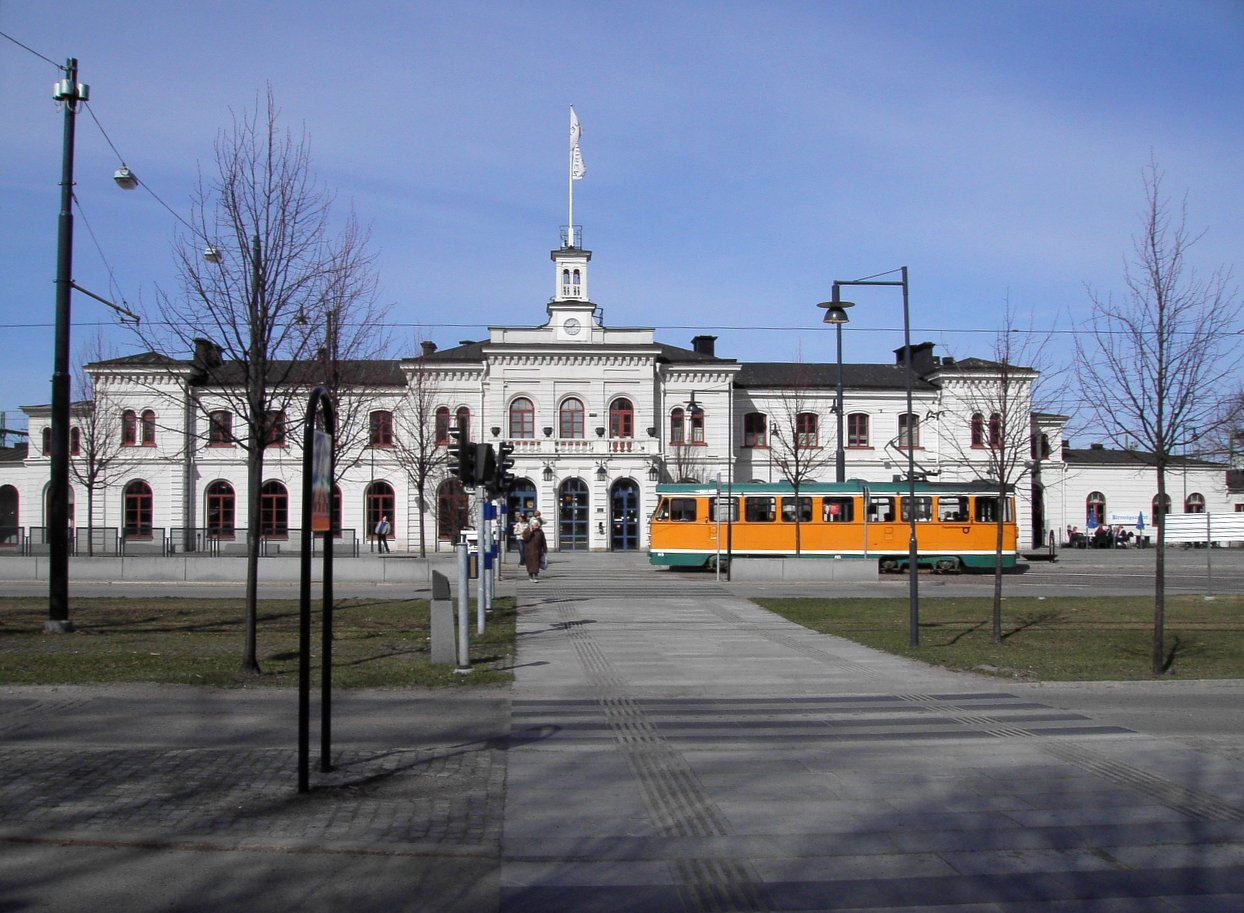

General information
- Location: Norra Promenaden 94; 602 22 Norrköping; Sweden
- Coordinates: 58°35′47″N 16°11′01″E
- Elevation: 3 m (9.8 ft)
- Owner: Jernhusen (station infrastructure); Trafikverket (rail infrastructure)
- Operator: SJ
- Line: Malmö-Katrineholm
- Platforms: 3
- Tracks: 5

History
- Opened: 2 July 1866; 160 years ago

Services
Preceding station	SJ	Following station
Södertälje syd towards Stockholm C	Southern Main Line	Linköping C towards Köpenhamn H
Södertälje syd towards Gävle C	Gävle–Linköping	Linköping C Terminus
Stockholm C Terminus	EuroNight	Linköping C towards Hamburg Hbf or Berlin Hbf
Preceding station	Long distance trains	Following station
Södertälje syd towards Stockholm C	Snälltåget	Linköping C towards Malmö C
Södertälje syd towards Stockholm C	Snälltåget seasonal	Linköping C towards Berlin Hbf
Stockholm C towards Duved	Snälltåget seasonal	Linköping C towards Malmö C
Preceding station	Regional trains	Following station
Kolmården towards Stockholm C	Mälartåg	Terminus
Katrineholm towards Uppsala C	Mälartåg	Linköping C Terminus
Terminus	Östgötatrafiken	Kimstad towards Motala
Terminus	Östgötatrafiken	Kimstad towards Tranås
Location

Norrköping Central Station (Swedish: Norrköpings centralstation) is a railway station located at Norrköping in Norrköping Municipality, Sweden. It is located on the Southern Main Line, which runs from Katrineholm to Malmö.

The station, then known as Norra Jernvägsstation, was designed by architect Adolf W. Edelsvärd and inaugurated on 2 July 1866.
