= Linköping Central Station =

Railway station in Linköping, Sweden

Linköping C
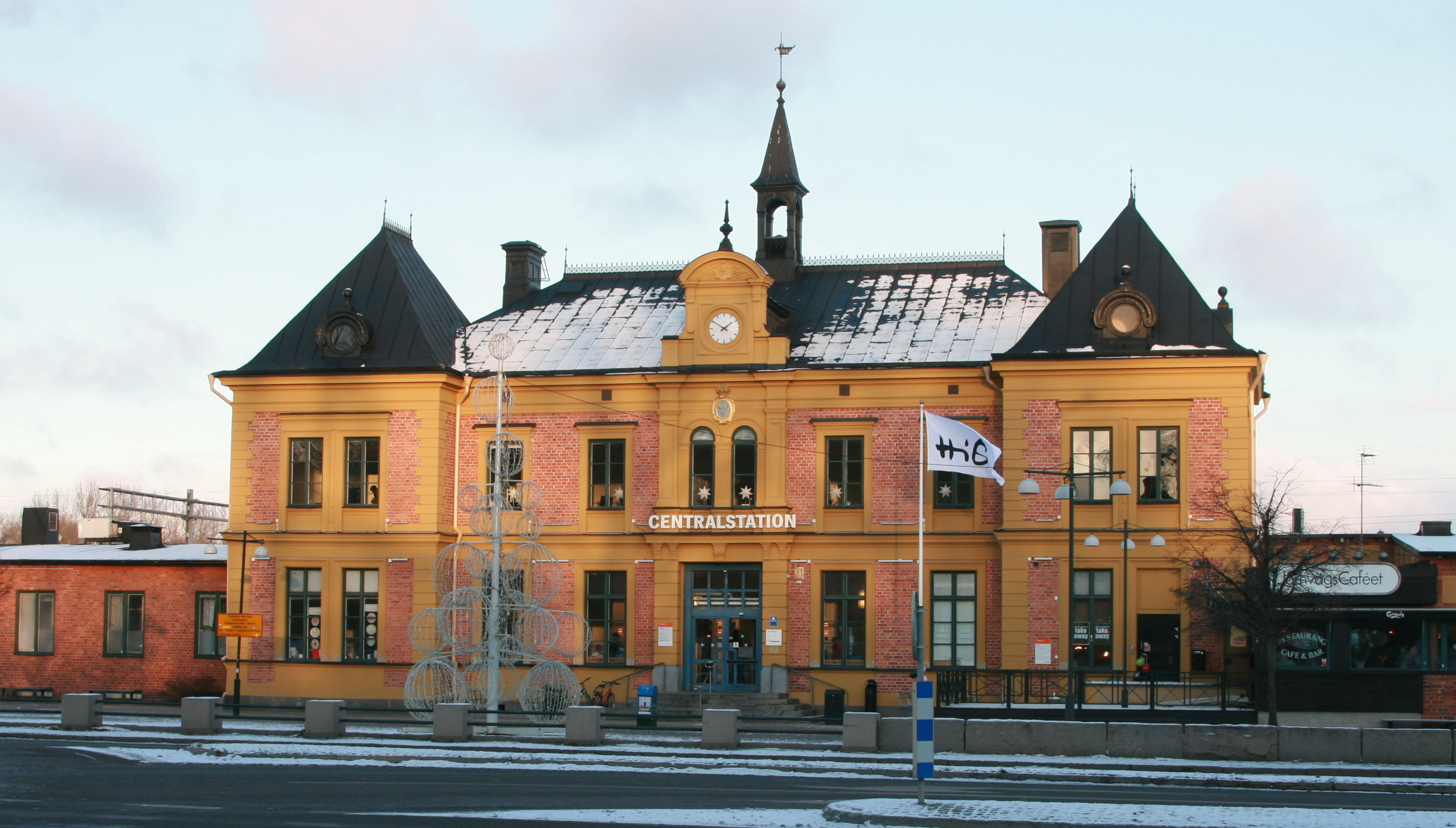

General information
- Location: Järnvägsgatan 3; 582 22 Linköping; Sweden
- Coordinates: 58°24′58″N 15°37′36″E
- Elevation: 40 m (130 ft)
- Owner: Jernhusen (station infrastructure); Trafikverket (rail infrastructure)
- Operator: SJ
- Line: Malmö-Katrineholm
- Platforms: 3
- Tracks: 5

History
- Opened: 1872; 154 years ago

Services
Preceding station	SJ	Following station
Norrköping C towards Stockholm C	Southern Main Line	Nässjö C towards Köpenhamn H
Norrköping C towards Gävle C	Gävle–Linköping	Terminus
Norrköping C towards Stockholm C	EuroNight	Nässjö C towards Hamburg Hbf or Berlin Hbf
Preceding station	Long distance trains	Following station
Norrköping C towards Stockholm C	Snälltåget	Nässjö C towards Malmö C
Norrköping C towards Stockholm C	Snälltåget seasonal	Nässjö C towards Berlin Hbf
Norrköping C towards Duved	Snälltåget seasonal	Nässjö C towards Malmö C
Preceding station	Regional trains	Following station
Norrköping C towards Uppsala C	Mälartåg	Terminus
Terminus	Krösatågen	Tannefors towards Västervik
Terminus	Krösatågen	Tannefors towards Kalmar C
Linghem towards Norrköping C	Östgötatrafiken	Vikingstad towards Motala
Linghem towards Norrköping C	Östgötatrafiken	Vikingstad towards Tranås
Location

Linköping Central Station is a railway station located at Linköping in Linköping Municipality, Sweden. It is located on the Södra stambanan, which runs from Katrineholm to Malmö.

== History ==
The station was constructed between 1871 and 1872 and was designed by the architect Adolf W. Edelsvärd. The architecture of the station was inspired by the Renaissance Revival architecture. It has two floors with windows, symmetric design, red and yellow colors.

The station is situated on the Southern Main Line passing by Katrineholm. Linköping railway station is located in the northern eastern part of the city.

== Gallery ==
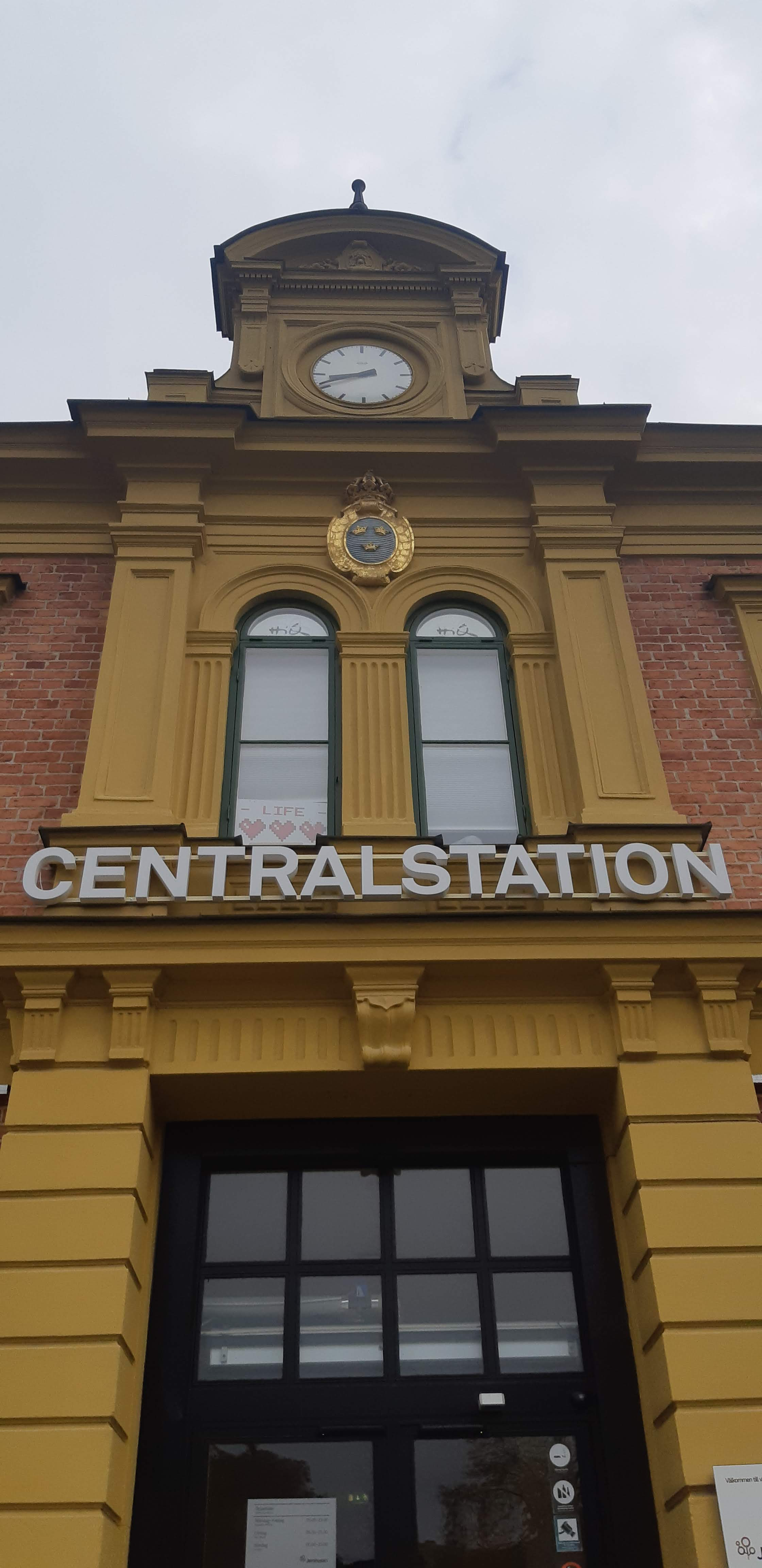
Entrance to the station with yellow and red colors.

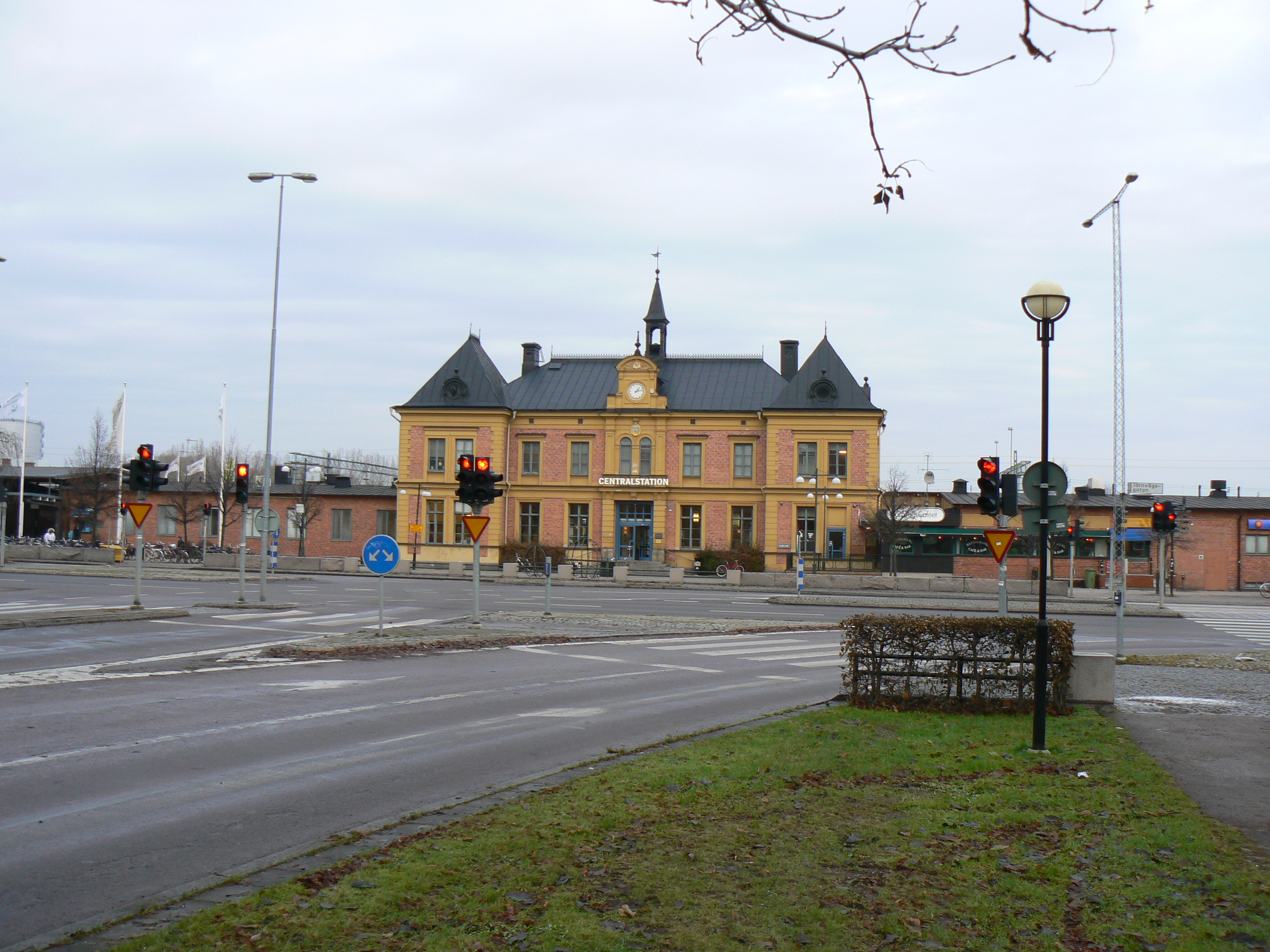
Main building of the station.
