= Nässjö railway station =

Railway station in Nässjö, Sweden

Nässjö railway station Nässjö station
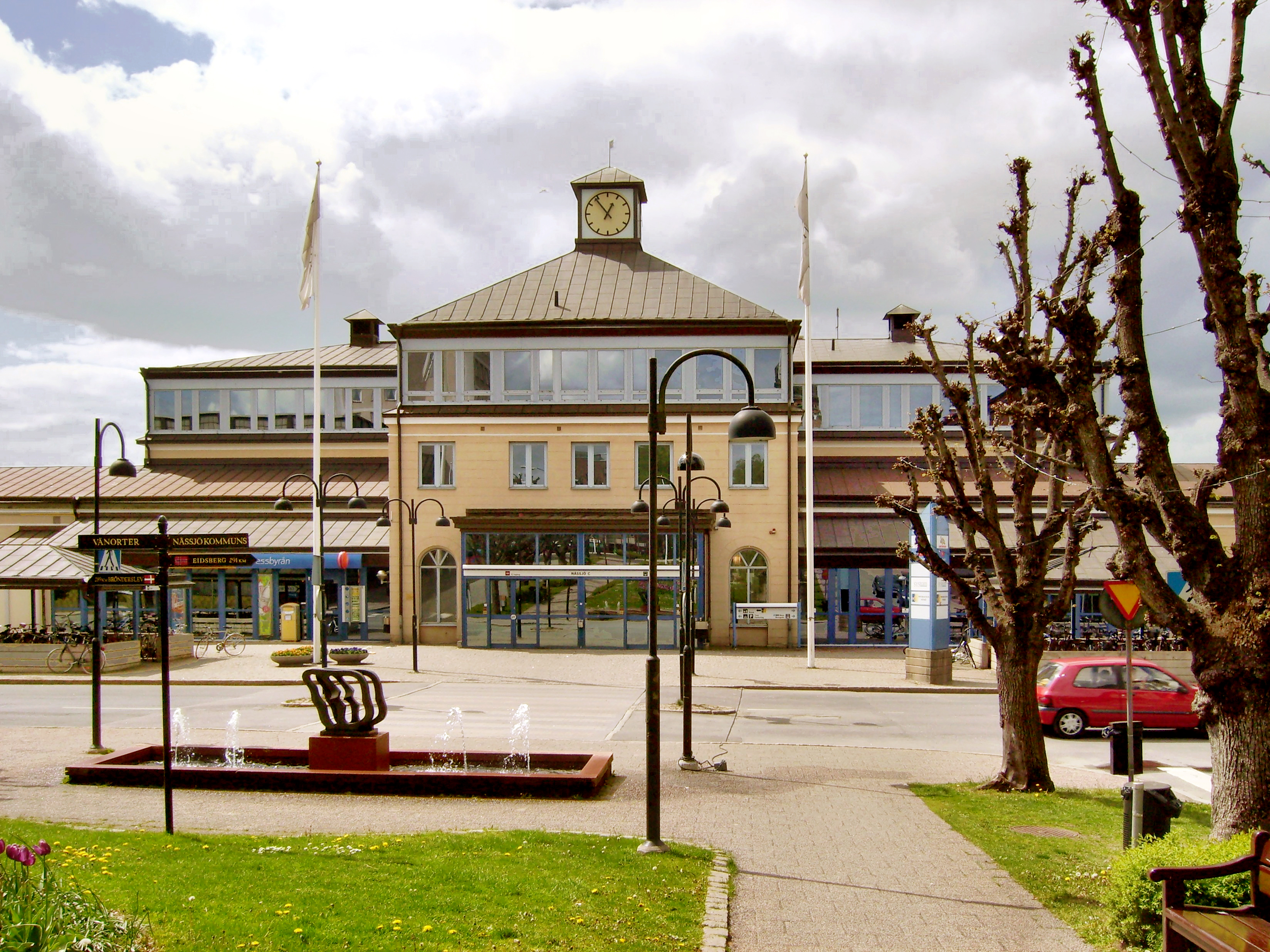
- Station building

General information
- Other names: Nässjö central station
- Location: Jönköping County; Sweden
- Coordinates: 57°39′8″N 14°41′40″E
- Elevation: 295 metres (968 ft)
- Owner: Jernhusen
- Transit authority: Jönköpings länstrafik
- Lines: Southern Main Line; Jönköping Line; Halmstad-Nässjö railway line Nässjö–Vetlanda Railway; Nässjö–Hultsfred Railway
- Tracks: 9

Construction
- Accessible: yes
- Architect: Adolf W. Edelsvärd

Other information
- Station code: N

History
- Opened: 1864

Services
Preceding station	SJ	Following station
Linköping C towards Stockholm C	Southern Main Line	Alvesta towards Köpenhamn H
Linköping C towards Stockholm C	EuroNight	Alvesta towards Hamburg Hbf or Berlin Hbf
Preceding station	Long distance trains	Following station
Linköping Central towards Stockholm Central	Snälltåget	Alvesta towards Malmö Central
Linköping Central towards Stockholm Central	Snälltåget seasonal	Alvesta towards Berlin Hbf
Linköping Central towards Duved	Snälltåget seasonal	Alvesta towards Malmö Central
Preceding station	Regional trains	Following station
Aneby towards Tranås	Krösatågen	Terminus
Forserum towards Jönköping	Krösatågen	Terminus
Malmbäck towards Halmstad	Krösatågen	Terminus
Terminus	Krösatågen	Brinellskolan towards Eksjö
Terminus	Krösatågen	Stensjön towards Vetlanda
Terminus	Krösatågen	Bodafors towards Växjö
Preceding station	Västtågen	Following station
Forserum towards Göteborg C	Gothenburg-Nässjö Line	Terminus
Forserum towards Skövde C	Gothenburg-Nässjö Line	Terminus

Other services
Bus
Location

Nässjö railway station is located in the city of Nässjö, Sweden, along the Southern Main Line. It is an important junction with railways in six directions, the two on the mainline and four other. The station is located around 100 metres (330 ft) from the traditional midpoint of the city. City buses and regional buses stop nearby.

Railway traffic started in 1864. The station building has been added to a few times. Nässjö is a railway town and the present midtown was a small rural village before the railway construction.
