= Hässleholm railway station =

Railway station in Hässleholm, Sweden

Hässleholm
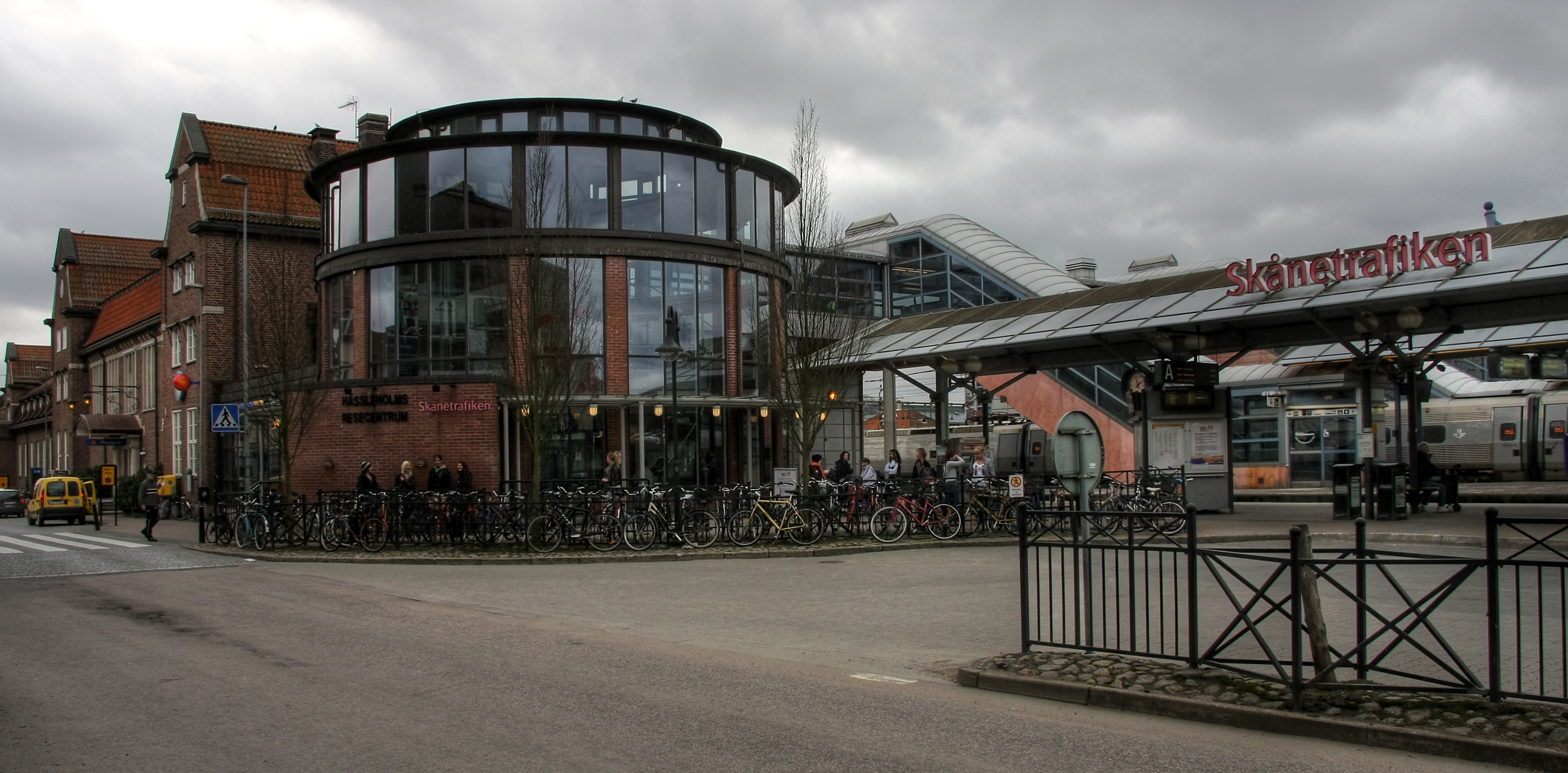
- Station building

General information
- Location: Hässleholm Municipality; Sweden
- Coordinates: 56°9′29″N 13°45′48″E
- Elevation: 52 m (171 ft)
- Owner: Jernhusen (station infrastructure); Trafikverket (rail infrastructure)
- Lines: Malmö-Katrineholm; Hässleholm-Helsingborg
- Platforms: 3
- Tracks: 6
- Train operators: SJ

History
- Opened: 1860; 166 years ago

Services
Preceding station	SJ	Following station
Älmhult towards Stockholm C	Southern Main Line	Lund C towards Köpenhamn H
Alvesta towards Stockholm C	EuroNight	Lund C towards Hamburg Hbf or Berlin Hbf
Preceding station	Long distance trains	Following station
Alvesta towards Stockholm C	Snälltåget	Lund C towards Malmö C
Alvesta towards Stockholm C	Snälltåget seasonal	Lund C towards Berlin Hbf
Alvesta towards Duved	Snälltåget seasonal	Lund C towards Malmö C
Preceding station	Øresundståg	Following station
Höör towards Østerport	Copenhagen–Kalmar Øresundståg	Osby towards Kalmar C
Lund towards Østerport	Copenhagen–Karlskrona Øresundståg	Kristianstad towards Karlskrona C
Preceding station	Regional trains	Following station
Terminus	Krösatågen	Ballingslöv towards Växjö
Preceding station	Pågatågen	Following station
Sösdala towards Hyllie	Line 4	Vinslöv towards Kristianstad C
Tyringe towards Helsingborg C	Line 5	Vinslöv towards Kristianstad C
Bjärnum towards Markaryd	Line 7	Terminus
Location

Hässleholm railway station is located in the city of Hässleholm, Sweden, along the Southern Main Line. Railway traffic started in 1860. The first proper station building was opened in 1863, although it over the years got too small. The station building in brick was built in 1921. City buses and regional buses stop nearby. Hässleholm is a railway town and the present midtown was a pure rural area before the railway construction. The station is located around 100 metres (330 ft) from the traditional midpoint of the city.
