= Railway node =

Railway connection

A railway node is a location in a railway network where various routes intersect due to the presence of infrastructure or operational features. These features can range from simple junctions or crossings of rail routes, to stations, all the way to large nodes that span many switches and operational links. These links can also include connections to other modes of transport such as road, sea, or air. The function of the node is to maintain the flow of traffic by routing from the various connecting routes as quickly and efficiently as possible.
