= Adolf W. Edelsvärd =

Swedish architect, engineer and military officer

Adolf Wilhelm Edelsvärd
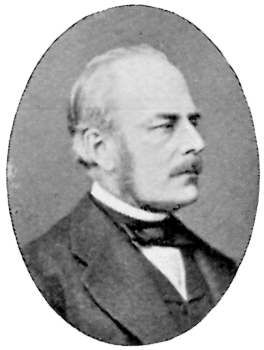
- Born: 28 June 1824; Östersund, Sweden
- Died: 15 October 1919 (aged 95); Stockholm, Sweden
- Occupation: Architect

Adolf Wilhelm Edelsvärd (28 June 1824 – 15 October 1919) was a Swedish architect, engineer and military officer.

== Biography ==
Edelsvärd was born at Östersund in Jämtland, Sweden. His father, Fredrik Wilhelm Edelsvärd, was a military officer and engineer. He studied civil architecture, both in Sweden and in England. He was promoted to lieutenant in the Dalarna Regiment in 1844. He served as head architect for the Swedish National Railways (Statens Järnvägar) from 1855 to 1895.

His designs included the Gothenburg Central Station (1856), Norrköping Central station (1865), Uppsala Central station (1865), Stockholm Central Station (1869) and Malmö Central station (1890). He also designed the exhibition hall in Kungsträdgården for the General Industrial Exposition of Stockholm (1866).

For smaller stations the station designs were often copied from another station he designed, creating an around a dozen standard types. Some important node stations were placed on the countryside, and there he designed small cities with the station surrounded by a church, a town hall, a hotel, homes for the work force etc.; for example Katrineholm, Nässjö and Hässleholm.

== Gallery ==
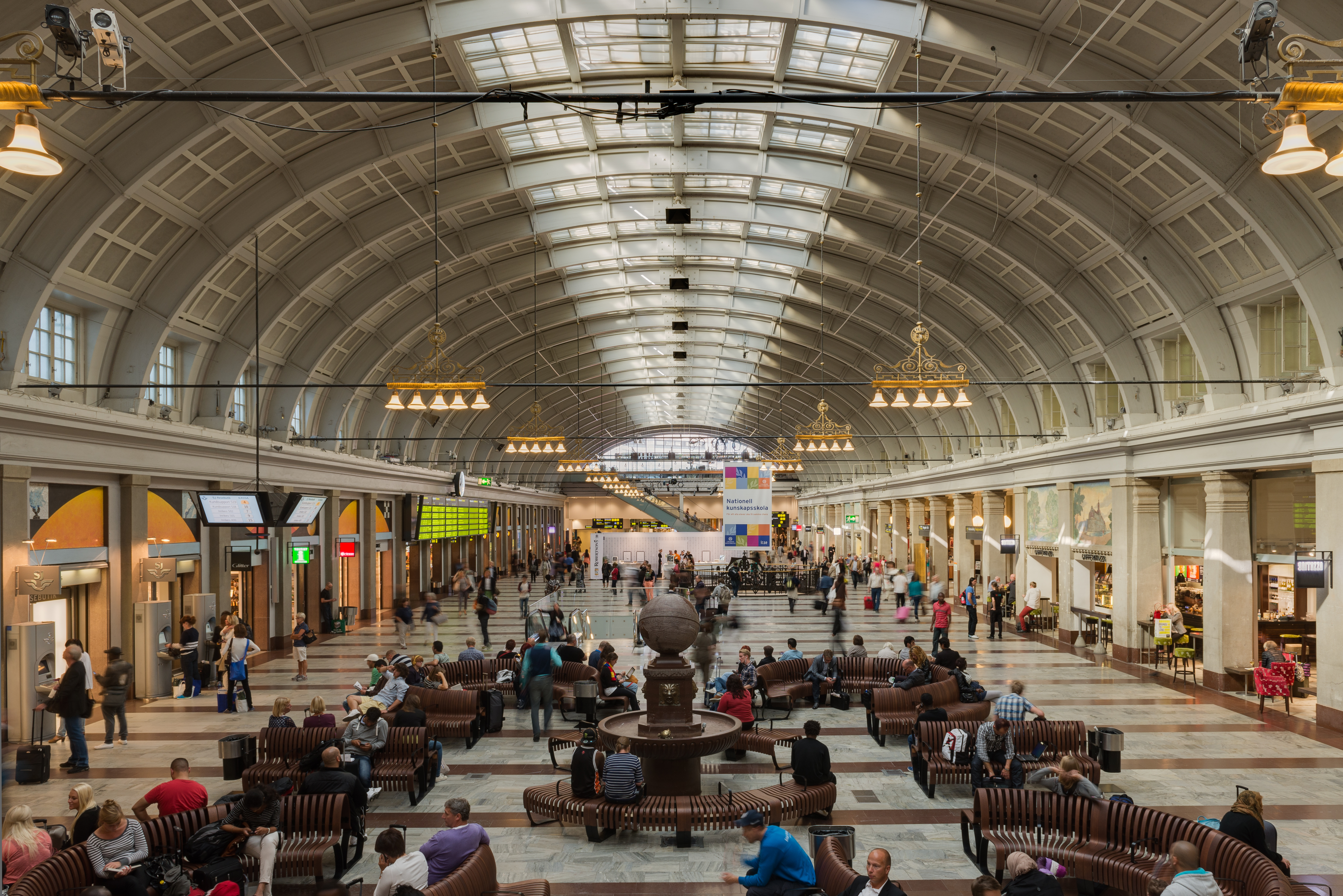
Stockholm Central Station

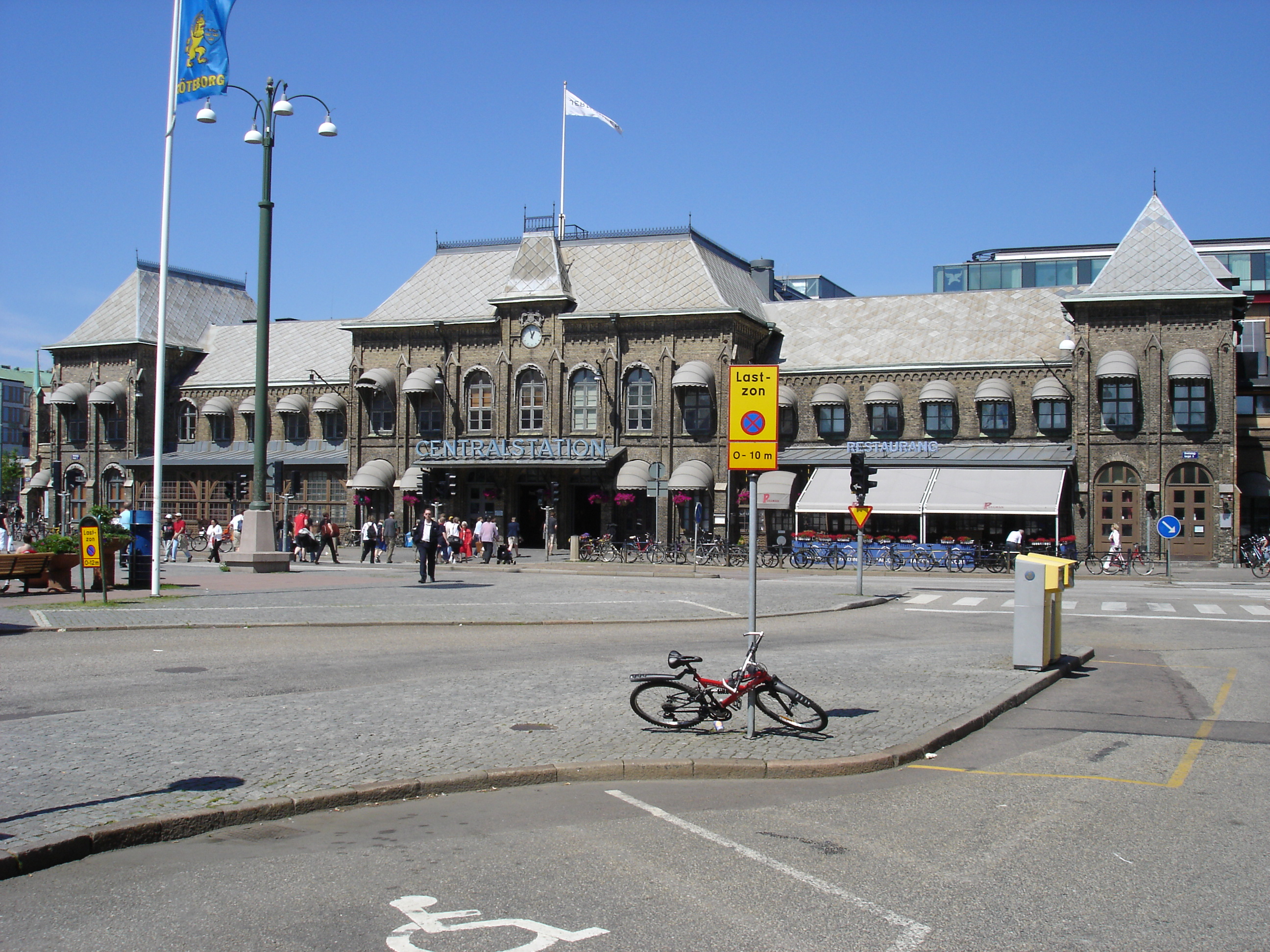
Gothenburg Central Station

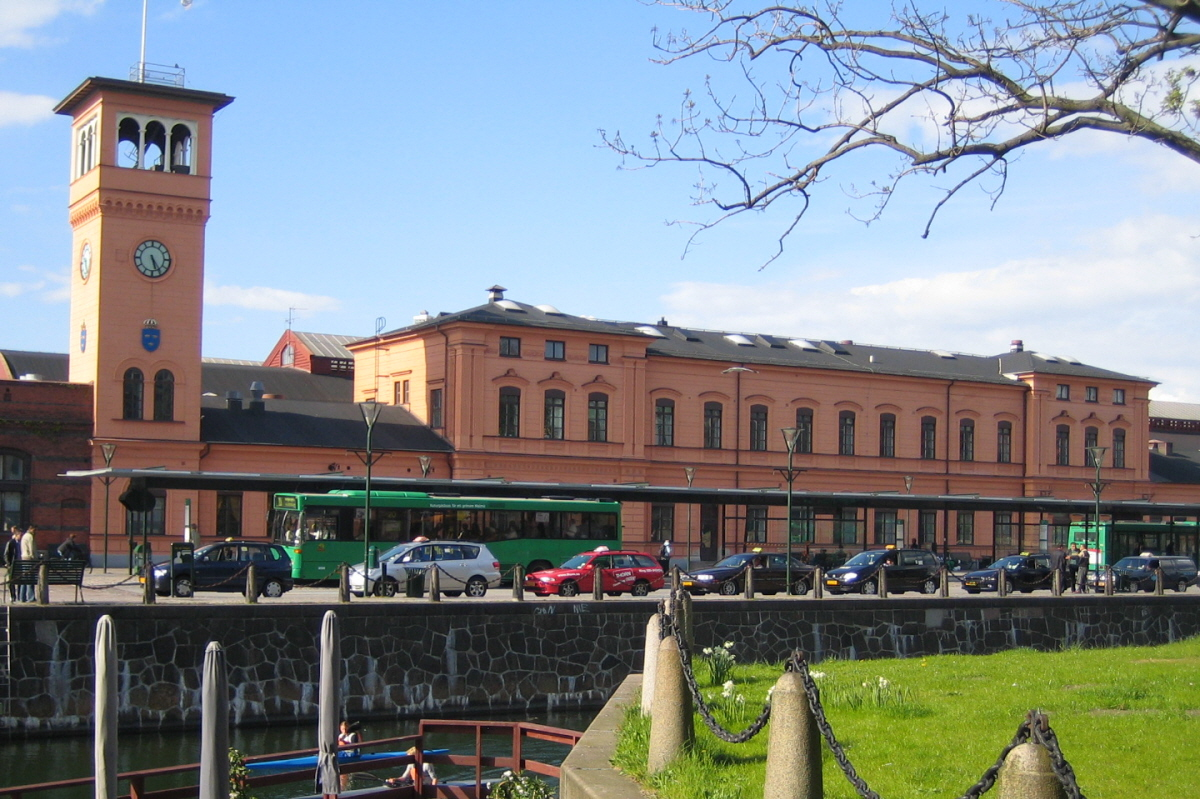
Malmö Central Station
