= Southern Main Line =

Railway line in Sweden

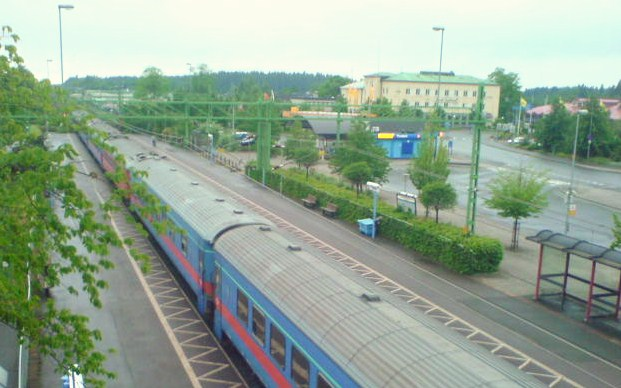
- Train departure from Sävsjö in direction versus Stockholm and view over Sävsjö's central parts

Overview
- Owner: Swedish state
- Termini: Malmö; Katrineholm

History
- Opened: 1874

Technical
- Operating speed: 200 km/h (125 mph)

The Southern Main Line (Swedish: Södra stambanan) is a 483-kilometre (300 mi) long standard gauge electrified railway between Malmö and Katrineholm in Sweden. The trains continue further on to Stockholm Central Station along the Western Main Line and terminate there (at platforms 16–19). The line also connects to other lines, most notably in Malmö to the Öresund line towards Copenhagen, and in Lund to the West Coast Line towards Gothenburg.

== History ==
The first parts of the line opened in 1856 between Malmö and Lund, and the last parts in 1874. An unusual route was chosen as the line passed far from many of the bigger towns at the time, such as Hörby and Kristianstad. This was an attempt to "colonize" the countryside and populate it. Another strategic choice was to put it far from the coast to minimize vulnerability to military attacks. A number of new towns sprung up or grew as the line brought access to the area, such as Eslöv and Hässleholm.

Initially the route Katrineholm–Nässjö was called Eastern Main Line, whereas the original definition of Southern Main Line was kept and thus reserved for Malmö–Nässjö–Falköping. Not until 1990, the newly founded railway authority Banverket changed the official definition according to modern use. (Nässjö–Falköping became known as Jönköping Line.)

== Present ==
The line entirely consists of at least double track, with four tracks on the section Malmö–Lund. Today higher-speed X 2000 trains travel at 200 km/h (125 mph) for large parts of the way.

== Stations ==
This is a list of stations along the line where the long-distance trains stop:

- Katrineholm
- Norrköping
- Linköping
- Mjölby
- Tranås
- Nässjö
- Alvesta
- Älmhult
- Hässleholm
- Lund
- Malmö

Here is a list of all the stations along the line:

- Katrineholm
- Norrköping
- Kimstad
- Linghem
- Linköping
- Mantorp
- Mjölby
- Tranås
- Aneby
- Nässjö
- Bodafors
- Sävsjö
- Stockaryd
- Lammhult
- Moheda
- Alvesta
- Vislanda
- Diö
- Älmhult
- Killeberg
- Osby
- Ballingslöv
- Hässleholm
- Sösdala
- Tjörnarp
- Höör
- Stehag
- Eslöv
- Örtofta
- Stångby
- Lund
- Klostergården
- Hjärup
- Åkarp
- Burlöv
- Malmö

== Future ==
A new high speed railway, known as The East Link (Swedish: Ostlänken) is currently being built between Järna, south of Södertälje, and Linköping. The 160 kilometer double tracked railway will have a maximum speed of 250 kilometres per hour (155 mph). This will both increase capacity for trains between Malmö and Stockholm, while also reducing the travel time.

The Swedish Transport Administration is as of 2026 planning to build two new high speed train tracks between Lund and Hässleholm, to increase capacity for passenger and freight traffic. The new tracks will have a maximum speed of 250 kilometres per hour (155 mph). Construction is not set to begin until at least 2034.
