= List of ski areas in Austria =

These are tables of ski resorts in Austria, sorted by province.

As a country dominated by the Alps, Austria offers many opportunities for alpine skiing. Alpine skiing is a major driver of tourism in Austria, and therefore an important economic factor.

In particular, the provinces of Vorarlberg, Tyrol and Salzburg offer one or more ski resorts in almost every Alpine valley, equipped with numerous lifts (cable cars, chair lifts, T-bar lifts). The large ski areas in the Austrian Alps have 50 or more different lifts and sometimes more than 100 km of groomed slopes. However, these are often not connected and can only be reached by bus. The Ski amadé network in the province of Salzburg, for example, has 860 kilometres of pistes and 270 lifts, but they are spread over 25 villages in an area of several hundred square kilometres.

However, there are also many ski resorts in the eastern provinces. The smallest of these often have only one or two T-bar lifts and a few hundred metres of pistes.

Ski resorts are often combined with other winter sports facilities, such as cross-country trails, toboggan runs or thermal spas.

There are also some glacier ski resorts in Austria, which essentially offer year-round winter sports regardless of snow conditions.

Some of Austria's ski resorts repeatedly host World Cup races.

== Ski areas in Austria's provinces ==
Some of the data presented differs significantly from other sources.

=== Kärnten ===
Name	Village	Sea level in m	Lifts	Pistes in km
Ankogel-Mallnitz	Mallnitz	1287–2636	2/0/4	30
Bad Kleinkirchheim	Bad Kleinkirchheim	1150–2043	4/4/18	95
Dreiländereck Bergbahnen	Arnoldstein	680–1600	0/1/8	17
Emberger Alm	Berg im Drautal	1600–2250	0/0/5	10
Falkert	Falkert	1870–2308	0/0/5	9
Flattnitz	Glödnitz, Metnitz	1400–1800	0/1/2	10
Gerlitzen	Annenheim, Sattendorf	504–1911	1/6/7	26
Gitschtal	Weißbriach	820–1150	0/0/3	4
Goldeck	Spittal an der Drau	556–2142	2/1/5	22
Großglockner Heiligenblut	Heiligenblut	1301–2902	3/1/10	55
Innerkrems-Schönfeld-Karneralm	Kremsbrücke, Ramingstein^{S}	1500–2266	0/2/12	60
Katschberg-Aineck	Rennweg, St. Margarethen im Lungau^{S}	1100–2220	0/6/9	60
Klippitztörl	Klippitztörl	1530–1818	0/2/4	28
Koralpe-Schiregion Süd	St. Stefan im Lavanttal, Wolfsberg	1600–2100	0/1/5	26
Kötschach-Mauthen	Kötschach-Mauthen	700–1400	0/1/3	6
Mölltaler Gletscher	Flattach	2250–3122	2/4/3	50
Nassfeld	Hermagor	1300–2000	5/7/18	101
Petzen	Feistritz ob Bleiburg	600–1700	1/0/4	26
Simonhöhe	St. Urban	750–1340	0/0/8	13
Sirnitz-Hochrindl	Sirnitz	1400–1800	0/1/5	15
Turracher Höhe	Reichenau, Turrach^{St}	1400–2200	0/4/8	33
Verditz-Gerlitzen	Afritz	700–2000	0/3/1	16
Weinebene	St. Gertraud, Deutschlandsberg^{St}	1580–1886	0/0/6	22
Weißensee	Weißensee	930–1324	0/1/4	6

^{S} is in Salzburg
^{St} is in Styria

=== Niederösterreich ===
Name	Village	Sea level in m	Lifts	Pistes in km
Aichelberglifte	Karlstift	936–1054	0/0/2	6
Annaberg	Annaberg	800–1400	0/3/6	15
Arabichl	Kirchberg am Wechsel	1350–1593	0/0/1	4
Arralifte	Harmanschlag	740–850	0/0/3	4
Eibllifte*	Türnitz	560–1007	0/1/3	12
Enne	Schwarzenbach an der Pielach	600–780	0/0/1	0,5
Furtnerlifte	Rohr im Gebirge	800–927	0/0/3	
Gemeindealpe	Mitterbach	800–1626	0/2/1	
Hirschenkogel	Semmering	1000–1340	1/1/1	14
Hochbärneck	Sankt Anton an der Jeßnitz	860–1050	0/0/2	5
Hochkar	Göstling an der Ybbs	1480–1808	0/6/3	18,6
Jauerling	Oberndorf am Jauerling	855–959	0/0/1	1
Königsberg	Hollenstein an der Ybbs	715–1078	0/0/6	12
Losenheim	Puchberg am Schneeberg	577–1222	0/1/1	8
Maiszinken	Lunz am See	790–1030	0/0/2	5
Mönichkirchen-Mariensee	Mönichkirchen	870–1450	0/3/1	13
Ötscherlifte	Lackenhof	810–1510	0/3/5	19
Raxalpe	Reichenau an der Rax	528–1600	1/0/1	3
Sonnwendstein-Maria Schutz**	Schottwien	700–1523	0/1/3	7
Steinberglift	Neusiedl an der Zaya	175–200	0/0/1	1
Unterberg	Pernitz	710–1342	0/0/4	15
Wechsel	St. Corona am Wechsel	840–1420	0/2/2	17

* Until March 2006; subsequently decommissioned due to lack of operating licence

** Until 2005; subsequently decommissioned due to lack of operating licence

=== Oberösterreich ===
Name	Village	Sea level in m	Lifts	Pistes in km
Feuerkogel	Ebensee am Traunsee	443–1625	1/1/5	12
Forsteralm	Gaflenz	720–1100	0/1/6	16
Freistadt	Freistadt	595–685	0/0/1	1
Glasenberg	Maria Neustift	850–971	0/0/1	4
Gosau	Gosau	750–2000	0/1/5	7
Hansberg	Sankt Johann am Wimberg	850–930	0/0/3	1,5
Hinterstoder	Hinterstoder	600–1860	1/3/8	22
Hochficht-Böhmerwald	Klaffer am Hochficht	930–1337	0/2/7	20
Hochlecken	Neukirchen	870–1150	0/0/4	4
Hohe Dirn	Losenstein	800–1200	0/0/5	5
Kasberg	Grünau im Almtal	620–1600	2/1/8	33
Katrinalm	Bad Ischl	470–1415	1/1/0	6
Kirchschlag	Kirchschlag bei Linz	750–900	0/0/3	3
Königswiesen	Königswiesen	614–800	0/0/2	1
Krippenstein-Obertraun	Obertraun	609–2100	3/1/4	13
Pyhrn-Priel	Spital am Pyhrn	650–1870	8	40
Sandl-Viehberg	Sandl	950–1111	0/0/3	3
Sternsteinlifte	Bad Leonfelden	800–1122	0/1/1	4
Wurzeralm	Spital am Pyhrn	800–1870	1/2/5	13
Zwieselalm	Gosau	900–1436	1/2/4	9

=== Salzburg ===
Name	Village	Tourism region	Ski network	Sea level in m	Lifts	Pistes in km
Abtenau im Lammertal	Abtenau	Lammertal–Dachstein West	Salzkammergut-Lammertal Skipass	712–1200	0/1/5	10
Buchberg	Goldegg im Pongau	Salzburger Sportwelt	Ski amadé	850–1200	0/0/4	4
Dachstein West	Annaberg-Lungötz, Rußbach am Paß Gschütt (mit Gosau, OÖ)	Lammertal–Dachstein West	Salzkammergut-Lammertal Skipass	777–1618	8/14/30	152
Dorfgastein-Großarl	Dorfgastein, Großarl	Nationalpark Hohe Tauern / Gasteinertal/Großarltal	Ski amadé	865–2027	2/4/2	44
Dürrnberg	Hallein	Tennengau Salzachtal		800–1600	0/1/3	8
Fageralm	Forstau, Radstadt	Salzburger Sportwelt, Schladming–Dachstein^{St}	Ski amadé	930–1885	0/2/6	12
Fanningberg	Mariapfarr	Lungau		1501–2020	0/2/5	30
Filzmoos Roßbrand/Großberg	Filzmoos	Salzburger Sportwelt	Ski amadé	1057–1597	1/2/5	12
Flachau snow space	Flachau	Salzburger Sportwelt	Ski amadé	827–2000	7/17/18	111
Flachauwinkl–Kleinarl Shuttleberg	Kleinarl, Flachauwinkl	Salzburger Sportwelt	Ski amadé	1000–1980	0/5/5	16
Gaißau–Hintersee	Krispl	Salzkammergut – Fuschlsee		750–1567	0/3/6	40
Graukogel	Bad Gastein	Nationalpark Hohe Tauern / Gasteinertal	Ski amadé	1000–2246	0/2/1	14
Großeck–Speiereck	Mauterndorf, St. Michael im Lungau	Lungau		1100–2400	1/5/3	41
Hahnbaumlifte St. Johann	St. Johann im Pongau	Salzburger Sportwelt	Ski amadé	650–1200	2/6/6	32
Hochkönigs Winterreich	Mühlbach am Hochkönig, Dienten, Maria Alm (mit Hintermoos und Hinterthal)	Hochkönigs Bergreich	Ski amadé	860–1921	3/7/29	150
Kitzsteinhorn-Kaprun	Kaprun	Zell am See-Kaprun	Zell am See-Kaprun Schipaß	800–3029	4/4/10	40
Loferer Alm	Lofer	Salzburger Saalachtal		640–1750	2/2/9	46
Maiskogel	Kaprun	Zell am See-Kaprun	Zell am See-Kaprun Schipaß	765–1730	1/2/1	20
Monte Populo	Eben im Pongau	Salzburger Sportwelt	Ski amadé	862–1612	0/2/2	6
Obertauern	Obertauern	Obertauern		1665–2501	1/18/7	95
Postalm Arena am Wolfgangsee	Strobl	Salzkammergut – Wolfgangsee		1200–1900	0/1/7	20
Radstadt–Altenmarkt Schischaukel	Radstadt, Altenmarkt	Salzburger Sportwelt	Ski amadé	855–1677	1/3/3	20
Rauriser Hochalmbahnen	Rauris	Nationalpark Hohe Tauern		950–2200	2/1/7	25
Saalbach Hinterglemm Leogang Fieberbrunn	Saalbach-Hinterglemm, Leogang, Fieberbrunn^{T}	Saalbach-Hinterglemm	Skicircus Saalbach Hinterglemm Leogang Fieberbrunn	800–2100	28/22/20	270
St. Johann-Alpendorf	St. Johann im Pongau	Salzburger Sportwelt	Ski amadé	600–1850	1/7/5	26
St. Martin im Lammertal	St. Martin am Tennengebirge	Lammertal–Dachstein West	Salzkammergut-Lammertal Skipass	1000–1350	0/0/4	5
Schloßalm–Angertal–Stubnerkogel	Bad Gastein, Bad Hofgastein	Nationalpark Hohe Tauern / Gasteinertal	Ski amadé	859–2300	7/8/5	80
Schmittenhöhe	Zell am See	Zell am See-Kaprun	Zell am See-Kaprun Schipaß	750–2000	6/9/13	75
Sportgastein	Sportgastein	Nationalpark Hohe Tauern / Gasteinertal	Ski amadé	1584–2650	0/1/1	22
Wagrain	Wagrain	Salzburger Sportwelt	Ski amadé	850–2000	6/5/8	35
Weißsee–Gletscherwelt	Uttendorf	Nationalpark Hohe Tauern		804–2600	1/1/5	21
Werfenweng	Werfenweng	Tennengebirge		1000–1900	1/2/7	25
Wildkogel	Neukirchen am Großvenediger	Nationalpark Hohe Tauern		856–2225	2/3/8	54
Zauchensee–Flachauwinkel Skiparadies	Altenmarkt-Zauchensee, Flachauwinkl	Salzburger Sportwelt	Ski amadé	1350–2188	3/6/6	41
Zillertal Arena	Krimml, Wald im Pinzgau, Gerlos^{T} (mit dem Zillertal)	Nationalpark Hohe Tauern	Zillertal Arena	1250–2505	6/26/19	133
Zwölferhorn	St. Gilgen am Wolfgangsee	Salzkammergut – Wolfgangsee		560–1522	1/0/1	7

^{St} is in Styria
^{T} is in Tyrol

=== Styria ===
Name	VillageVillage	Tourism region/Ski network	Sea level in m	Lifts	Pistes in km
Aflenzer Bürgeralm	Aflenz Kurort		810–1810	0/2/4	16
Alpl	Krieglach		1000–1280	0/0/7	8
Brunnalm-Hohe Veitsch	Veitsch		1100–1500	0/1/3	9
Dockneralm	Krakaudorf		1220–1450	0/0/1	3
Elfenberg	Mautern in Steiermark		704–1020	0/1/0	4
Feichteck-Brandlucken	St. Kathrein am Offenegg		1050–1220	0/0/1	3
Gaaler Lifte	Gaal, Knittelfeld		860–1230	0/1/2	5
Gaberl-Stubalpe	Salla		800–1550	0/0/6	18
Galsterbergalm	Pruggern	Schladming–Dachstein / Ski amadé	700–1649	1/1/4	20
Grebenzen	Sankt Lambrecht		1000–1900	0/1/5	23
Gruber Lifte	Steinhaus am Semmering		938–1160	0/0/2	4,5
Hauereck	St. Kathrein am Hauenstein		1000–1305	0/1/1	5
Hauser Kaibling	Haus im Ennstal	Schladming–Dachstein / Ski amadé	728–2015	2/5/4	37
Hebalm (2015 aufgelassen)	Pack	–	−	–	–
Hebalm-Kluglifte	Deutschlandsberg		1350–1450	0/0/2	3
Hirschegg	Hirschegg		950–1300	0/1/5	5
Hohentauern	Hohentauern		1250–1800	0/0/5	12
Kaiserau	Rottenmann, Admont		1127–1500	0/0/3	3
Kleinlobming	Knittelfeld		764–1000	0/0/2	2
Kreischberg	St. Georgen ob Murau		870–2118	3/4/5	29
Lachtal	Schönberg-Lachtal, Judenburg		1600–2222	0/1/7	29
Lammeralm	Langenwang		900–1450	0/1/3	8
Loser-Altaussee	Altaussee	Salzkammergut-Ausseerland / Schneebärenland	850–1770	0/4/5	34
Mariazeller Land	Mariazell		800–1623	1/4/3	26
Modriach-Winkel	Modriach		1000–1230	0/0/4	5
Mönichwald-Hochwechsel	Mönichwald		1000–1300	0/0/3	4
Murauer Frauenalpe, (seit 2016/17 nicht geöffnet)	Murau		1500–2000	0/0/5	10
Niederalpl	Mürzsteg		783–1460	0/1/3	8
Oberes Murtal-Spitzerlift	St. Lorenzen bei Knittelfeld		990–1000	0/0/2	3
Parfußwirt	Trahütten, Deutschlandsberg		700–1100	0/0/1	4
Planai–Hochwurzen	Schladming	Schladming–Dachstein / Ski amadé	745–1894	4/13/17	123
Planneralm Snowvally	Donnersbach, Irdning	Schladming–Dachstein / Schneebärenland	1600–2200	0/2/3	15
Präbichl	Vordernberg		1116–1911	0/3/3	17
Schigebiet Ramsau-Dachsteingletscher	Ramsau am Dachstein	Schladming–Dachstein / Ski amadé	1100–2700	1/3/20	23
Reiteralm	Pichl-Gleiming	Schladming–Dachstein / Ski amadé	782–1860	1/3/7	30
Rieseralm	Obdach		1310–1520	0/0/4	10
Riesneralm	Donnersbachwald	Salzkammergut-Ausseerland / Schneebärenland	980–1990	0/3/1	32
Salzstiegl	Hirschegg		1310–1710	0/0/6	12
St. Jakob im Walde	St. Jakob im Walde		1000–1200	0/0/3	4
Schöckl	Sankt Radegund bei Graz		1045–1445	1/0/1	2
Seewiesen-Seeberg	Seewiesen		1000–1300	0/0/3	7
Sommeralm-Holzmeister	Breitenau am Hochlantsch		1240–1400	0/0/2	3
Sommeralm-Pirstingerkogel	Fladnitz an der Teichalm		1320–1400	0/0/1	3
Sonnberglifte	Wald am Schoberpass		850–1200	0/0/3	12
Stoderzinken	Gröbming	Schladming–Dachstein / Ski amadé	1700–2048	0/0/4	8
Strallegg	Strallegg			0/0/2	3
Stuhleck	Spital am Semmering		782–1640	0/2/6	20
Tauplitzalm	Tauplitz, Bad Mitterndorf	Salzkammergut-Ausseerland / Schneebärenland	900–2000	0/4/15	40
Teichalm	Fladnitz an der Teichalm		1200–1450	0/0/3	3
Tonnerhütte	Mühlen		1650–1820	0/0/1	4
Turnau-Schwabenberarena	Turnau		780–1150	0/0/3	4
Wenigzell	Wenigzell		940–1140	0/0/2	2
Wimmerlift	Hart-Purgstall, Gleisdorf		450–500	0/0/2	0,5

=== Tyrol ===
Name	Village	Sea level in m	Lifts	Pistes in km
Achensee-Maurach	Maurach	980–1848	1/2/1	14
Achensee-Pertisau	Pertisau	950–1496	1/0/7	16
Alpbachtal-Wildschönau	Alpbach, Reith im Alpbachtal, Inneralpbach, Wildschönau	670–2025	7/10/32	145
Axamer Lizum	Axams	1583–2304	1/5/4	41
Bergeralm	Steinach am Brenner	1048–2231	1/1/4	13
Berwang	Berwang	1336–1740	1/4/8	36
Biberwier-Marienberg	Lermoos	1000–1840	0/2/3	12
Brunnalm	St. Jakob in Defereggen	1400–2525	1/1/7	27
Christlum	Achenkirch am Achensee	950–1800	0/3/7	15
Dias Alpe	Kappl	1180–2700	1/3/4	40
Ehrwalder Alm	Ehrwald	1000–1922	1/2/4	19
Elferlifte Neustift	Neustift im Stubaital	1000–1812	4	10
Fendels-Ried im Oberinntal-Prutz-Faggen	Ried im Oberinntal	880–2300	1/1/4	14
Fügen-Spieljoch	Fügen	650–2100	2/3/3	21
Füssener Jöchle-Grän	Grän-Haldensee	1206–1823	1/1/3	9
Glungezer	Tulfes	950–2304	0/2/5	17
Grubigstein	Lermoos	1000–2120	1/3/3	30
Hintertux Glacier	Hintertux	1500–3250	5/6/10	86
Hochfügen-Hochzillertal	Hochfügen, Kaltenbach	558–2500	5/10/20	88
Hochimst	Imst	1000–2100	0/2/2	8
Hochoetz	Oetz in Tirol	820–2272	2/6/4	39
Hochpustertal	Sillian	1087–2407	1/2/3	45
Hochzeiger	Jerzens im Pitztal	1450–2450	1/4/4	52
Höfener Alm-Hahnenkamm	Höfen bei Reutte	875–1900	1/2/3	13
Kals am Großglockner	Kals am Großglockner	1365–2300	1/2/3	28
Kaunertal Gletscher	Kaunertal-Feichten, Fendels	2150–3200	1/2/6	36
Kellerjoch	Schwaz	545–2030	0/3/4	10
Kirchdorf	Kirchdorf in Tirol	700–900	0/1/1	4
Kitzbühel	Kitzbühel, Kirchberg, Aurach, Jochberg, Reith, Mittersill,^{S} Hollersbach^{S}	800–2000	11/27/7	215
Kössen	Kössen im Kaiserwinkl	600–1700	1/3/5	22
Kramsach	Kramsach	520–1800	0/0/2	1
Kühtai	Kühtai in Tirol	2020–2820	1/4/7	41
Leutasch	Weidach	1130–1650	0/1/5	15
Matreier Goldried	Matrei in Osttirol	1000–2405	1/3/5	35
Mutterer Alm	Mutters	830	2/1/1	
Naturpark Lechtal	Bach, Bschlabs, Elbigenalp, Elmen, Forchach, Gramais, Häselgehr, Hinterhornbach, Holzgau, Kaisers, Pfaffler, Stanzach, Steeg, Vorderhornbach	939–1800	0/1/3	
Nauders	Nauders am Reschenpass	1394–2850	1/6/5	75
Nesselwängle	Nesselwängle	1127–1560	0/1/4	5
Neunerköpfle	Tannheim	1100–1820	1/1/4	
Nordpark	Innsbruck	860–2260	2/2/0	14
Obergurgl-Hochgurgl	Obergurgl	1800–3080	4/12/7	110
Oberperfuss-Rangger Köpfl	Oberperfuss	820–2000	0/1/4	17
Obertilliach-Golzentipp	Obertilliach	1450–2250	0/1/4	16
Patscherkofel	Igls	900–2247	1/2/4	14
Pillersee	St. Ulrich am Pillersee, Hochfilzen	885–1550	0/2/6	22
Pitztal Gletscher & Rifflsee	St. Leonhard im Pitztal	1640–3440	2/2/5	35
Rohnenlifte	Zöblen	1100–1500	0/0/3	17
Saalbach Hinterglemm Leogang Fieberbrunn	Saalbach Hinterglemm,^{S} Leogang,^{S} Fieberbrunn	800–2100	28/22/20	270
St. Johann in Tirol	St. Johann in Tirol, Oberndorf in Tirol	685–1700	3/5/10	60
Sattelberg	Gries am Brenner	1200–2050	0/1/3	9
Schattwald-Zöblen	Schattwald	1095–1570	0/1/4	15
Schlick 2000	Fulpmes	1000–2300	2/1/6	25
See	See	1000–2450	3/2/4	40
Seefeld-Gschwandtkopf	Seefeld, Telfs	1200–1500	0/2/9	12
Seefeld-Rosshütte	Seefeld	1240–2100	3/3/4	21
Serfaus–Fiss–Ladis	Serfaus, Fiss, Ladis	1200–2820	12/16/11	162
Ski Arlberg	St. Anton am Arlberg, St. Christoph am Arlberg, Pettneu am Arlberg	1300–2811	16/34/49	305
Serleslifte	Mieders	982–1750	0/1/3	7
Silvretta Arena	Ischgl, Samnaun (Schweiz)	1360–2870	7/25/13	172
Silvrettapark	Galtür	1600–2300	0/3/7	40
Sölden	Sölden, Hochsölden	1350–3255	7/10/8	145
Steinplatte	Waidring	1100–1900	1/7/0	32
Stubaier Gletscher	Neustift im Stubaital	1750–3200	5/7/9	64
Tiroler Zugspitzbahn	Ehrwald	1225–2962	2/1/8	23
Venetregion	Landeck, Zams, Fließ	780–2212	1/3/3	22
Vent	Vent	1900–2650	0/1/3	15
Wilder Kaiser – Brixental	Brixen im Thale, Ellmau, Going, Hopfgarten im Brixental, Itter, Kelchsau, Scheffau am Wilden Kaiser, Söll, Westendorf	620–1956	15/36/40	284
Zahmer Kaiser	Walchsee im Kaiserwinkl	660–1060	0/1/7	15
Zettersfeld-Hochstein	Lienz	686–2278	1/4/7	40
Zillertal 3000	Mayrhofen, Finkenberg, Lanersbach, Vorderlanersbach	630–2500	7/17/22	146
Zillertal-Rastkogel-Eggalm	Tux	1300–2300	8/16/22	147
Zillertal Arena	Zell am Ziller, Gerlos, Krimml,^{S} Wald im Pinzgau^{S}	1300–2500	4/28/23	133

^{S} is in Salzburg

=== Vorarlberg ===
Name	Village	Sea level in m	Lifts	Pistes in km
Alberschwende	Alberschwende	720–1200	0/1/7	5
Andelsbuch	Andelsbuch, Bezau	655–1715	2/2/5	20
Bödele-Hochälpele	Schwarzenberg, Dornbirn	710–1467	0/1/8	23
Brandnertal	Brand	904–2000	2/7/5	55
Damüls-Mellau	Au, Damüls, Mellau	700–2007	2/11/4	90
Diedamskopf	Schoppernau	850–2060	2/2/4	39
Fontanella-Faschina	Fontanella	1485–2000	0/2/2	15
Fellhorn/Kanzelwand	Riezlern, Oberstdorf im Allgäu	920 - 1.967	13	37
Frastanz - Gurtis	Frastanz	900–1400	0/0/3	5
Gargellen	Gargellen	1423–2300	1/2/5	47
Golm	Tschagguns, Vandans, Matschwitz	650–2110	3/3/3	26
Grabs-Tschagguns	Tschagguns	700–1600	0/1/1	4
Hirschberg	Bizau	800–1700	0/1/5	30
Hittisberg	Hittisau	800	1	1
Hochhäderich	Hittisau	1300–1600	0/0/5	
Hochlitten Riefensberg	Riefensberg	1000–1200	0/0/3	
Hohenems - Schuttannen	Hohenems	1150–1320	0/0/2	4
Kleinwalsertal	Riezlern, Hirschegg, Mittelberg	920–2030	4/13/15	56
Kristberg-Silbertal	Silbertal im Montafon	890–1600	1/0/2	4
Luggi-Leitner	Möggers	800 - 1.000	3	3
Laterns-Gapfohl	Laterns, Innerlaterns	900–1785	0/2/4	27
Muttersberg	Bludenz	600–1400	1/0/0	22
Pfänder	Bregenz	421–1064	1/0/2	6
Raggal	Raggal	950-1250	4	11
Schetteregg	Egg im Bregenzerwald	1100–1400	0/5/1	10
Schneiderkopf-Buch	Buch		2	2
Sibratsgfäll-Krähenberg	Sibratsgfäll, Bregenzerwald	930-1100	2	2
Silvretta Montafon	Schruns, Silbertal, St. Gallenkirch, Gaschurn	700–2430	7/15/18	155
Ski Arlberg	Lech, Schröcken, Stuben, Warth, Zürs	1300–2800	16/34/49	350
Sonnenkopf	Wald am Arlberg	1000–2300	1/4/5	39
Sonntag	Sonntag	900–1750	1/1/1	8
Sulzberg	Sulzberg	970 - 1.007	1	0.2
Übersaxen - Gröllerkopf	Übersaxen	1000–1200	0/0/2	3
Wald am Arlberg	Wald am Arlberg, Innerwald	1030–2280		
Walmendingerhorn-Ifen-Heuberg Arena	Riezlern	1.086-2.030	20	67
Zwischenwasser - Furx	Zwischenwasser	900–1200	0/0/2	

=== Vienna ===
Name	Village	Sea level in m	Lifts	Pistes in km
Dollwiese	1130 Wien	k. A.	0/0/1	< 1
Hohe-Wand-Wiese	1140 Wien	258–370	0/0/1	< 1
