= Alvesta =

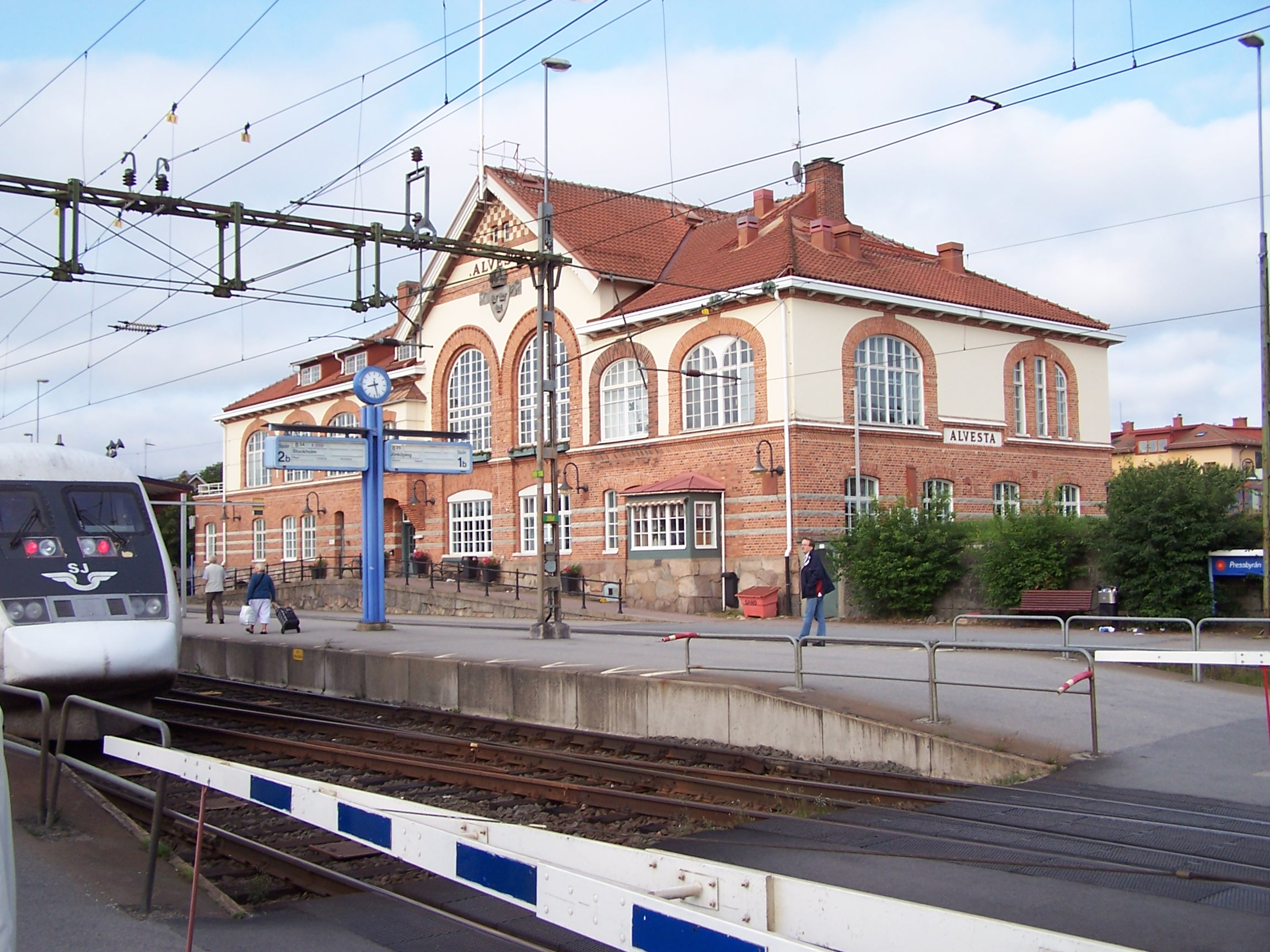
- Alvesta railway station (Alvesta järnvägsstation)

- Location within Kronoberg Location within Sweden
- Coordinates: 56°54′N 14°33′E
- Country: Sweden
- Province: Småland
- County: Kronoberg County
- Municipality: Alvesta Municipality

Area
  - Total: 6.10 km^{2} (2.36 sq mi)

Population (31 December 2010)
  - Total: 8,017
  - Density: 1,535/km^{2} (3,980/sq mi)
- Time zone: UTC+1 (CET)
  - Summer (DST): UTC+2 (CEST)

Alvesta (Swedish: [ˈâlːvɛsta]) is a locality and the seat of Alvesta Municipality in Kronoberg County, Sweden, with 8,017 inhabitants in the urban area in 2010.

Alvesta is an important railway junction, joining the Stockholm–Malmö–Copenhagen railway with the Gothenburg–Kalmar/Karlskrona railway.
