= Snälltåget =

Swedish long-distance train operator

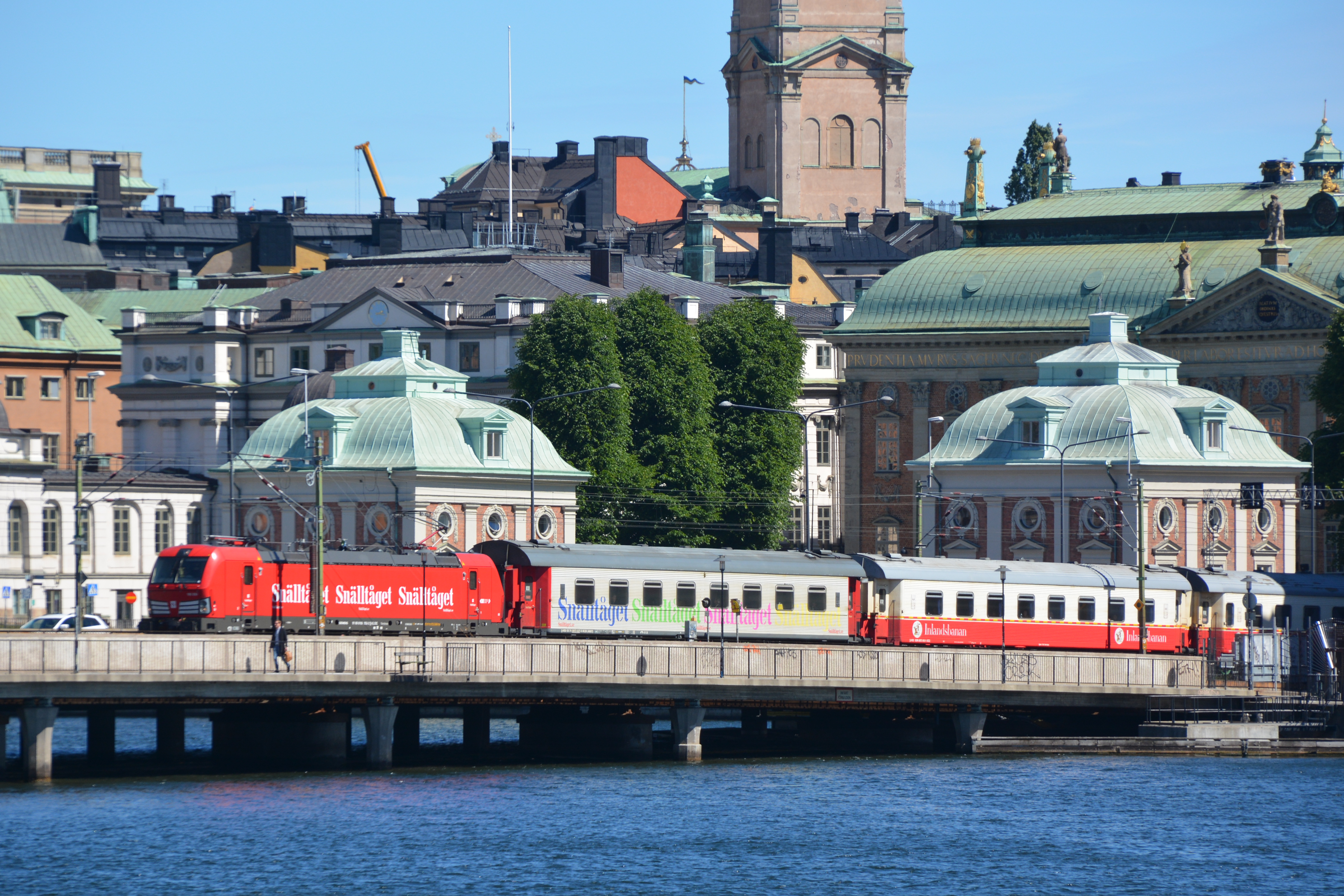
- Snälltåget train arriving to the Stockholm Central Station

Overview
- Main Route: Southern Main Line
- Other Routes: Western Main Line, Öresund Line, Central Line & East Coast Line
- Stations called at: 37
- Parent company: Transdev
- Dates of operation: 2006–

Other
- Website: www.snalltaget.se

Snälltåget (Note: The name is cognate to German Schnellzug, meaning "fast train", although using an archaic meaning of snäll (the word means "kind/nice" in modern Swedish).) is an open-access railway company in Sweden with long-distance trains along the Southern Main Line in Sweden from Malmö to Stockholm; as well as sleeper trains between Stockholm and Berlin, and from Malmö to the ski and hiking resorts in Jämtland county (Sweden), and to Innsbruck for ski areas in Austria.

As of November 2025 a daily day-time connection was planned between Stockholm and Hamburg, Germany to start from May 2026.

== History ==
Snälltåget was set up in 2006 (first departure 31 January 2007) as Veolia Transport after partial deregulation of the Swedish rail network running ad hoc services. Regular weekend services began in 2009 (expanding to weekdays in 2010), after the network was fully deregulated, running in direct competition with the state-owned operator SJ. The summer night train extension to Berlin was launched in 2012 with the network rebranding as Snälltåget in November 2013.

From September 2016, a brand new fleet of Class 193 Vectron locomotives were added to replace the hired commonly used Hector Rail Class 242 Taurus and the Class 241 Traxx. Together with coaches from Germany, they started operation at 200 km/h, the first time for locomotives and railcars in Sweden.

Until 2019 it operated with train ferry via Trelleborg to Sassnitz. In 2020, this train and the ferry route was cancelled because of the COVID-19 pandemic. From June 2021 a modified night train over the Great Belt Fixed Link without ferry was launched, between Stockholm, Copenhagen and Berlin.

In November 2021, Snälltåget's parent company Transdev expressed its intention to sell the company.

In January 2022, a new overnight service from Malmö to Salzburg via Zell am See and other ski resorts in the Austrian Central Eastern Alps along the Salzburg-Tyrol Railway commenced.

In April 2024 it was announced that one of the daily departures on the Stockholm–Malmö route would be extended to Copenhagen Central Station station via the Øresund Bridge during the summer, in addition to the Stockholm–Berlin night train which already made a stop at the Copenhagen Ørestad station.

In early-2025 Snälltåget registered its interest via the Norwegian Railway Authority to run their fleet of 53 carriages and five locomotives on future routes across the border into Norway. Possible routes under consideration were Oslo‒Gothenburg‒Malmö‒Copenhagen‒(Hamburg‒Berlin), Narvik‒Stockholm‒Malmö, and Trondheim‒Stockholm‒Malmö.

== Routes ==
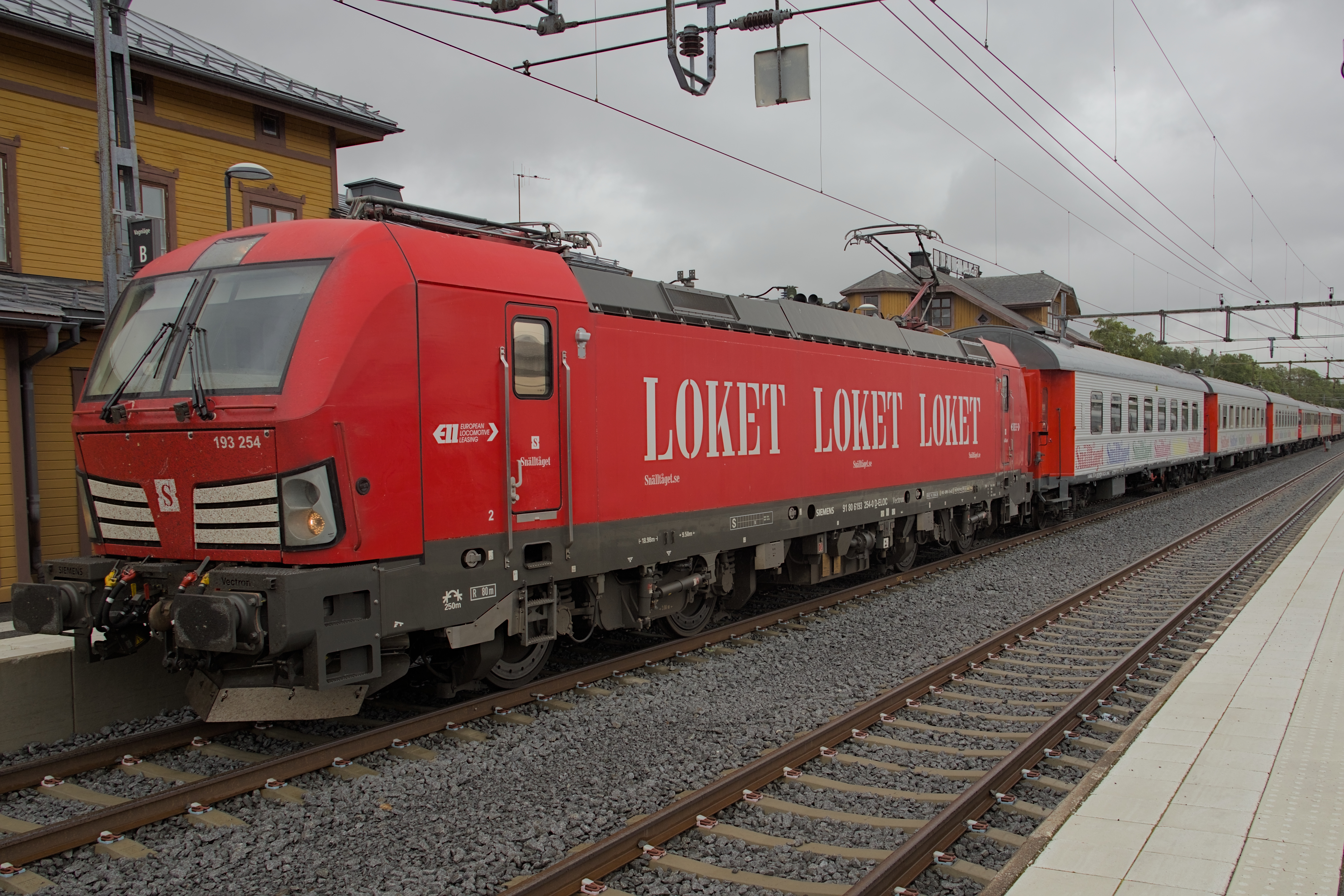
Snälltåget train at Storlien station.

Snälltåget operates four different routes:

The main route is operated from Copenhagen to Stockholm via Malmö, Lund, Eslöv, Hässleholm, Alvesta, Nässjö, Linköping and Norrköping throughout the year.

In hiking and skiing seasons, Snälltåget operates night trains between Malmö and Storlien, via Stockholm and Åre.

Between April and September, as well as on selected days during the rest of the year a night train also operates from Stockholm to Berlin, via Copenhagen, Malmö, and Hamburg.

In winter, a train runs weekly between Malmö and Innsbruck, via Salzburg and Zell am See, serving multiple stations with connections to Austrian ski resorts.

As of November 2025, Snälltåget were planning to start a daily day-time service between Hamburg and Stockholm across Denmark. Inside Germany, stops would be at Hamburg Hauptbahnhof and Neumünster station.

== Owner ==
Snälltåget is owned by Transdev.

== See also ==
- Rail transport in Sweden
- Rail transport in Europe
- Train categories in Europe
