= Jernhusen =

Swedish rail transport enterprise

Jernhusen AB
- Type: Government enterprise
- Industry: Railways
- Predecessor: Statens Järnvägar
- Founded: 1 January 2001; 25 years ago
- Headquarters: Sweden
- Website: www.jernhusen.se

Jernhusen AB is a Swedish state-owned company that owns and manages real estate properties that are or have been connected to the Swedish railway network. This includes railway stations, office buildings, terminals, and train maintenance facilities. Most of the properties are located in or around major cities.

== History and operations ==
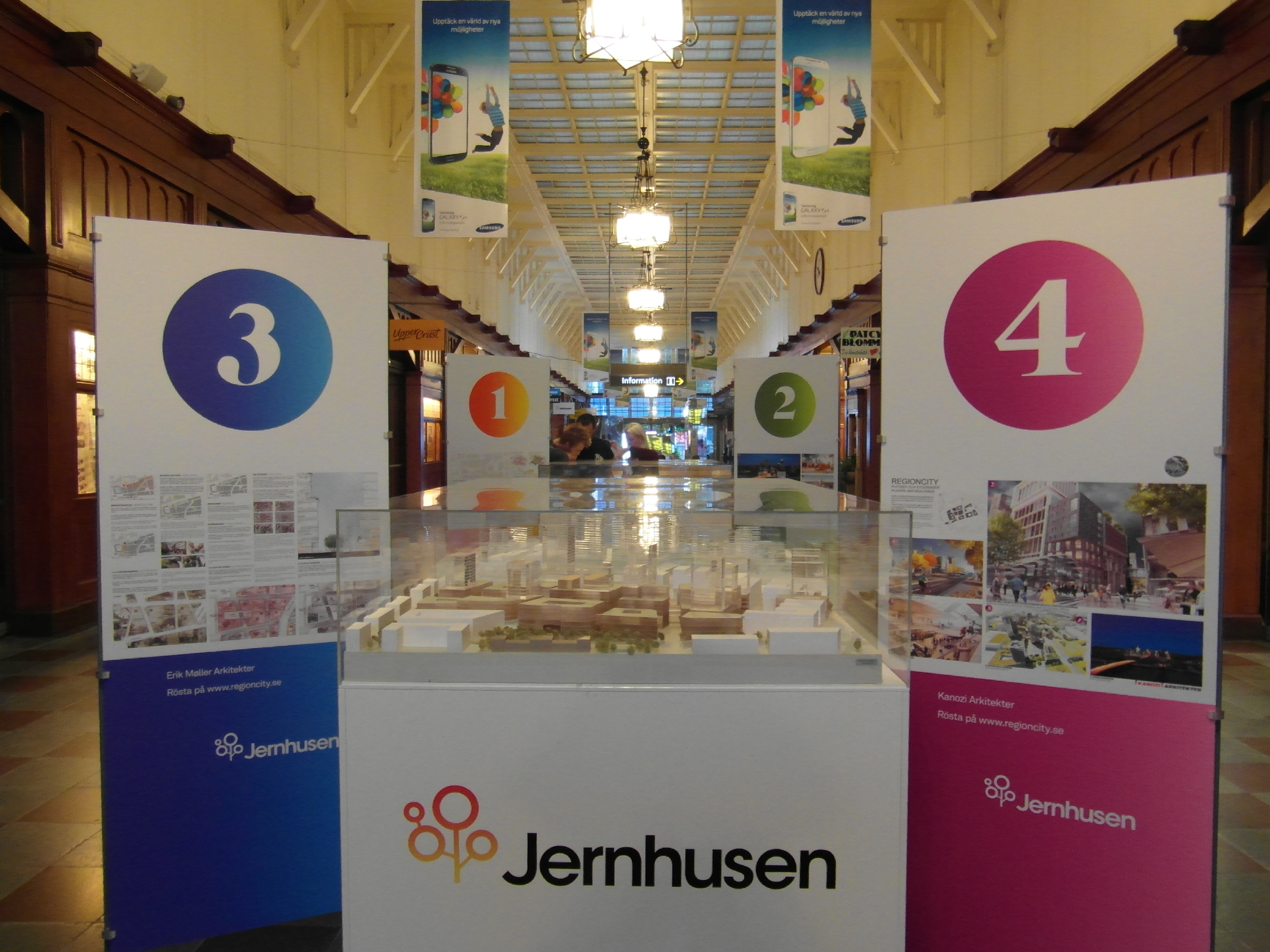
Jernhusen informational display at Gothenburg Central Station

Jernhusen AB was established in January 2001 following the restructuring of Statens Järnvägar, previously operating as the division SJ Fastigheter. The company is wholly owned by the Government of Sweden. Jernhusen's mandate from the state is to contribute to the development of stations and workshops and make them available to train operators, passengers, and other users on competitive and neutral terms.

Jernhusen's largest and most well-known properties are the central stations in Stockholm, Gothenburg, and Malmö. A significant part of its business involves leasing station premises to shops, restaurants, and kiosks. Between 2008 and 2015, Jernhusen began selling off smaller stations that were not generating significant revenue. The most common buyers were municipalities or local businesses. During this period, the company nearly halved its real estate portfolio.

Jernhusen owns intermodal terminals in Stockholm (Stockholm Årsta intermodal terminal), Västerås, Nässjö, Helsingborg, and Malmö, many of which are operated by contracted companies. Arenastaden was built on land owned by Jernhusen, which, together with Peab, Fabege, Solna Municipality, and the Swedish Football Association, formed a company to build and develop Friends Arena in Solna. At the end of 2016, Jernhusen sold its shares in the company to Fabege.
