= SJ F33 =

F33
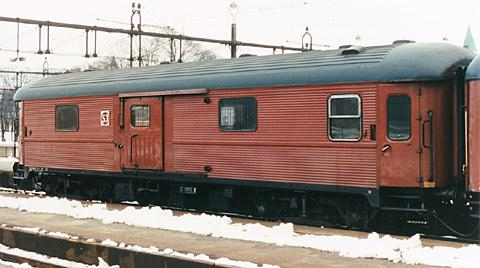
- A F33 wagon in Malmö, 1988
- In service: 1961-2000
- Manufacturer: Kalmar verkstad
- Constructed: 1961-1962
- Entered service: 1961
- Number built: 35
- Number in service: 0
- Operators: SJ(former)

Specifications
- Car length: 16,000 mm (52 ft 5 7/8 in)
- Width: 3,140 mm (10 ft 3 5/8 in)
- Height: 4,070 mm (13 ft 4 1/4 in)
- Maximum speed: 160 km/h (99 mph)
- Weight: 31 tons
- Track gauge: 1,435 mm (4 ft 8 1/2 in) standard gauge

F33, earlier Fo5a and F5, is a Swedish baggage car of the 1960s-car designed and manufactured by Kalmar Verkstad (KVAB) between 1961 and 1962 for the only customer SJ. The wagons feature a 33-square-metre (360 sq ft) storage area for luggage, as well as a rest area for the staff of the train. In the year of 2000 SJ decided to discontinue their use of luggage cars which subsequently led to the F33 being phased out immediately.
