= SJ WL1 =

WL1
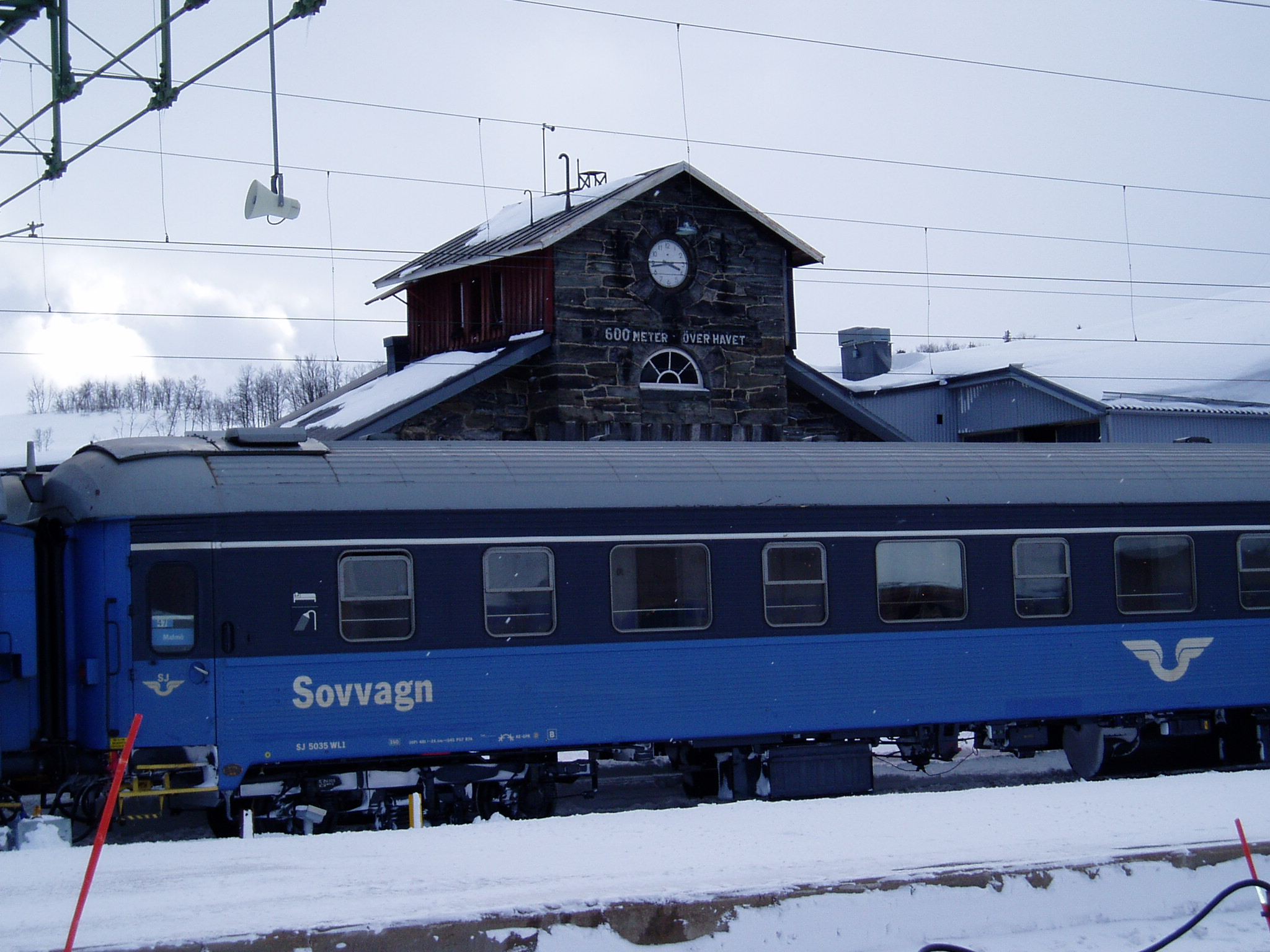
- A WL1 carriage at Storlien in 2006
- In service: 1964–present
- Manufacturer: Kalmar Verkstad
- Constructed: 1964-1965
- Entered service: 1964
- Refurbished: 1996-1997
- Number built: 25
- Number in service: 19
- Number preserved: 23
- Number scrapped: 2
- Operator: SJ

Specifications
- Car length: 24,500 mm (80 ft 4 5/8 in)
- Width: 3,140 mm (10 ft 3 5/8 in)
- Height: 4,300 mm (14 ft 1 1/4 in)
- Maximum speed: 160 km/h (99 mph)
- Weight: 48 tons
- Track gauge: 1,435 mm (4 ft 8 1/2 in) standard gauge

WL1 is a Swedish sleeping car of the 1960s type carriage. The carriages were built Kalmar Verkstad (KVAB) between 1964 and 1965. The carriages feature 10 sleeping compartments and one shower in their current configuration. The original configuration didn't feature a shower, instead it feature 11 sleeping compartments. The eleventh compartment was replaced by the shower during the 1996-1997 refurbishment of the carriages. The type is also the last of 1960s type carriages that currently is in operation with SJ.

The carriages are numbered in the numbers 5013–5037. All carriages except 5020 and 5026 are still intact. The carriages 5020 and 5026 have both been scrapped due to accidents. As of November 2020, another four carriages were taken out of service and waiting to be audited. Currently [when?], there is an ongoing procurement process to see which company that is going to complete the audit of the carriages.

== Carriages taken out of service ==
- 5018 (Awaiting audit)
- 5020 (Scrapped)
- 5025 (Awaiting audit)
- 5026 (Scrapped)
- 5029 (Awaiting audit)
- 5030 (Awaiting audit)
