= X15 (disambiguation) =

The North American X-15 is an American experimental hypersonic research aircraft.

X15 or X-15 may also refer to:

- X-15 (band), an American rock band
- X-15 (film), a 1961 American drama
- X15 (New York City bus)
- BeagleBoard X15, a single board computer
- Bingo-Akasaka Station, in Hiroshima Prefecture, Japan
- Cummins X15, a diesel engine
- HMS Lambridge, a Q-ship of the Royal Navy
- Raduga Kh-15 or RKV-15 (Russian: Х-15; NATO: AS-16 "Kickback"), a Russian air-to-ground missile
- SJ X15, a Swedish electrical multiple unit train
