= Linx (railway company) =

Former Scandinavian railway operator

Linx AB
- Company type: Joint venture
- Industry: Rail transport
- Founded: 2000
- Defunct: 2004
- Headquarters: Gothenburg, Sweden
- Area served: Scandinavia
- Revenue: SEK 426.8 million (2003)
- Owner: Norwegian State Railways (50%); SJ (50%)
- Number of employees: 170

Linx AB was a railway company which operated inter-Scandinavian passenger trains between 2001 and 2004. Established as a joint venture between the Norwegian State Railways (NSB) and the Swedish state-owned SJ, Linx operated the routes from Oslo, Norway, to Stockholm, Sweden, and from Oslo via Gothenburg, Sweden, to Copenhagen, Denmark. Services were provided up to ten times per day. However, slow speeds caused by curvy infrastructure in Norway, combined with competition from low-cost airlines, caused the company to lose money, and eventually grounded operations. The services were taken over by NSB and SJ. The main rolling stock were eleven X2 electric multiple units, although it used SJ Rc-hauled trains on the Gothenburg–Oslo service. The company was based in Gothenburg.

== History ==
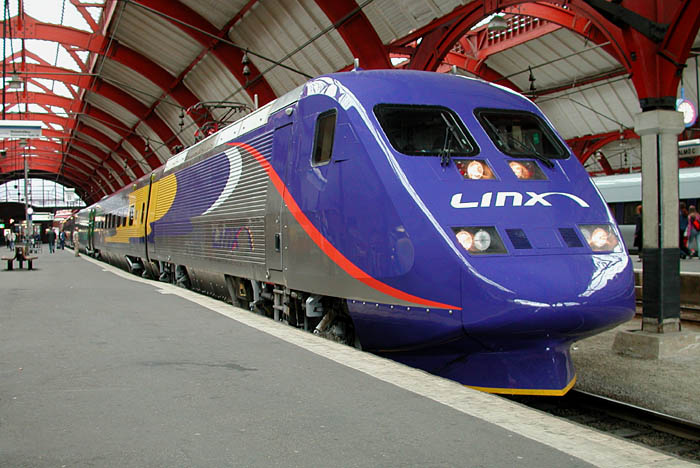
Linx X2 train at Malmö Central Station

Linx was established following an informal agreement between the ministers of transport in Norway, Sweden and Denmark to establish high-speed rail connection between the countries' capitals. Linx was the train operating part of the agreement, while the governments would have to invest in better rail infrastructure to allow higher speeds.

The company was introduced by NSB and SJ on 12 May 2000. The stated plans were to start with the service from Gothenburg to Copenhagen in January 2001, from Oslo to Gothenburg in June, and from Oslo to Stockholm in January 2002. The company would have its head office in Gothenburg and would lease rolling stock from SJ. NSB's chief executive officer, Osmund Ueland, became the company's first chair. The company had a share capital of 10 million Swedish krona (SEK) and was owned in equal shares by NSB and SJ. The company's first train ran on 7 January, from Gothenburg to Copenhagen. Service from Oslo to Gothenburg started on 17 June.

Because Linx was only to operate profitable routes, it was decided that the company not take over the night train service from Oslo to Copenhagen. NSB stated that they wanted all inter-Scandinavian passenger transport to be operated by the new company, and therefore decided to terminate the night train as of September 2. Although the night trains were filled during the summer and parts of the winter, there was a low ridership during the rest of the year. However, it was a lack of engineers that forced NSB to terminate the night train service as of 20 June. There were protests against the ending of the service, particularly in Norway. Marketing Director Øyvind Rørslett of Linx stated that "we are concentrating on the day trains. We want to develop a holistic concept, where new modern trains are a major part. Night trains do not fit into this concept".

X2 trains were never introduced on the section from Gothenburg to Oslo. Linx stated that investments for NOK 2 billion were needed on the Østfold Line to reach a travel time from Oslo to Gothenburg of 3 hours and 30 minutes, rather than the more than 4 hours at the time. In contrast, the Norway/Vänern Line on the Swedish side of the border meets the necessary standards.

The first service from Oslo to Stockholm ran on 16 June 2002. Initially there were only three daily services, but later that year, two more daily services were introduced. At the same time, travel time was reduced by 20 minutes, as the trains stopped at only three intermediate stations. Linx operated with different prices on the same route, depending on if the ticket was bought in Norway or Sweden. The company stated that this was in part because of a strong Norwegian krone, in part because Norwegians were willing to pay more, and in part because the sales system in Sweden was more automated.

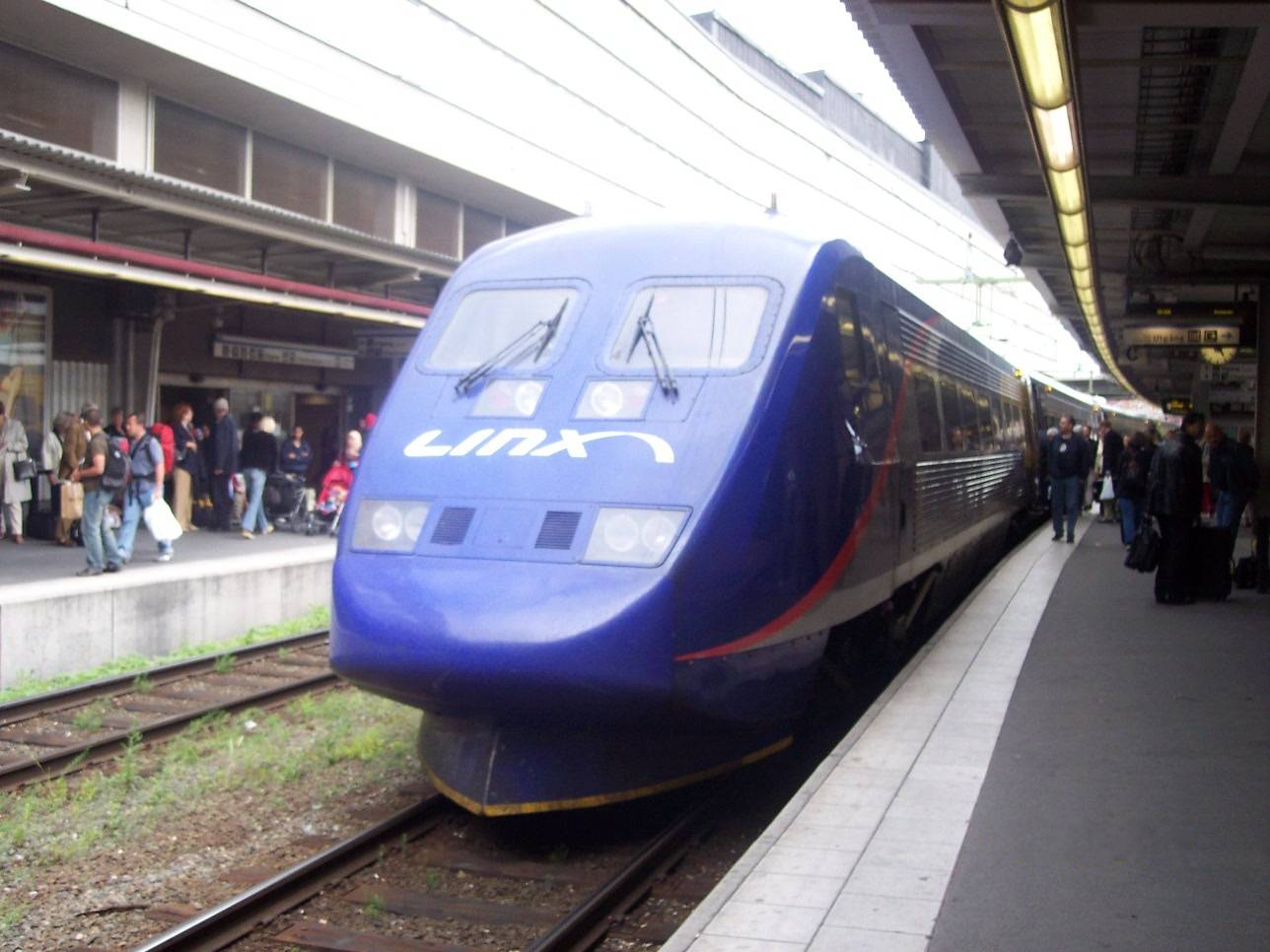
Linx X2 unit at Stockholm Central Station

In July 2003, Linx reduced the number of daily services from Gothenburg to Copenhagen from ten to four. The company stated that this was because of insufficient ridership. Linx had offered tickets with a lower price than Scandinavian Airlines, who operated the airline service between Oslo Airport, Gardermoen and Stockholm-Arlanda Airport. Ryanair also provided an airline service, but with fewer departures and with the same center-to-center transport time because it flew from the secondary Sandefjord Airport, Torp and Stockholm-Skavsta Airport. From 1 September 2003, Norwegian Air Shuttle started services from Gardermoen to Arlanda, and became a more direct competitor to Linx. From 27 October, Nordic Airlink (later FlyNordic) also started a flight between the same airports. With shorter travel time from center to center and comparable fares, Norwegian and Nordic started taking market shares away from Linx.

Starting on December 15, NSB took over three of the daily services from Oslo to Gothenburg, by extending three of the InterCity services along the Østfold Line onwards from Halden Station to Gothenburg. On 24 January 2004, a Linx train derailed at Vestby Station on the Østfold Line. None of the 50 passengers were hurt in the incident.

On 11 June 2004, NSB and SJ stated that they would discontinue Linx, and would operate the last train on 31 December 2004. The company had never made a profit, and the new low-cost airlines had reduced ridership by up to 40%. The only part of the service which was profitable was the service from Stockholm to Karlstad, which SJ intended to continue. NSB stated that if a new Oslo–Stockholm service was to be introduced, it would require state grants. In September, SJ's CEO Jan Forsberg stated that the problems lay with the infrastructure in Norway. While the speeds were high enough to operate with a profit in Sweden and to Copenhagen, the slow lines in Norway made services to Norway unprofitable. Linx had by then transported 1.3 million passengers, and Forsberg stated that had the company transported 1.7 million people, it would have been profitable.

The closing was criticized by two engineers, who stated that the company actually made a profit, but ended up paying 24% of their revenue in ticket commission to SJ and NSB. In 2003, the company had a revenue of SEK 426.8 million, of which SEK 411 million was from ticket sales. The company had a deficit of SEK 33.8 million, of which NSB covered SEK 8.1 million and SJ SEK 25.6 million. However, NSB took a commission of SEK 10.8 million and SJ SEK 58.5 million. This gave a profit, before provisions, of SEK 35.5 million. In comparison, Narvesen took a commission of 2.7% for tickets sold by NSB.

The closing of the Oslo–Stockholm service was the first time there was not a train service between the capitals since 1871, when the line opened. In addition, the service cut occurred at the same time as the centennial of the dissolution of the union between Norway and Sweden. On 4 November, SJ and NSB stated that they would continue the service, but only on weekends. They stated that an increased service would either require financial grants from the states, or introduction of duty-free sales on board.

== Service ==
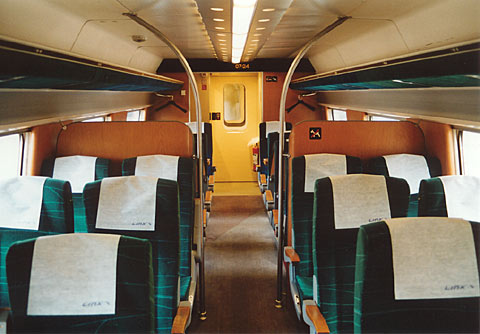
Interior of a Linx X2 train

Travel time from Oslo to Stockholm was 4 hours and 30 minutes, with stops at Oslo Central Station, Lillestrøm Station, Kongsvinger Station, Karlstad Central Station, and Stockholm Central Station. When the service was launched, a ticket from Oslo to Stockholm cost NOK 563, or NOK 326 if bought at least seven days before departure. Two people under the age of 16 could travel for free when accompanying an adult. Later, minimum prices of NOK 280 were launched, while maximum price for business class was NOK 1300. Tickets were slightly cheaper to purchase in Sweden than in Norway. About 185,000 passengers took the train from Oslo to Stockholm each year.

Travel time from Gothenburg to Copenhagen was 3 hours and 30 minutes. The X2 trains had a speed of up to 200 km/h (125 mph) on the West Coast Line from Gothenburg Central Station to Malmö Central Station, and then ran along the Öresund Line via Copenhagen Airport to Copenhagen Central Station. A ticket from Gothenburg to Copenhagen cost NOK 1119 in business class, NOK 803 in second class, and with reduced prices down to NOK 342 if bought in advance or for weekend travel.

Travel time from Oslo to Gothenburg was slightly more than four hours. Prices varied from NOK 633 for a business class ticket, NOK 355 for a second class ticket to NOK 187 for pre-booked tickets. X2 trains were never introduced on the section from Oslo to Gothenburg. Instead, conventional Swedish trains from the 1960s hauled by Rc locomotives were used. Passengers traveling from Oslo to Copenhagen had to change train in Gothenburg.

== Rolling stock ==
On the sections Oslo–Stockholm and Gothenburg–Copenhagen, Linx operated X2 electric multiple units owned by SJ. Forty-three units were delivered to SJ by Kalmar Verkstad between 1990 and 1997. The trains are standard gauge, have a power output of 3,260 kilowatts (4,370 hp) and a maximum speed of 200 kilometres per hour (120 mph). Each train consists of a locomotive, a number of middle cars and an end car. The trains use 15 kV 16.7 Hz AC power supply in Sweden and Norway, and 25 kV 50 Hz AC in Denmark. Linx had two classes: business and second. On business class, a warm meal and drink was included, while in second class, a restaurant car was provided. Seats had a power outlet for laptops, and free wireless Internet.
