= AB7 (railway carriage) =

Class of Swedish rail passenger car

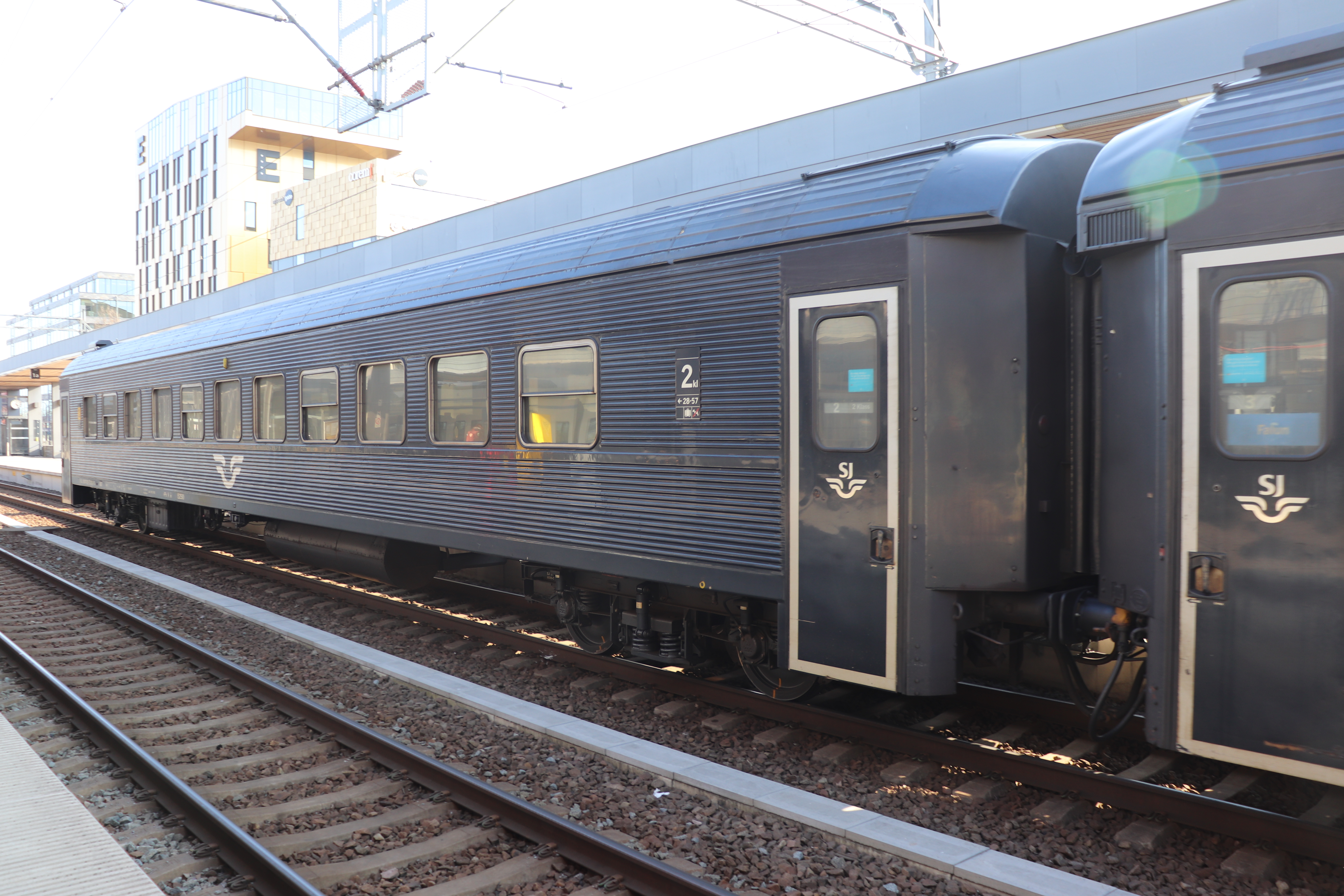
- Stock type: Passenger car
- In service: 1979–present (B7); 1980–present (A7)
- Manufacturers: Kalmar Verkstad; TGOJ Malmö
- Family name: 1980s-cars
- Constructed: 1979-1990 as B7; 1980-1987 as A7
- Entered service: 2009
- Refurbished: 2009-2010
- Number built: 19
- Fleet numbers: 5231-5243, 5245, 5246, 5249, 5250, 5579
- Capacity: 57 (27 1st class, 30 2nd class)
- Operator: SJ

Specifications
- Car length: 26.4 metres (28.9 yd)
- Width: 3.08 metres (3.37 yd)
- Height: 4.4 metres (4.8 yd)
- Wheelbase: 2500 + 18500 mm
- Maximum speed: 160 km/h (99 mph)
- Weight: 46-47 tons depending on version
- Bogies: MD80
- Braking system: KE-GPR
- Track gauge: 1,435 mm (4 ft 8 1/2 in) standard gauge

AB7 is a Swedish passenger car of 1980s style featuring both first and second class seating. It has its origins in the 2008 decision to refurbish carriages originally built in the 1980s. As a part of the modernization program in 2009-2010, SJ rebuilt all of their AB9 carriages to a more modern version, designated the AB7. The main difference is that the smoking section of the carriages were removed. The carriages feature an open saloon as the seating area, as well as 230 V power outlets and 4 restrooms in each carriage with 2 in each end. Today they are in service with SJs regional trains and InterCity trains, along B7 and RB7 (combined bistro and second class) carriages for example.

The name, AB7 follows SJs naming scheme where the "A" stands for first class carriage and the "B" stands for second class carriage. Together they stand for a combined carriage. In this case the first class has 27 seats and the second class has 30 seats.
