= X 2000 =

Swedish high-speed tilting train

X2
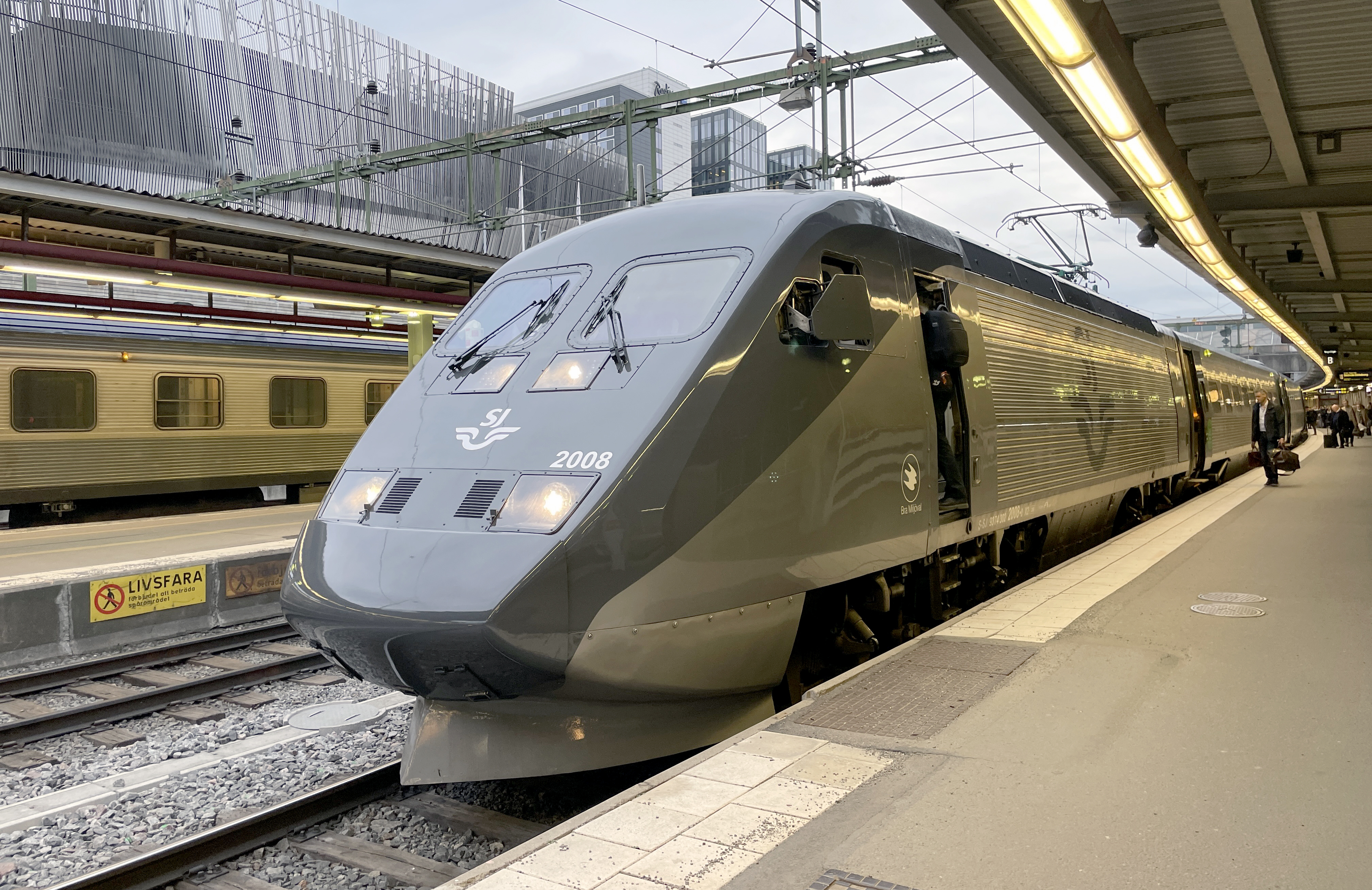
- Refurbished X2 train at Stockholm Central Station

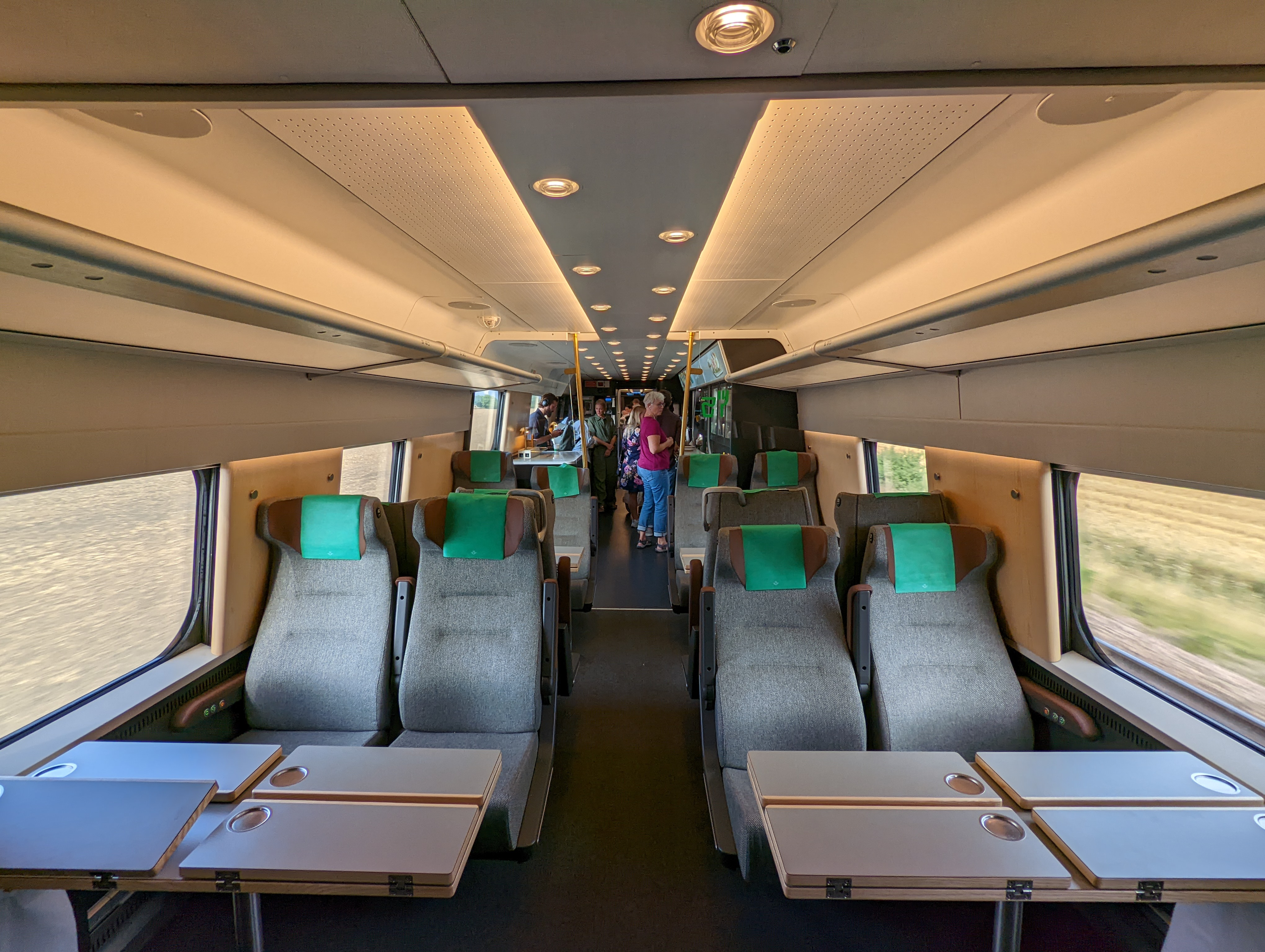
- Refurbished Interior
- Stock type: Electric multiple unit
- In service: 1990–present
- Manufacturers: ABB, Adtranz and Kalmar Verkstad
- Built at: Västerås (ABB, electrical part), Kalmar (mechanical part)
- Constructed: 1989–1998
- Entered service: 4 September 1990 – present
- Refurbished: 2003–2007; 2019–
- Number built: 44
- Formation: 1 power car + 4 or 5 intermediate coaches + 1 control coach
- Fleet numbers: SJ: 2001–2043, Xinshisu: 2088
- Capacity: 51 seated (1st class coach); 72 seated (2nd class coach); 28+18 seated (2nd class coach + bistro); 41 seated (2nd class cab coach)
- Operators: SJ; Amtrak (formerly); GSRC (formerly)
- Depots: Hagalund; Olskroken Train Depot
- Lines served: Stockholm to Gothenburg; Stockholm to Malmö; Stockholm to Copenhagen (X2000); Stockholm to Strömstad (Seasonal); Stockholm to Oslo (Seasonal); Gothenburg to Malmö

Specifications
- Car body construction: Corrugated stainless steel
- Train length: 139.31 m (457 ft 5/8 in) (6 cars); 164.26 m (538 ft 10 7/8 in) (7 cars)
- Car length: Power car: 17,255 mm (56 ft 7 3/8 in); Coach: 24.95 m (81 ft 10 1/4 in); Cab coach: 22,255 mm (73 ft 1/8 in)
- Width: 3.05 m (10 ft 0 in)
- Height: 3.814 m (12 ft 6 1/8 in)
- Floor height: Coach: 1.26 m (49 5/8 in)
- Wheel diameter: Power car: 1,100 mm (43.31 in); Coach: 880 mm (34.65 in)
- Wheelbase: Bogie 2.9 m (114.17 in); Bogie centres of power car 8,975 mm (29 ft 5 3/8 in); Bogie centres of coaches 17.7 m (58 ft 7/8 in); Bogie centres of cab coach 14.5 m (47 ft 6 7/8 in)
- Maximum speed: Service: 200 km/h (125 mph); Design: 210 km/h (130 mph); Record: 276 km/h (171 mph)
- Weight: Power car: 73 t (72 long tons; 80 short tons); Coach, tare: 47 t (46 long tons; 52 short tons); Coach with bistro, tare: 49 t (48 long tons; 54 short tons); Control coach, tare: 55 t (54 long tons; 61 short tons)
- Axle load: 17.5 t (17.2 long tons; 19.3 short tons)
- Power output: 3,260 kW (4,370 hp)
- Tractive effort: Power car: 160 kN (36,000 lb_{f}) max.; 107 kN (24,000 lb_{f}) cont. @108 km/h (67 mph); 110 kN (25,000 lb_{f}) braking from 130 km/h (81 mph) to 0 km/h (0 mph)
- Electric system: 15 kV 16.7 Hz AC + 25 kV 50 Hz AC catenary
- Current collection: Pantograph
- UIC classification: Bo′Bo′+2′2′+2′2′+2′2′+2′2′(+2′2′)+2′2′
- Braking systems: Loco: brake shoe on rim (air) and regenerative brake; Coach: disc brake and magnetic brake
- Safety systems: ATC-2, ZUB 123
- Coupling system: Automatic (which type?)
- Track gauge: 1,435 mm (4 ft 8 1/2 in) standard gauge

X 2000, officially designated X2, is an electric high-speed tilting train operated by SJ in Sweden. It has a top commercial speed of 200 km/h (125 mph) and a top design speed of 210 km/h (130 mph) but has achieved a maximum speed of 276 km/h (171 mph) in tests. It primarily serves major routes, including Stockholm–Gothenburg and Stockholm–Malmö–Copenhagen.

The X2 project began in 1969 as a collaboration between Kalmar Verkstad, Swedish State Railways (SJ), and ASEA. In 1986, SJ placed an order for 20 sets of a new type of train. Asea was responsible for manufacturing the electrical components, while Kalmar Verkstad (Statsföretag) was responsible for the mechanical design and manufacturing. Ultimately, a total of 44 train sets were built.

The trains, designed and manufactured in Kalmar, Sweden, were launched in 1990 as a first-class only train with a meal included in the ticket price, and free use of the train's fax machine. From 1995 second class was introduced. The fleet has undergone various refurbishments over time, most recently ongoing since 2020.

== Background and development ==
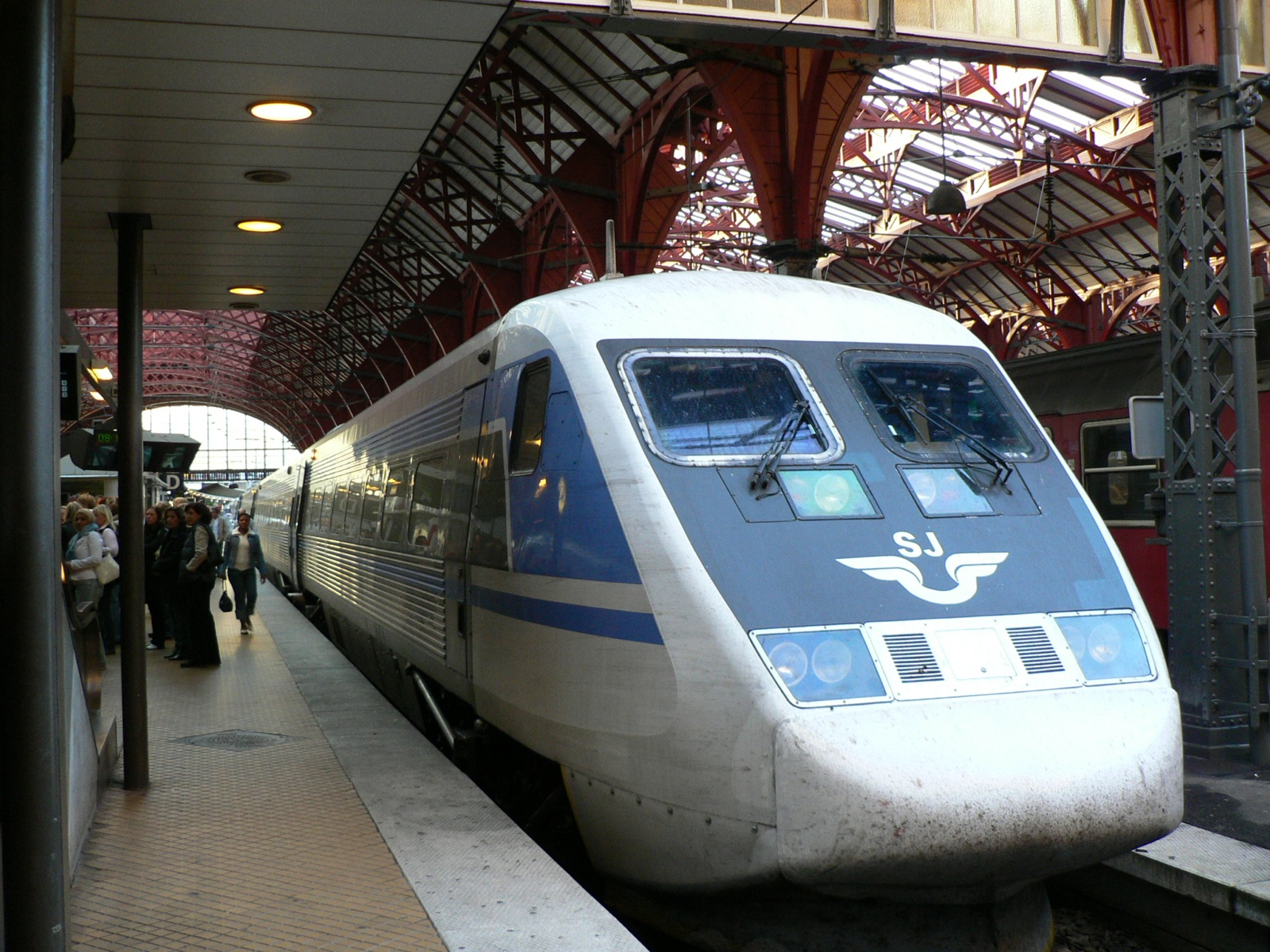
An X 2000 in original livery at Copenhagen Central Station in September 2005

The X2 was developed to address the challenges posed by Sweden's railway network, which features numerous sharp curves (like in almost all countries) due to the country's geography. At the same time, Sweden’s low population density made the construction of dedicated high-speed rail lines impractical before 1990.

To overcome these constraints, the X2 was designed as a tilting train, allowing it to maintain theoretically 15% higher speeds while navigating curves. Tilting trains can comfortably travel through curves up to 15% faster speeds than conventional non-tilting trains, without the need for significant infrastructure changes.

The X2 project began in 1969 as a collaboration between Kalmar Verkstad, Statens Järnvägar, and Asea. Testing started in the 1970s.

In the late 1960s, an X1 multiple unit was modified with a tilting carbody on new Asea bogies with pneumatic cylinders. Later, an X5 train was adapted for high-speed tests designated X15, featuring hydraulic tilt cylinders. X15 data informed X2 development, and an X2 prototype car (X15-4) was tested in the same trainset. In August 1986, SJ ordered the first X2 trainsets from Kalmar Verkstad and Asea.

Manufacturing introduced new welding and structural techniques, producing a rigid, collision-absorbing body with reduced corrosion and maintenance needs.

The X2 influenced later trains, including the C20 (Stockholm metro), Bombardier Regina, X31, the NSB Class 71 in Norway, and the Bombardier Movia series.

The X2 entered commercial service on 4 September 1990 between Stockholm and Gothenburg. Production ended in March–April 1998.

== Name ==
According to Swedish State Railways’s classification system, electric multiple units (Swedish: Elmotorvagn) were assigned designations starting with "X". This convention has applied to various SJ train types, such as the X5 and X40 units, and has also been used by other companies, such as SL's X10 commuter trains and X15p local trains.

The X2 tractive unit is a heavy locomotive with four axles, an axle load of 18,5 tonnes and a maximum continuous power of 3 260 kW (Rc-locomotive 3 600 kW).

The official designation of the X 2000 is X2. The name started as X 2000 a marketing concept for their service introduced when the trains entered service in 1990, and has since been used by SJ to refer to the train type itself. The trains were also used by Linx, a joint venture with NSB, without the X2000 name.

Since December 2011, SJ services using X2 or X55 (also known as SJ 3000) trains are referred to SJ High-Speed Train (Swedish: SJ Snabbtåg, lit. 'SJ Fast Train'). The train has also been labelled as SJ X2, and SJ2000.

== Speed ==
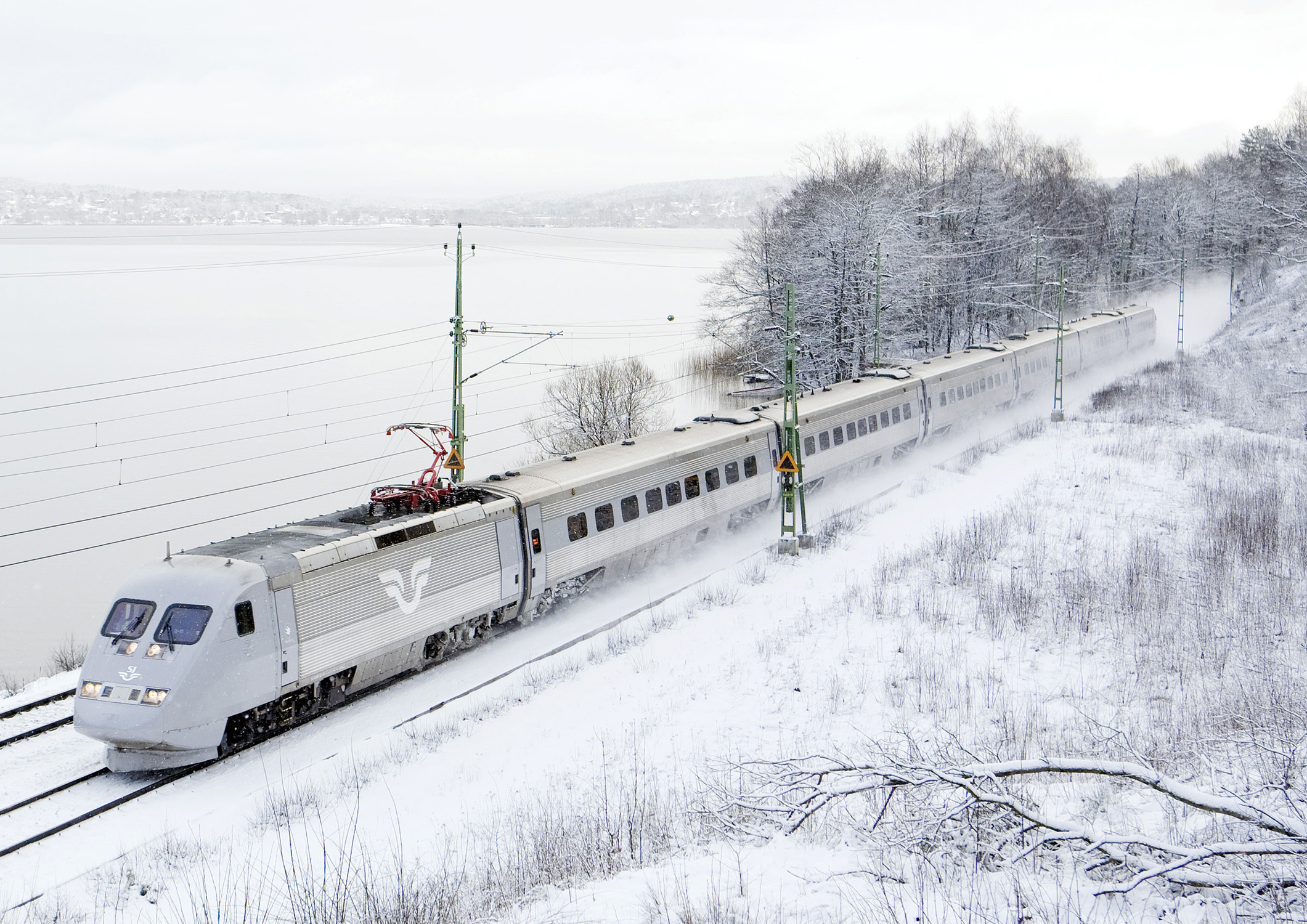
X 2000 passing through Jonsered in January 2007

The train's designated top speed is 210 km/h (130 mph). It reached 276 km/h (171 mph) during a trial run with double power car units in 1993. The maximum speed allowed in regular traffic is 200 km/h (125 mph) for safety reasons – the signalling system (and systems like the catenary) are not built for higher speeds, and it shares the track with regular trains; also, most of the lines it uses were built in the mid-to-late 19th century. The 19th century railways Stockholm–Gothenburg/Malmö are relatively straight, since they were planned the shortest way without taking intermediate cities into account, and the landscape is relatively flat. Other 19th-century railways are generally curvier.

In comparison to other high-speed trains, the X 2000 is not particularly fast; but compared to regular train services, it cuts journey time by about 10–15% – enough to make it competitive with airlines on many routes. It typically averages about 150 km/h (95 mph). The fastest part is Katrineholm–Skövde, a distance of 180 km (110 mi) that is covered in 1 hour and 2 minutes, resulting in an average speed of 174.2 km/h (108 mph).

SJ considered configuring the trainset with a sixth trailing car and creating a set of 12 trailer cars using a second locomotive. The trainset can stop in 1.1 kilometres (0.68 miles) from a top speed of 200 km/h (125 mph).

== Lines and services ==
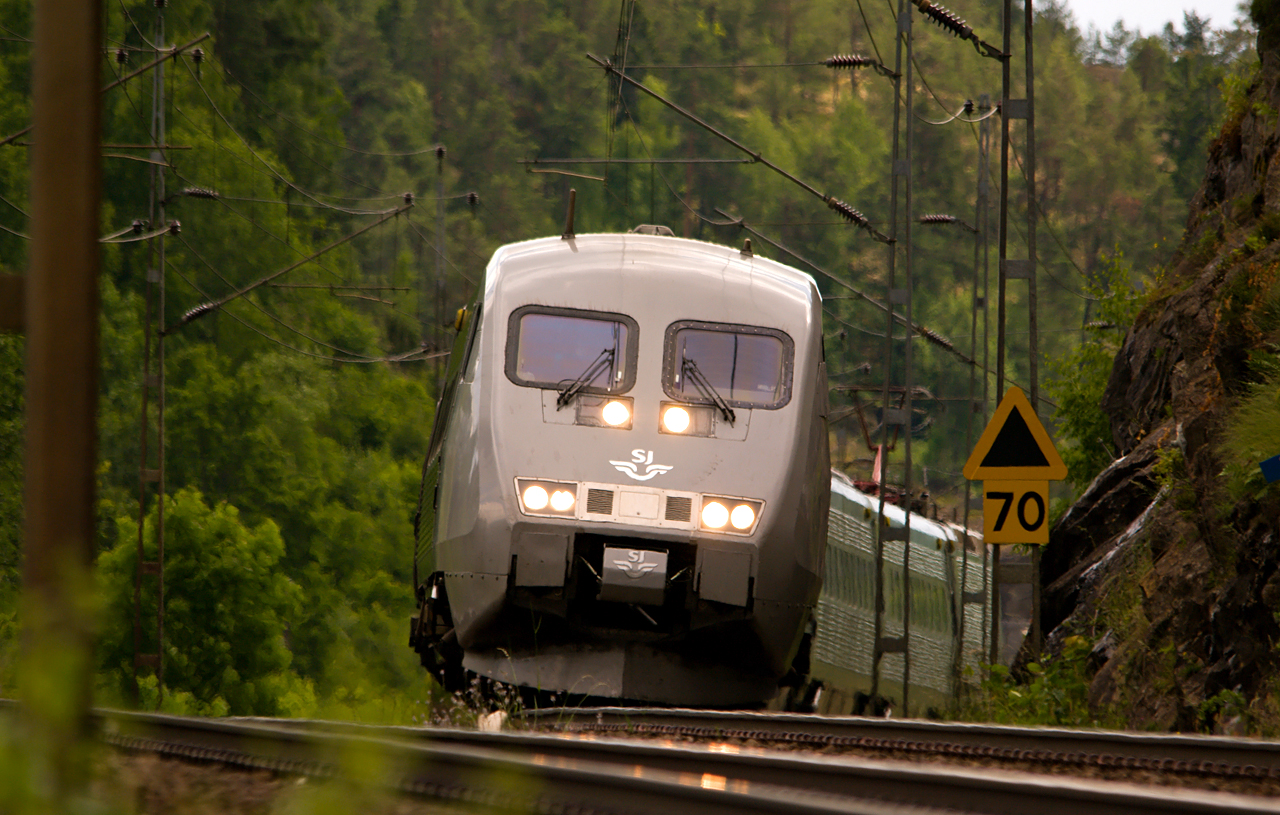
X 2000 at Graversfors in June 2011

=== Former lines and services ===
- In 2000–2004, seven trains were operated by Linx on the transeuropean route Oslo–Gothenburg–Malmö–Copenhagen and Oslo–Stockholm. Linx was a joint venture between SJ and its Norwegian counterpart NSB. It was wound up when SJ wanted to move the trains to more profitable lines in Sweden. Low-fares airlines also played a part in siphoning off passengers from the comparatively slow Linx services, the main ones taking well in excess of three hours.
- Briefly in 2010–2011 X 2000 trains ran once daily between Stockholm and Odense.
- In 2012–2013, when SJ received its X55 trains, X 2000 services were suspended on a number of routes and reduced on others.
  - One example is Stockholm–Sundsvall, with one daily departure, calling at Arlanda, Uppsala, Gävle, Söderhamn, Hudiksvall and Sundsvall. This route formerly used a single X 2000 trainset until it was replaced with X55. This is because there is since 2012 a continuation to Umeå which requires installation of ERTMS, which X 2000 does not have (as of 2025 at least).

=== Current lines and services ===
- Stockholm–Gothenburg, calling at Södertälje Syd, Katrineholm, Hallsberg, Skövde, Herrljunga, Alingsås and Gothenburg. Not all trains call at all stations. Since 2015 VR Snabbtåg Sverige (formerly MTRX) has competed with SJ on this route (previously FlixTrain as well from 2019 until 2024).
- Stockholm–Oslo, calling at Södertälje Syd, Katrineholm, Hallsberg, Degerfors, Kristinehamn, Karlstad and Arvika before crossing the border to Norway, calling at Kongsvinger and finally Oslo S. From December 2018 onward, the X 2000 trains to Oslo have been temporarily replaced with loco-hauled stock and X55 Bombardier Regina express electric multiple units due to track work in Norway. A few X 2000 trains are used in services towards Karlstad.
- Stockholm–Malmö, with many trains continuing to Copenhagen, calling at Södertälje Syd, Norrköping, Linköping, Mjölby (occasionally), Nässjö, Alvesta, Älmhult (occasionally), Hässleholm, Lund and Malmö. Services to Copenhagen also call at Copenhagen Airport, Copenhagen Central Station and Østerport (usually). For a short period during 2010–2011, there was one daily train to/from Odense.
- Gothenburg–Malmö, where one of the daily round trips uses the X 2000.

=== 2008 new high-speed trains ===
In 2008 SJ ordered 20 X55 Bombardier Regina trains with four coaches to replace the X 2000 on lines with lower demand and where its performance cannot be fully utilised (especially on lines north of Stockholm such as the Botniabanan). When these trains were delivered in 2012 and 2013 the X 2000 trains could be concentrated to fewer lines with bigger demands such as Stockholm–Malmö/Copenhagen and Stockholm–Gothenburg, using double-length X 2000 between Stockholm and Gothenburg during rush hours and weekends.

== Facilities ==
There is a bistro on board that serves snack bar–style dishes. From 1995 second class was introduced. All trains are equipped with Wi-Fi for passenger access to the Internet. The trains also have electric power supply sockets at all seats in both first and second class. The trains have been fitted with repeaters to improve mobile phone reception.

== Appearance and renovations ==
=== Original appearance ===
In its original appearance, the X 2000's carriages, constructed from stainless steel, were partially painted with blue and dark grey stripes. The rounded fronts, made from fiberglass-reinforced plastic, were painted white.

Original appearance

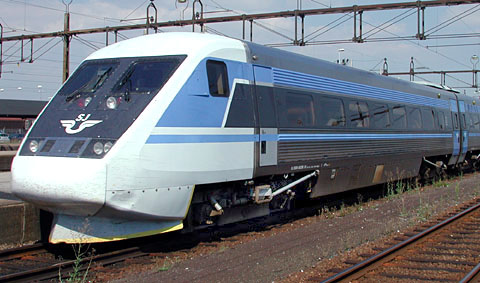

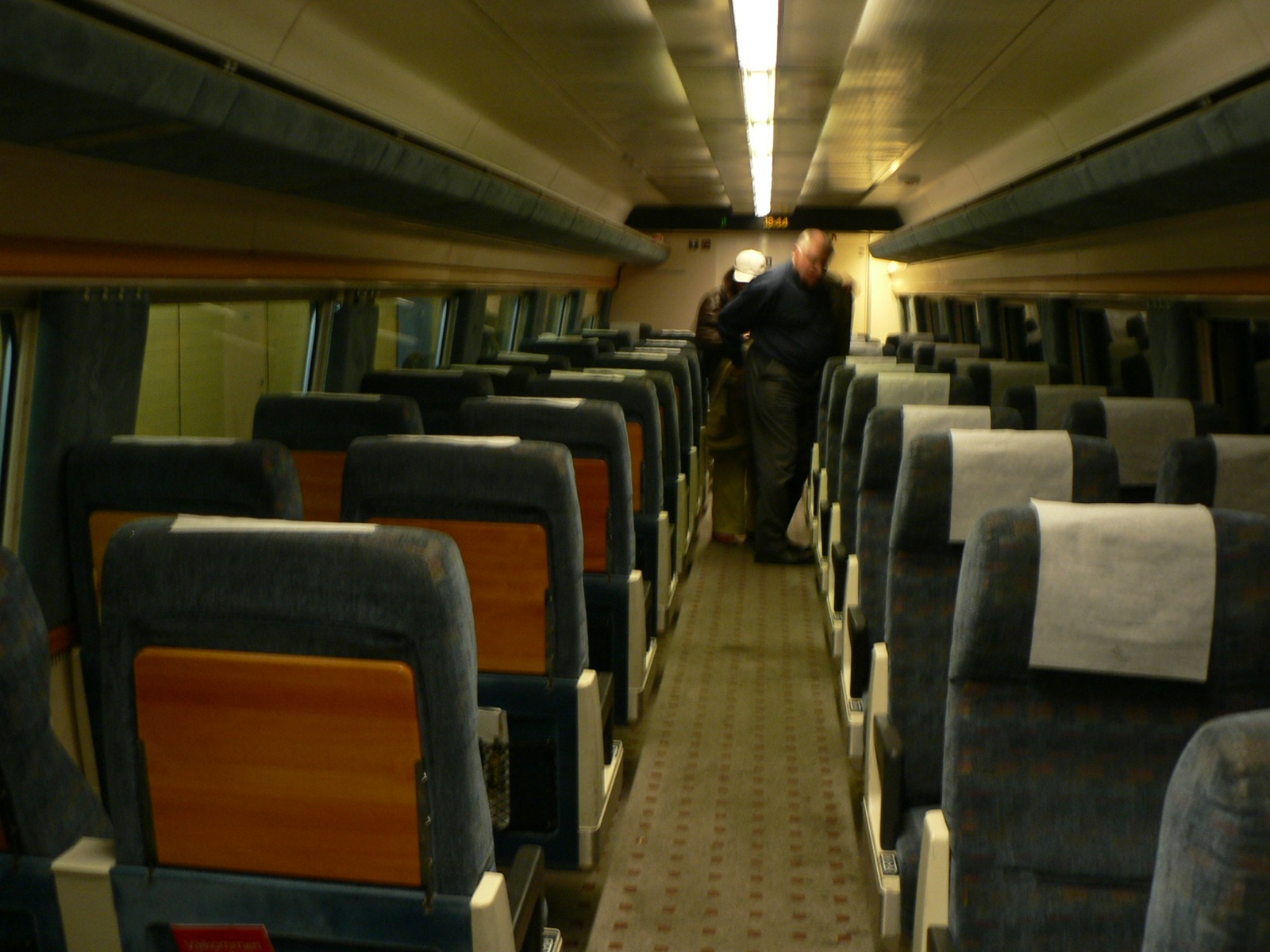

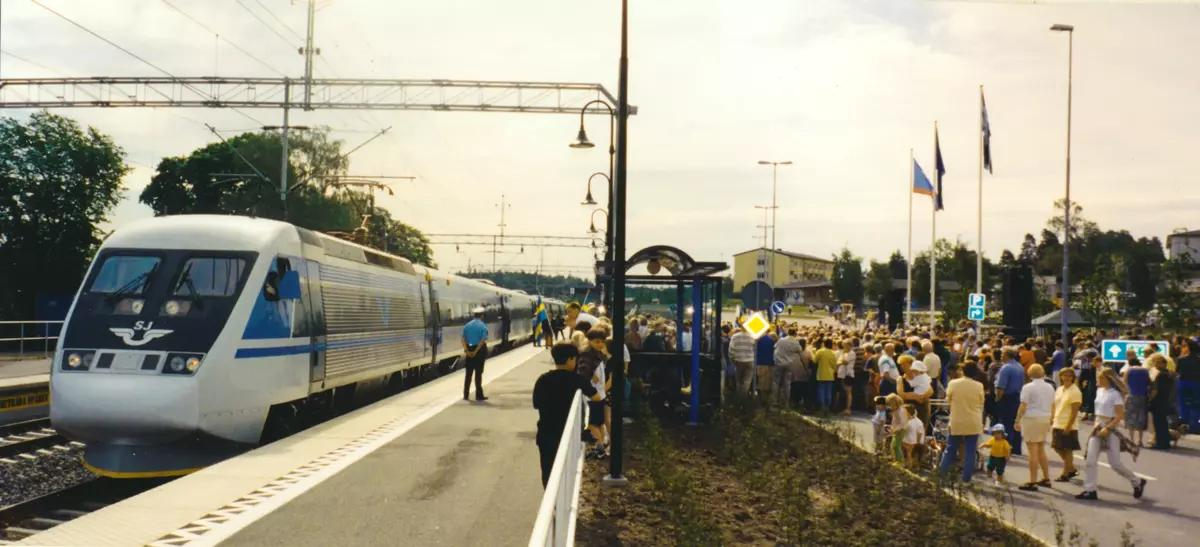

=== First renovation ===
Around 2005, the X 2000 underwent its first major renovation. During this update, electrical outlets were added to each seat, the upholstery was replaced, and the trains were equipped with Wi-Fi. The exterior was also repainted in grey, which became the standard look for most SJ trains.

Appearance after first renovation

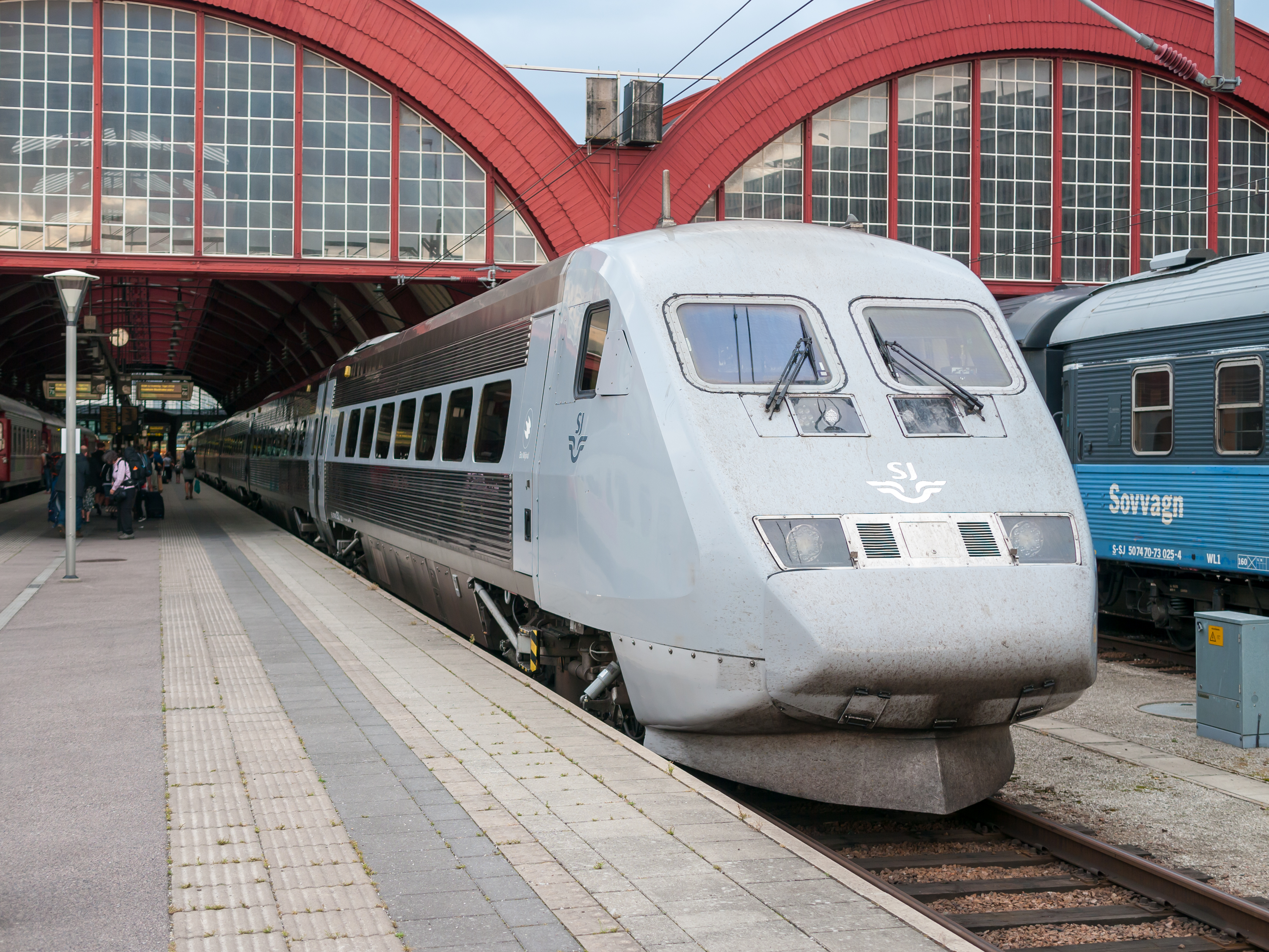

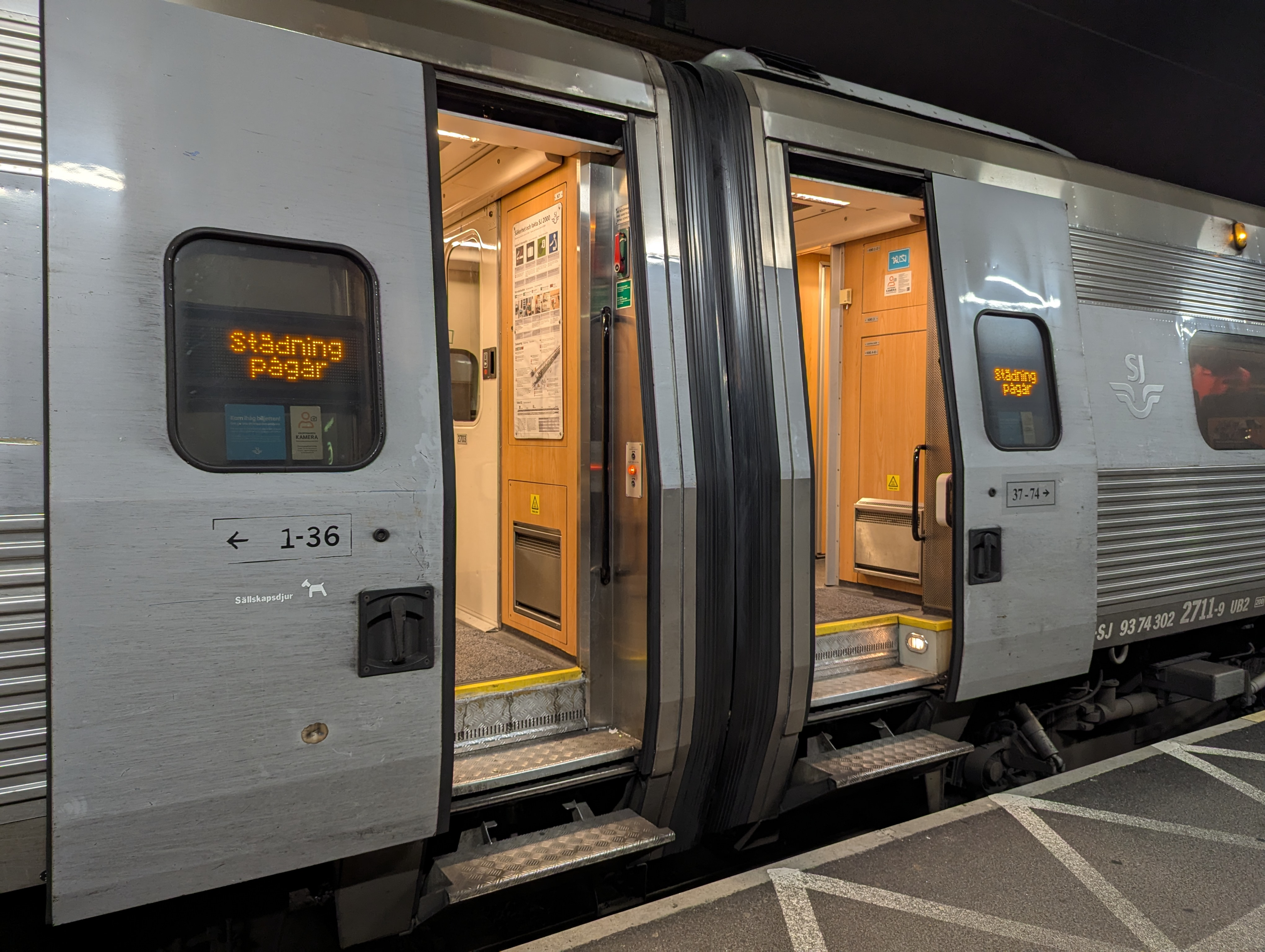

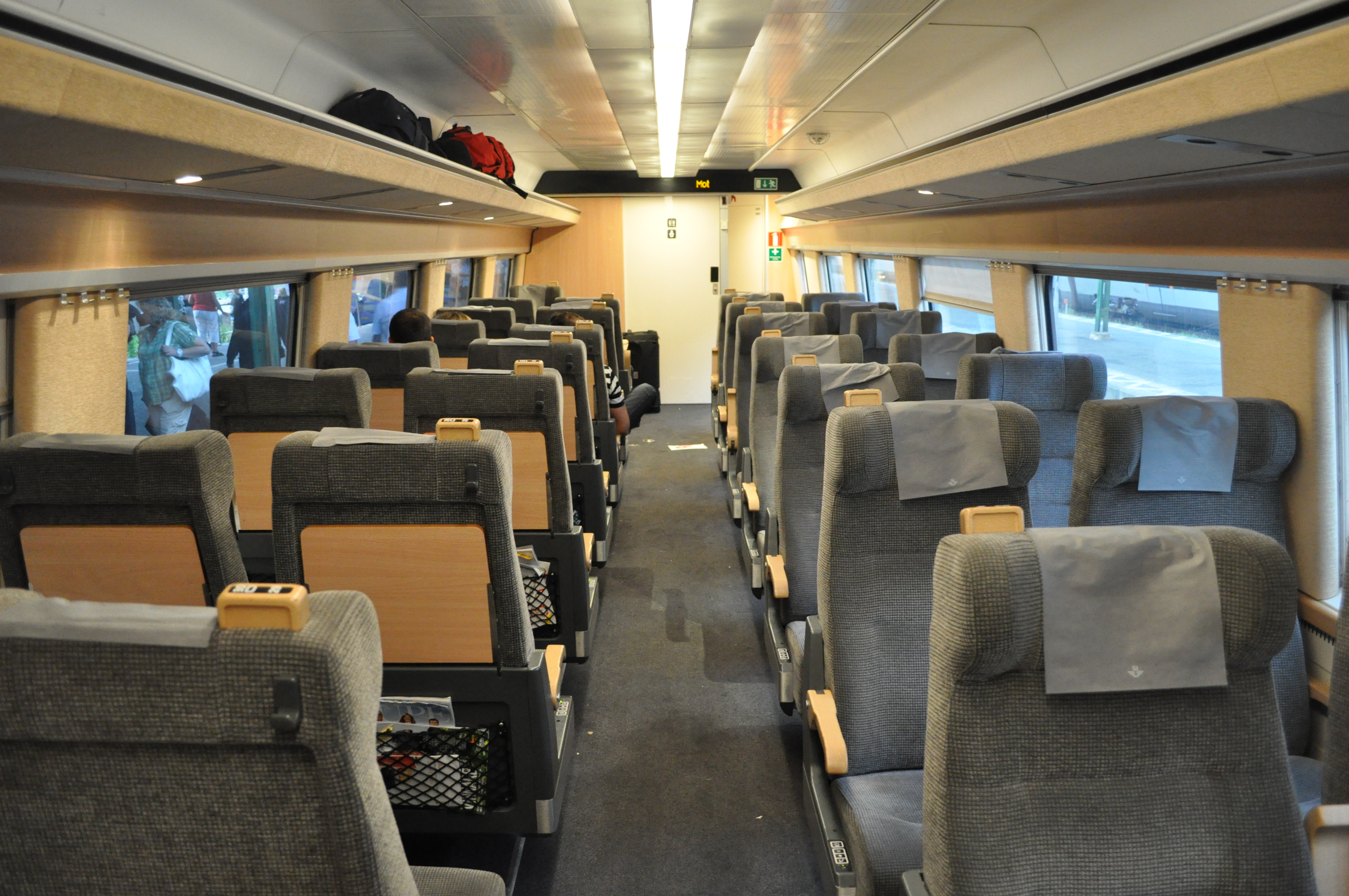

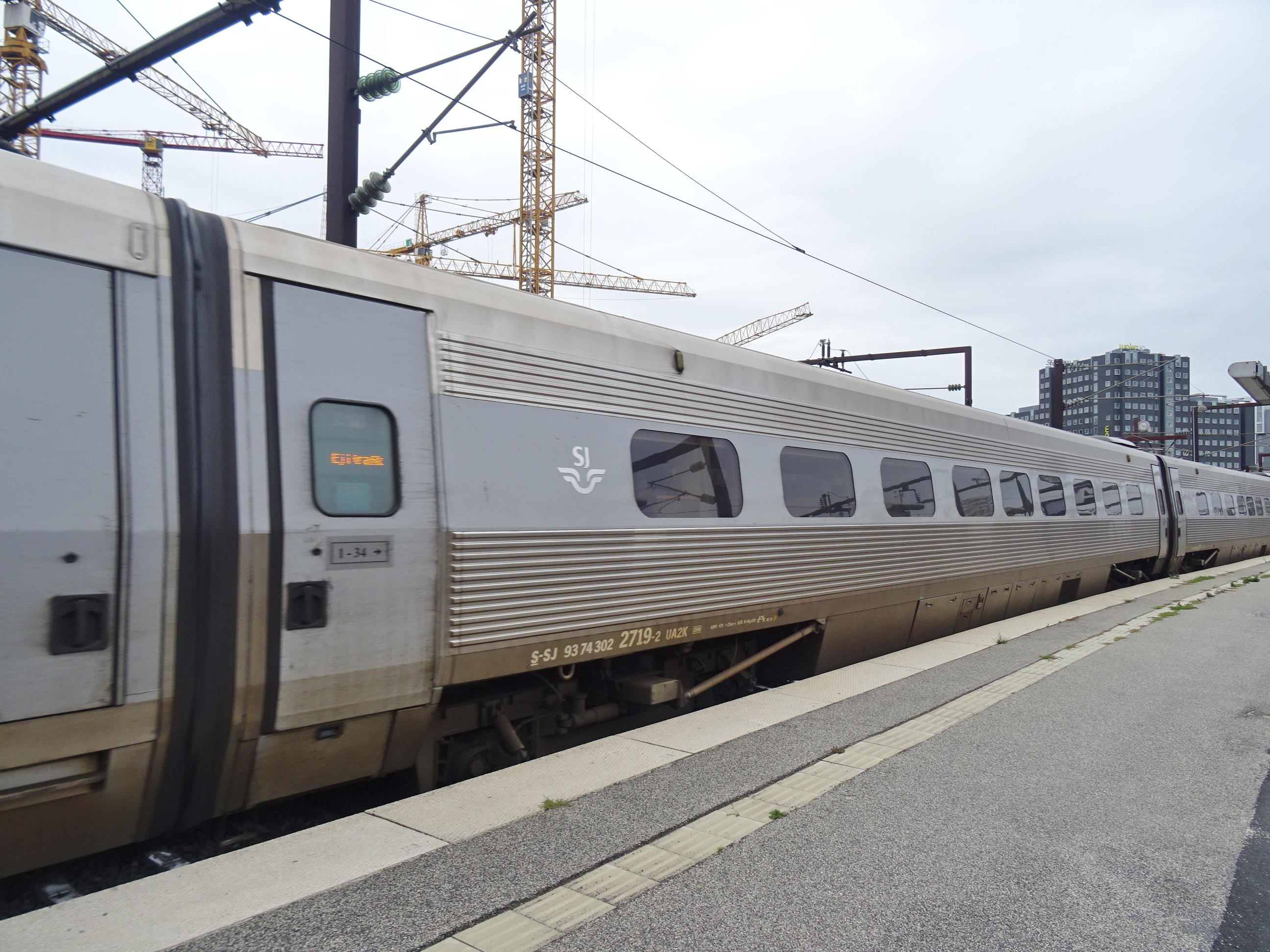

=== Second renovation ===
In January 2014, SJ announced that it was to invest 3.5 billion SEK in the modernisation and repowering of its X 2000 fleet, in order to extend the life of the trains by 20–25 years. SJ stated that the refurbishment of the trains would cost one third of the price of replacing them with new trains, whilst also having a reduced environmental impact.

ABB, whose predecessor ASEA designed and built the trains, were awarded the contract to replace the trains' traction converters, transformers, battery chargers, train control systems, and passenger information and entertainment equipment.

Additionally to the technical improvements, the new refurbished X 2000s feature a new livery with a dark grey front, as well as a rebuilt interior with new seats allowing for 15% higher seating capacity, new walls, ceilings, floors and lighting, and a rebuilt bistro. The new interiors were awarded a Red Dot Design Award in 2020, with the jury stating:

"With its perfectly harmonised colours and materials, the interior for the SJ X2000 [sic] high-speed train creates a particularly pleasant atmosphere. The elaboration in detail and the lighting concept create a peaceful ambience in the train compartment."

The refurbished trains were originally scheduled to start introduction in 2019, however the first refurbished set started operation in November 2021. As of July 2025, only 9 out of the 36 trainsets had been refurbished. As of September 2026, 14 out of the 36 trainsets had been refurbished.

Appearance after second renovation

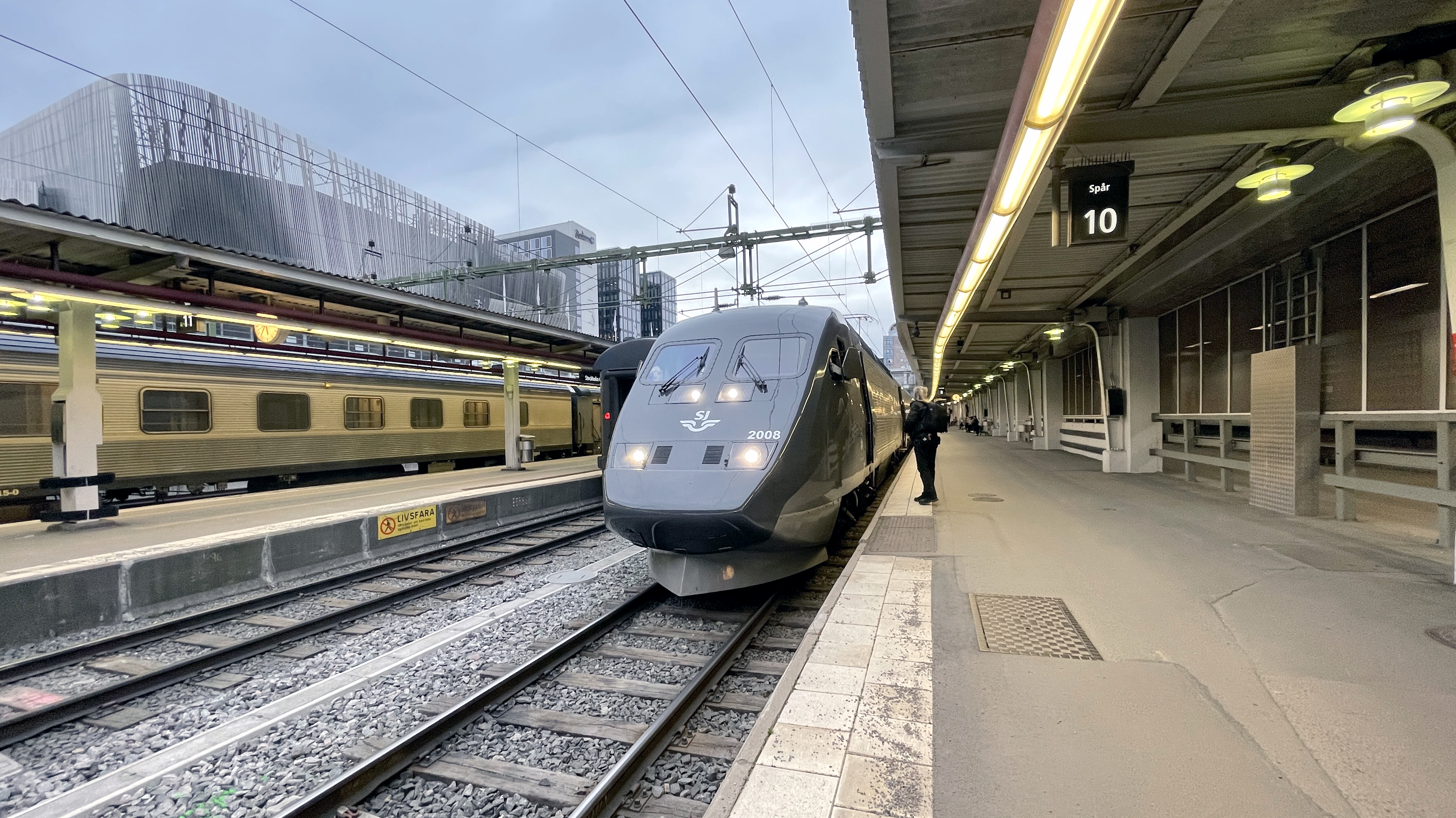

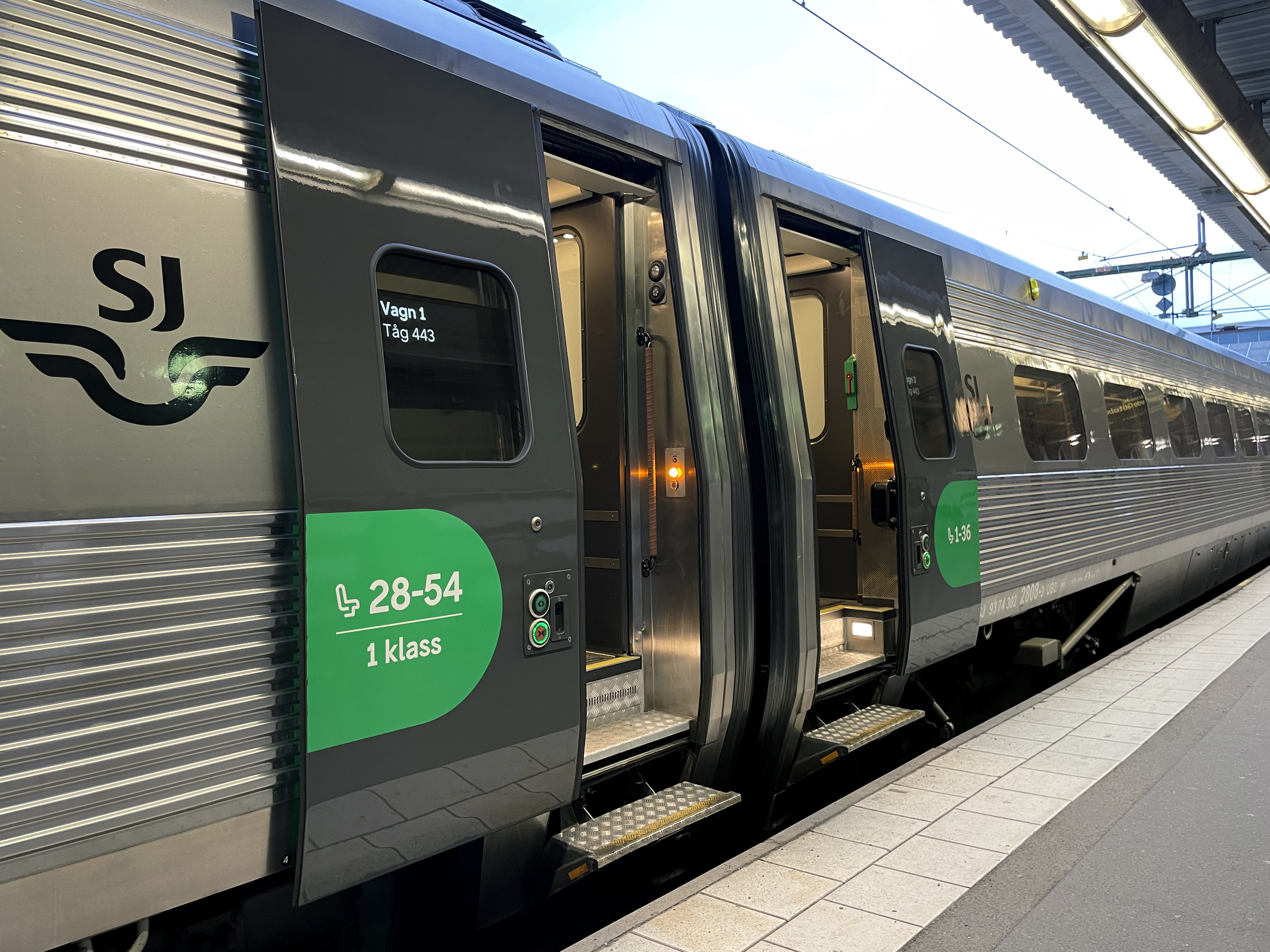

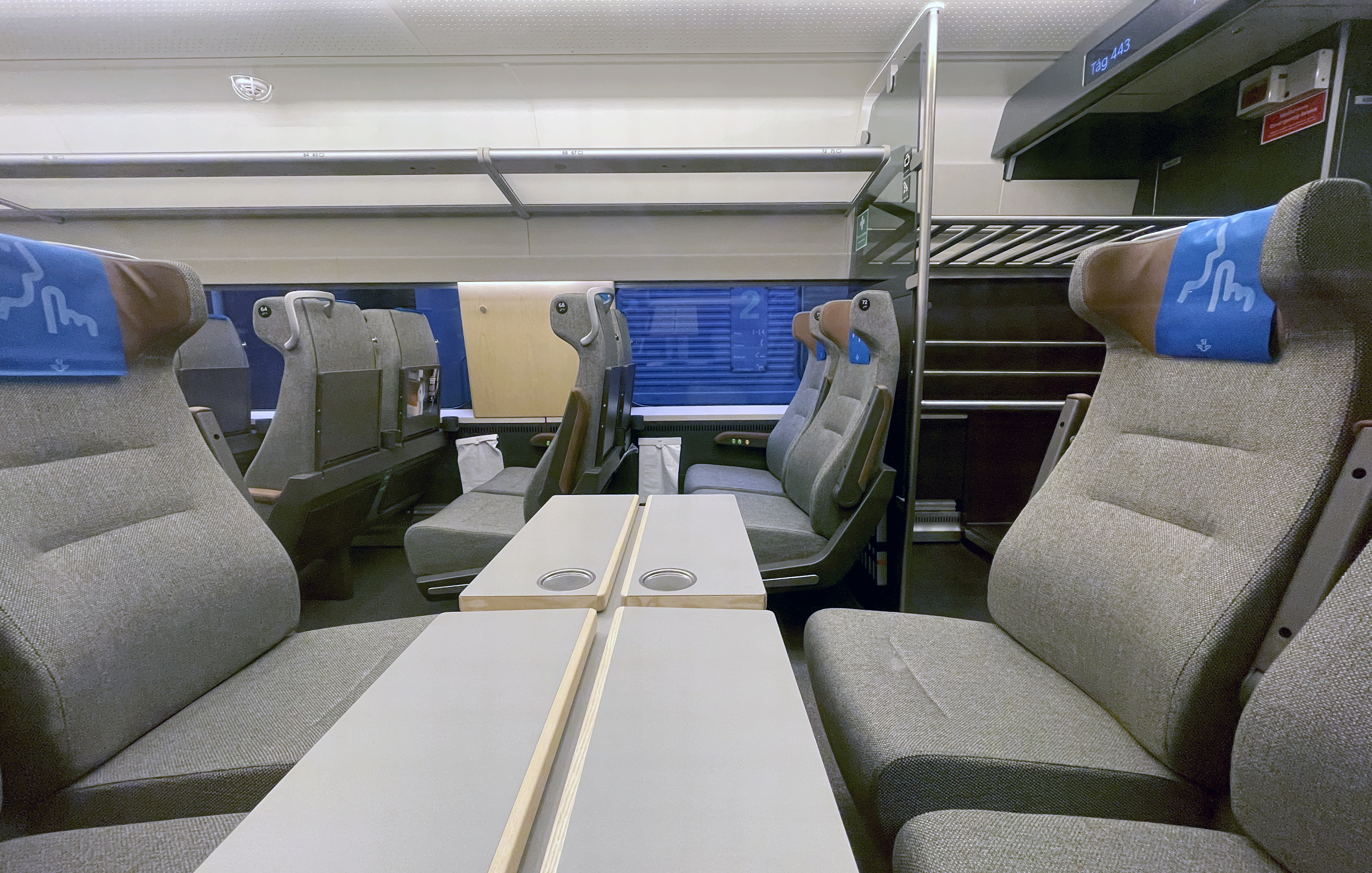

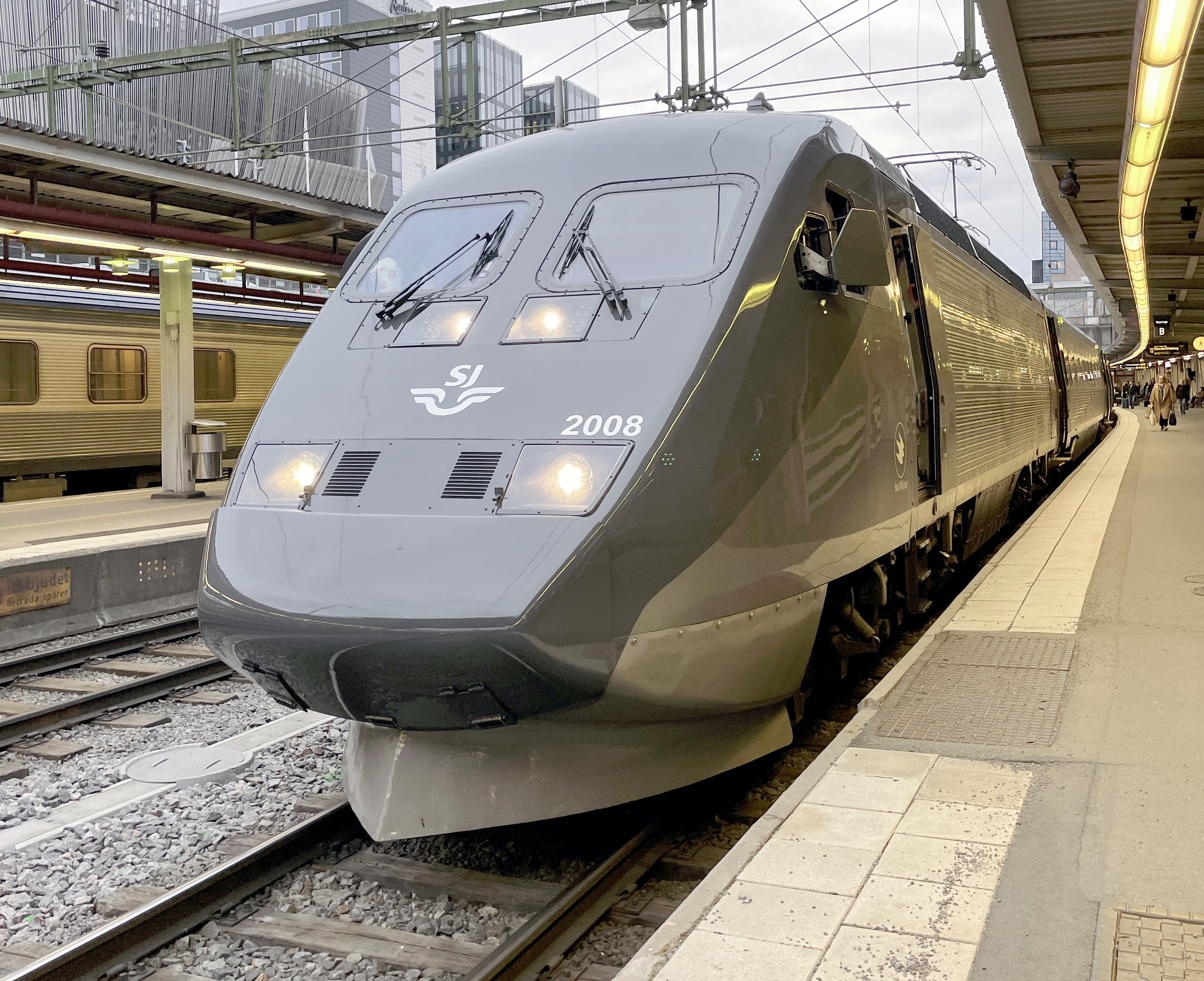

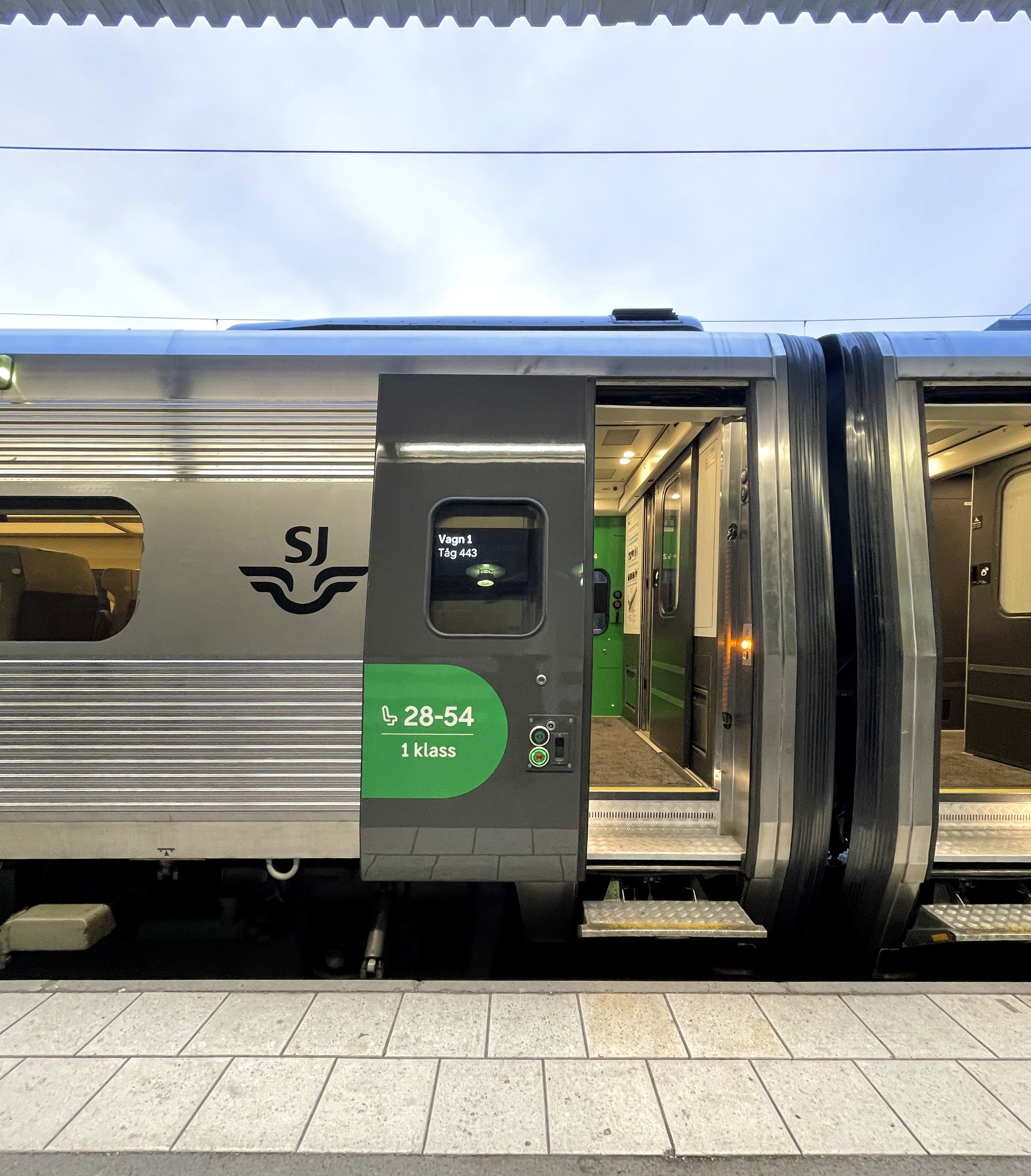

== Effect on the railway ==
The train has had a major effect on SJ and the country's railway. More passengers, together with the lower operating costs associated with operating trains faster and more efficiently, helped SJ become profitable.

It also proved to Swedes that rail is a viable solution not just in exotic densely populated foreign countries, but also at home in Sweden. In 1991, the Swedish government started a massive investment program, spending 5–10 billion kronor annually on improvements to the rail network. The program continues today. A milestone was reached in the late 1990s when the number of trips taken by train in Sweden exceeded the 1940s level for the first time.

New links built since 1990 include the Øresund Bridge, the Arlanda Airport link, Södertälje–Huddinge, Söderhamn–Enånger, Varberg–Kungsbacka and Helsingborg–Lund. The X 2000 train contributed to building public support for these large projects.

However, between 2000–2008, the Stockholm–Malmö routing became increasingly congested due to an increase in traffic on that routing - a mix of fast express trains, slower stopping trains and freight trains - to the point that the fastest 2008 services averaged 21min longer than the fastest 2000 services.

== Exports ==
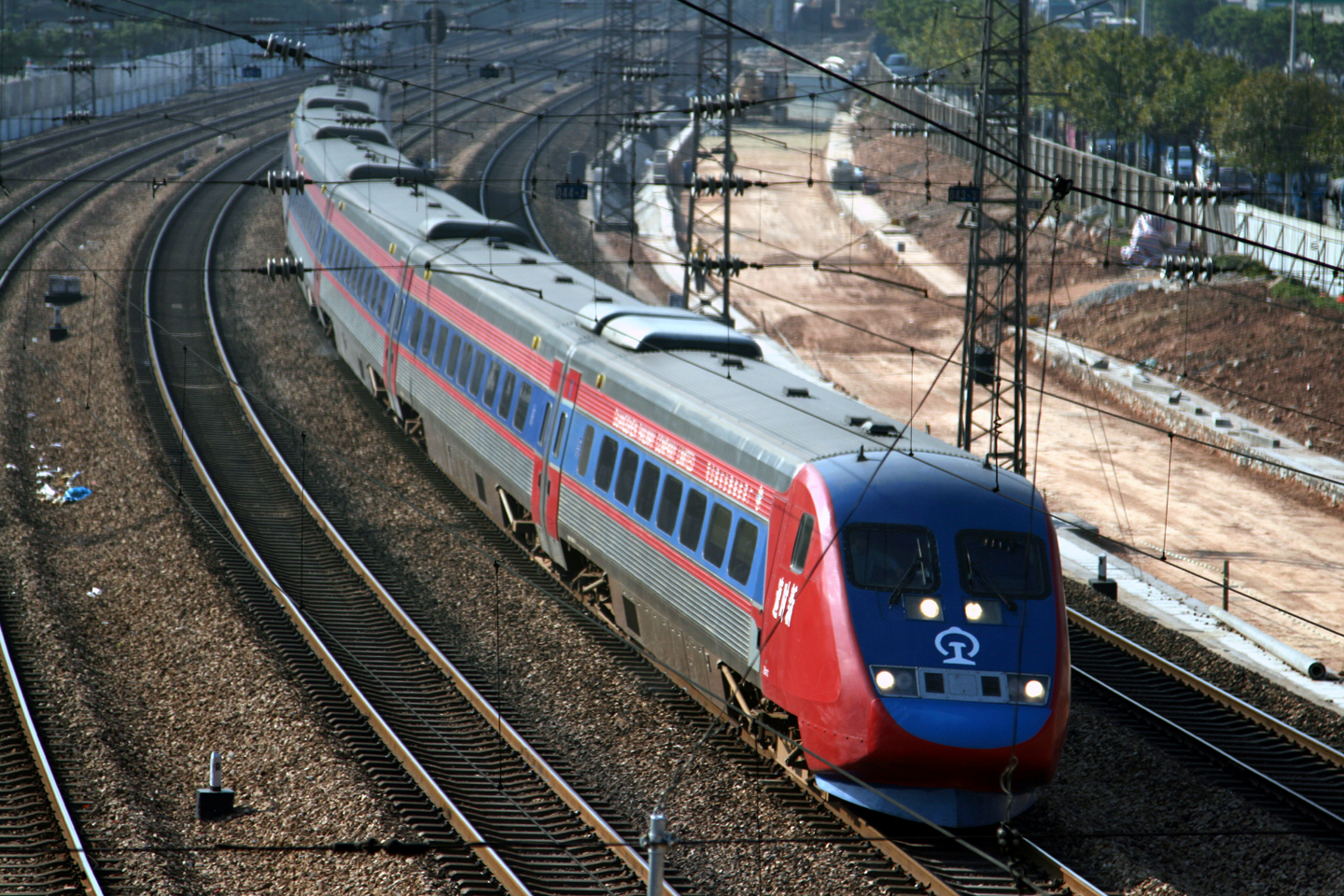
Guangshen Railway Company X 2000 in China in 2006

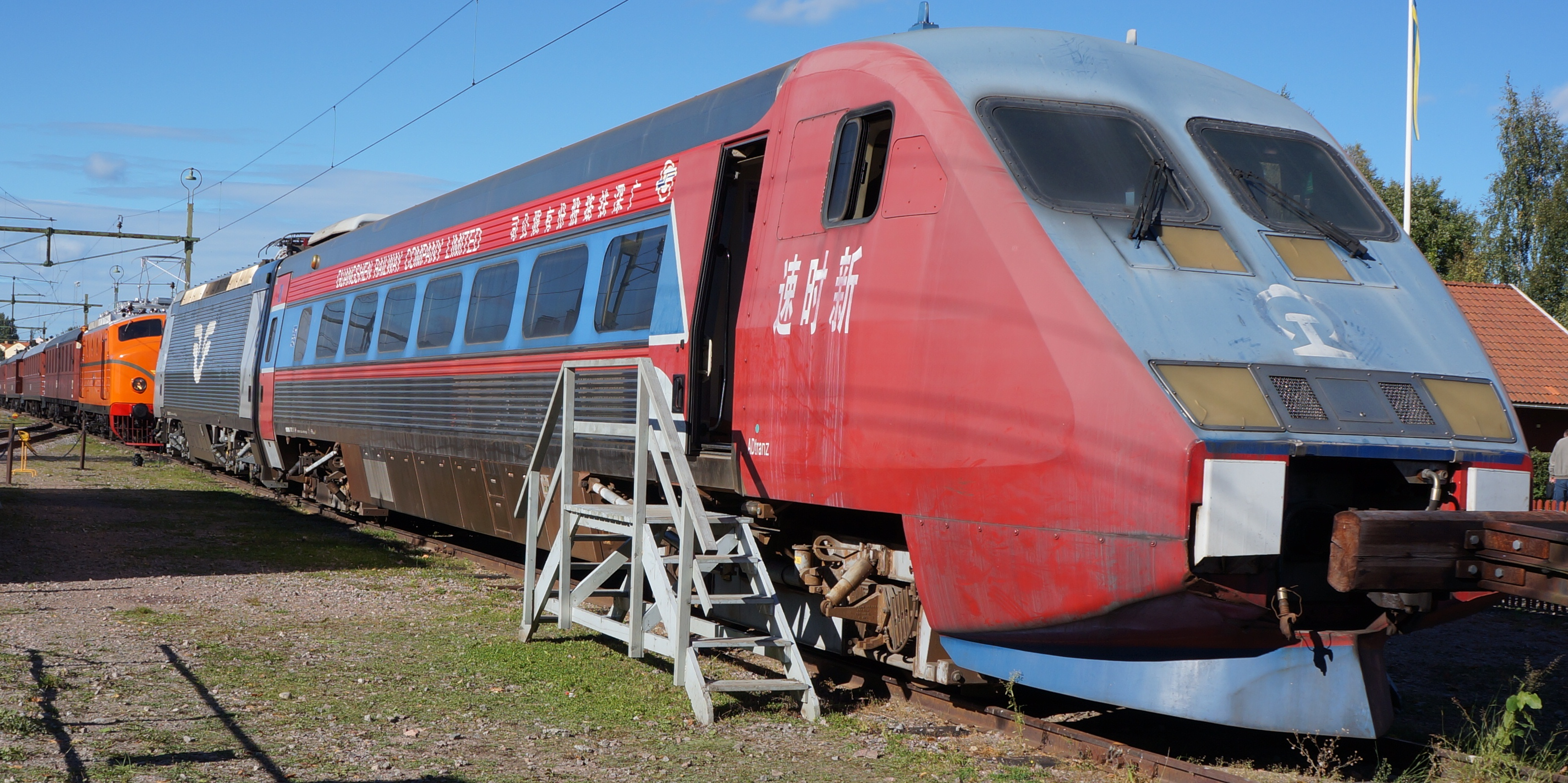
Preserved Guangshen Railway Company cab car 110986 at the Swedish Railway Museum in September 2012

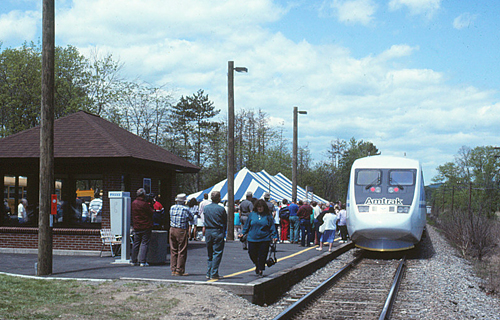
X2000 leased by Amtrak at Ticonderoga station, New York.

The manufacturer of the X 2000 had tried to sell the train to countries other than Sweden, but with little success. In connection with the sales attempts the train was tested and demonstrated in some countries. Norway, Finland, Germany, Austria, France, China, Australia, Portugal and the US were mentioned as candidates.

An X 2000 toured the United States in 1992–1993 on lease to Amtrak. It was tested by Amtrak from October 1992 until January 1993. It was used in revenue service on the Northeast Corridor between New Haven, CT and Washington, D.C., via New York City, for about five months, from February until May and from August until September 1993. From May until July it was taken on a national tour around the 48 continental states for demonstration stops at significant stations. It also briefly toured parts of Canada in collaboration with CP Rail in July 1993 before being returned to Amtrak.

In 1995, three X 2000 cars (SJ2819, SJ2620 and SJ2520) were hired by Australian operator CountryLink for evaluation purposes, being one driving trailer, one bistro car and one first class car. The trains were towed in a push/pull mode by modified XPT power cars XP2000 and XP2009. After conducting a statewide tour of New South Wales in March 1995, they were used on Sydney to Canberra services from April to June 1995. The X2 was also tested in Norway and Germany. There were competitors which had lower prices, including Pendolino and ICE T.

The Guangshen Railway Company in China leased and later purchased outright an X 2000 train which it named Xinshisu (New Speed). The train served as Guangzhou–Kowloon through train from 1998 until 2007 when it was replaced by locomotive hauled coaches. The train was initially supposed to have been given the number 2044, but due to the fact that the number "4" sounds similar to the word for "death" in the Chinese language, it was renumbered as 2088, of which the number "8" symbolises luck in Chinese culture. It was delivered to Sichuan Province in August 2007. Due to the 2008 Sichuan earthquake, Chengdu Railway Bureau needed to rebuild the railway networks in Sichuan Province. Also, the authority could not carry the maintenance costs of the train. It was therefore returned to the Guangshen Railway Company in late December 2008. In 2012 the train was purchased by SJ and repatriated back to Sweden. The train had some serious damage and deferred maintenance. The cab car (110986 CUB2XFK) has been cosmetically restored and repainted, losing its Chinese livery, and will be displayed at the Swedish Railway Museum when it reopens. The five intermediate trailers were refurbished and re-entered service in 2020, with the power car (2088 CX2) following in September 2025 under its new designation X2EK. This new designation indicates the installation of ETCS equipment and the ability to run in Denmark, though approval for that is still pending.

== Technical ==
The X2 was designed for old main lines with tight curves and with continuously welded rails (the train has a maximum axle load of 17 tonnes (16.7 long tons; 18.7 short tons), which causes large forces on the track). However, since 1990 a lot of new high speed lines have been constructed in Sweden, both upgraded lines and new lines. These upgraded or new lines always have ATC, continuously welded rails on concrete sleepers and no crossings with road and rail at the same level. The tilting function is not used on these lines.

The max power continuous output of the power car is 3,260 kW (4,370 hp), which is comparatively low for a fast train. It also enabled SJ to say that it does not consume more power at 200 km/h (125 mph) than older Rc-locomotive hauled trains at 130 km/h (80 mph).

The X2 trains have mostly run at the X 2000 service level, but have periodically been used for Linx traffic (2000–2004) as well as regional services, for which fewer coaches were used to improve acceleration. All X2 trains are maintained at Hagalund depot in Stockholm and Olskroken depot located just before Gothenburg Central Station.

Technical data X2 power car

General
Operator	SJ
Manufacturing year	1989–1998
Number of manuf.	43
Supplier mechanical part	Kalmar Verkstad
Supplier electrical part	ABB
Axle arr	Bo-Bo
Weight	73 t
Axle load	17.5 t
Max tractive eff	160 kN
Max speed	210 km/h
Body
Length	17.6 m
Body length	16.98 m
Bogie distance	8.98 m
Height over pantograph	
Body width	
Coupling	automatic
Surface	corrugated stainless steel
Colour	silver
Bogies
Track gauge	1,435 mm Standard gauge
Axle distance	2.90 m
Wheel diameter, new	1,100 mm
Primary suspension	rubber pad
Secondary suspension	coil
Brake	shoe, regenerative
Bogie Weight	NA
Min hor radius	NA
Electrical equipment
Catenary voltage	15 kV / 25 kV (dual voltage variants)
Catenary frequency	16 2/3 Hz / 50 Hz (dual voltage variants)
Max cont power	3.26 MW
Traction motor	MJA 385-2
Max power trainheating	360 kW

Technical data X2 passenger coaches

	UA2	UB2	URB2	UBX2
General
Operator	SJ			
Manufacturer	Kalmar Verkstad, ABB			
Manufacturing year	1989–?			
Manufacturing country	Sweden			
Number of manufact	NA			
Type of coach	first class saloon	second class saloon	second class saloon + bistro	second class saloon + driver's cab
Tare Weight	47 t	47 t	49 t	55 t
Max allow. speed	200 km/h			
Body
Length	24.95 m			22.6 m
Body length	24.40 m			21.98 m
Bogie distance	17.70 m			14.50 m
Body height	3.82 m			
Body width	3.05 m			
Floor height	1.26 m			
Body material	stainless steel			
Type of coupling				
Colour	silver			
Type of entrance door	slide door, plug			
Bogies
Bogie Mark	NA			
Track gauge	1,435 mm			
Axle distance	2.90 m			
Wheel diameter- new	880 mm			
Primary suspension	rubber pad			
Secondary suspension	air			
Brake	disk & magnetic rail			
No of disks per axle	2			
Bogie weight	NA			
Electrical equipment
Train heating voltage	3 × 380 V, 50 Hz			
No of phases	3			
Air conditioning	yes			
Interior
Floor plan	saloon			saloon + driver's cab
No of seats (before renovation)	51 seats	72 seats	28 seats + 18 bistro seats	41 seats
No of seats (after renovation)	54 seats	74 seats	28 seats + 16 bistro seats	40 seats
Seats abreast	2 + 1	2 + 2		
Seat distance	105 cm	95 cm		

Each train also has a UB2X coach with a driver's place, and a URB2 coach with a simple restaurant.

In the beginning there were many more UA2 first class coaches than UB2 second class coaches. But after a decision that state employees should normally use second class for train journeys in their works instead of first class, something many companies followed, many UA2 have been rebuilt into UB2.

== See also ==
- Rail transport in Europe
- High-speed rail in Europe
