= SJ X5 =

X5 / X8 / X15
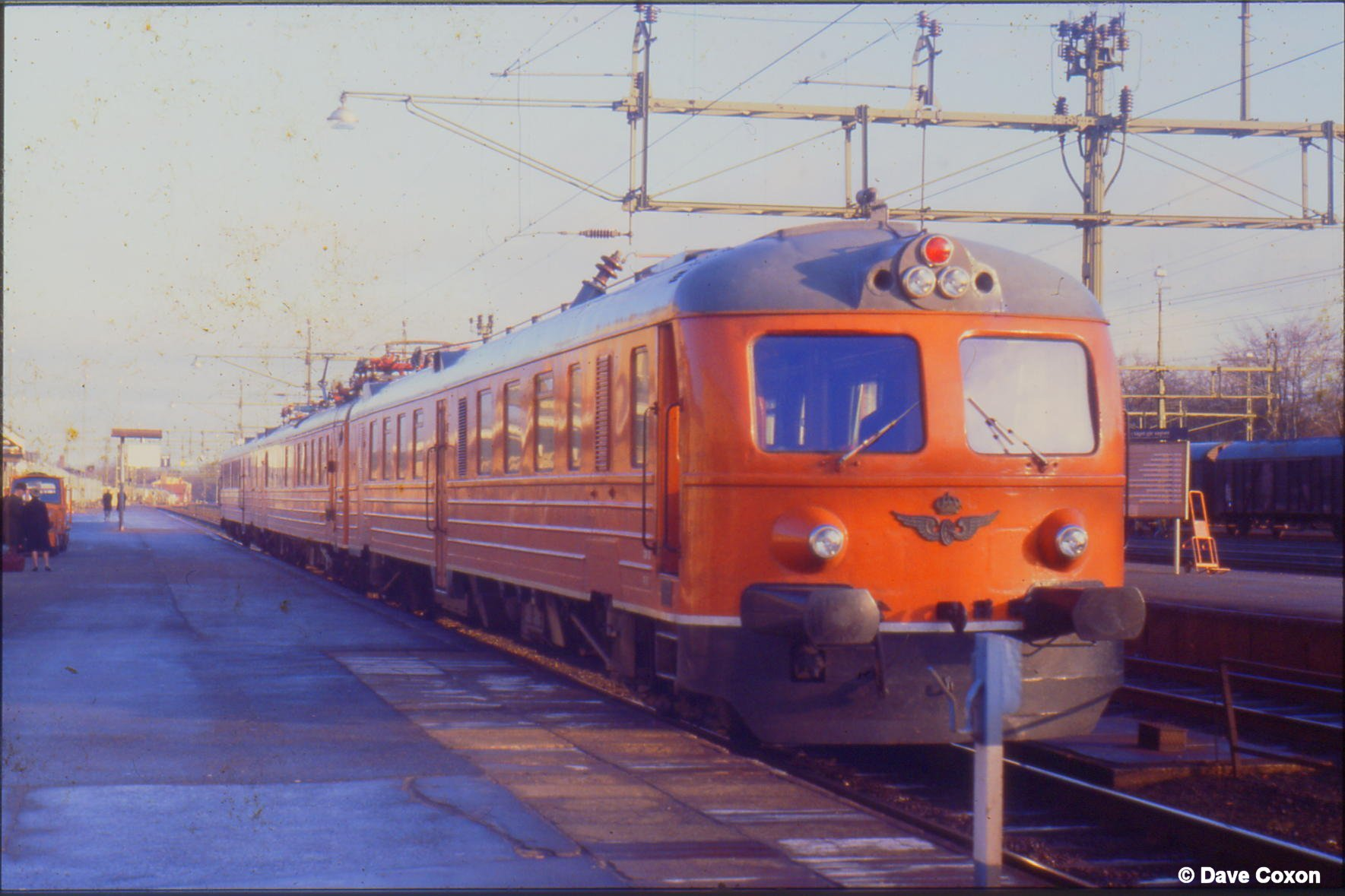
- X15 set at Skövde after a high-speed pantograph test run from Moholm in November 1979
- In service: 1947–1983
- Manufacturer: ASEA
- Constructed: 1947–1948
- Formation: Three cars
- Fleet numbers: 216–221 (X5); 253–254 (X8)
- Operators: Statens Järnvägar

Specifications
- Train length: 72,200 mm (236 ft 10.5 in) (X5); 87,610 mm (287 ft 5.2 in) (X8)
- Maximum speed: 135 km/h (84 mph)
- Weight: 135.6 t (133.5 long tons; 149.5 short tons) (X5); 167.3 t (164.7 long tons; 184.4 short tons) (X8)
- Power output: 1,000 kW (1,300 hp)
- Electric system(s): 15 kV 16.7 Hz AC catenary
- Current collection: Pantograph
- Track gauge: 1,435 mm (4 ft 8 1/2 in)

X5, X8 and X15 was a series of three or four car electric multiple units operated by Statens Järnvägar (SJ) of Sweden as express trains. Eight units were built by Allmänna Svenska Elektriska Aktiebolaget (ASEA) in 1947–48 and were in service until 1985.

== History ==
The first delivery was of two four-car units to Bergslagernas Järnvägar (BJ) in 1947, designated X8, followed by the delivery of six three-car units to SJ in 1948, designated X5. By 1949 BJ was taken over by SJ, who operated all the units. They were used by BJ on the route Gothenburg–Dalarna–Gävle on the GDG Express. SJ put their units into the main express routes, including Skandiapilen (Köpenhamn–Helsingborg–Göteborg–Oslo), Göteborgaren (Göteborg–Stockholm) and Mälardalen (Stockholm–Västerås–Örebro).

During the 1970s the X5s and X8s were moved to regional services around Göteborg. Last regular traffic was in 1983 while one X5 remained as a reserve train until 1987. Two X5 units have been preserved, though neither are operational.

== Variations ==
X5 was the second batch, with six units delivered to SJ, with three cars.

X8 was the first batch, with two units delivered to BJ. The extra fourth car was a dining car. Neither have been preserved.

X15 was a test unit for a new generation of high-speed trains, leading to the development of the X2. The X15 consisted of three converted X5 carriages with new motors, bogies and tilting technology, and later on one streamlined corrugated stainless steel carriage that could be described as a prototype of a typical X2 carriage was added. It reached the contemporary Swedish speed record of 238 km/h. The three converted X5 carriages were scrapped in 1990, while the prototype X2 carriage was used as a measuring car for a number of years until it was moved to Nykroppa and converted to a firefighting car in 2008.
