= Kalmar Verkstad =

Swedish vehicle manufacturer

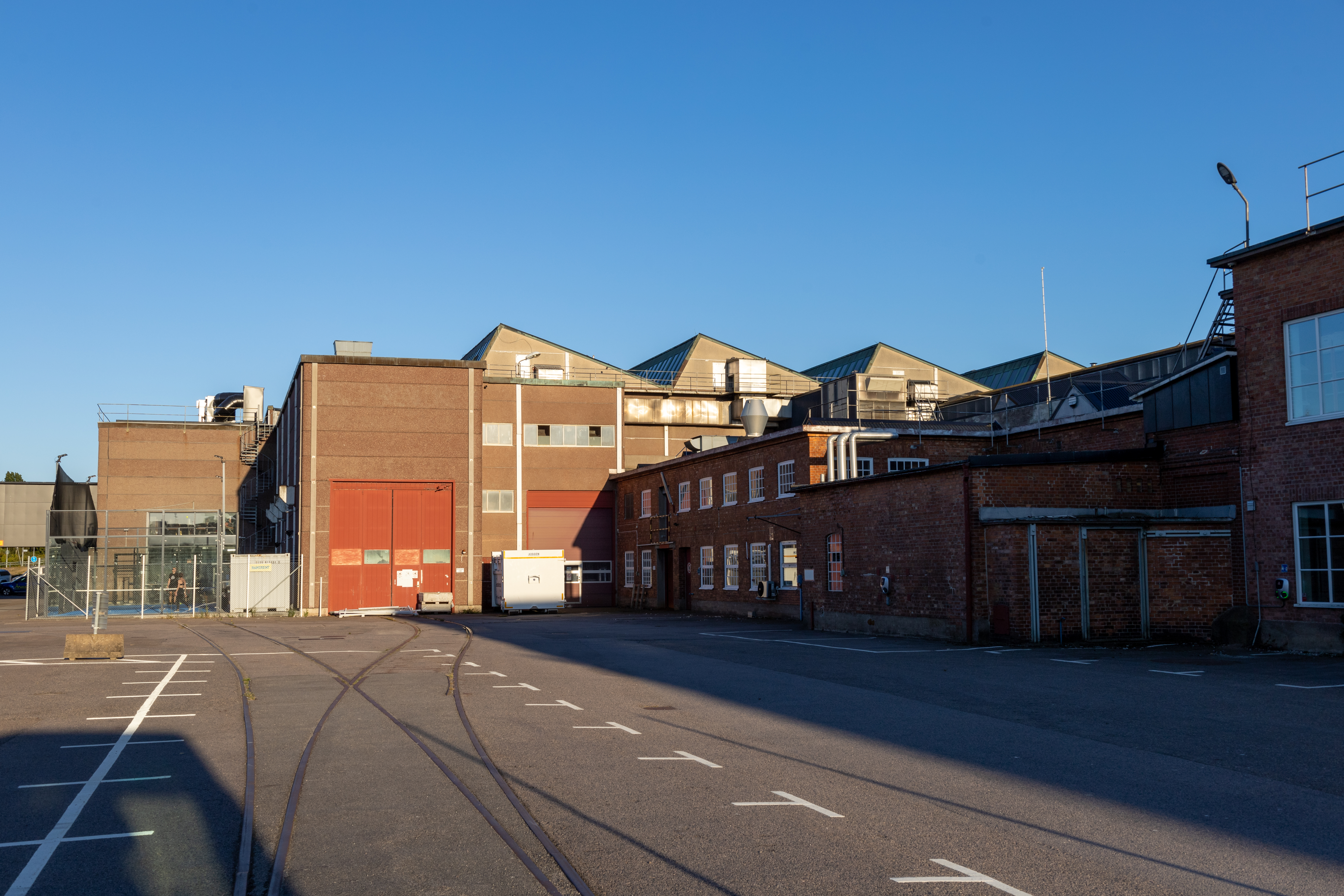
- Kalmar Verkstad in 2022
- Type: Subsidiary
- Industry: Rail transport
- Founded: 1902; 124 years ago
- Defunct: 1990
- Fate: Sold to ABB
- Headquarters: Kalmar, Sweden
- Area served: Worldwide
- Products: Locomotives; High-speed trains Intercity and commuter trains Trams; People movers Signalling systems

Kalmar Verkstad AB (KVAB) was a Swedish train and automobile manufacturer in Kalmar, Sweden, that made the Tjorven and Terminal. KVAB was founded in 1902 and acquired by ABB in 1990, with the train manufacturing eventually becoming owned by Bombardier, which closed the factory in Kalmar in 2005.

== History and products ==
KVAB's core business was trains, and they built all kinds of locomotives, trams, passenger cars, freight cars for both Swedish market and export.

In the mid-sixties, KVAB also produced small trucks, boats, parking decks and cars for road use. Tjorven was a small delivery van based on the DAF 44, Postverket placed an initial order of 1000 vehicles.

Kalmar Terminal was a vehicle intended to be used for transporting goods in ports between ships and railway. One odd detail was that the door was located in the front. It had a V8 diesel engine, automatic gearbox, and semi-trailer coupling with built-in automatic air and electric connections. At forklift was mounted at the rear, so the truck driver could load and unload goods from the trailer.

== Products ==
- Y1 (railcar)
- BM2
- Regina
- Öresundståg
- X2
- SL C20
- BM 73b
- BM 73a
- Flytoget
- Tjorven, aka Kalmar KVD440/441 or DAF Kalmar
