= SJAB =

SJAB may refer to:

- SJ AB, a Swedish passenger train operator
- St John Ambulance Brigade, one of two traditional divisions of the first-aid charity St John Ambulance
