= Max Hamburgers =

Swedish fast food company

Max Burgers Aktiebolag
- Type: Privately held company
- Industry: Restaurants
- Founded: 1968; 58 years ago in Gällivare, Sweden
- Headquarters: Luleå, Sweden
- Area served: Sweden; Norway; Denmark; Poland
- Key people: Richard Bergfors, Chairman/CEO
- Products: Burgers and other fast food
- Revenue: ▲4.1 billion SEK (2021)
- Number of employees: 7400 (2022)
- Website: www.maxburgers.com

Max, formally Max Burgers Aktiebolag, is a Swedish hamburger chain founded in 1968 in Gällivare. As of 2024, the hamburger chain had 155 restaurants in Sweden, 26 restaurants in Poland, eight in Norway and six in Denmark. The company had seven in Egypt operated through franchising. From 2012 to 2018, Max also operated in the United Arab Emirates, also through franchising. The company has approximately 6,500 employees and is owned and operated by the family of Curt Bergfors, its co-founder.

== History ==
The chain was founded by Britta Fredriksson and Curt Bergfors (1949–2022) in Gällivare, Sweden, in 1968. Bergfors' oldest son Richard Bergfors is the current president since 2002.

Until the 1980s, Max was the largest hamburger restaurant chain in northern Sweden, with only a single restaurant outside of Norrland (on Drottninggatan, Stockholm). This changed during the 1990s, when they expanded to become a nationwide fast-food chain. By 2011, there were around 85 restaurants in Sweden, compared to just 40 five years earlier.

From 2005 to 2010, Max expanded extensively to the western parts of Sweden, and in 2010, plans were announced to expand to Riyadh, Egypt and Dubai with Kuwait following. Three years later Landmark Group was operating three Max restaurants in Dubai, where the menu was modified to exclude bacon. The chain also operates restaurants in Poland. The first restaurant in Norway opened on 11 May 2011 followed by the first in Denmark on 1 March 2013, and in Poland 1 September 2017.

As of 17 December 2024, there are 155 restaurants in Sweden, 26 restaurants in Poland, eight in Norway and six in Denmark.

The name Max came from the nickname of Curt Bergfors, which was taken from Swedish actor Max von Sydow.

== Reception ==
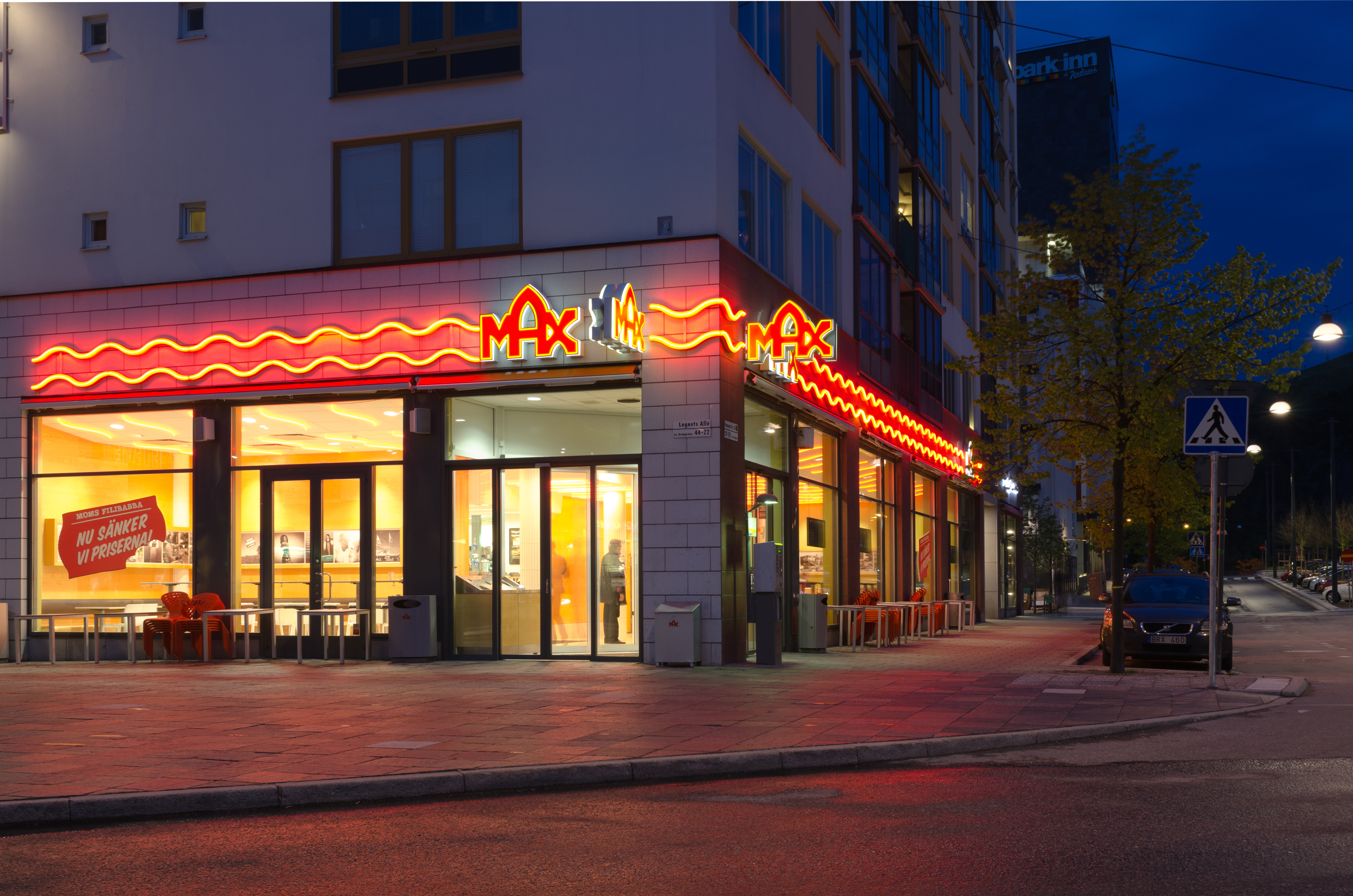
A Max Restaurant in Hammarby Sjöstad, Stockholm in Sweden.

Max was the first hamburger restaurant in Sweden to outcompete McDonald's restaurants, which happened in 1991 in Umeå and Luleå, where McDonald's (who arrived later in northern Sweden than in Sweden's major cities) in fact closed their restaurants before returning a few years later. In 2007, the popularity of Max forced the McDonald's in Skellefteå, Piteå and, again, in Luleå out of business.

Locations by country

The number of stores per country is as follows:

- Europe: Sweden (155), Poland (26),Norway (8), Denmark (6).

== Controversies and legal challenges ==
- In 1984, Max and McDonald's disputed the trademark of "Big Max," with McDonald's claiming it was too similar to "Big Mac." Initially, Max won in district court, but McDonald's won on appeal. Eventually, they reached a settlement where "Big Max" was renamed "BIG!".
- In 1992, Frasses, another burger chain, was ordered to pay Max 6 million SEK plus legal costs after its subsidiary deceived Max by purchasing a property under the pretense of using it for an art gallery, but instead opened a restaurant. The court ruled in 1996 that Frasses' subsidiary acted fraudulently, but Frasses then declared the subsidiary bankrupt. In 2005, the Supreme Court decided that the parent company was still liable. Max CEO Richard Bergfors donated the damages and legal cost compensation to SOS Children's Villages.
- In 2004, Max sued a restaurant in Tehran for allegedly copying Max's logo, interior design, and menu.
- In 2007, the SVT program Uppdrag Granskning revealed that a cleaning company contracted by Max was using undocumented workers. Max terminated the contract, offered jobs to the cleaners, and contracted with Samhall for cleaning services.
- Ahead of the 2009 UEFA European Under-21 Football Championship, UEFA required a "Clean Arena", meaning competitors of the main sponsors could not operate in or near the arena. Because McDonald's was a sponsor, Max in Borås was required to close its restaurant at the football stadium during the event. This applied even on days when there were no matches. Max was willing to close only during matches, but UEFA did not accept this. As a result, UEFA decided not to hold any matches in Borås. In late 2009, Max agreed with the city of Borås to close if necessary for future events at Borås Arena. When Max opened at Gamla Ullevi in late 2008, the contract stipulated that the arena owner could decide to close the restaurant.
- In autumn 2009, Max boycotted Dole Food Company because of their actions regarding Fredrik Gertten's documentary film, which revealed Dole's use of the harmful pesticide DBCP on its plantations in Nicaragua.
- In 2014, an internal monthly letter to employees, signed by Richard and Christoffer Bergfors, stated that "there would be consequences for the business" if the Left Party, Social Democrats, or Green Party were successful in the election. Richard Bergfors stated that the Social Democrats' proposals to raise restaurant VAT and phase out reduced employer contributions for young people were "idiotic proposals." He later maintained that Max was politically independent. Some praised Max and the Bergfors brothers for "speaking clearly," while others criticized them for encouraging employees to vote a certain way, which the brothers claimed was a misunderstanding.

== 2025 hygiene scandal ==
In February 2025, Swedish media reported widespread hygiene and food safety violations at Max. An investigation by Aftonbladet revealed that employees at multiple locations engaged in improper food handling practices.

Reports included food being served past its expiration time, the use of the same cleaning cloths for toilets and food preparation areas, and milkshake machines being cleaned with contaminated water. Additionally, some employees admitted to resetting timers to extend the serving time of heated food beyond safe limits.

Aftonbladet reviewed 99 reports from food safety inspectors, which documented issues such as mould, insect infestations, rodent droppings, and ingrained dirt at multiple Max restaurants.

In response, Max's communications chief, Henric Byström, stated that the company took the allegations "with the highest seriousness". The company announced an internal investigation and a mandatory hygiene and food safety training program for all employees.

=== Cross-contamination of vegetarian products ===
The investigation also revealed that vegetarian and vegan products were often fried in the same oil as chicken, contradicting the company's advertised food safety standards. Employees stated that this practice was imposed to meet time constraints, despite violating internal policies regarding the separation of meat and vegetarian products.

A former Max manager claimed that the issue was widely known within the company but was disregarded as long as it remained undisclosed to the public. Max confirmed that some older restaurant locations did not fully separate frying equipment for vegetarian and meat products, citing kitchen space limitations, but pledged to address the issue through gradual renovations.

=== Employee non-disclosure orders ===
Following the publication of the investigation, reports surfaced that Max was requiring employees to sign non-disclosure agreements (NDAs) preventing them from discussing workplace conditions. According to sources, employees were warned not to speak to the media about internal issues, raising concerns about transparency and workers' rights.

== See also ==
- List of hamburger restaurants
