= Lena Sundström =

Swedish journalist and author

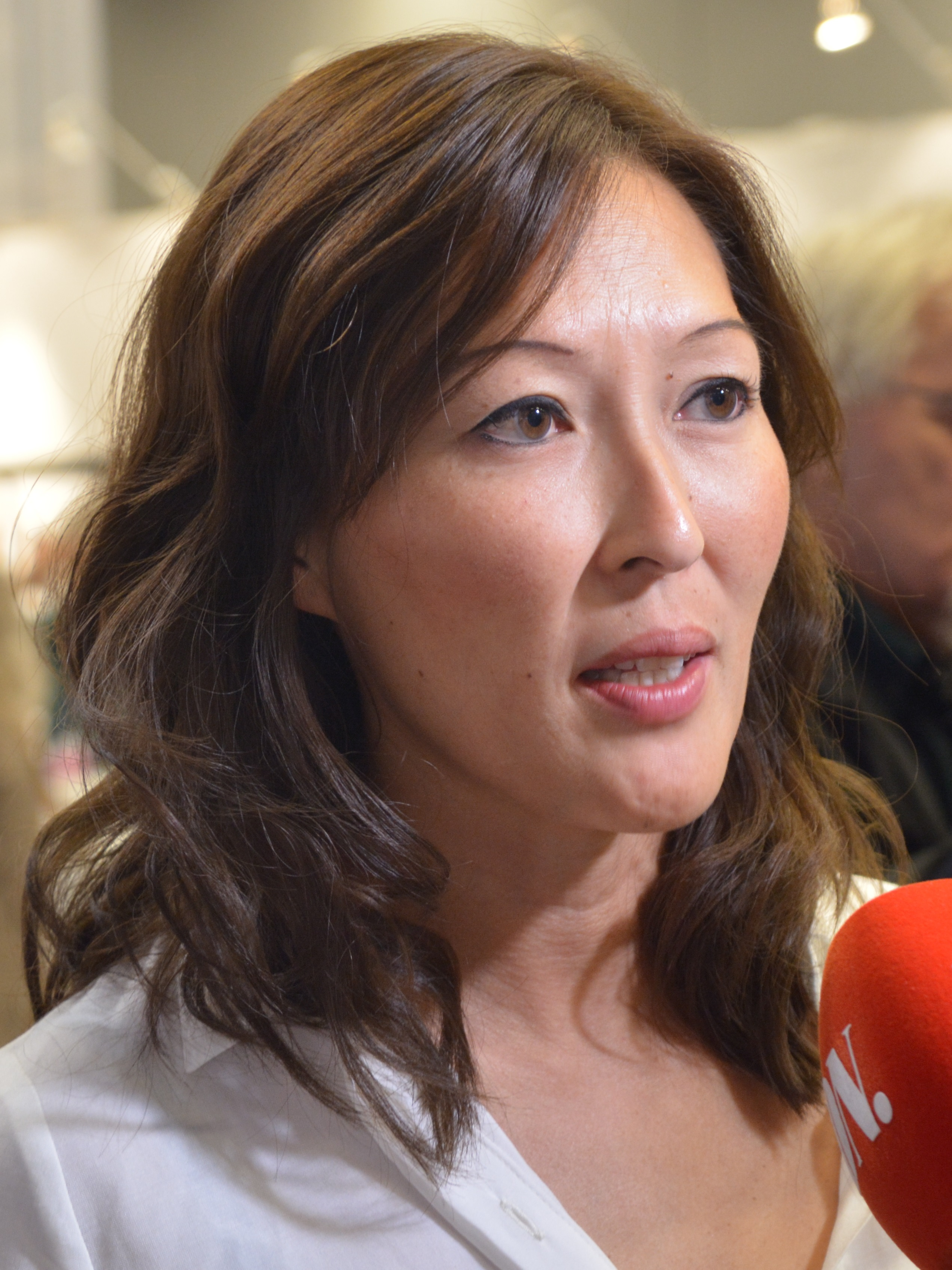
- Lena Sundström in 2015.
- Born: Lena Amalia Kyoung Ran Åkesson; 8 March 1972 (age 54); Seoul, South Korea
- Occupations: Journalist, author, television presenter
- Spouse(s): Bo Sundström (1996–2016; divorced); Pieter ten Hoopen (2017–2020; divorced)
- Children: 2

Lena Amalia Kyoung Ran Sundström (born 8 March 1972) is a Swedish journalist and author. She writes news chronicles and writes for Swedish daily newspaper Dagens Nyheter. She has also had her own column at Aftonbladet newspaper, Metro newspaper's Swedish editions, Mersmak and Dagens Arbete.

== Early life ==
Sundström was born in Seoul, South Korea, to an unknown mother and was found outside an orphanage on 8 April 1972. She was estimated to be about one month old at the time, and her birthdate was arbitrarily set at 8 March 1972 (one month earlier). She was adopted by a Swedish family when she was 6 months old. She studied in Kristianstad, and also continued to study media and communications in Lund and Copenhagen and journalism at Poppius journalistskola.

== Career ==
She started her career as a journalist at Piteå-Tidningen newspaper, and made her debut as an author in 2005 with the release of the book Saker jag inte förstår och personer jag inte gillar (Things I don't understand and people I don't like).

Her second book, Känns det fint att finnas en dag till? (Does it feel good to exist for one more day?), was released in 2007. She has been a television presenter as well, presenting the TV4 investigative show Kalla fakta after Lennart Ekdal chose to leave the show.

In August 2009, she authored her third book, Världens lyckligaste folk, about Denmark's tough policy concerning immigrants. In the same year, a documentary with the same name as the book aired on TV4; it was created by Sundström.

In 2013, her second documentary, called Dom kallas rasister, was broadcast on TV4. In the same year her next book called Spår was published; this book is about two asylum seekers who in 2001 were deported by Sweden to Egypt where they were tortured by the regime.

Sundström won a number of prizes for her work including Guldspaden journalism award in 2009, the Gleerups literary award also in 2009, the Swedish Publicists' Association Publicistklubben award in 2010, the Torgny Segerstedts frihetspenna (Freedom pen) award in 2014 and the Jolopriset literary award in 2016.

== Personal life ==
Sundström married Swedish singer Bo Sundström and has two daughters. In 2010, they competed together in the TV show På spåret where they were placed fifth. The couple divorced in 2016.

== Works ==
- 2005: Saker jag inte förstår – och personer jag inte gillar
- 2007: Känns det fint att finnas en dag till?
- 2009: Världens lyckligaste folk : en bok om Danmark
- 2013: Spår ISBN 9789127133983
