= Svenska Spel =

Swedish gambling company

AB Svenska Spel

- Company headquarters in Visby
- Type: State-owned enterprise
- Industry: Gambling
- Founded: 1 January 1997; 29 years ago
- Headquarters: Visby Sweden
- Number of employees: 1,657 (December 2015)
- Parent: Government of Sweden 100%
- Subsidiaries: Casino Cosmopol (100%)
- Website: www.svenskaspel.se

AB Svenska Spel (lit. 'Swedish games') is a state-owned company operating in the regulated gambling market in Sweden. For many years, the company was the only one permitted to offer online gambling to people in Sweden, whether it be casino games, sports betting, or other types of games.

All profits from the company's activities are paid directly to the State Treasury of Sweden. Svenska Spel organizes sports and number lotteries.

The Swedish gambling reforms attempt to strike a balance between giving players the freedom to choose and protecting them from bad actors.

It conducts sales through approximately 6,700 agents, 2,000 restaurants, pubs, and bingo halls as well as via the Internet. The surplus from the company's operations is paid directly to the Public Treasury.

== History ==
The company was founded on 1 January 1997 by the merger of the two state companies, Svenska penninglotteriet (lit. 'The money lottery') and Tipstjänst (lit. 'Betting service'). The headquarters is located in Visby, Sweden.

Tipstjänst was founded in 1934, and later nationalized in 1943. Erik Bergqvist and two other founders owned the only private shares in the company until a reorganization in the 1970s. By the 25th anniversary of Tipstjänst in 1959, the company had taken bets totalling SEK 1.8 billion (equivalent to SEK 27.15 billion in 2023).

On 1 January 2019, Sweden brought in new laws that ended the state-run online gambling company's monopoly and opened the market to private operators.

Starting from 2 November 2020, Erika Svanström became the new head of public affairs of Svenska Spel. Since April 2019, she has been an independent advisor on public affairs questions at the company.
