= Apoteket =

Swedish pharmaceuticals retailer

Apoteket AB
- Company type: Swedish government enterprise
- Founded: 1970
- Headquarters: Solna, Sweden
- Key people: Ann Carlsson (CEO)
- Products: Pharmaceuticals
- Revenue: SEK 26.275 million (2010)
- Number of employees: 2,821 (2023)
- Website: https://www.apoteket.se/

Apoteket AB is a state-owned pharmaceuticals retailer in Sweden which formerly held a monopoly on the retail sale of medicines in the country. Formerly known as Apoteksbolaget, the company is a government owned enterprise reporting to the Ministry of Finance.

== History ==
The company was founded in 1970 under the name Apoteksbolaget AB. In 1998 the name was changed to the current one, Apoteket AB.

On 1 July 2009, the government monopoly was lifted, allowing the opening of private pharmacies in Sweden. The Swedish government cited the fact of Sweden being the only democracy, along with Cuba and North Korea, to retain its monopoly as an argument for its abolishment.
