= Akademiska Hus =

Swedish Government enterprise

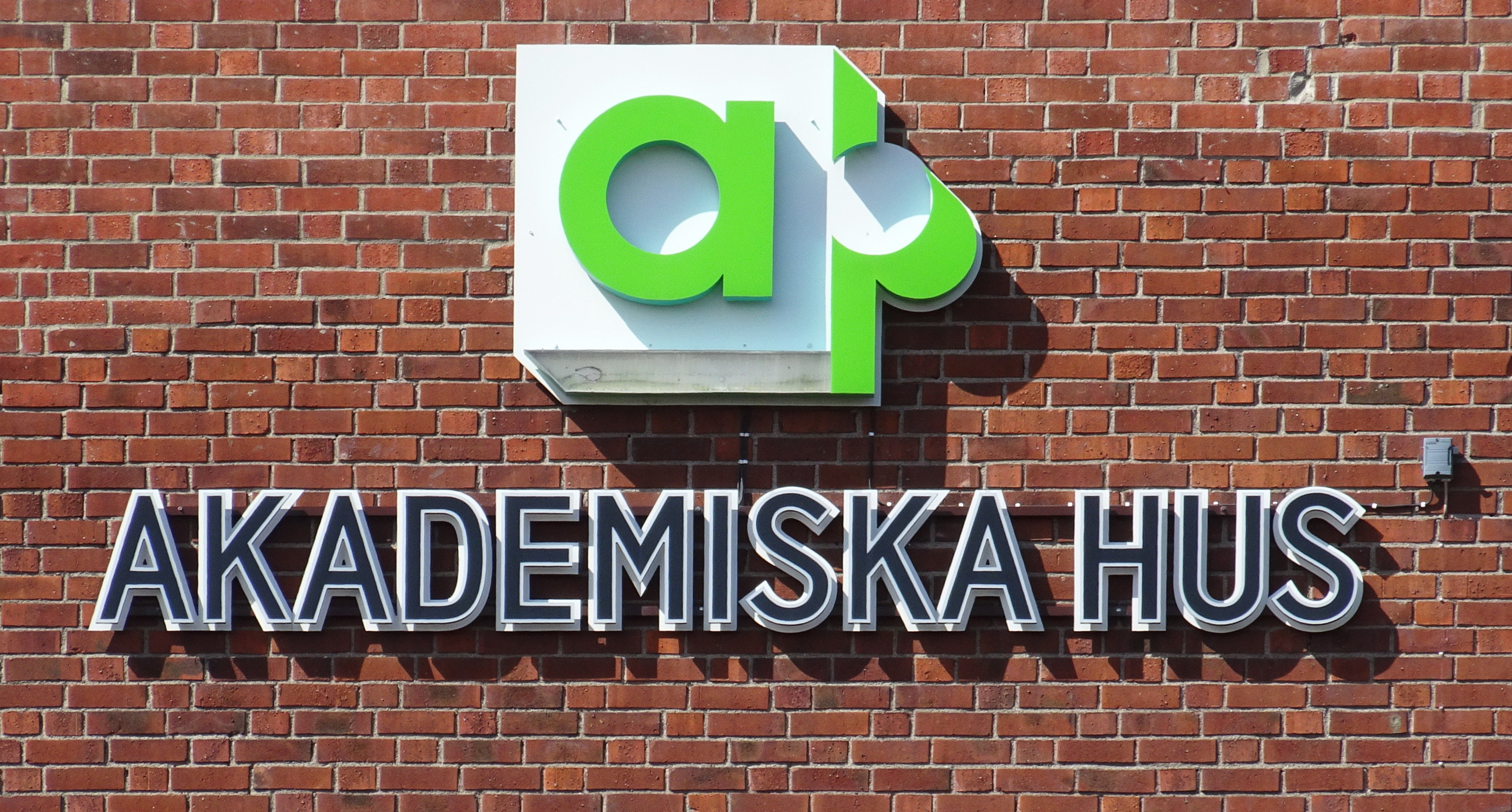
- Industry: Real estate
- Founded: October 1, 1993; 32 years ago
- Headquarters: Gothenburg, Sweden
- Key people: Anitra Steen
- Owner: Government of Sweden
- Number of employees: 523 (2020)
- Parent: Regeringskansliet
- Website: www.akademiskahus.se

Akademiska Hus is a wholly owned Swedish Government enterprise with the mission to own, develop and manage property with a focus on educational and research activities — like colleges and universities — and to conduct related business. Its operations are carried out on a businesslike manner, with market rents, to generate a return. The company should also promote sustainable long-term development, according to instruction by the Government.

The company was established on October 1, 1993, after the National Board of Public Building (Swedish: Byggnadsstyrelsen) split into several smaller units, including Akademiska Hus, Vasakronan and the National Property Board of Sweden.

== Criticism ==
Akademiska Hus has been criticised by the presidents of KTH and CTH for taking out rents that are far above market value. They also claim that it would practically be impossible for the universities to relocate and rent from anyone else. More recently Akademiska Hus has received criticism from professors at KTH who claim that wages have been cut to keep up with rent. The presidents of 30 Swedish universities have also argued that the system needs to be changed to alleviate their financial situation.

== See also ==
- Government-owned corporation
- List of government enterprises of Sweden
