= Samhall =

Swedish government owned company

Samhall AB
- Company type: State Limited Company
- Founded: 1980
- Headquarters: Stockholm, Sweden
- Area served: Sweden
- Key people: Cecilia Schelin Seidegård, Board chairman Sara Revell Ford, CEO
- Services: Employment Services
- Revenue: ▲9.295 billion SEK (2019)
- Owner: Swedish State, 100%
- Number of employees: 24,124 (2019)
- Parent: Government of Sweden
- Website: Official website

Samhall AB is a Swedish state-owned limited company with the task of creating meaningful and developing jobs for people with disabilities. The company was founded in 1980 and is today one of the Swedish state's largest companies in terms of number of employees. The name Samhall is similar to the Swedish word "Samhälle" which translates to English as "Community" or "Society".

During the company's first decades, the business was dominated by its own industrial production, however today, most of the employees work in service or staffing in other companies.

== History ==
Workshops, office work, housework, and other types of sheltered work began to appear in the 1960s in Sweden, with various actors, such as municipalities and county labour boards in charge of these. During the 1970s, flaws in these systems were identified. They were poorly organized. and the chances of having a secure job varied greatly between regions.

In response to these flaws, In 1980, the "Foundation for Social Enterprises" (Sv: Stiftelsen Samhällsföretagen) was established, consolidating the various regional activities.

In 1992, the foundation became a group, with Samhall AB as the parent company and several regional subsidiaries. The Group was merged into one business, Samhall AB, in 2002.

== Criticisms ==
In March 2021, Dagens Arbete began an investigation into Samhall and has published over 30 articles.

In April 2021, Uppdrag granskning published an investigation about Samhall sifting away the weak and prioritising business over people.

== See also ==
- Swedish Public Employment Service
- Supported employment
- Disability policy in Sweden
- List of government enterprises of Sweden
