= Bo Sundström =

Swedish musician

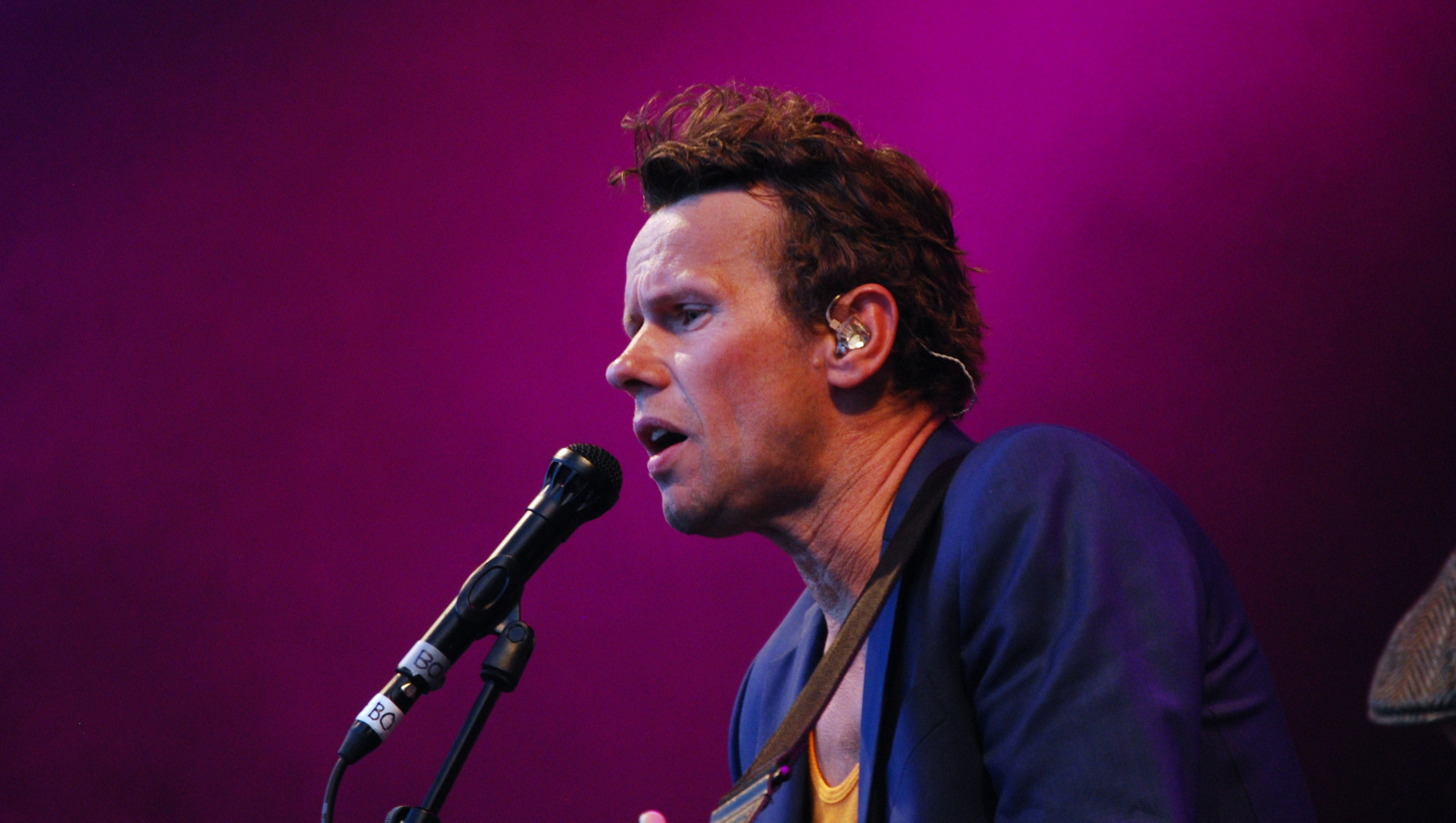
- Sundström in 2011.
- Born: 16 October 1961 (age 64); Piteå, Sweden
- Occupations: Singer, songwriter
- Spouse: Lena Sundström (divorced)
- Children: 2

Bo Sigvard Sundström (born 16 October 1961) is a Swedish singer and songwriter. He is best known as the lead singer of Bo Kaspers orkester. As a solo singer he has released two music albums called Skåne (2004) and Den lyckliges väg (2007). Sundström participated in the TV4 show Så mycket bättre in 2013. He also participated along with his ex-wife Lena Sundström in På spåret in 2010 where they placed fifth. He has also been a guest on Babben & Co with Babben Larsson and Sommarkrysset presented by Gry Forssell.
