= SJ B7 =

B7
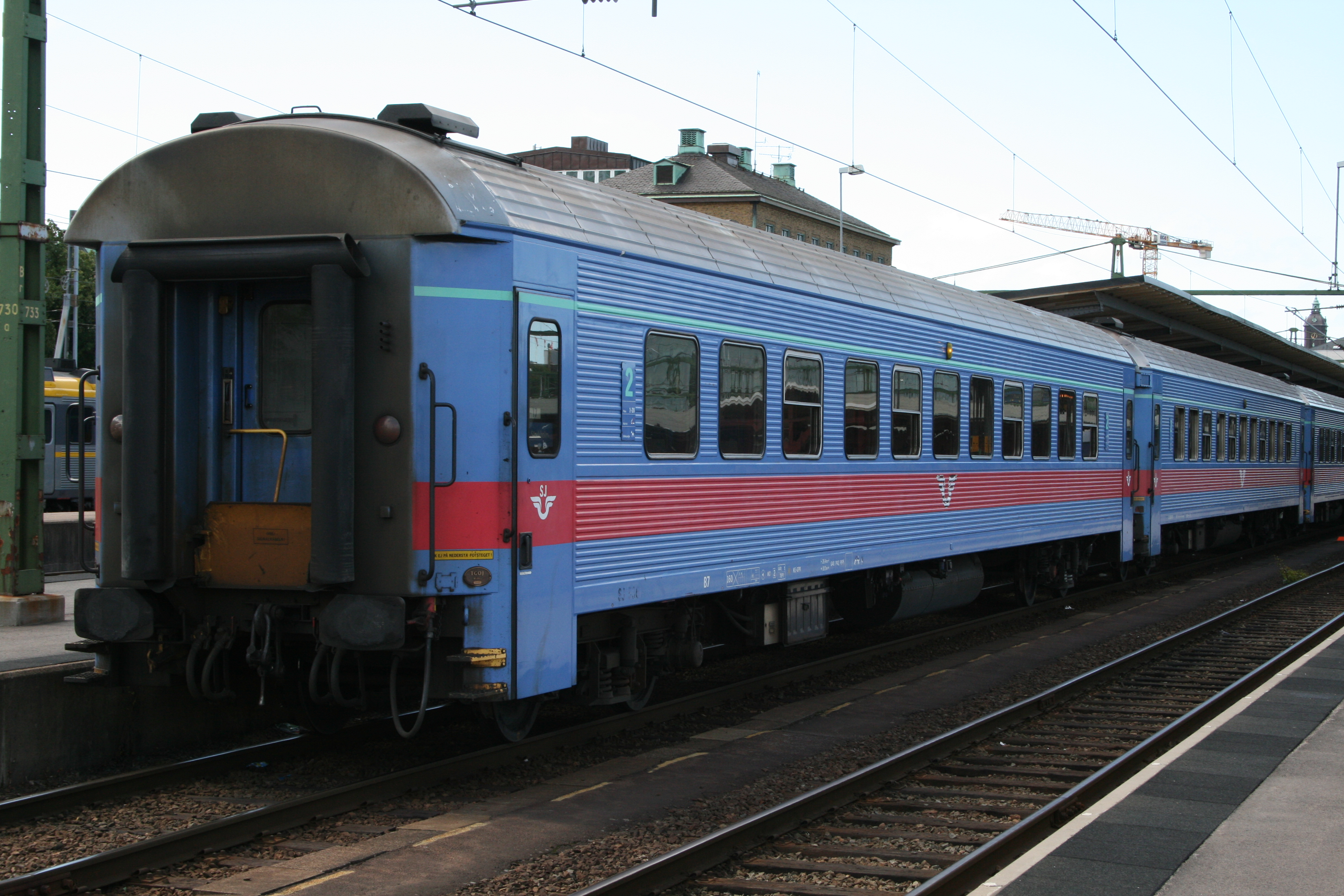
- A B7 in the old SJ livery at Gothenburg Central Station
- In service: 1979–present
- Constructed: 1979-1990
- Entered service: 1979
- Number built: 171
- Capacity: 78 2nd class seats
- Operators: SJ, TÅGAB

Specifications
- Maximum speed: 160 km/h (99 mph)
- Track gauge: 1,435 mm (4 ft 8 1/2 in) standard gauge

B7 is a Swedish second-class passenger car of the 1980s-car series.

== History ==
The first B7 carriage was delivered in 1979 and is today making up the majority of SJ's passenger carriages together with the A7 carriage. The last of the 171 carriages was delivered in 1990.

Some of the carriages were in 1990s rebuilt into other types of passenger cars, but when SJ initiated their modernisation program in the late 2000s they were rebuilt again to match the B7 standard. The upgrades made during the modernisation include 230 V power outlets, new seating as well as an overall modernised interior design. The carriages were also repainted into SJ's current black livery. The carriages are easily distinguishable from other types by the white stripes around the doors.
