= SJ AB =

Swedish state-owned passenger train operator

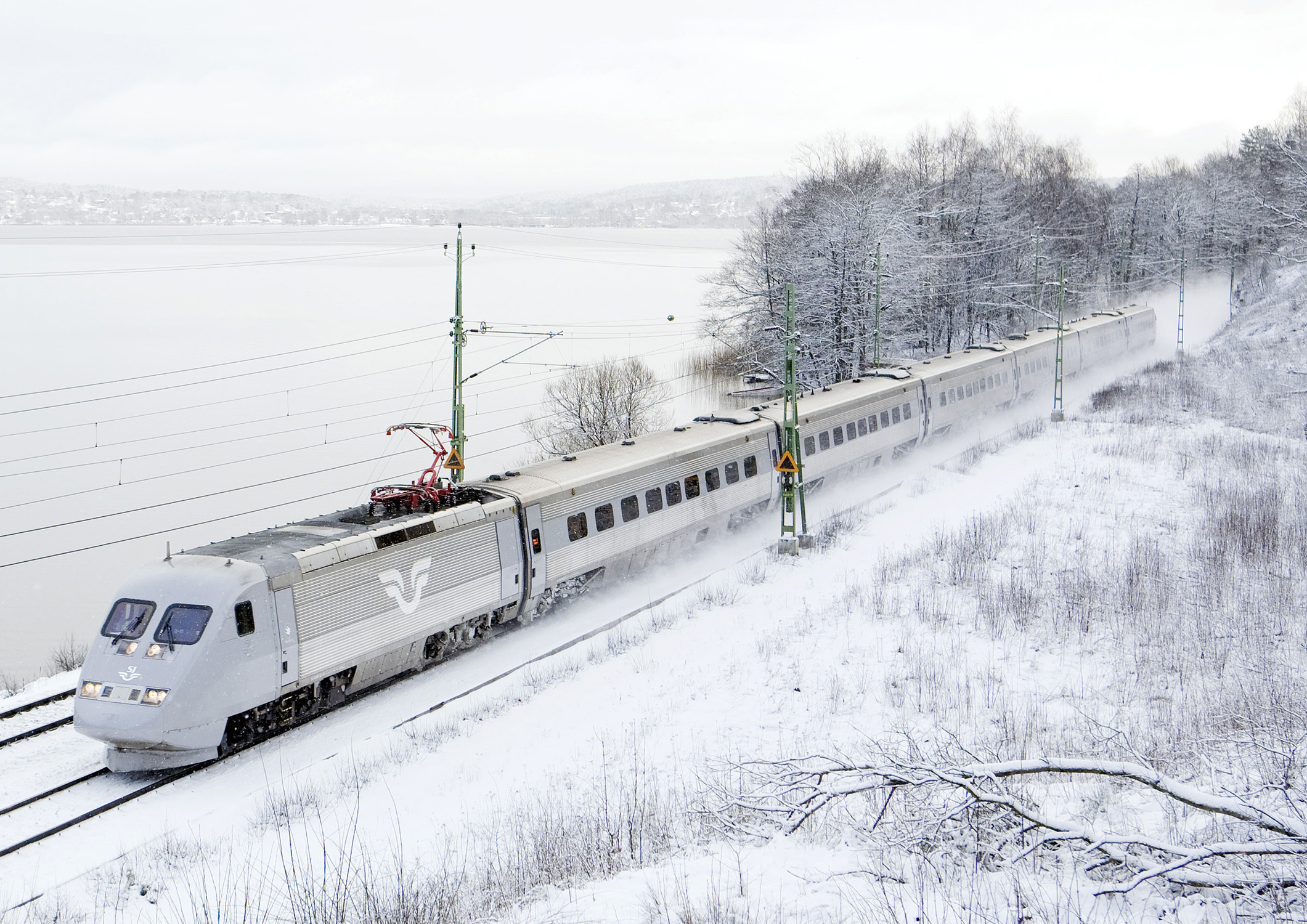
- SJ X 2000 train
- Type: State-owned Aktiebolag
- Industry: Rail transport
- Predecessor: Swedish State Railways
- Founded: 1 January 2001
- Headquarters: Vasagatan 10, Stockholm, Sweden
- Area served: Sweden: Most of Sweden; Norway: As SJ AB: Kongsvinger Line to Oslo; As SJ Norge AS: Dovre Line; Nordland Line; Rauma Line; Røros Line; Germany: Stockholm to Berlin
- Key people: Jonas Abrahamsson (CEO)
- Revenue: 1.055 billion SEK (2025)
- Net income: 14.517 Billion SEK (2025)
- Owner: Government of Sweden
- Number of employees: Total approx. 7100; Götalandståg approx. 800; Stockholmståg approx. 1 800; SJ Norge approx. 400; Krösa approx. 320 (2025)
- Subsidiaries: SJ Götalandståg; SJ Stockholmståg; SJ Norge; SJ Norrlandståg; SJ Krösa; SJ Öresund AB (not active); AJ Mälardalen AB (not active)
- Website: sj.se (Sweden) sj.no (Norway)

SJ is the primary passenger train operator in Sweden. A wholly state-owned company operated for-profit under market conditions, SJ operates various services across Sweden. SJ's operations include high-speed trains, intercity trains, night trains, and regional trains, with some services extending into Denmark, Norway and Germany.

SJ traces its roots back to 1856, however was established in its current form as a passenger train operator (SJ AB) in 2001, following the restructuring of Statens Järnvägar, the former government agency responsible for the Swedish railways. SJ AB also has subsidiaries such as SJ Götalandståg, SJ Stockholmståg, and SJ Krösa, which operate procured regional services in various parts of Sweden. Since 2020 SJ Norge has operated regional services in Norway on behalf Jernbanedirektoratet. In 2025, SJ carried almost 1.5 million passengers in August 2025.

== Overview ==
SJ AB was formed in 2001, following the restructuring of Statens Järnvägar. This restructuring divided the agency into six separate state-owned limited companies, including SJ for passenger trains, Green Cargo for freight, and Jernhusen for railway buildings. SJ's operations fall broadly into subsidised and unsubsidised services. The unsubsidised services ran until the 2011 monopoly. The subsidised trains are awarded through competitive bids. However, some trains fall in between these categories, since public transit agencies can pay SJ to allow transit pass holders access to SJ's trains.

SJ received a government bailout a few years after its creation, but has since had profit margins of up to ten percent. All train operators in Sweden pay low track access charges to the track authority, Trafikverket.

== Rolling stock ==
=== Current ===
==== X2 (X 2000) ====
The X2 trains (operated by SJ as X 2000) launched in 1990, and are used for higher-speed services and have a top speed of 200 km/h (125 mph). Built in Sweden by Kalmar Verkstad, later ADtranz, they feature tilting technology to reduce the effects of high-speed turns. These trains serve several routes, including Stockholm–Gothenburg (Västra Stambanan) and Stockholm–Malmö (Södra Stambanan). They have also previously served the Stockholm–Sundsvall, Stockholm–Strömstad, Stockholm–Oslo, and Stockholm–Östersund–(Duved) lines, with seasonal services on some of these routes. Currently, 36 X2 sets are in operation. Since 2021 the X2 fleet has been undergoing refurbishment, due for completion in 2026.

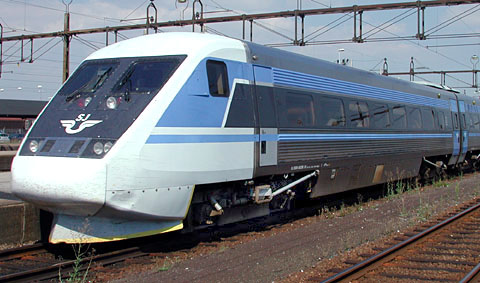
X2000 in original 1990s livery

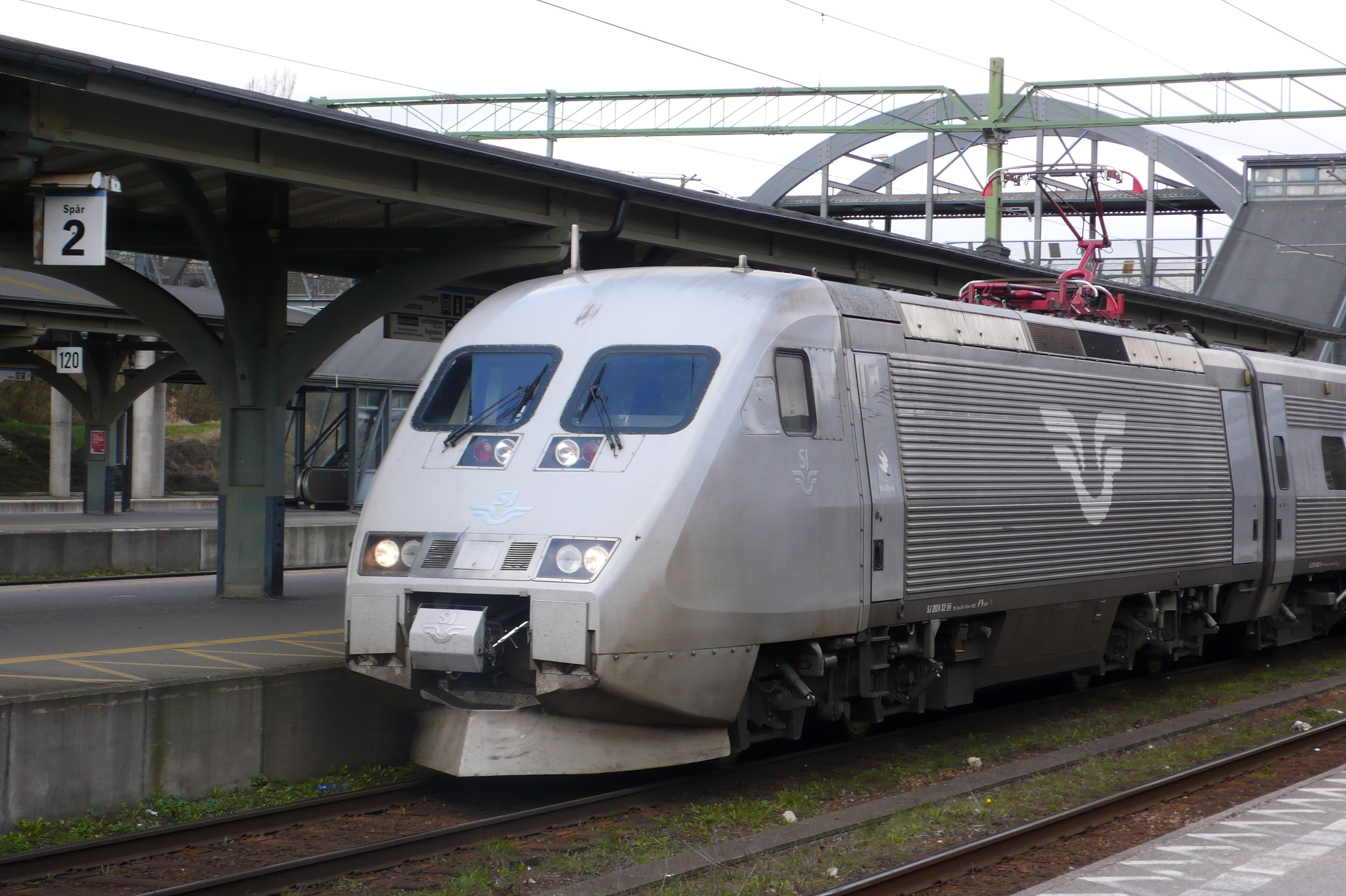
X2000 in updated livery (2008)

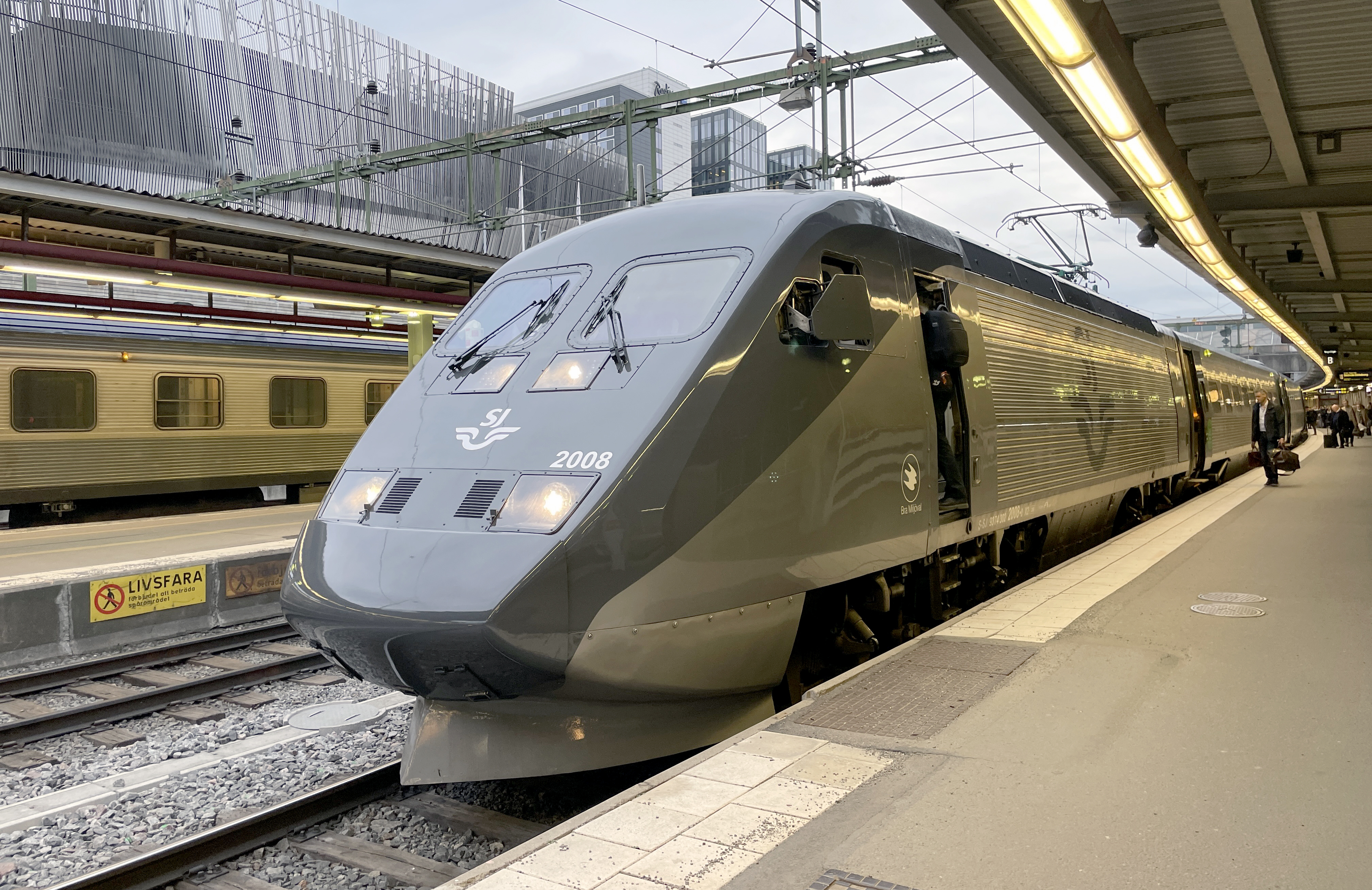
Refurbished X2000 (2022)

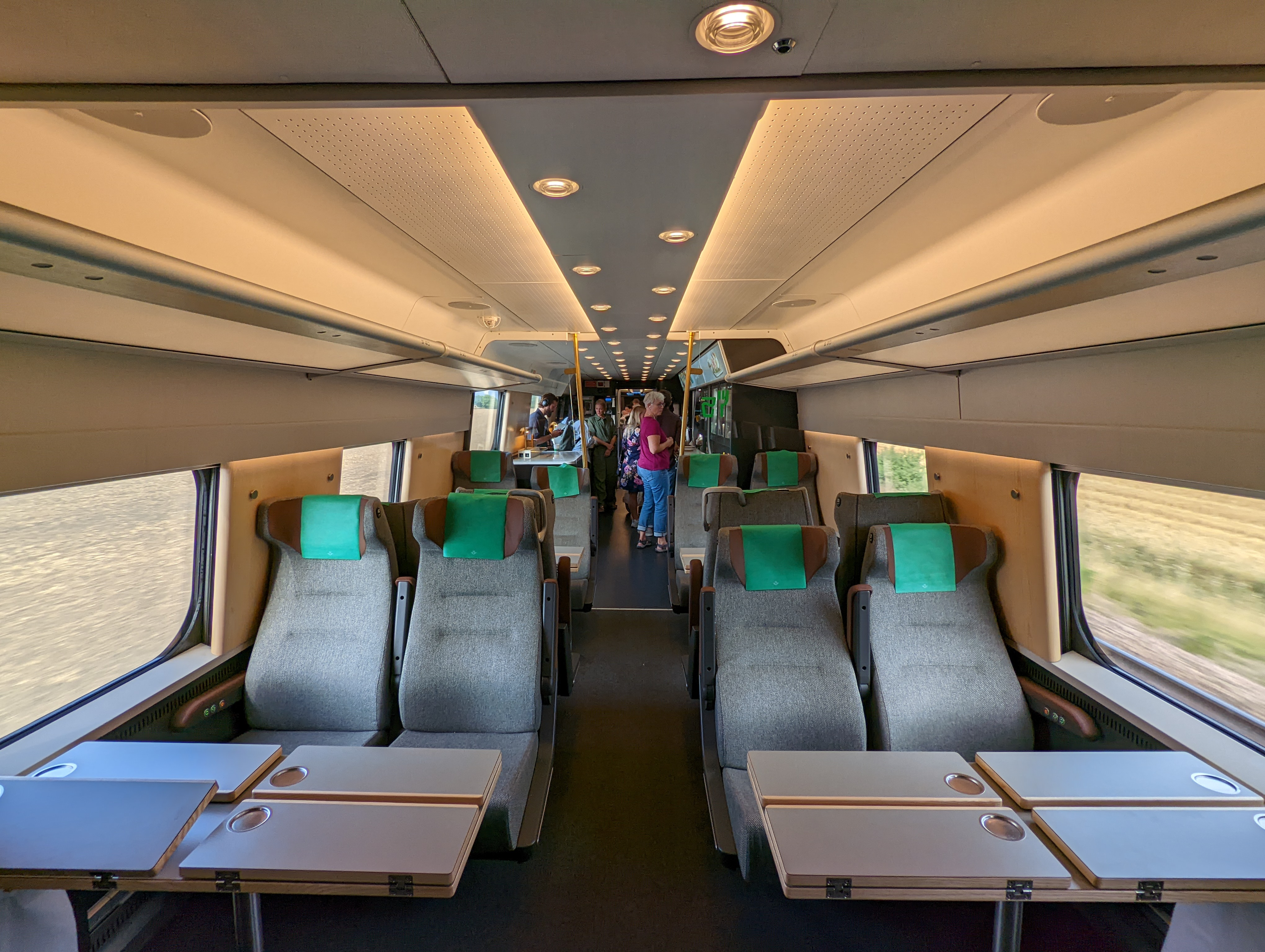
X2000 refurbished interior

==== X55 (SJ 3000) ====
The X55 (operated by SJ as SJ 3000) is an electric multiple unit built by Bombardier introduced in 2012. It has a top speed of 200 km/h and serves various routes, often north of Stockholm, including Stockholm-Östersund-(Duved) (Mittbanan-Norra Stambanan), Stockholm-Uddevalla (Västra Stambanan and Bohusbanan), Stockholm-Gothenburg, Stockholm-Sundsvall-Umeå (Ostkustbanan, Botniabanan), Gothenburg-Malmö (Västkustbanan), Stockholm-Oslo, Stockholm-Karlstad (Västra Stambanan and Värmlandsbanan/Kongsvingerbanen), and Stockholm-Falun/Mora (Dalabanan).

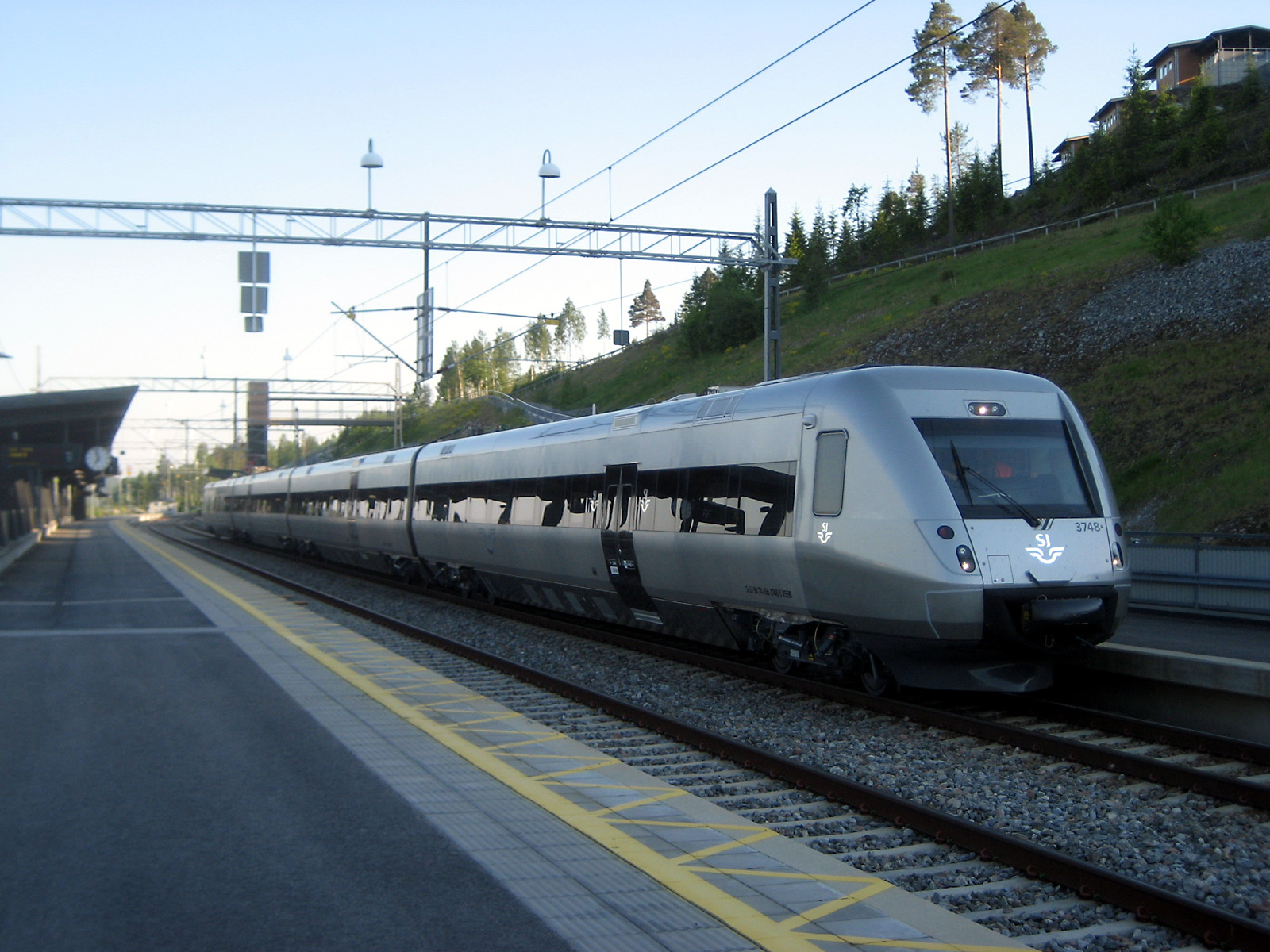
X55 at Örnsköldsvik Central Station

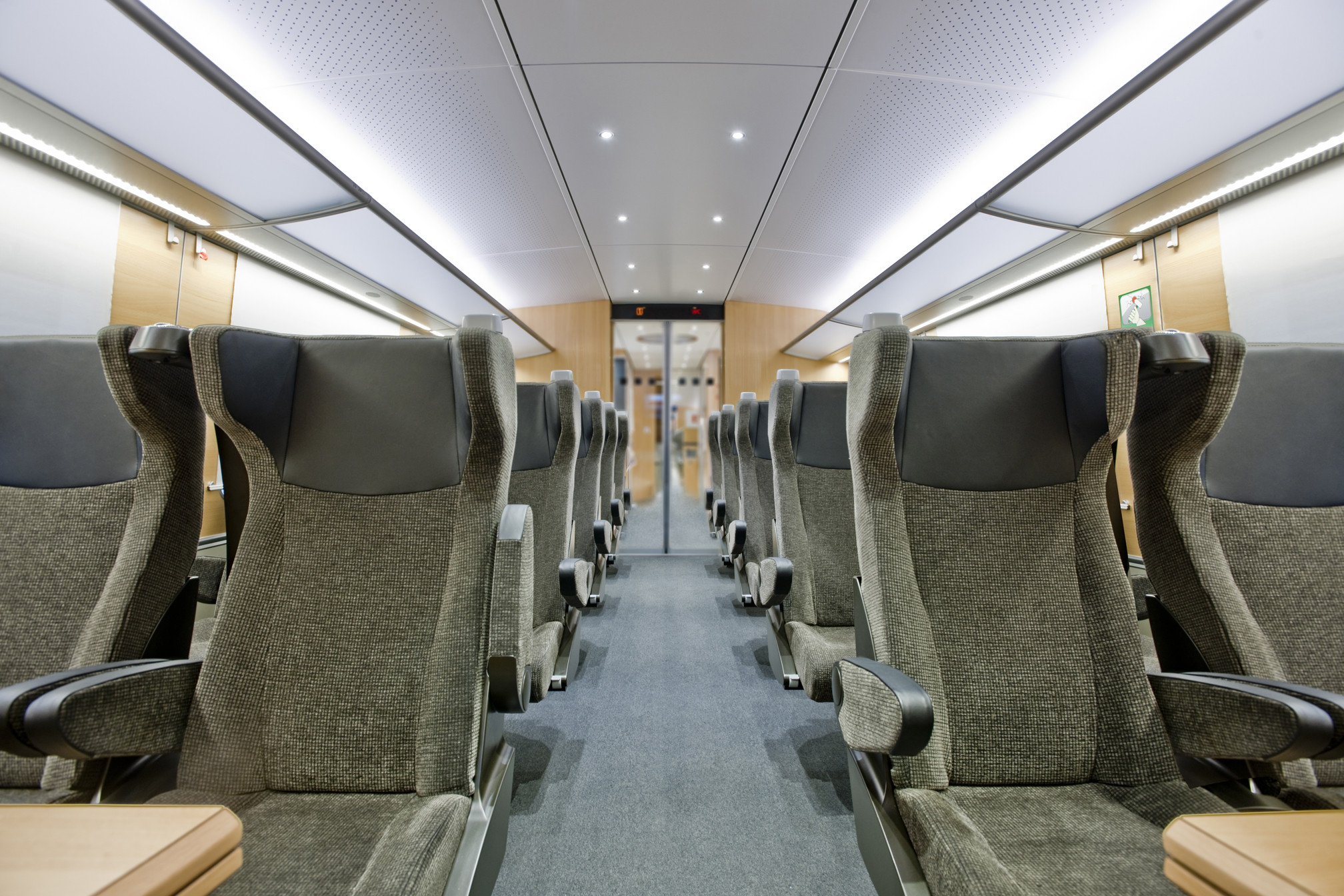
X55 interior

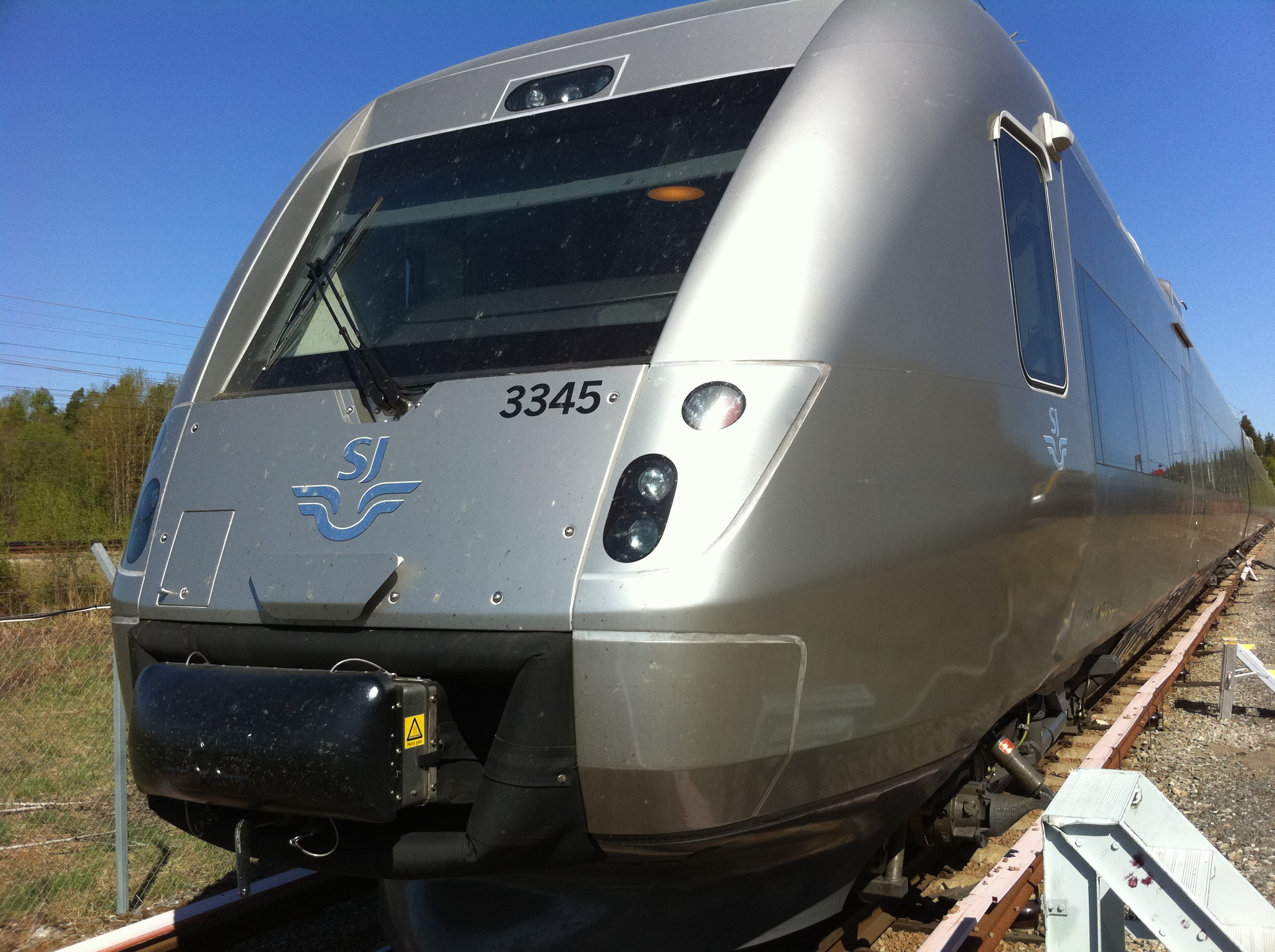
SJ X55

==== X40 ====
The X40 is a variant of the French Coradia Duplex double-decker electric multiple unit built by Alstom used for regional services, launched in 2006. It typically serves shorter routes such as Stockholm Central–Gävle Central. These trains are typically used for services that do not travel longer than 4 hours, with some exceptions like the Coast to Coast (Gothenburg-Kalmar) and Stockholm-Gothenburg via Västerås. The X40 has no catering service, and is mostly composed of second-class seating, with a small first class section, although the seats do not differ between first and second. The only exception being more legroom on refurbished units. All 27 three-car units are currently undergoing refurbishment by VR FleetCare in Oulu, due to be complete in 2027. With options to refurbish two-car units later.

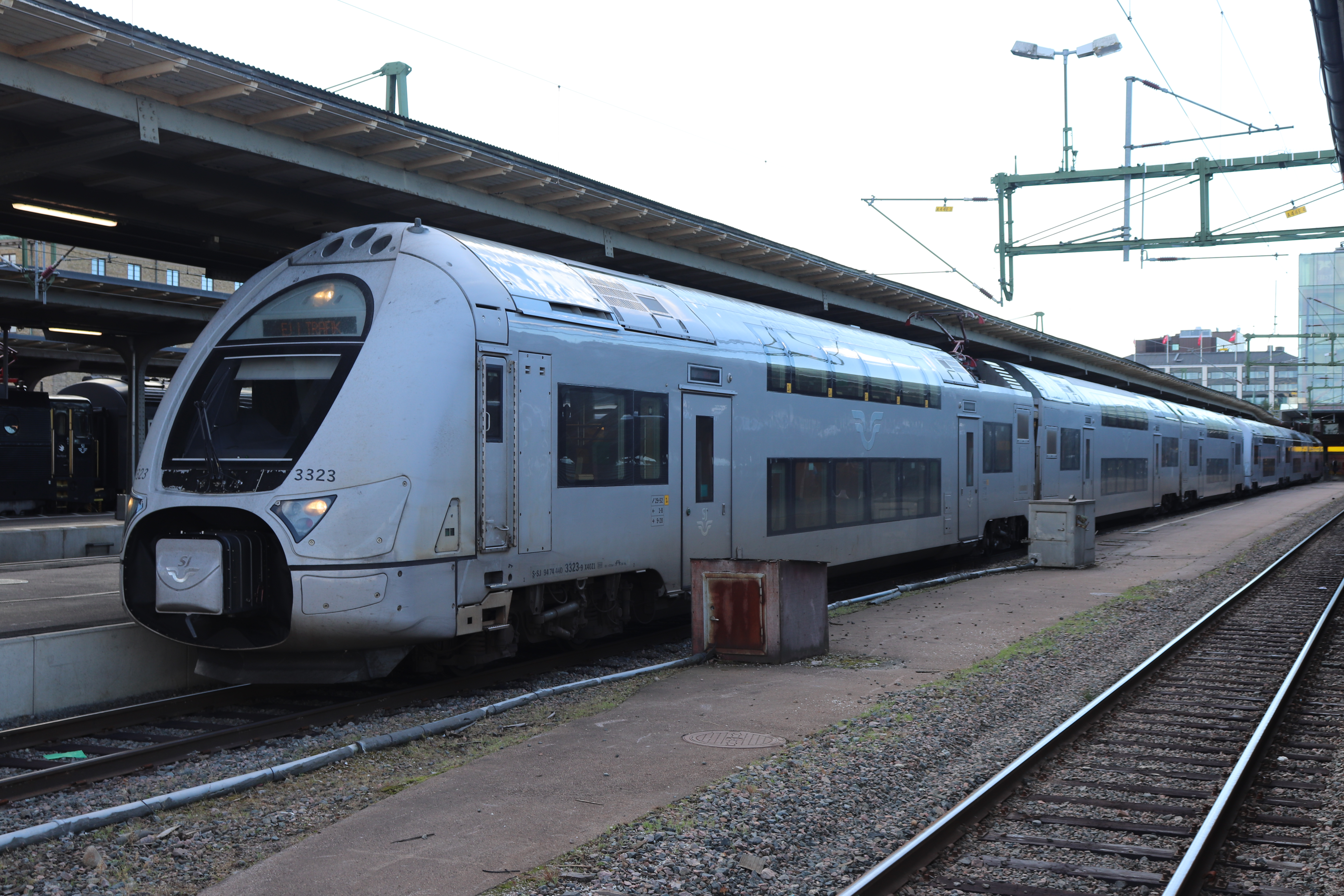
X40 at Gothenburg Central Station

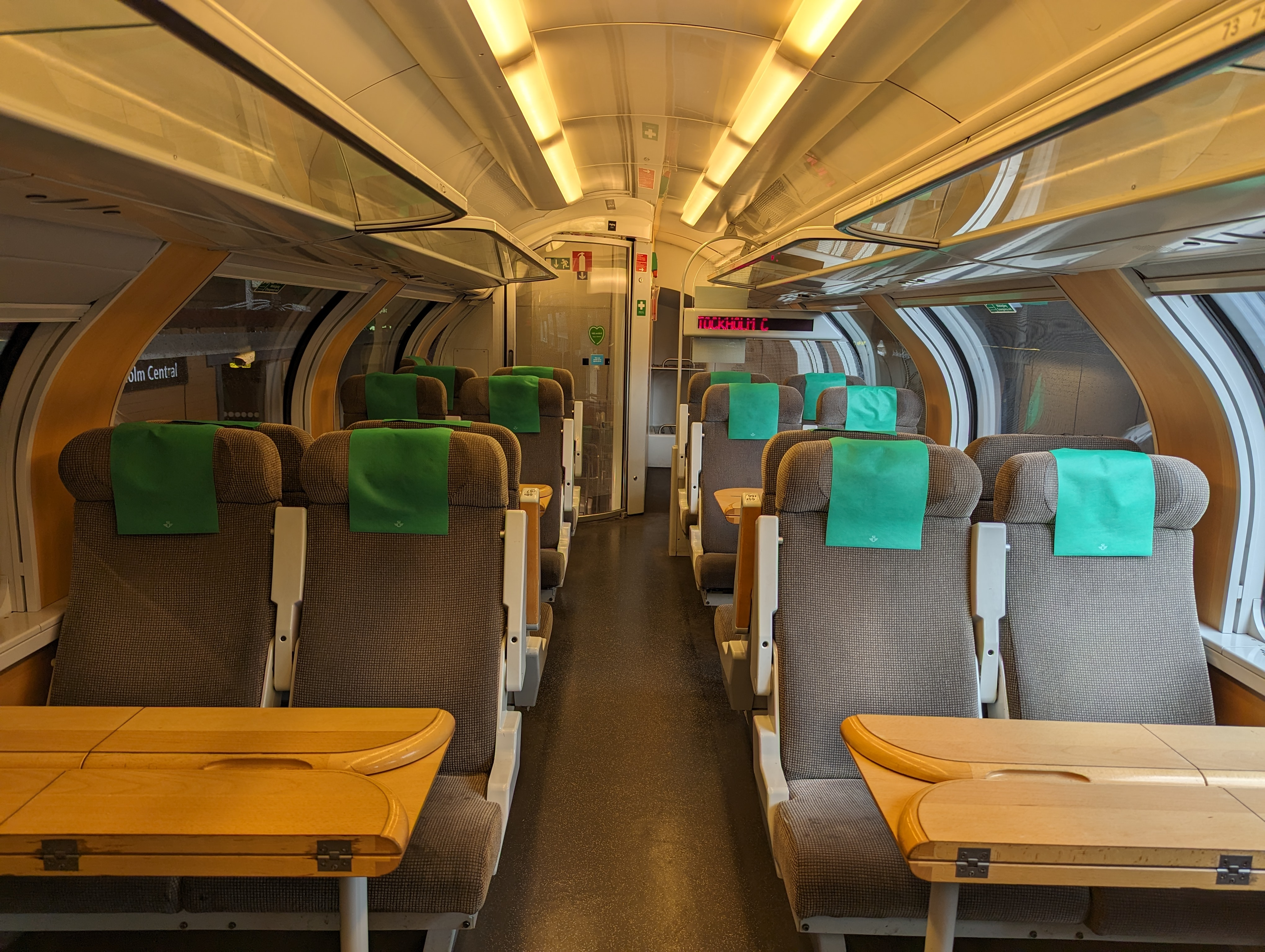
X40 upstairs interior

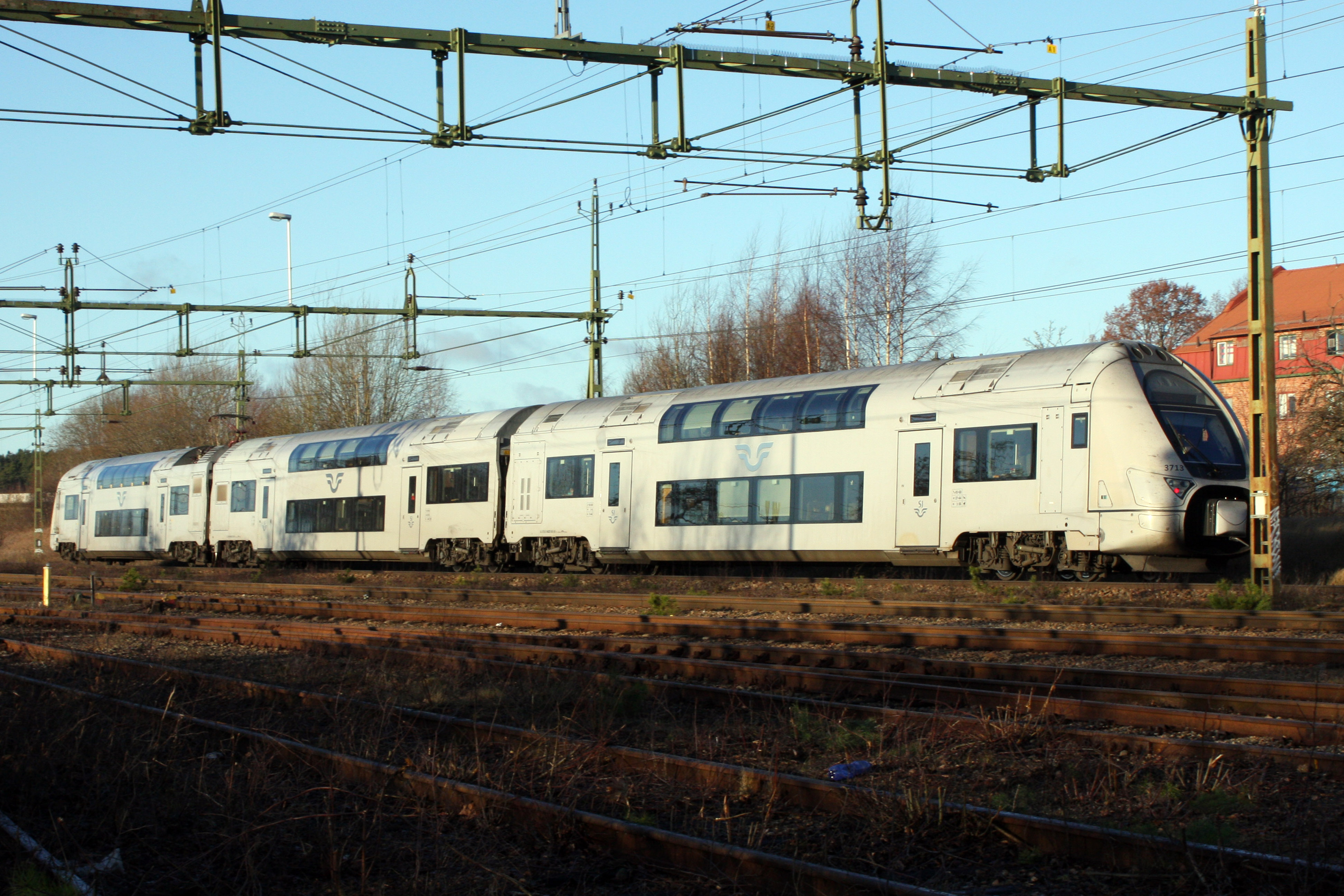
SJ X40

==== Rc-hauled Trains ====
Many InterCity services are often operated using Rc-hauled trains, which are paired with various carriages, such as the SJ B7, or other first class, second class, and sleeper carriages. The Rc-hauled trains often also feature an onboard bistro car.

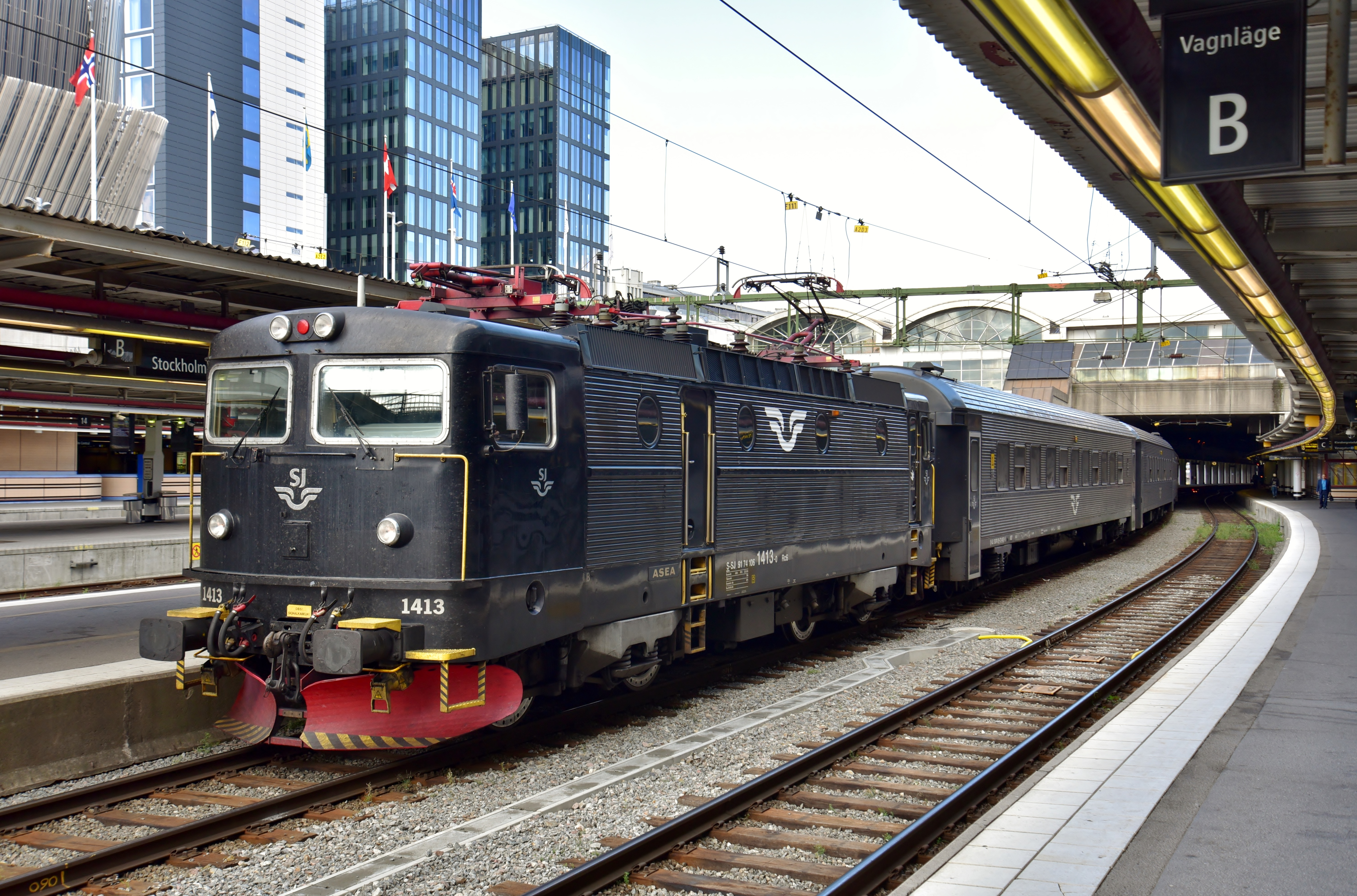
SJ Rc6

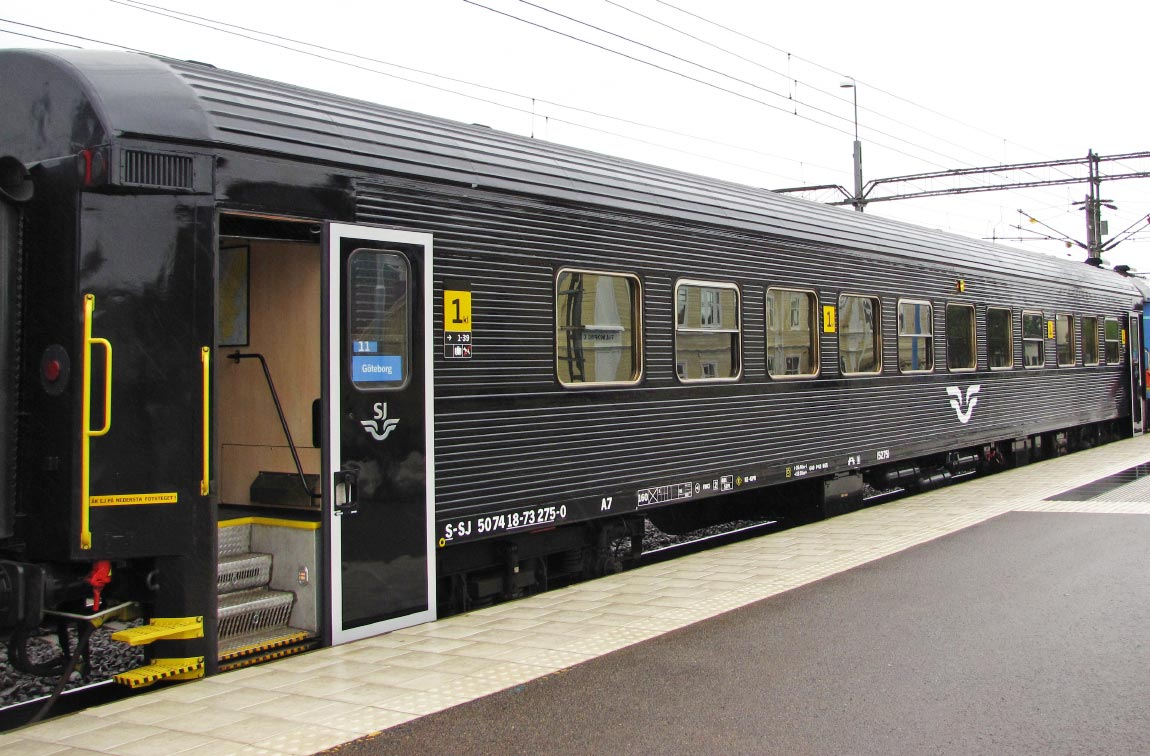
SJ Rc-hauled carriages

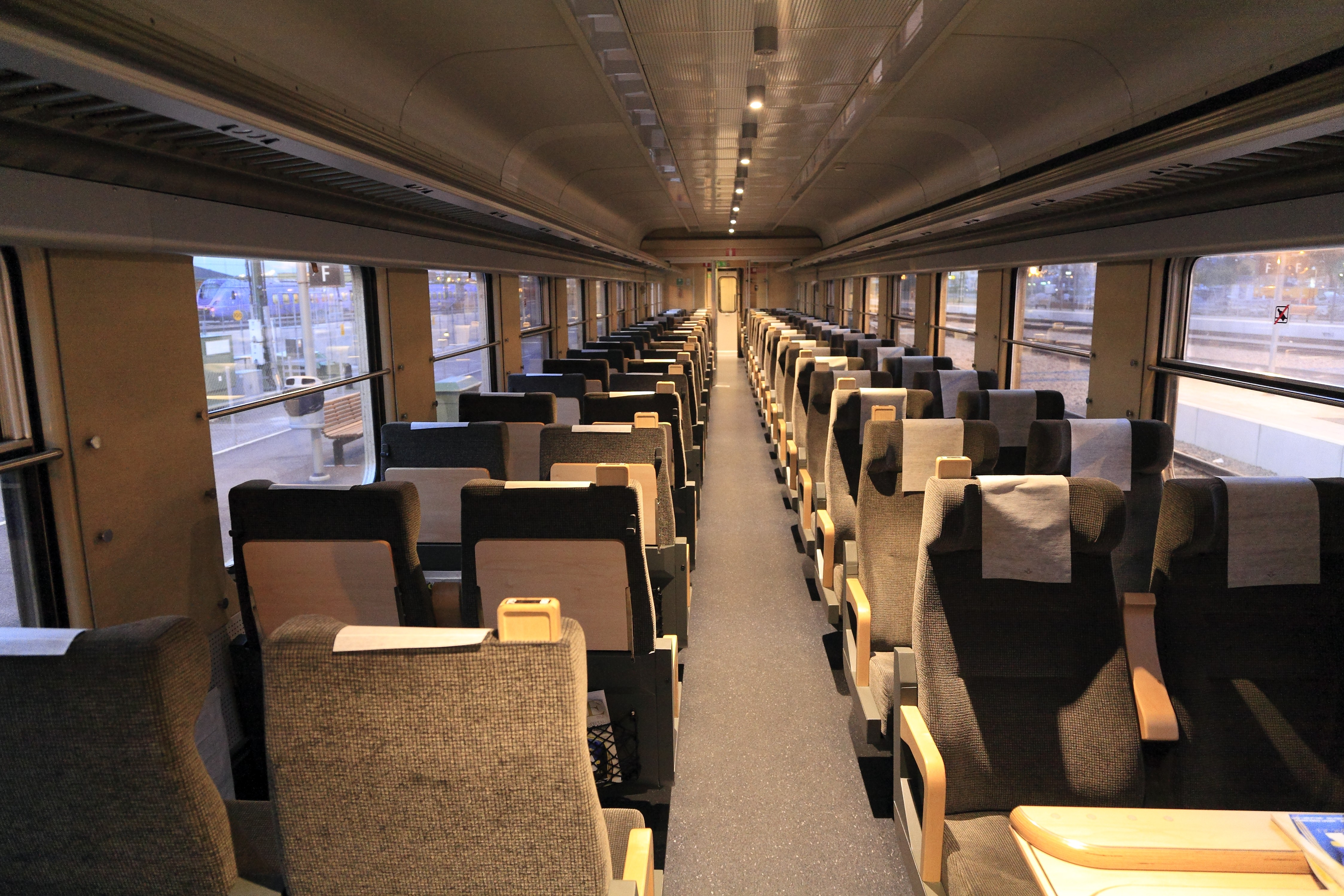
SJ carriage interior

=== Future ===
==== Alstom Zefiro Express (X250) ====
25 high-speed Zefiro Express high-speed trains (SJ X250), scheduled to enter service in 2027, will operate on routes including Stockholm–Malmö, Stockholm–Gothenburg, and be certified for cross-border services to Denmark and Norway. The trains, with a top speed of 250 km/h, and are designed to handle running at temperatures of -40 degrees. The contract, valued at SEK 7 billion (EUR 630 million), was awarded to Bombardier (now part of Alstom) by SJ in 2021. The trains are constructed in China and finalised at the Alstom plant in Hennigsdorf, Germany. The first units started testing in 2026 in Germany, and are expected to enter service in December 2027 according to Petter Essén, Head of Strategic Planning at SJ.

==== CAF Civity Nordic (X45) ====
25 CAF Civity Nordic (SJ X45), scheduled to enter service in 2027, will operate on regional routes including Stockholm-Västerås-Örebro-Skövde-Gothenburg, Linköping-Norrköping-Stockholm-Arlanda-Uppsala-Gävle-Ljusdal and Kalmar-Gothenburg. The trains are designed for cold weather conditions in Sweden, and can operate with a top speed of 200 km/h. The contract, valued at EUR 300 million, was awarded to CAF by SJ in 2022, the first units were expected to arrive in Sweden for testing in 2025 and enter revenue service in 2026. The project is as of April 2026 running one year behind schedule and will be delivered in autumn 2027.

=== Summary table 2021 ===
Image	Type	Class	In fleet	On order	Usage	Notes
	Electric locomotive	SJ Rc6	109		Night-train, Intercity, Regional	SJ units painted black, Trafikverket night train units painted in red and silver.
	Electric multiple unit	SJ X2	36 (Complete sets)		High-speed (X 2000)	Under refurbishment. Trains with a black front are refurbished trains.
	Electric multiple unit	SJ X55	20		High-speed (SJ 3000)	Used on high-speed lines to northern Sweden (Sundsvall and Umeå), Karlstad, Oslo and Borås from Stockholm, as well as Gothenburg-Malmö.
	Electric multiple unit	SJ X40	42 (15 two car units, 27 three car units)		Regional	The X40 trainsets come in both 2-car and 3-car variations. 27 X40 trainsets (3 car variation) are being refurbished. SJ has the option to refurbish the 15 (or 16?) X40 2 car trainsets.
	Electric multiple unit	SJ X250		25	High-speed	Expected to enter revenue service in 2027 on the Stockholm–Gothenburg corridor.
	Electric multiple unit	SJ X45		25	Regional	Expected to enter revenue service in 2027 on the Stockholm–Västerås and Linköping–Gävle corridors

== Services ==
=== Sleeper services - SJ Nattåg ===
The SJ overnight train services (Swedish: SJ Nattåg) are Rc locomotive-hauled trains with both sleeper wagons as well as standard wagons. All services except for the Stockholm-Malmö route have a bistro wagon.
As of 2022 SJ has in collaboration with DSB and RDC begun to operate night train services between Sweden and Germany through Denmark. Three different locomotives are used due to compatibility issues with the electrification and signaling systems between the three countries.
Within Sweden SJ Rc locomotives are used, and in Denmark DSB EA locomotives are used, and in Germany DB 101 locomotives are used.
The night-trains operate on the following lines:

Trains for Norrland
Route	Train number	Calling at	
Umeå C or Duved to Stockholm C or Gothenburg C	60/64/67/69/70/71/72/73/74/77/79	Duved portion: Åre, Undersåker, Järpen, Krokom, Östersund C, Bräcke, Ånge, Sundsvall C	Umeå portion: Umeå Östra, Nordmaling, Örnsköldsvik C, Kramfors, Härnösand, Sundsvall C
Umeå C or Duved to Stockholm C or Gothenburg C	60/64/67/69/70/71/72/73/74/77/79	The two portions divide/attach at Sundsvall Central.	
Umeå C or Duved to Stockholm C or Gothenburg C	60/64/67/69/70/71/72/73/74/77/79	Stockholm portion (all stops set-down only): Hudiksvall, Söderhamn, Gävle C, Uppsala C, Arlanda C	Gothenburg portion (all stops set-down only): Örebro C, Hallsberg, Skövde C, Herrljunga
Main Line South
Route	Train number	Calling at	
Malmö C to Stockholm C	1/2	Hässleholm, Alvesta, Nässjö C, Linköping C, Norrköping C	
SJ EuroNight
Route	Train number	Calling at	
Stockholm C to Berlin Hbf	345/346	Stockholm C, Norrköping C, Linköping C, Nässjö C, Alvesta, Hässleholm, Lund C, Malmö C, Copenhagen Airport, Padborg, Hamburg Hbf, Berlin Hbf; Stops within Sweden are pick-up only if the train starts from Stockholm	

=== SJ InterCity ===
The InterCity services are Rc-hauled trains with standard-seating carriages in both first and second class. There is always a bistro car available in the trainset.

Lines with InterCity service:

Dalarna
Route	tpd	Calling at	Stock
Stockholm C to Mora via Borlänge C	2	Arlanda C (pickup only), Uppsala C (pickup only), Sala, Avesta Krylbo, Hedemora, Säter, Borlänge C, Djurås, Gagnef, Insjön, Leksand, Tällberg, Rättvik, Mora	Rc6
Stockholm C to Falun C via Borlänge C	2	Arlanda C (pickup only), Uppsala C (pickup only), Sala, Avesta Krylbo, Hedemora, Säter, Borlänge C	Rc6
Main Line North
Route	tpd	Calling at	Stock
Stockholm C to Östersund C and Duved	2	Arlanda C (pickup only), Uppsala C (pickup only), Gävle C, Bollnäs, Järvsö, Ljusdal, Ånge, Bräcke, Östersund C, Krokom, Järpen, Undersåker, Åre, Duved	Rc6 or X55
Värmland and Norway
Route	tpd	Calling at	Stock
Stockholm C to Karlstad C and Oslo S	3	Södertälje South, Katrineholm, Hallsberg, Degerfors, Kristinehamn, Karlstad C, Arvika, Kongsvinger	Rc6 or X55
Route	tph	Calling at	Stock
East Coast Line / South Main Line
Gävle C to Linköping C	1	Tierp, Uppsala C, Arlanda C, Stockholm C, Flemingsberg, Södertälje South, Norrköping C Limited InterCity service Ljusdal - Linköping and Sundsvall-Linköping	X40

=== SJ Regional ===
Most of the SJ Regional network was concentrated in the area around lake Mälaren. Operated with either Rc-hauled trainsets, X12/X14 or X40 EMUs. These trains have no catering on board. The X40 is equipped with free 4G WiFi. Both first and second-class are usually offered. Most of this network has been incorporated into the new Mälartåg franchise, although some services remain outside of it.

In Feb 2026, Västtrafik, Hallandstrafiken and Jönköpings Länstrafik awarded SJ an 11-year contract to continue operating the Västtågen regional train system from 12 December 2027.

Routes listed below are the satellite routes which are not subject to franchising.

SJ Regionaltåg
Route	tph	Calling at	Stock
Stockholm C to Hallsberg and Gothenburg C via Västerås	2	Sundbyberg, Bålsta, Enköping, Västerås C, Köping, Arboga, Örebro C, Örebro South, Kumla, Hallsberg, Laxå, Töreboda, Skövde C, Falköping C, Herrljunga, Vårgårda, Alingsås	X40
Gothenburg C to Karlstad C via Åmål	1tp2h	Trollhättan, Öxnered, Mellerud, Åmål, Säffle, Grums, Kil	X52
Gothenburg C to Kalmar C	4tpd	Borås C, Limmared, Hestra, Gnosjö, Värnamo, Alvesta, Växjö, Lessebo, Emmaboda, Nybro	Rc6

==== Franchised operations ====
SJ operate a couple of regional rail franchises held by public transport authorities around the country. The most significant of these are Mälartåg and Västtågen serving the Mälaren valley and the region of West Götaland respectively. SJ AB also started operating the Öresundståg franchise for the 2020 timetable, taking over from Transdev. But due to serious inconsistencies between partners the contract will be terminated as of December 2022 where Transdev will take over again.

MTR took over the Mälartåg contract in December 2021.

Västtågen
Route	tph	Calling at	Stock
Gothenburg C to Töreboda	2	Alingsås, Vårgårda, Herrljunga, Floby, Falköping C, Stenstorp, Skövde C some trains extend to Töreboda; Some trains originate/terminate at Nässjö reversing at Falköping C	X52
Nässjö C to Skövde C or Gothenburg C	2	Forserum, Tenhult, Huskvarna, Jönköping C, Bankeryd, Habo, Mullsjö, Sandhem, Falköping C Some through services to Gothenburg (see above)	X52
Gothenburg C to Uddevalla and Strömstad	2	Ytterby, Kode, Stora Höga, Stenugnsund, Svenshögen, Ljungskile, Uddevalla East, Uddevalla C, Munkedal, Dingle, Hällevadsholm, Rabbalshede, Tanum, Överby, Skee	X11/X12/X14/X52
Uddevalla C to Borås C via Herrljunga	2	Öxnered, Vänersborg C, Vargön, Grästorp, Vara, Vedum, Herrljunga, Ljung, Torpåkra, Mollaryd, Borgstend, Fristad, Viskafors; Services continue to Varberg (see below).	X11/X12/X14
Borås C to Varberg	2	Viskafors, Fritsla, Kinna, Assberg, Skene, Berghem, Björketorp, Horred, Veddige, Derome, Tofta	X11/X12/X14
Gothenburg commuter rail
Route	tph	Calling at	Stock
Gothenburg C to Alingsås	2	Sävenäs, Partille, Jonsered, Aspen, Aspedalen, Stenkullen, Floda, Norsesund, Västra Bodarna Alingsås	X12/X61
Gothenburg C to Älvängen	2	Gamlestaden, Surte, Bohus, Nödinge, Nol, Älvängen	X12/X61
Gothenburg C to Kungsbacka	2	Mölndal Central, Kållered, Lindome, Anneberg, [Kungsbacka] Hede, Kungsbacka	X12/X61

The stretch Malmö Central to Copenhagen Central is operated 50/50 alongside Danish State Railways (DSB) and Copenhagen to Østerport/Nivå by DSB only.

The initial contract for the Mälartåg franchise states that the operator may use their own fleet [of X12, X40 and X50 stock] until the delivery of ER1 Stadler Dosto 200 EMUs is completed. The Upptåget franchise will be merged into Mälartåg onwards from the 2022 timetable, meaning that services from Gävle gain additional stations inherited from the termination of the Upptåget franchise.

=== SJ higher speed trains ===
SJ higher speed trains (Swedish: SJ Snabbtåg) are X2 or X55 trains operating on the main routes in Sweden. The trains are equipped with WiFi and have a bistro.

West Coast
Route	tph	Calling at	Stock
Gothenburg C to Copenhagen H	10	Varberg, Halmstad C, Helsingborg C, Lund C, Malmö C, Copenhagen Airport	X55
East Coast
Route	tph	Calling at	Stock
Stockholm C to Sundsvall C and Umeå C	1tp2h	Arlanda C (pickup only), Uppsala C (pickup only), Gävle C, Söderhamn, Hudiksvall, Sundsvall C, Härnösand, Kramfors, Örnsköldsvik C, Umeå East, Umeå C Some trains originate/terminate at Sundsvall on weekends	X55
Main Line North
Route	tph	Calling at	Stock
Stockholm C to Östersund C and Duved via Gävle C and Bollnäs	1tp2h	Arlanda C (pickup only), Uppsala C (pickup only), Gävle C, Ockelbo, Bollnäs, Järvsö, Ljusdal, Ånge, Bräcke, Östersund C, Undersåker, Åre, Duved	X55 or Rc6
Main Line West
Route	tph	Calling at	Stock
Stockholm C to Gothenburg C (not all services stop at all stations)	1tp2h	Södertälje South, Katrineholm, Hallsberg, Skövde C, Herrljunga	X2
Stockholm C to Trollhättan limited service	1tpd	Södertälje South, Katrineholm, Hallsberg, Skövde C, Herrljunga, Gothenburg	X2
Borås C to Stockholm C limited service	2tpd	Herrljunga C, Falköping C, Skövde C, Hallsberg C	X55
Main Line South
Route	tpd	Calling at	Stock
Stockholm C to Malmö C	14	Södertälje South, Katrineholm, Norrköping C, Linköping C, Nässjö C, Alvesta, Hässleholm, Eslöv, Lund	X2
Stockholm C to Jönköping C limited service	1	Södertälje South, Katrineholm, Norrköping C, Linköping C, Nässjö C	X2
Värmland
Route	tpd	Calling at	Stock
Stockholm C to Karlstad C or Oslo S	1 (Karlstad); 4 (Oslo)	Södertälje South, Katrineholm, Hallsberg, Degerfors, Kristinehamn, (Karlstad, Arvika, Lillestrøm)	X2, X55, or Rc6 (the latter two operate to Oslo)

Stops at Arlanda and Uppsala are for boarding northbound or alighting southbound respectively, although passengers with railcards are exempted from this rule. Some services do also allow both boarding and alighting at Arlanda and Uppsala respectively.

=== SJ Norge ===
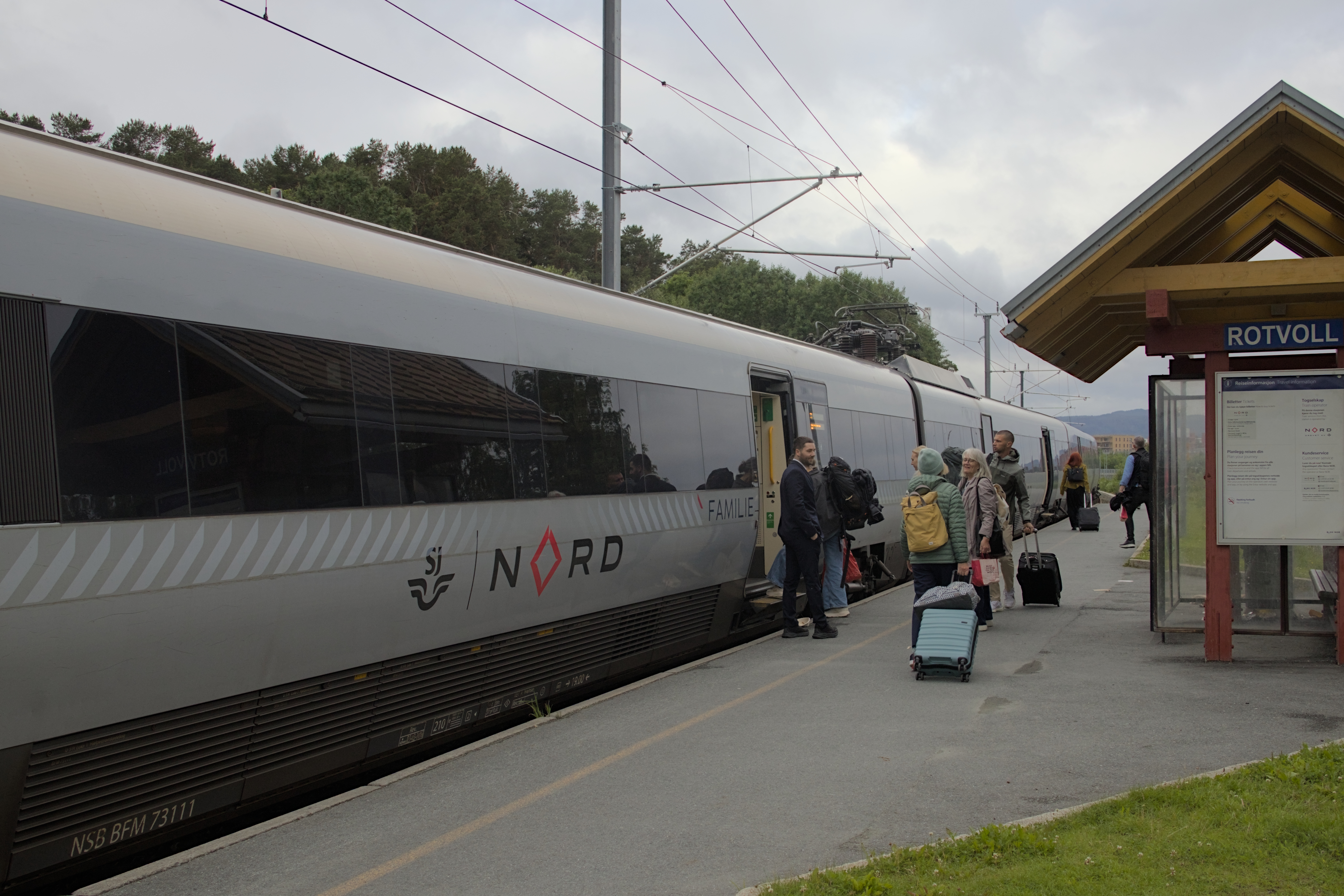
Class 73 train operated by SJ Norge

On 7 June 2020, SJ Norge (trading as SJ NORD) commenced operating services on the Trøndelag Commuter Rail, as well as the Meråker, Røros, Rauma, Nordland, the Saltpendel Line and the Dovre Regional Line under a 10-year contract with the Norwegian Railway Directorate.

SJ operates trains owned by Norske Tog (Norwegian Trains) and these are:

- Class 76 Stadler FLIRT Bio-Modes (hybrid electric EMUs) as well as Di 4 diesel-electric locomotives and Class 92 Duewag DMUs
- EL18 electric locomotives, Class 93 Bombardier Talent DMUs, and Class 73 ADtranz EMUs.

The rail routes SJ Norge operate are:

- Steinkjer – Trondheim Central
- Steinkjer – Lerkendal/Trondheim Outskirts
- Steinkjer – Lundamo
- Steinkjer – Melhus
- Lerkendal/Trondheim Outskirts – Trondheim Central
- Trondheim Central – Heimdal
- Trondheim Central – Melhus
- Trondheim Central – Lundamo
- Trondheim Central – Røros
- Trondheim Central – Stjørdal/Værnes Airport
- Heimdal – Storlien (interchange with Norrtåg toward Östersund
- Trondheim Central – Bodø
- Trondheim Central – Mo i Rana
- Trondheim Central – Oslo Central
- Rotvoll – Røros
- Rotvoll – Støren
- Steinkjer – Støren
- Røros – Hamar
- Saltenpendelen

== Ticketing ==
Ticket prices on SJ trains vary, similarly to airfares, with the lowest prices typically available when booking ahead. SJ offers different ticket categories, such as non-rebookable and refundable tickets, each with varying levels of flexibility. Additionally, there are certain discounts for seniors, students, youths, and families.

In September 2023, SJ removed its ticket machines from stations. The machines were phased out due to a decline in customer usage and the machines' reliance on older technology. SJ directs passengers to purchase tickets via their website, the SJ app, or through authorised agents. It is not possible to buy tickets on board SJ's trains. Additionally, since September 2009, passengers are required to carry an identity document while traveling on SJ trains.

== See also ==
- Banverket
- Green Cargo
- List of railway companies
- Nils Ericson, railway pioneer
- Rail transport in Sweden
- Statens Järnvägar (1856–2000)
- Tågkompaniet
- Transportation in Sweden
- Veolia Transport
