= Casino Cosmopol =

Swedish casino company

- Industry: Gambling
- Founded: 1 July 2001
- Fate: Shut down because of falling profitability due to competition from online gambling
- Headquarters: Sweden
- Number of locations: 0 (2025)
- Parent: Svenska Spel
- Website: casinocosmopol.se

Casino Cosmopol was a Swedish company, a subsidiary of Svenska Spel, that had a monopoly on brick and mortar casinos in Sweden. All the profit of the company went to the national treasury of Sweden. In 2025 the company shut down due to falling profitability and land-based casinos becoming illegal in Sweden. Another contributing factor to the law change and closing the casino was the KYC (know your customer) laws restricting cash withdrawals.

== History ==
In 1999 in the old Customs House, Gothenburg it was decided to open four state-involved casinos.

The four casinos opened in:

1. Sundsvall opened on 1 July 2001 — closed in 2020
2. Malmö opened on 8 December 2001 — closed in 2024
3. Gothenburg opened on 31 August 2002 — closed in 2024
4. Stockholm opened on 13 March 2003 — closed in 2025

== Locations ==
The casino at Sundsvall was Sweden's first international casino, opened in July 2001. It was housed in the refurbished old central railway station, built in 1874. In 2012, it was voted Europe's best casino, but it was closed in 2020 since it was no longer profitable.

In Malmö in Skåne County, the casino was located in the center of the city in Kungsparken, and was opened in December 2001. Kungsparken is a large park that surrounds Malmö Castle.

The casino in Gothenburg was opened at the end of August 2002. It was housed in the old Customs House at Packhusplatsen. The building had earlier been used as a poker lounge and had a seating area called Loser's lounge.

In March 2003, the fourth casino was opened in central Stockholm. The casino is located near the Kungsbron (King's bridge) — a continuation of the long street Kungsgatan (King's road). The casino in Stockholm offered table games (including roulette, blackjack, baccarat and sic bo) as well as poker cash-game with limits 10/10 (min buy-in 100/1000) and up to 100/100 (min buy-in 5000–10000).

At the start of 2024, it was announced that Svenska Spel will close down their casinos in Malmö and Gothenburg. These casinos closed on 24 February 2024. The reasoning for the decision seems to be the lack of demand from players as more players move online to gamble. On 2 April 2025, it was announced that Svenska Spel will close down its last casino in Sweden – the one in Stockholm. The casino closed on 25 April 2025.

== Decline and closure ==
In the 2010s, Casino Cosmopol began to experience a steady decline in visitor numbers and profitability. Increased competition from online gambling platforms and changing player preferences significantly reduced revenues.

The COVID-19 pandemic further accelerated the decline, with prolonged closures and restrictions leading to heavy financial losses.

On 24 February 2024, the Malmö and Gothenburg casinos were permanently closed after being deemed unprofitable. In January 2025, Svenska Spel announced that the Stockholm venue would also shut down, with operations ending on 25 April 2025. This marked the complete discontinuation of Casino Cosmopol's land-based operations in Sweden.
