= Dagens Arbete =

Swedish trade union magazine

Dagens Arbete (transl. Today's Labour) is a Swedish trade union magazine for the members of IF Metall, GS and the Swedish Paper Workers' Union. The magazine received the investigative journalism award Guldspaden in 2024 for their article Sanningen om sprängdåden. In 2021 they were awarded for Best Storytelling and Best digital initiative by the national association for the trade union press. Since 2023 Eva Burman is Chief Editor. In 2019 Dagens Arbete launched a new magazine, Dagens Arbetsmiljö, for health and safety officers in the Swedish Trade Union Confederation unions.
