= Coast-to-Coast Line =

Railway in Sweden

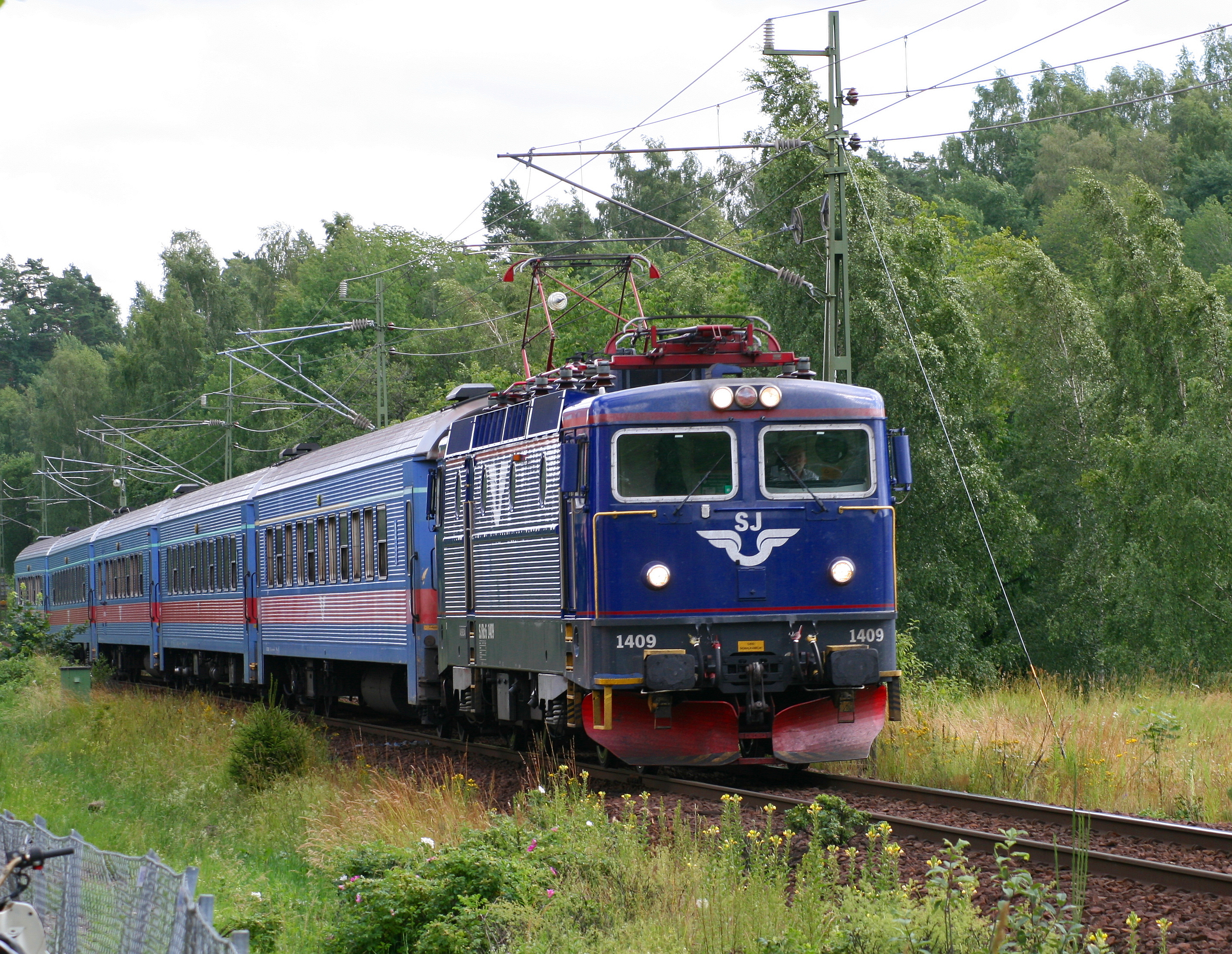
An Rc-hauled InterCity passenger train

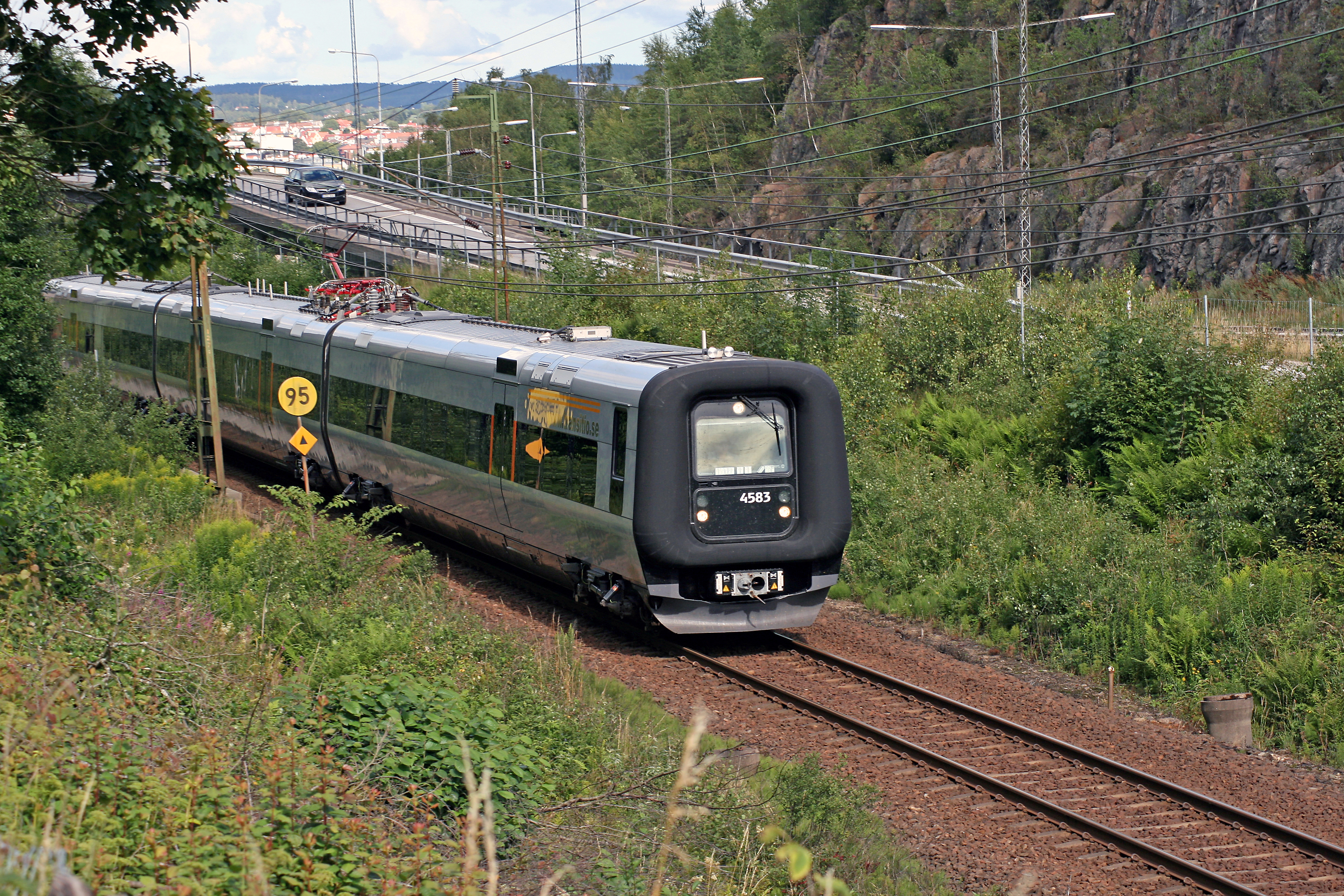
An X31 multiple unit near Borås

The Coast-to-Coast Line (Swedish: Kust till kust-banan) is a 410-kilometre (250 mi) long Y-shaped electric railway line between Gothenburg via Emmaboda to Kalmar and Karlskrona in southern Sweden.

== History ==
The line was built as five different railways: from Gothenburg to Borås, from Borås to Alvesta, from Växjö to Alvesta, from Karlskrona to Växjö and the Kalmar Line. The lines were nationalized in 1940 and 1941 and operations taken over by the Swedish State Railways. By then, the section from Gothenburg to Borås had been electrified. The remaining sections were electrified between 1954 and 1962: from Alvesta to Växjö in 1953, from Växjö to Kalmar in 1954 and from Borås to Alvesta in 1962. SJ T41 locomotives were the most common during the diesel era, and replaced by SJ D and SJ Da locomotives after electrification. The services were also provided with SJ X9 multiple units and later SJ F locomotives. From the 1980s, the line was served by the SJ Rc locomotives.

The section from Gothenburg to Borås has additional local traffic. SJ X7 multiple units were used from the 1960s, and from the 1990s SJ X11, SJ X12, SJ X14 and SJ X53 units have been introduced. In 1990 the section was upgraded and all traffic halted for three months. In 1994, the brand "Coast-to-Coast" was introduced and SJ X2 high-speed trains were introduced. They remained in service until 2002, when Oresundtrains were introduced. In 2007, Regina multiple units were introduced, and then again Rc-hauled trains from 2009.

Between 2010 and 2013, the Swedish Transport Administration upgraded the 57-kilometre (35 mi) section from Emmaboda to Karlskrona, with the goal to reduce travel time from 40 to 33 minutes. The line was out of use from December 2011 to June 2013, with all work being completed in 2014. The upgrades included continuous welded rails, centralized traffic control, a new catenary system, new passing loops at Gullberna and Vissefjärda, upgrade of the passing loops at Spjutsbygd and Holmsjö, new platforms at Holmsjö Station, speeds up to 200 km/h (125 mph), 40 level crossings removed, 8 new tunnels and bridges, new track layout and signaling system at Emmaboda, and a rebuilt Karlskrona Station. The project cost 950 million Swedish krona (SEK).

== Future ==
There are plans to build a new railway on the section between Gothenburg and Borås. This new railway is planned to have a very high standard, prepared for up to 320 km/h. It is planned to be a part of a future high speed railway between Gothenburg and Stockholm, called Götalandsbanan. The first part will be between Mölnlycke and Bollebygd including a tunnel station directly under the Göteborg Landvetter Airport. This project will allow 2-3 trains per hour and direction, compared with 1 train today. This project has a detailed construction plan, and construction was decided to begin 2016. However this project has been put on hold, because of political hesitation over the high speed railway project.
