= T41 =

T41 may refer to:

== Aviation ==
- Cessna T-41 Mescalero, an American trainer aircraft
- Grumman Gulfstream I, pre-production US Navy designation T-41A, redesignated TC-4C
- La Porte Municipal Airport (Texas), FAA location identifier
- Slingsby T.41 Skylark 2, a British glider

== Other uses ==
- T41 (classification), a disability sport classification
- Bugatti Royale, a French luxury car
- Cooper T41, a British racing car
- IBM ThinkPad T41, a laptop
- SJ T41, a Swedish diesel-electric locomotive
- T-41 Light Amphibious Tank, a Soviet tank
- T41 pre-production model of the American M41 Walker Bulldog light tank
- T41, an open source and open hardware software defined radio for amateur radio
