= SJ Mg =

Mg
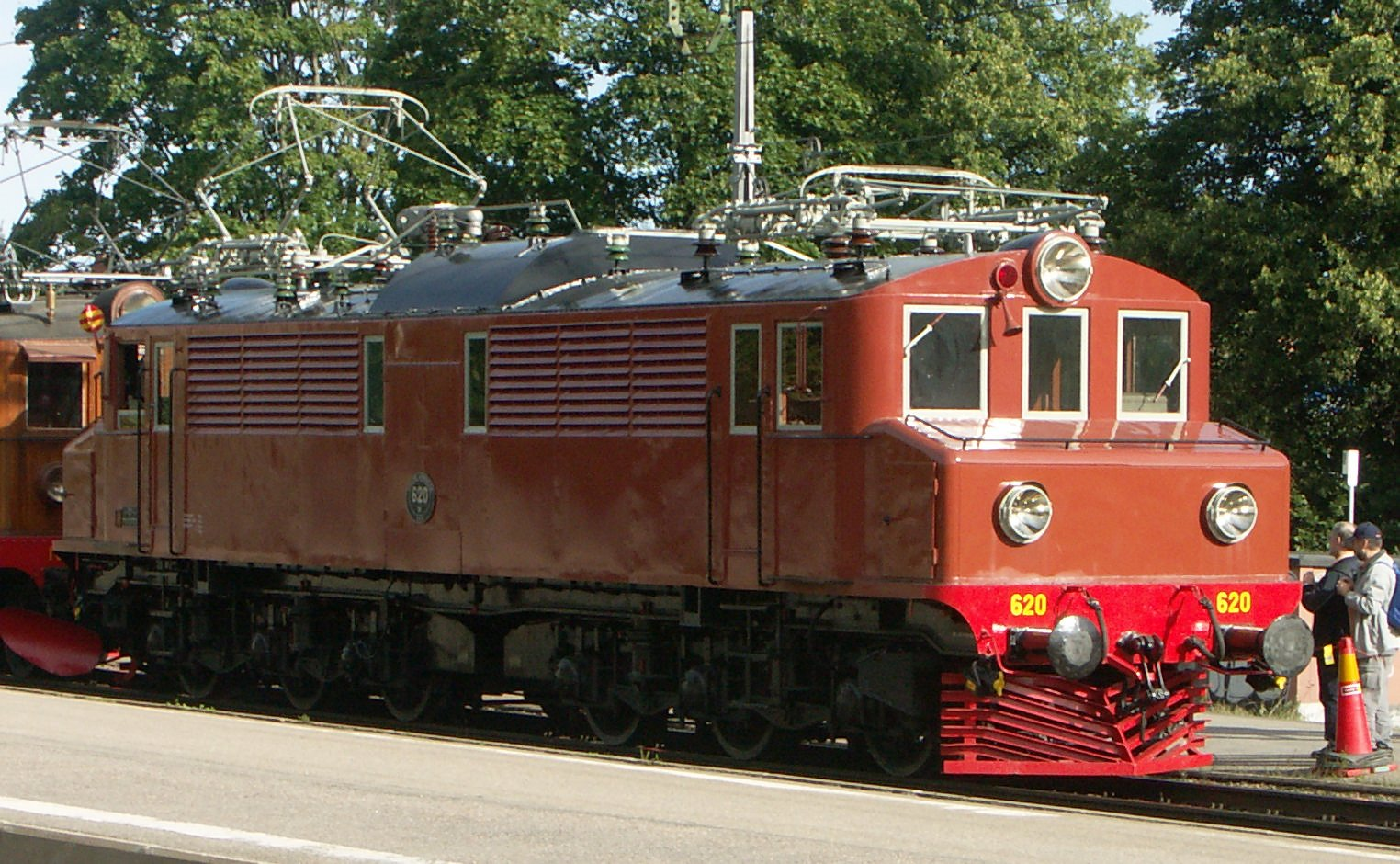
- SJ Mg 620
Type and origin
- Power type: Electric
- Builder: ASEA
- Build date: 1944-1945
- Total produced: 17
Specifications
- Configuration
  - UIC: Co′Co′
- Gauge: 1,435 mm (4 ft 8 1/2 in)
- Wheel diameter: 1,000 mm (39.37 in)
- Length: 16,800 mm (55 ft 1 3/8 in)
- Height: 4,500 mm (14 ft 9 1/8 in)
- Loco weight: 102 tonnes (100 long tons; 112 short tons)
- Electric system/s: 15 kV 16.7 Hz AC Catenary
- Current pickup: Pantograph
Performance figures
- Maximum speed: 80 km/h (50 mph)
- Power output: 2,640 kW (3,540 hp)
- Tractive effort: 300 kN (67,000 lb_{f})
Career
- Operators: Statens Järnvägar

Mg is an electric locomotive used by Swedish State Railways (Swedish: Statens Järnvägar, SJ) for hauling freight trains. It was built in 17 copies by ASEA and was in service until 1980.

The Mg-series was built for the electrification of Norra Stambanan in the 1940s. It was steeper and more curved than the main lines in Southern Sweden, and single-track sections meant that long freight trains had to be used to make best use of line capacity. The D-series was not powerful enough and the Of-series was too long for the curves. But as experience of the building of bogie-locomotives increased, a Co'Co'-design was chosen for Mg, as the first bogie-locomotive in Sweden. More power also meant that the direct current motors from the D-series had to be replaced with the alternating current motors of the F-series. The machine room was not symmetric, so the loco was not the same on the right and left side. The Mg was the basis for the Ma-series built in the 1950s.
