= SJ Ma =

Ma
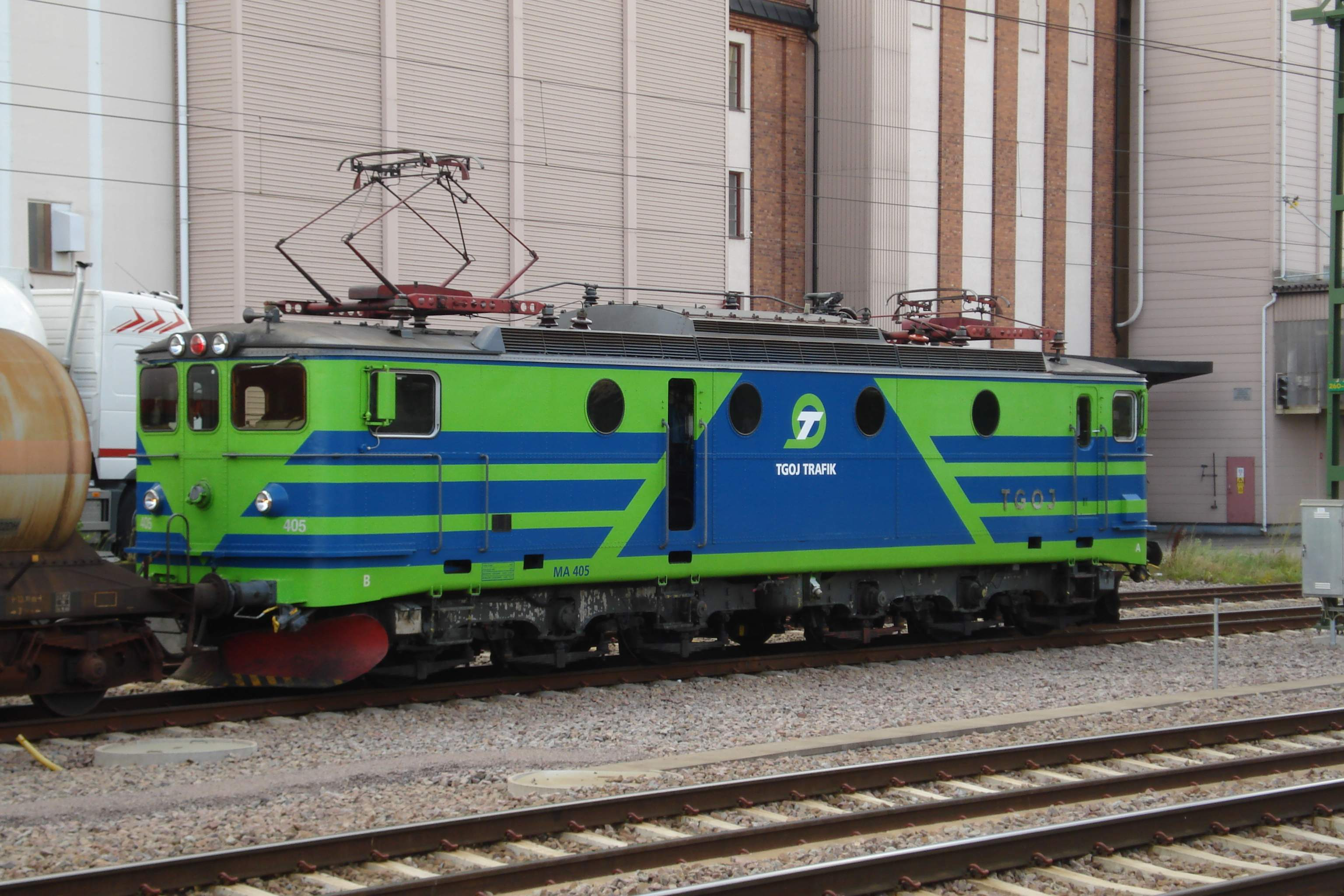
- Ma 405 pulling a copper train at Mjölby in 2007
Type and origin
- Power type: Electric
- Builder: ASEA
- Build date: 1953-1960
- Total produced: 41
Specifications
- Configuration
  - UIC: Co′Co′
- Gauge: 1,435 mm (4 ft 8 1/2 in)
- Wheel diameter: 1,300 mm (51.18 in)
- Length: 16,800 mm (55 ft 1 3/8 in)
- Height: 4,500 mm (14 ft 9 1/8 in)
- Loco weight: 104.4 tonnes (102.8 long tons; 115.1 short tons)
- Electric system/s: 15 kV 16.7 Hz AC Catenary
- Current pickup: Pantograph
Performance figures
- Maximum speed: 100 km/h (62 mph)
- Power output: 3,960 kW (5,310 hp)
- Tractive effort: 376 kN (85,000 lb_{f})
Career
- Operators: Statens Järnvägar, Trafikaktiebolaget; Grängesberg–Oxelösunds Järnvägar

The SJ Class Ma is an electric locomotive used by Swedish State Railways (Swedish: Statens Järnvägar, SJ) and later other railways. 41 units were built by ASEA between 1953 and 1960. It is derived from the older Mg-series, but unlike its predecessor it is used for freight and passenger trains. It is also the longest serving locomotive in Sweden.

== History ==
As freight traffic on the Norrland lines was on the rise towards the end of the 1940s, the need for more and stronger locomotives emerged. As a result SJ decided to develop the Ma series, based on the experience gained from the Mg series. Availability of more powerful motors made the new class capable of hauling heavy trains across a challenging topography at 100 km/h, making the series quite flexible. Equipment was placed inside the locomotive, removing the noses and giving the Ma a very different appearance from the Mg series. ASEA delivered 32 locomotives to SJ, in addition to 9 to TGOJ. It was put into service on passenger and freight trains in Central and Northern Sweden.

TGOJ chose the Ma series when it first started electric operations. Nine locos were delivered from 1954 to 1958, and originally used on iron ore traffic between Ludvika and Oxelösund. They differ from the ones delivered to SJ with that they can be driven in multiple and have round instead of square side windows.

In the mid-1960s it was decided to modernize the Ma-series through rebuilding the drivers cabin and mounting new side windows, in addition to a number of technical improvements.

After the Rc locomotives were delivered in a large numbers to SJ in the early 1970s, the Ma series was restricted to freight only duties due to its comparable low top speed. At the same time the locomotives were modernized at NOHAB in Trollhättan with changes to the bogies, main power switch, front lights and moving the cabin door to the centre to reduce noise. In 1991 SJ sold 25 of its 31 units to TGOJ, though they were infrequently used. Two units were rented to BK Tåg while one was sold to Inlandsgods.

In 2012, Green Cargo who had taken over TGOJ the year prior, decided to take the Ma-locomotives out of service. Most were scrapped, some were sold to heritage railways and other companies, and a few are still in service today.
