= ThinkPad T41 =

The IBM ThinkPad T41 is a laptop from the ThinkPad line that was manufactured by IBM.
