= SJ F =

F
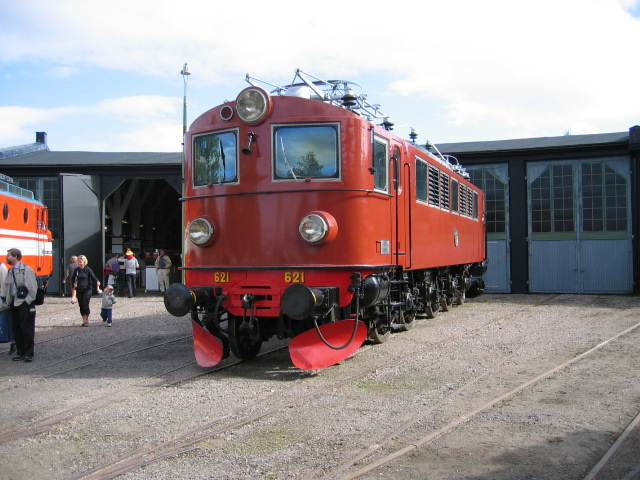
- F 621 at the Swedish Railway Museum
Type and origin
- Power type: Electric
- Builder: ASEA (Electrical pt.) (Note: BBC delivered the main transformer and accessories for the prototype locomotive F 601.); NOHAB (Mechanical pt.); Motala Verkstad (Mechanical pt.); ASJ (Mechanical pt.)
- Build date: 1942–1949
- Total produced: 24
Specifications
- Configuration
  - UIC: 1′Do1′
- Gauge: 1,435 mm (4 ft 8 1/2 in)
- Bogies: Bissel (carrying wheels)
- Leading dia.: 980 mm (38 19/32 in)
- Wheel diameter: 1,530 mm (60 1/4 in)
- Minimum curve: 120 m (390 ft) with caution
- Wheelbase: 11,600 mm (38 ft 11/16 in)
- Length: 15,230 mm (49 ft 11 5/8 in)
- Height: 4,500 mm (14 ft 9 1/8 in)
- Axle load: 17,300 kg (38,100 lb)
  - Leading: 16,500 kg (36,400 lb)
- Adhesive weight: 69,200 kg (152,600 lb) (Note: Corresponds to 679 kN at standard gravity.)
- Loco weight: 102,200 kg (225,300 lb) (Note: The mechanical part: 53,200 kg (117,300 lb); the electrical part: 49,000 kg (108,000 lb).)
- Sandbox cap.: 650 L (23 cu ft) (Note: This volume was reduced between 1964 and 1968.)
- Electric system/s: 15 kV 16 2/3 Hz AC catenary
- Current pickup: Pantograph
- Traction motors: Four ASEA KJ 106 B (Note: The motors were single-phase AC serial motors connected in parallel.)
  - Rating 1 hour: 645 kW (865 hp)
  - Continuous: Unknown (Note: Hinde reported a continuous locomotive power of 2,100 kW (2,820 hp), suggesting a continuous motor power of 525 kW (700 hp).)
- Transmission: Quill drive
- Gear ratio: 31:104
- Air tank cap.: 740 L (26 cu ft)
- Compressor: 2,000 L/min (71 cu ft/min) (Note: The compressor was powered by a 3 kW (4 hp) AC-motor, 16 2/3 Hz. Also, the F-locomotive had an auxiliary compressor delivering 130 L/min (4.6 cu ft/min) powered by a 0.55 kW (0.74 hp) DC-motor that could be run on battery power. The locomotive main breaker was powered by pressurized air and was depended on the auxiliary compressor. The pantographs could be raised with the auxiliary compressor as well.)
Performance figures
- Maximum speed: 135 km/h (84 mph) (Note: The maximum allowed speed was reduced to 100 km/h (62 mph) at the end of its service life, operating in the Stockholm region.)
- Power output
  - 1 hour: 2,580 kW (3,460 hp)
  - Continuous: 2,100 kW (2,820 hp)
- Tractive effort
  - Starting: 203 kN (45,600 lbf) or 175 kN (39,300 lbf) at normal adhesion (Note: SJ rated the F-locomotive at 18,000 kgf (177 kN; 39,683 lbf) and Hinde reported 38,500 lbf (171 kN).)
  - 1 hour: 91 kN (20,500 lbf) at 92 km/h (57 mph) (Note: SJ rated the F-locomotive at 9,700 kgf (95 kN; 21,385 lbf) at 95 km/h (59 mph) and Hinde reported 26,650 lbf (119 kN) at 32 mph (51 km/h).)
- Factor of adh.
  - Starting: 3.3 (30%) or 3.9 (26%) at normal adhesion
Career
- Operators: Statens Järnvägar
- Numbers: 601–603, 621–632, 694–702
- Locale: Initial: Stockholm–Gothenburg –Malmö–Stockholm; Later: Stockholm–Oslo; East Coast Line; Stockholm–Eskilstuna; Gothenburg–Kalmar/Karlskrona
- Except for factors of adhesion, the data are according to Nordin if no in-line citations are made. Factors of adhesion were calculated using the above data.

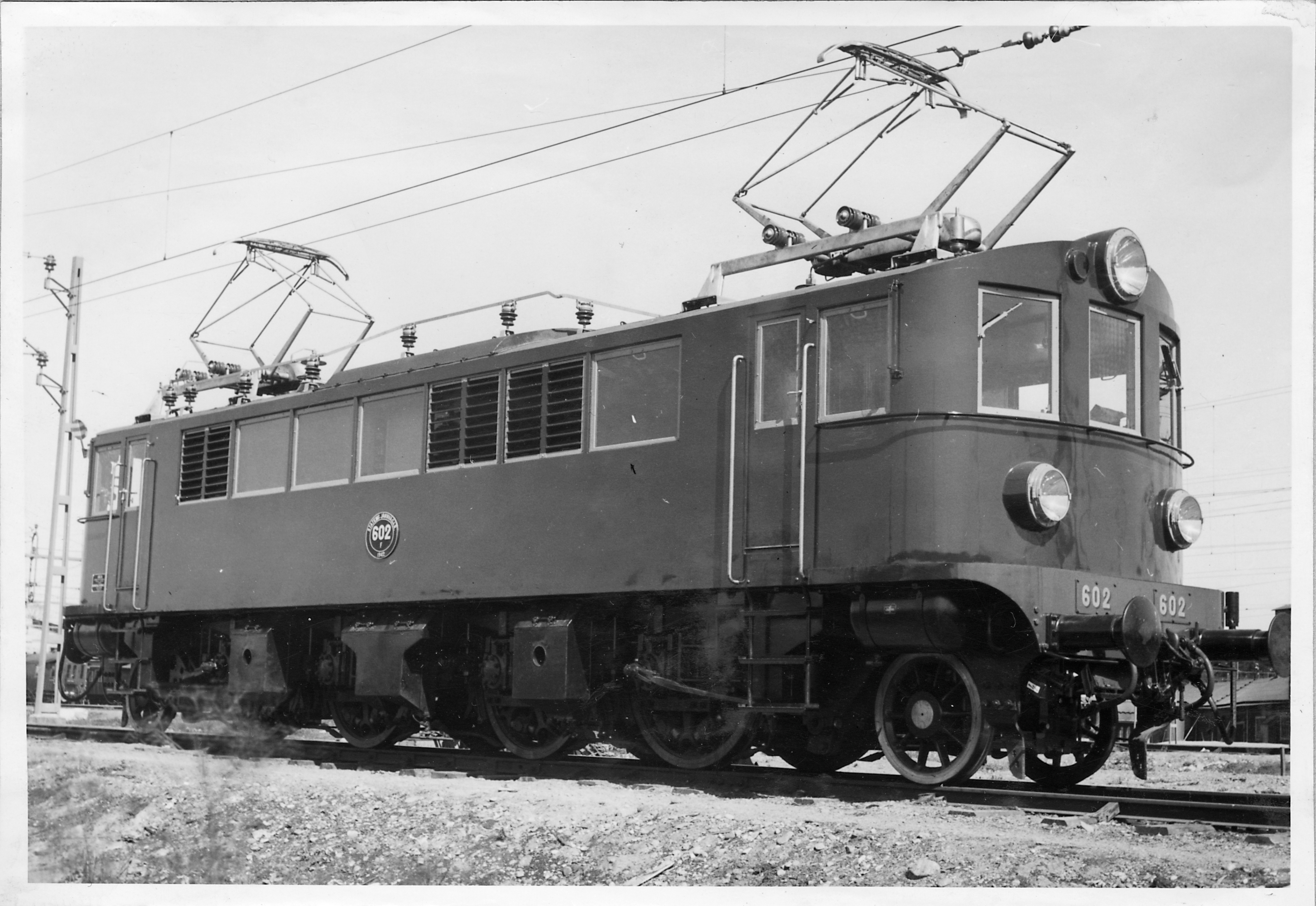
Prototype locomotive F 602 with three front windows. (Note: Courtesy: Järnvägsmuseet (Photographer: P. Östner))

Littera F was a class of electric locomotives operated by the Swedish state railways (SJ) between 1942 and 1983. Twenty-four F-locomotives were constructed and delivered between 1942 and 1949. The design was a rigid-framed locomotive with quill drive and the axle arrangement 1′Do1′, inspired by the German type E 18. The F-locomotives pulled express passenger trains and express freight trains.

== History ==
SJ decided in the late 1930s to rebuild the single-track mainline routes Stockholm-Gothenburg (Västra Stambanan) and Katrineholm-Malmö into double-track lines and hence increasing the maximum allowed speed to 120 km/h (75 mph). At the time, no locomotive at SJ was capable of reaching that speed and SJ decided to develop a new rigid-framed electric locomotive with quill drive and the axle arrangement 1′Do1′, inspired by the German type E 18.

A traditional design with jackshaft drive and connecting rods with 3 or 4 powered axles was considered, based on the type D-locomotive, but was abandoned in favor of the quill design. The main objection was that only two motors each developing 1,050 kW (1,410 hp) could be mounted on the locomotive frame with jackshaft drive while the quill drive offered the possibility to mount four motors, each developing 645 kW (865 hp) in the final design. At first, SJ was reluctant to single-shaft powered locomotives due to issues regarding wheel slip, but German and Swiss locomotive manufacturers had convinced SJ that this apprehension was exaggerated. Also, the German and Swiss manufacturers recommended SJ to plan for a locomotive design covering future needs regarding power and speed, which favored the quill design.

Three prototype locomotives were ordered in 1939 and delivered in 1942 with road numbers 601-603. The prototype locomotives differed in many technical details to evaluate different technical solutions. For example, F 601 and F 603 were equipped quill-and-cup transmission according to Secheron, while F 602 was equipped with quill-and-spring transmission according to AEG. The carrying wheel bogies differed; F 601 and F 602 had Krauss bogies while the F 603 had Bissel bogies.

The first production series was ordered in 1943 and twelve F-locomotives were delivered between 1945 and 1946 with road numbers 621-632. The second and last production series was delivered between 1948 and 1949 and consisted of nine F-locomotives with road numbers 694-702. The production series were largely based on prototype F 603 with some changes. For example, the AEG quill-and-spring transmission was chosen, and only two front windows with broader dimensions were installed instead of three narrower.

The three prototype locomotives were rebuilt into production series specifications between 1953 and 1957. Some original design features were left alone, for example, the prototypes retained their straight buffer beams. The production series locomotives had slightly arced buffer beams.

Between 1964 and 1968, the F-locomotives were rebuilt. For example, the driver's cab was improved, and the sandbox capacity was reduced. Also, the number of sand delivery pipes were reduced, only delivering sand in front of the first set of driving wheels in the direction of travel. Before the rebuilding, sand delivery pipes were in front of all eight driver wheels in both directions of travel. Some brake equipments were changed as well, lowering the locomotive weight to 100,000 kg (220,000 lb) and the weight on drivers to 68,000 kg (150,000 lb). The weights in the information box refers to the production series locomotives before the rebuilding program.

In the late 1960s, the express passenger trains and express freight trains pulled by the F-locomotives were replaced by the thyristor-controlled Bo′Bo′ locomotives littera Rc on the triangle route Stockholm-Gothenburg-Malmö-Stockholm. The F-locomotives then entered service on the routes Stockholm-Oslo, Stockholm-Eskilstuna, Gothenburg-Kalmar/Karlskrona, and the East Coast Line.

The F-locomotives were withdrawn from service between 1978 and 1983. F 699 was destroyed beyond repair at a collision in 1972.

Three F-locomotives are preserved; F 621 is owned by a public museum in Gävle, Sweden, while F 696 and F 701 are owned by a private association running roundhouses and vintage rolling stock in Sala, Krylbo and Hagalund, Sweden.

== Driving the locomotive ==
The driver supervised the performance of the traction motors by a voltmeter and by two ammeters. The first ammeter presented the mean current of the four traction motors, while the second presented any difference in amperage between the traction motors; a difference suggested wheel slip.

The master controller had only four positions and actuated a DC-motor manouvering a tap changer with 40 running points. The tap changer was connected to the main transformer primary at 40 different transformer windings. By increasing the windings of the primary, the output voltage on the transformer secondary increased and hence the traction motor power. When the driver moved the controller to the up position, the tap changer running points increased successively and by moving the controller to the hold position, the tap changer stopped at the approaching running point. By moving the controller to the return position, the tap changer running points decreased successively and could be stopped in the same fashion as above. The traction motor current was cut off by moving the controller to the zero position. By using a DC powered motor, the tap changer could be actuated on internal battery power when the pantographs were down, or the main breaker was disconnected.

Drivers were instructed not to exceed ca 2,600 amperes of motor current when starting the locomotive, only reaching 2,800 amperes at exceptional situations. As soon as a suitable starting current was obtained, the master controller was moved into the hold position. It was advised not to use more current than necessary, and then keep the starting current at a constant level as possible by changing the running points gradually. At the end of the starting period, the current was allowed to decrease slightly. The motor voltage had to be monitored as well, not exceeding 430 volts. When the motor current was less than 1,650 amperes, the motor voltage was allowed to reach 450 volts.

When starting a train at a gradient, drivers were instructed to release the train brake while maintaining the locomotive brake. When the train brake was released, the driver moved the controller to the up position while releasing the locomotive brake at the same time.

When running the locomotive on level track, drivers were encouraged to find a suitable running point to keep a steady-state avoiding frequent movement of the controller, only adjusting the controller with regards to the track conditions.

Both the locomotive air brake and the train air brake acted on all driver wheels with a braking effort of 175% of the adhesive weight at speeds above 55 km/h (34 mph) and 70% below that speed.
