= SJ T41 =

Swedish diesel-electric locomotive

T41
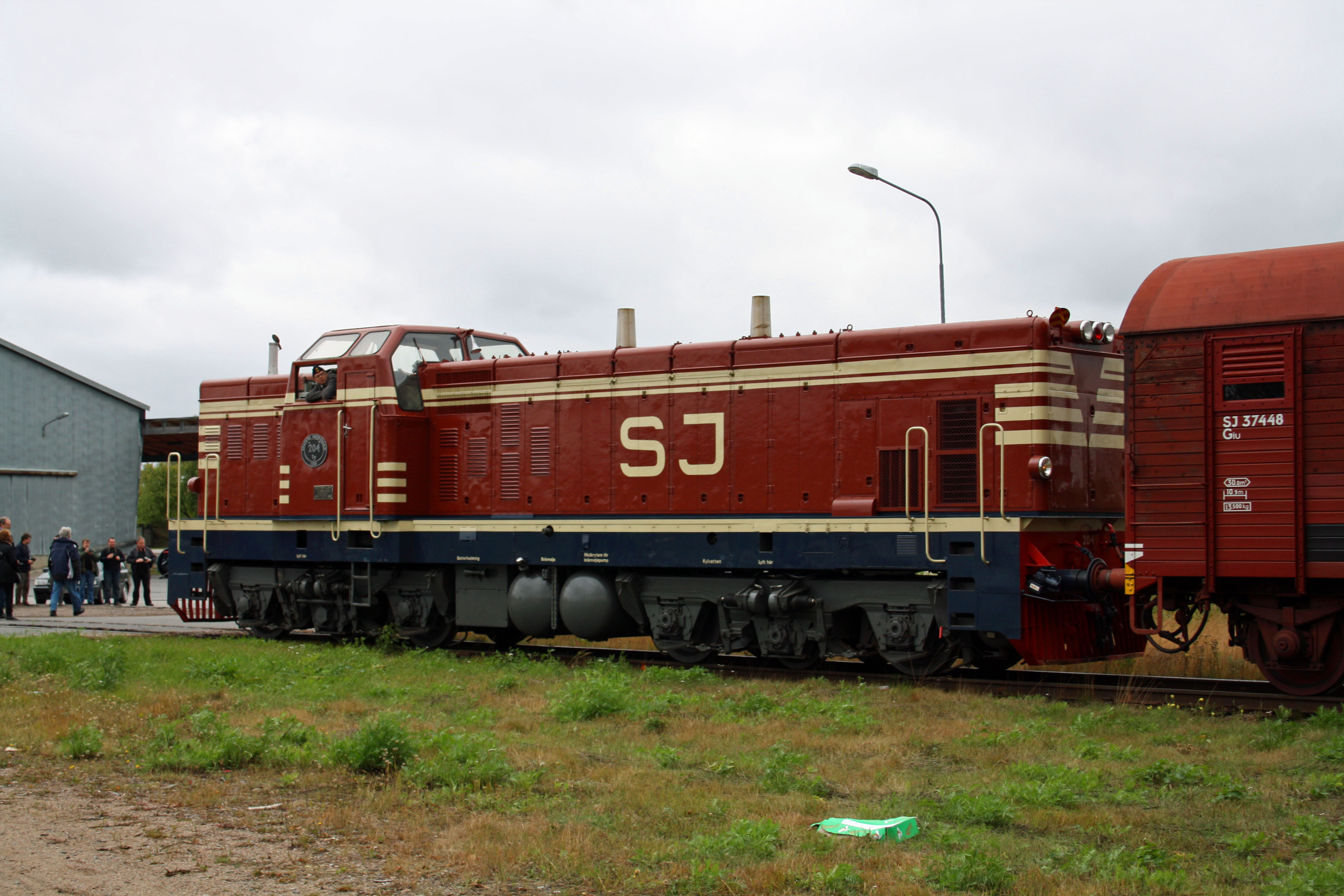
Type and origin
- Power type: Diesel-electric
- Designer: Electro-Motive Division
- Builder: NOHAB
- Build date: 1956
- Total produced: 5
Specifications
- Configuration
  - UIC: (A1A)(A1A)
- Gauge: 1,435 mm (4 ft 8 1/2 in)
- Length: 15,400 mm (50 ft 6 1/4 in)
- Loco weight: 84 tonnes (83 long tons; 93 short tons) tare weight
- Prime mover: EMD 12-567C
- Engine type: two-stroke diesel
- Transmission: Electric
Performance figures
- Maximum speed: 100 km/h (62 mph)
- Power output: 1,065 kW (1,428 hp)
Career
- Operators: Statens Järnvägar
- Numbers: 200 - 204

T41 was a type of diesel-electric locomotive used by Swedish State Railways (Swedish: Statens Järnvägar, SJ) between 1956 and 1988 for secondary line services and later for shunting. It was built by Nydquist & Holm (NOHAB), who produced five locomotives under licence from General Motors Electro-Motive Division.

== History ==
During the 1950s NOHAB of Trollhättan had started a cooperation with General Motors Electro-Motive Division to licence build GM-EMD diesel locomotives for the European market. SJ had bought one EMD G12 locomotive, retrospectively designated T42, in 1953 and after NOHAB had started building the DSB class MY and MX for Danske Statsbaner in 1953 SJ ordered five modified G12 locomotives in 1955 with delivery in 1956. They were originally designated T4, but this was later changed to T41.

The T41 allowed replacement of steam locomotives on non electrified lines. It served on Borås-Alvesta and Borlänge-Mora, and served both passenger and freight trains. In 1978 Siljansbanan was electrified and three T41s were retired while two were moved to Östersund with service on Inlandsbanan, and served until the 1988. Two are preserved by the Swedish Railway Museum.

== Technical Description ==
The T41 had six axles using an A1A-A1A wheel arrangement and was powered by a GM EMD 12-567C twelve-cylinder, two-stroke cycle, diesel prime mover which produced a power output of 1,065 kW (1,428 hp). Like the G12, the T41 uses a long hood and off-centre cab. However its hood is slightly lower and its cab is enlarged and taller than that of the G12.
