= SJ Rc =

Swedish electric locomotive class

Rc
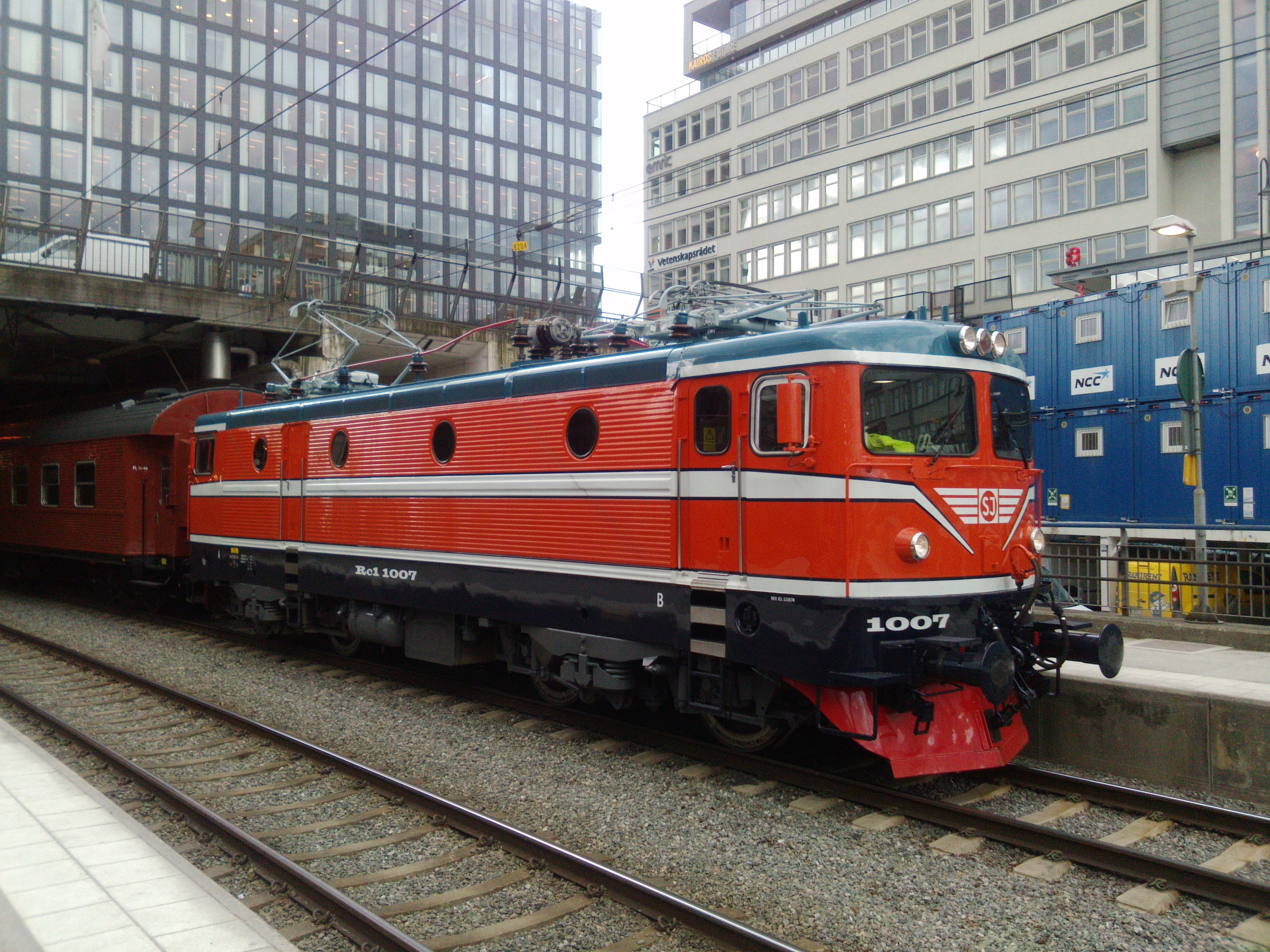
- The first Rc locomotive for SJ in the 1970s retro livery
Type and origin
- Power type: Electric
- Builder: ASEA
- Build date: 1967–1988
- Total produced: 366
Specifications
- Configuration
  - UIC: Bo′Bo′
- Gauge: 1,435 mm (4 ft 8 1/2 in) standard gauge
- Wheel diameter: 1,300 mm (51.18 in)
- Length: 15,400 mm (50 ft 6 1/4 in)
- Loco weight: 80 t (79 long tons; 88 short tons) (Rc1); 76.8 t (75.6 long tons; 84.7 short tons) (Rc2, 3); 78 t (77 long tons; 86 short tons) (Rc4, 6, 7)
- Electric system/s: 15 kV 16.7 Hz AC Catenary
- Current pickup: Pantograph
Performance figures
- Maximum speed: 135 km/h (84 mph) (Rc1, 2, 4, 5); 160 km/h (99 mph) (Rc3, 6); 180 km/h (112 mph) (Rc7)
- Power output: 3,600 kW (4,800 hp)
- Tractive effort: 275 kN (62,000 lb_{f}) (Rc1, 2); 235 kN (53,000 lb_{f}) (Rc3, 6); 290 kN (65,000 lb_{f}) (Rc4)

The Rc class is a family of electric locomotives built in Sweden by Allmänna Svenska Elektriska Aktiebolaget (ASEA). The Rc is the most produced locomotive in Sweden with 366 units and is used on both passenger and freight services originally for SJ, they have since been mostly sold to other operators such as Green Cargo, Tågab, Hector Rail and Trafikverket.

== History ==
The Rc-model emerged from ASEA in the 1960s. It first appeared in 1967 to replace the older D-locomotives. Notably, ASEA facility manager and head engineer Tore Nordin was involved in designing and developing the Rc locomotive at ASEA. The initial Rc models are notable for using thyristors instead of the older relay-based system. The Rc locomotive was developed from the experimental SJ Rb locomotive produced in the early 1960s. Both the Rc, the Rb and the Rc derivative SJ Rm use thyristor-controlled DC motors instead of a more traditional relay-based system.

As of 2026, Rc-locomotives are still used in Sweden on both passenger and freight lines, mostly on freight services with passenger services gradually being replaced with EMUs such as the X40.

== Versions ==
Altogether, there have been nine versions of the Rc-locomotive in Sweden, including the freight locomotive Rm designed to pull iron ore trains. Rc1, Rc2, Rc4, and Rc5 have a maximum allowed speed of 135 km/h. Rc3 and Rc6 have a maximum allowed speed of 160 km/h. Rc7 was a rebuild of Rc6 meant to haul replacement trains needed when the X 2000 trains were canceled or delayed. Rc7 had a maximum allowed speed of 180 km/h. However, the maximum speed permitted without emergency electromagnetic track brakes is 160 km/h, and refitting old carriages was considered too expensive. For that reason all Rc7 were subsequently converted back to Rc6. The Rd2/Rde variant is an upgraded Rc2 in operation with Green Cargo. Rc1–Rc7 all weigh between 75 and 80 tonnes, whilst the Rm weighs 90 tonnes. The Rm's top speed is only 100 km/h and are more powerful locomotives.

=== Rc 1 ===
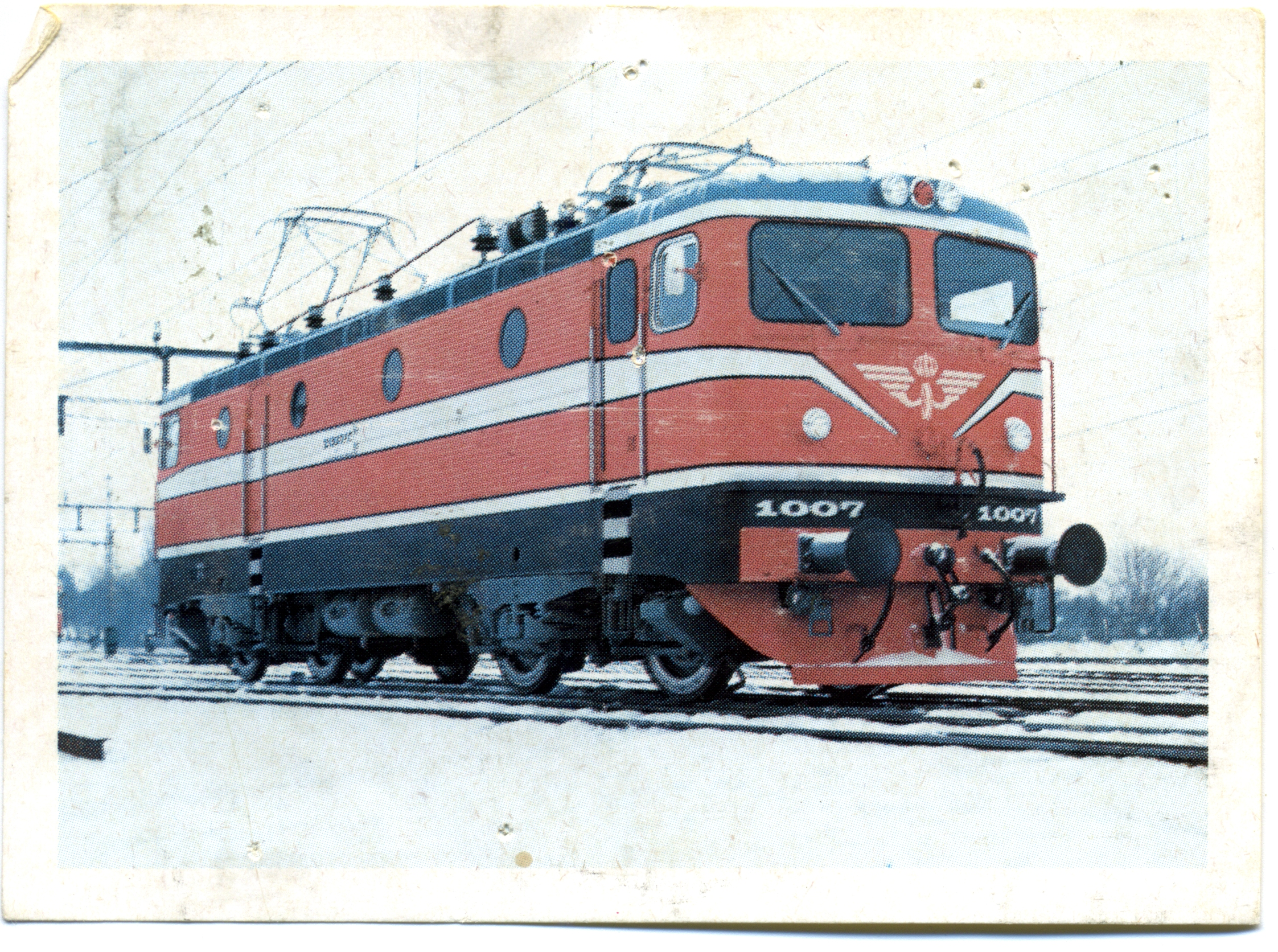
The first Rc locomotive in January 1967 before delivery

The first variant of the Rc series, they were delivered to SJ with start in 1967, they were built using what had been learned with the experimental Rb locomotives. The locomotives used direct current motors, with the current being directed by thyristors intead of relays. This reduced the risk for slipping and made it possible to hold a constant speed. The thyristors were cheaper to maintain than relays which lowered maintenance costs. A total of twenty locomotives where built originally with the class only being named just "Rc". Only after the Rc 2 was ordered the class was changed to Rc 1. When it was introduced it was mainly on express services replacing older SJ Ra and SJ F, bringing the previous top speed of 130 km/h up to 135 km/h.

In the 1980s the locomotives were retrofitted with ATC and more rigid snow ploughs (Norrlands-plogar) replaced the earlier cowcatchers. From 1993 - 1995 they mainly pulled passenger services before being transferred to the cargo division. Between 1996 and 2000 the locomotives were rebuilt for use on marshalling yards. Thus they were refitted remote control and replaced SJ U as shunters. In 2001 they were transferred to Green Cargo when SJs Cargo division was split of. The first Rc ever built was in 2014 sold to Swedish Railway Museum and repainted in a 1970s retro livery, another Rc 1 numbered 1021 was also bought to be used for spare parts. It was later restored and is used by the Trafikverket for internal transports and tests, it is painted in bright red. The last Rc 1s was in service with Tågab, as of 2023 written off and used for spare parts.

=== Rc 2 ===
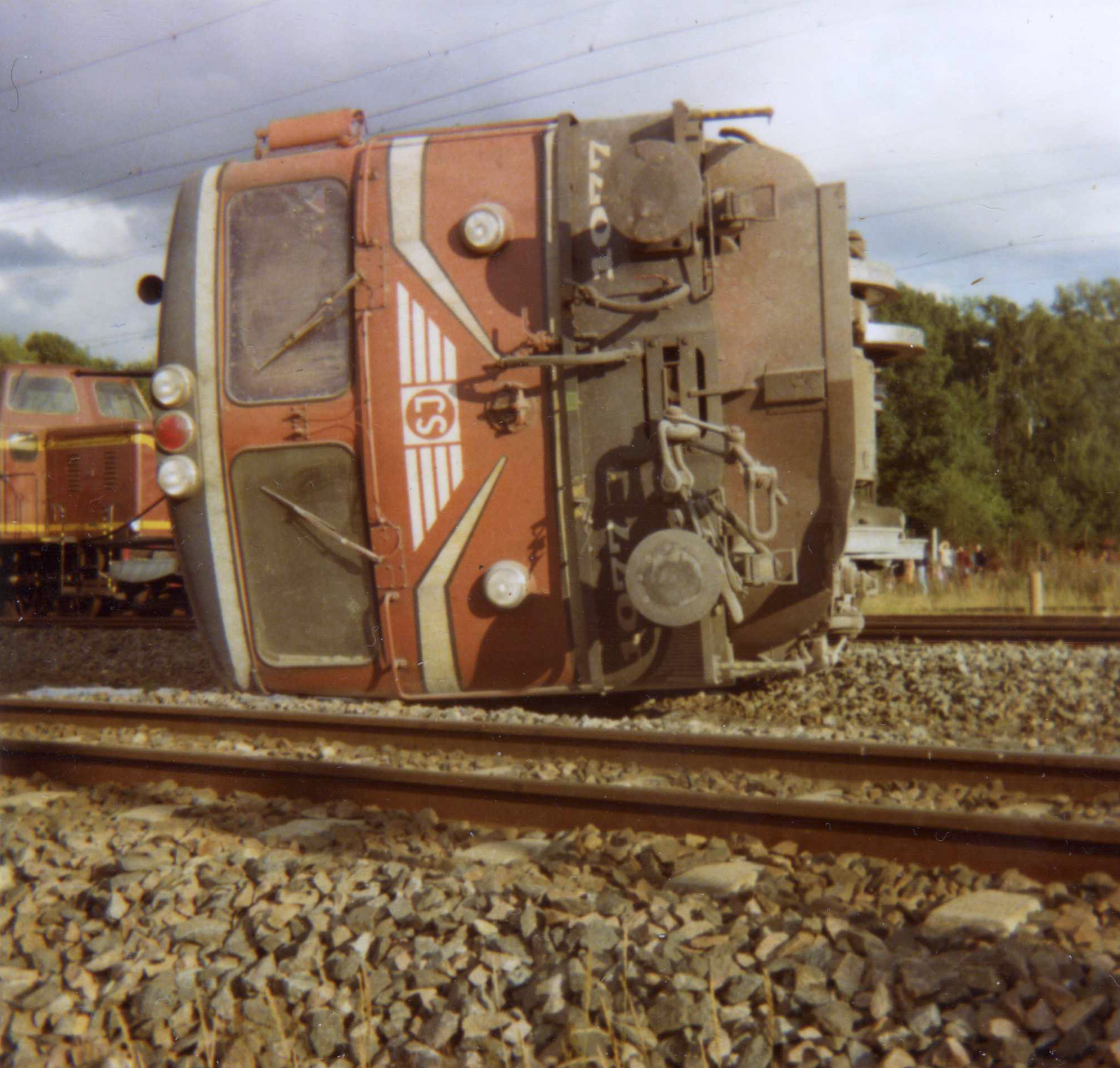
An Rc 2 after derailing in Floby 1979.

The second variant of Rc locomotives was built using lessons learnt from the Rc 1. Deliveries started in 1969 and concluded in 1975, a total of 100 were produced and had the number of thyristors had almost been halved from the earlier Rc 1. In the beginning they pulled the same services as Rc 1 before being placed with Green Cargo after the 2001 split. A total of 24 of the Rc 2 was during the 1990s upgraded to 160 km/h operations and renamed to be included in the Rc 3 class, they stayed with SJ AB after the split in 2001. Sometime later, around thirty locomotives were fitted with remote control. Tågkompaniet leased a couple of Rc 2 on their night train services to Norrland between 2000 and 2001. From 2007 TGOJ used Rc 2 as replacements for previous El 16 no longer in operation. Tågab bought five Rc 3 locomotives from SJ and converted two of them to Rc 2 and the lower top speed of 135 km/h, this is advantageous when only carrying cargo. Two more Rc 3 locomotives joined the fleet from Trafikverket and had their top speed reduced as well along with another of the SJ locomotives. This brought Tågabs total fleet to five.

During spring 2007 Green Cargo decided to upgrade 42 of its Rc 2, the upgrades included an improved working environment, new brakes and electronics. At the end of 2014 all of Green Cargos 79 Rc 2 received the upgrade with the new class being called Rd 2.

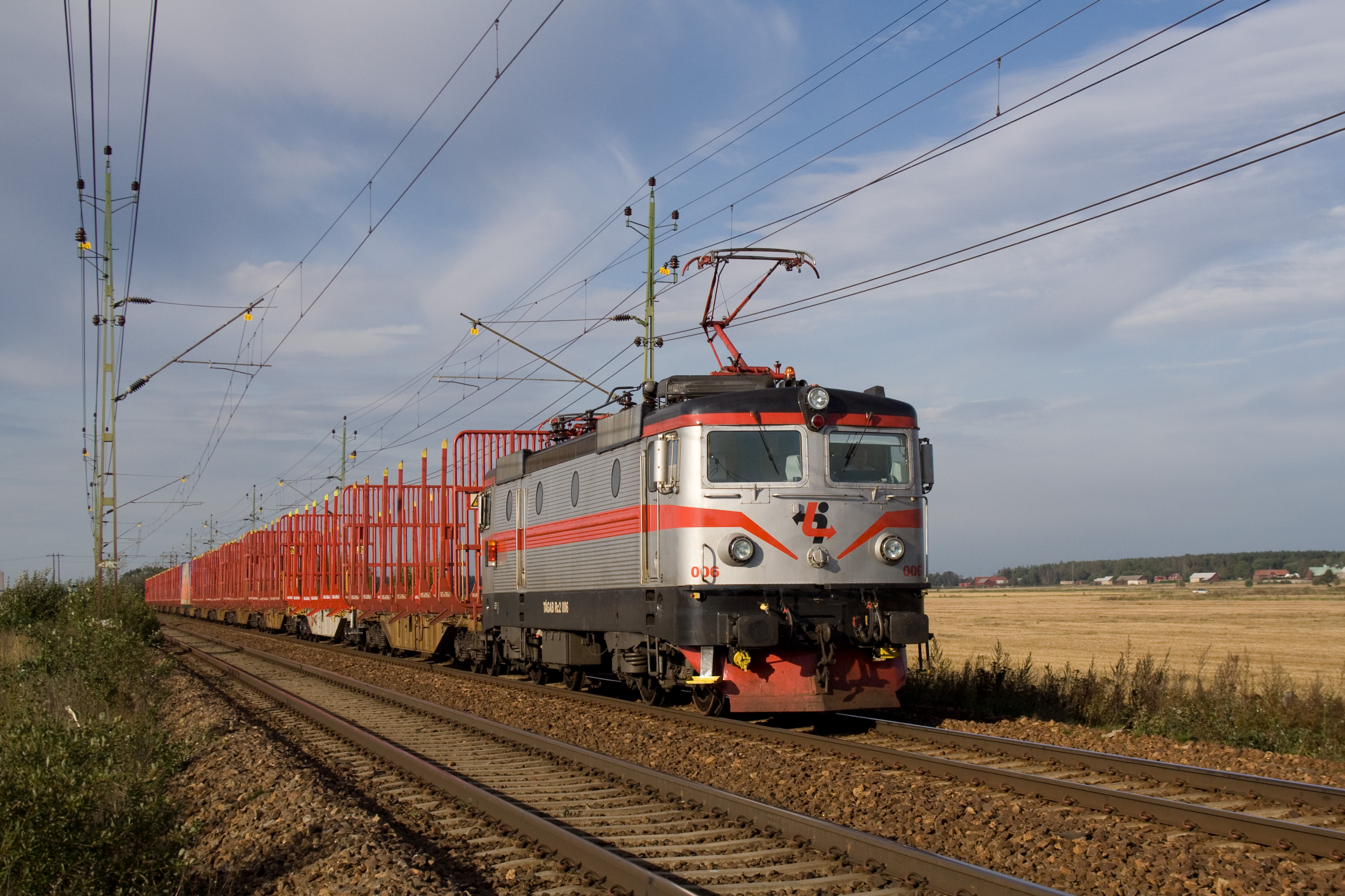
A former ÖBB train in service with Tågab near Hallsberg.

The Austrian ÖBB Class 1043, was similar to the Rc 2 when delivered, with the only difference was minor brake adjustments, the last six locomotives also had a more powerful engine, they were used on both passenger and cargo services. While in Austria they received two stacked upper headlights instead of the original three horizontal. In 2001 nine locomotives returned to Sweden when they were bought by Tågab, and retrofitted with new brakes and ATC, three were kept by Tågab, three sold to Banverket. The last three were leased to TGOJ. All locomotives received new paint jobs matching their new operators. ELL (ellinjelok) was the name given by Banverket meaning “mainline electric locomotive”. The trains leased to TGOJ returned to Tågab in 2005, and the three Banverket trains were transferred to Infranord in 2010. Two were sold to Tågab in 2012 and 2017 respectively; their last train also left the fleet in 2017 but for Svensk Tågkraft.

One Tågab locomotive (001) got its original ÖBB livery restored in 2025.

=== Rc 3 ===
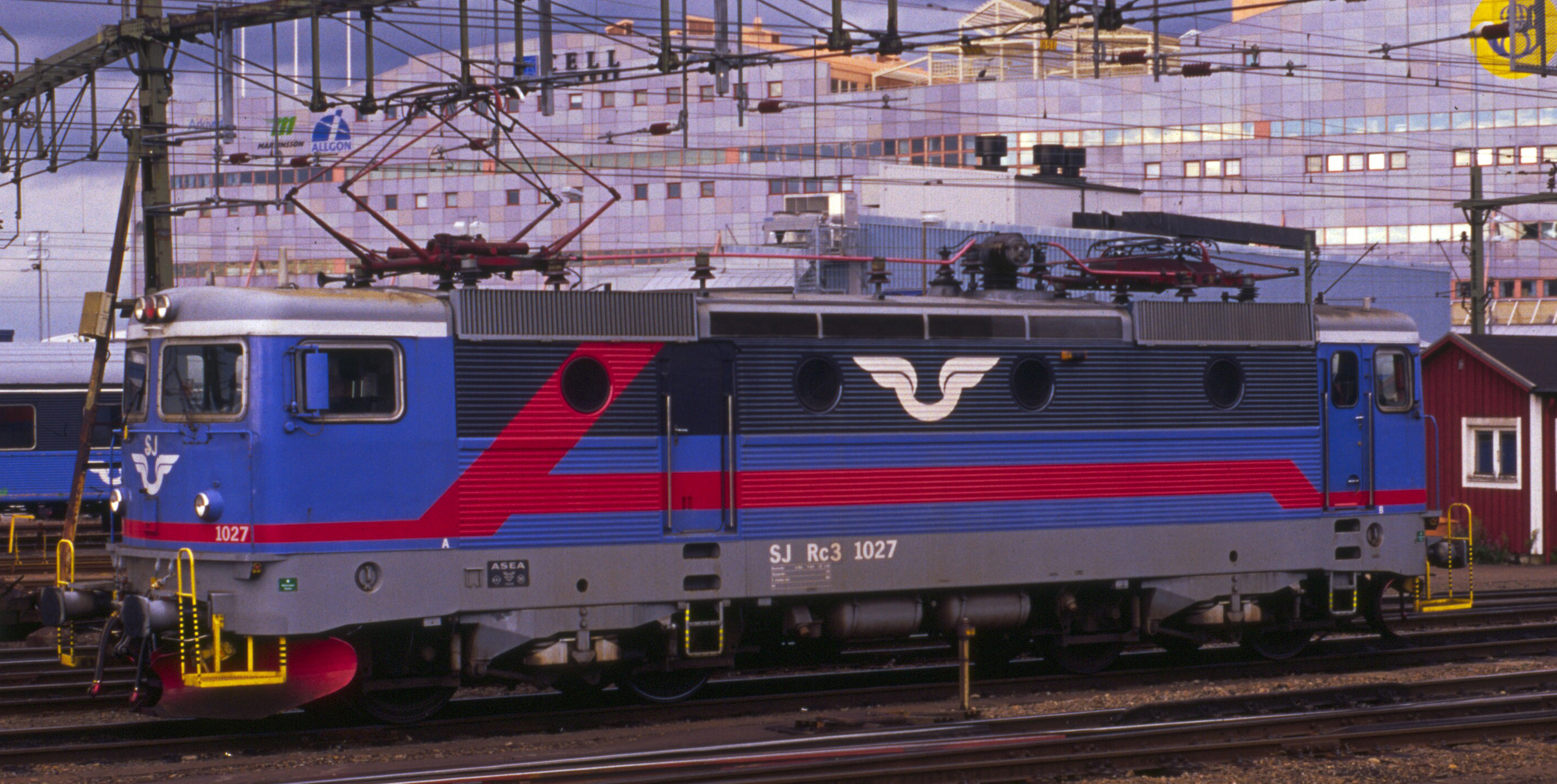
A Rc3 shunting in Göteborg 2001.

The Rc 3 is the third variant of Rc locomotives and is mechanically identical Rc 2 except that it had a higher top speed of 160 km/h. The higher top speed was to be used on new higher speed lines, these plans were delayed and when the trains entered service in 1970 no lines were approved for these high speeds. It was not until the 1980s that SJ started to run 160 km/h services. In 1983 they were put in on “City Express” services between Stockholm and Göteborg. Although the locomotives higher top speed made them more suitable for passenger service. They were also used on cargo services until 1993 when SJs passenger and cargo divisions were split up and the Rc 3 went to the passenger division. During the 1990s SJ experienced a shortage of faster locomotives and thus 23 Rc 2 and one Rc 4 was rebuilt to Rc 3 standard.

During the early 2000s, SJ had a surplus of locomotives and often leased them to other operators. The introduction of the X40 EMUs made them redundant, and they were sold. In 2002 Green Cargo bought six Rc 3 for use on postal trains, where the higher top speed was needed, they were given the unofficial classification Rc3g. During 2011 Green Cargos rebuilt the locomotives to Rc 2 in anticipation of their upgrade to Rd 2. Instead, several Rc 4 received the new top speed of 160 km/h but retained the Rc 4 name. In 2004 two Rc 3 were bought by Affärsverket Statens Järnvägar who handled the remaining parts of SJs operation after the 2001 split. Affärsverket Statens Järnvägar owned locomotives and cars for public tender by Rikstrafiken, in 2012 Trafikverket took over the operations and locomotives. Four years later they were sold to Tågab and reverted down to Rc 2 standard.

In 2014 the last SJ locomotives were sold, eight to Hector Rail, five to Tågab and twelve to leasing company Beacon Rail who leased them to Rush Rail, CFL Cargo and Tågfrakt among others. In 2020 Beacon rail sold all of their eleven Rc 3 to BLS Rail, one had been destroyed in a fire earlier. BLS uses them on their own services and lease them to other operators. In Norway the trains have been used by Grenland Rail and Onrail.

=== Rc 4 ===
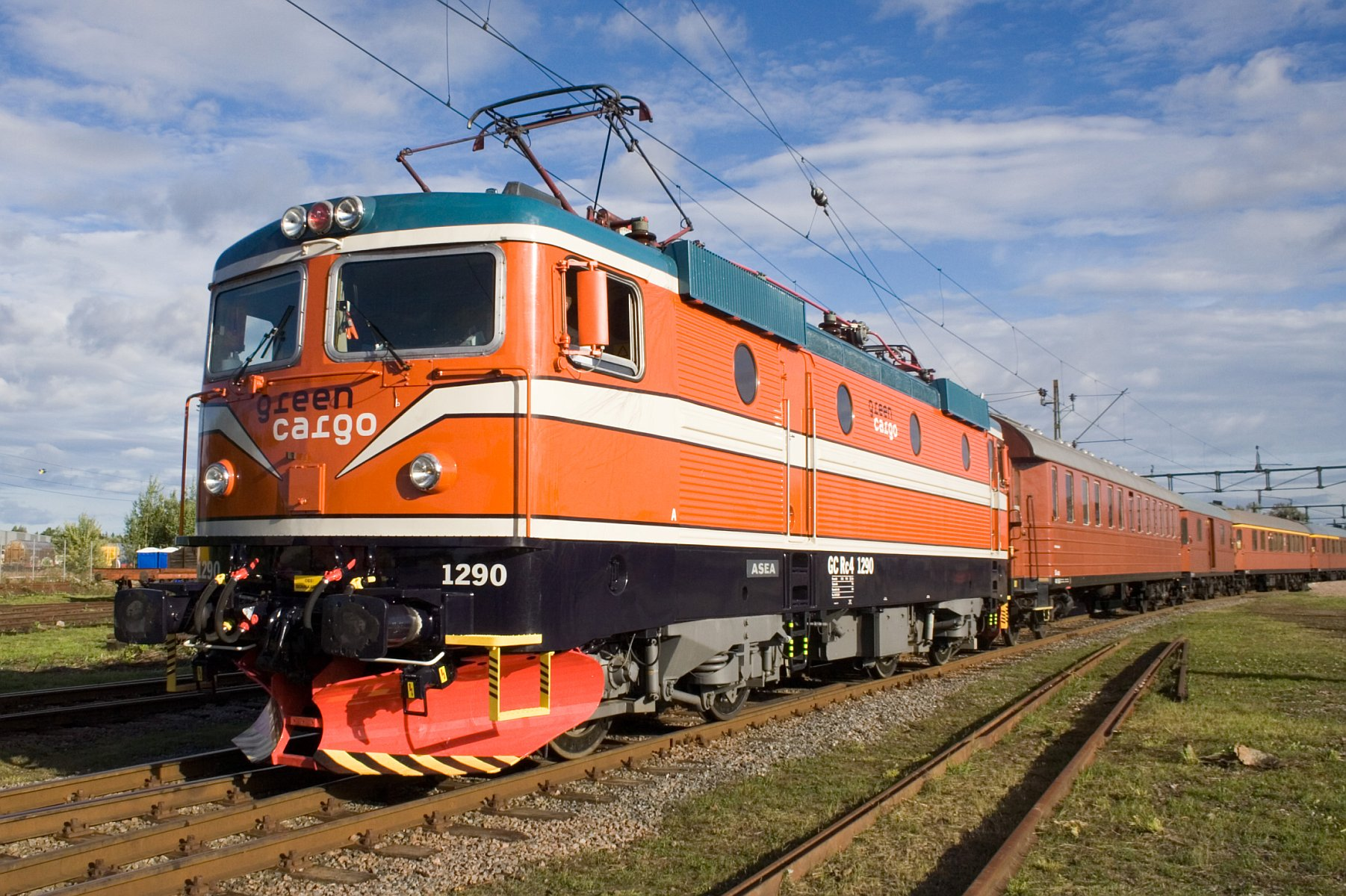
A Rc4 in its original livery at Järnvägsmuseet in Gävle

130 Rc 4 have been built, making it the most produced variant of the Rc lineup. The first was delivered to SJ in 1975 and the last in 1982. Having a top speed of 135 km/h they were deployed on both passenger and cargo services, the earlier produced locomotives are technologically similar to the Rc 2 but as time progressed and new technology emerged, the design was changed and the later produced are therefore more like the Rc 5. Two locomotives were damaged beyond repair and scrapped after a crash in Lerum in 1987, as time went on the Rc 4 has received numerous upgrades such as ATC, larger vents, new windows and remote control for shunting operations. A singular locomotive has been rebuilt with ETCS.

The Rc 4 has seen success internationally as one (unit 1166) was loaned to Amtrak between 1976 and 1977. Amtrak was impressed with it and the tests resulted in the order of an Americanised variant called AEM-7 that could travel up to 200 km/h. Another Rc 4 was trialled in Norway which also resulted in an order, this time for a version called El-16.

When SJ was split, all Rc 4 were transferred to the goods division, later Green Cargo. Later many Rc 4 have been sold to several operators, but a majority is still owned by Green Cargo. One unit,1290 still has its original livery that it was delivered in. After Green Cargos Rc 3 were downgraded to Rc 2, several Rc 4 were rebuilt to 160 km/h and given the name Rc4P.

=== Rc 5 ===
ASEA had since it designed the Rc 4 in the 1970s constructed locomotives for the international market, such as the El16 and AEM-7. The technological advancements made with these locomotives were included in the Rc 5. A stronger frame, thicker windscreens and AC in the cab were some of the improvements made to the Rc 5 and the following Rc 6 series. The Rc 5 had fewer thyristors than the previous classes and a computerized Fault Indication System, which made work easier as the driving operation became a one-man operation.

The same style of dashboard was implemented in the X10 series of multiple units and X2000 high speed trains. Delivered to SJ between 1982 and 1986 they were all except one painted in the at the time standard orange livery. The odd one out was painted in two experimental liveries, one that was white and silver and later in blue and black. These colour schemes gave the locomotive the nickname ”John Silver” and ”Discoloket”. In 1992 a rebuild of all 60 locomotives took place, as higher speed locomotives were desperately needed, they were brought up to Rc 6 standard and received the Rc 6 name. In 1995, the last unit was converted, ending Rc 5 operations after thirteen years.

=== Rc 6 ===
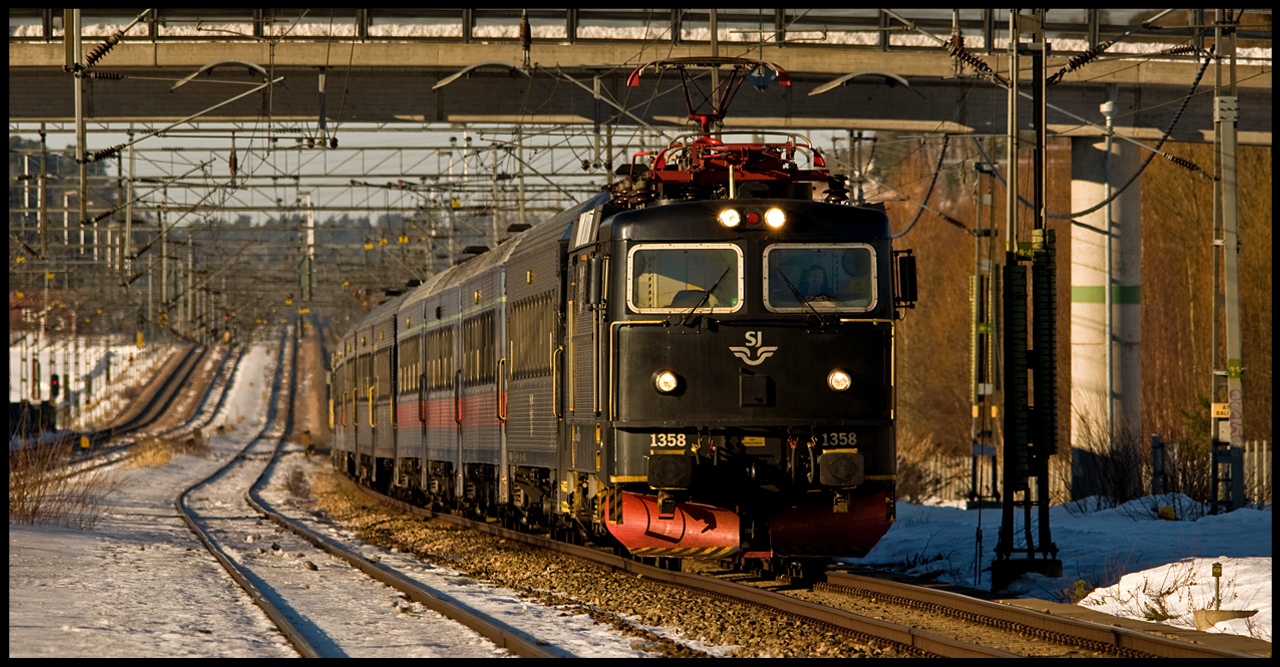
A Rc6 pulling a commuter train at Rotebro in 2011.

The last version of Rc locomotives, started deliveries in 1985 and ended in 1988. At the end, 366 Rc and Rm locomotives had been delivered to SJ. The Rc 6 continued on the technological advancements introduced with the previous Rc 5, including the computerized Fault Indication System. The 40 original Rc 6 produced were identical to the Rc 5 except the top speed that was 25 km/h higher. A total of 60 Rc 5 was converted to Rc 6 bringing the total up to 100 locomotives. Rc originally pulled passenger and cargo services but since the 1993 split of SJ, they only pulled passenger services for SJ, and is the only active locomotive still active in SJ:s fleet. Around 40 Rc 6 has SMS (seriell multipelstyrning) installed, SMS makes it possible to control two locomotives on either end together from one cab, this reduced turnaround time on high-capacity lines such as the Upsala service where AFM 7 driving van trailers were used.

From 2001 fourteen units were transferred to Affärsverket Statens Järnvägar for use on the night trains to Norrland. When Affärsverket Statens Järnvägar was absorbed into Trafikverket and the locomotives followed. Today most are leased to SJ for use on their night trains. Several of these trains have received ETCS for use on the Botniabanan

All units received SJ:s orange livery when delivered, before being painted in the new blue colour scheme starting in 1989, later nine locomotives were painted dark blue for use on the Blue X service, and two were converted to Rc 7. After the cancellation of the Blue X service, the Rc 7 were reverted to Rc 6 and put into regular traffic. A grey and a black livery was tested and in 2006 it was decided that all SJ locomotives should receive the black colour scheme and all units has been repainted. The Trafikverket locomotives have red fronts and grey sides.

=== Rc 7 ===
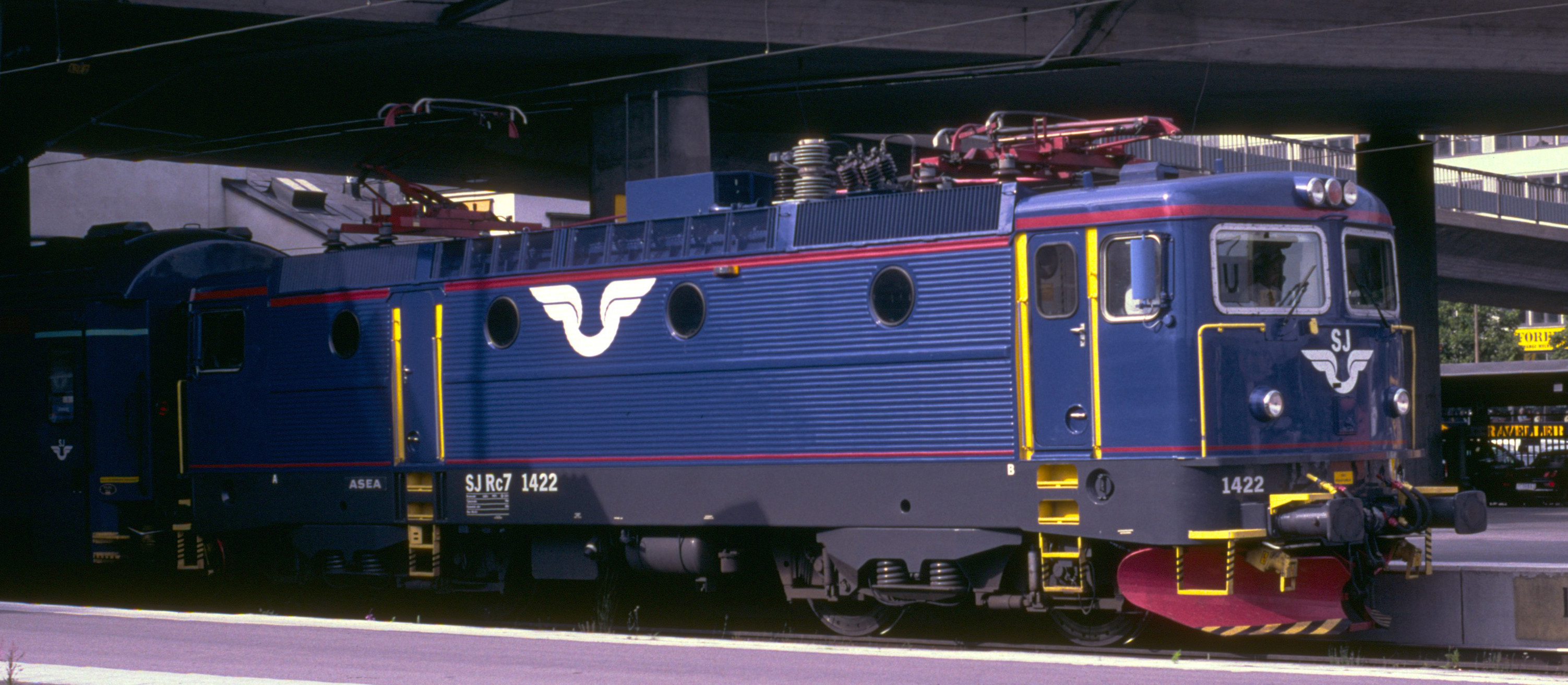
A Rc7 at Stockholm C in 2002.

The Rc 7 was part of a short-lived vision by SJ to use existing locomotives and cars to use on replacement trains for X2000 under the name Blue X, two Rc 6 were upgraded to Rc 7 standard and got a higher top speed of 180 km/h. The plans never materialized as all rail vehicles traveling over 160 km/h needs magnetic track brakes, and it would be too expensive to upgrade the cars. Soon after the Rc 7 were reverted to Rc 6 and put into regular traffic.

=== Rd 2 ===
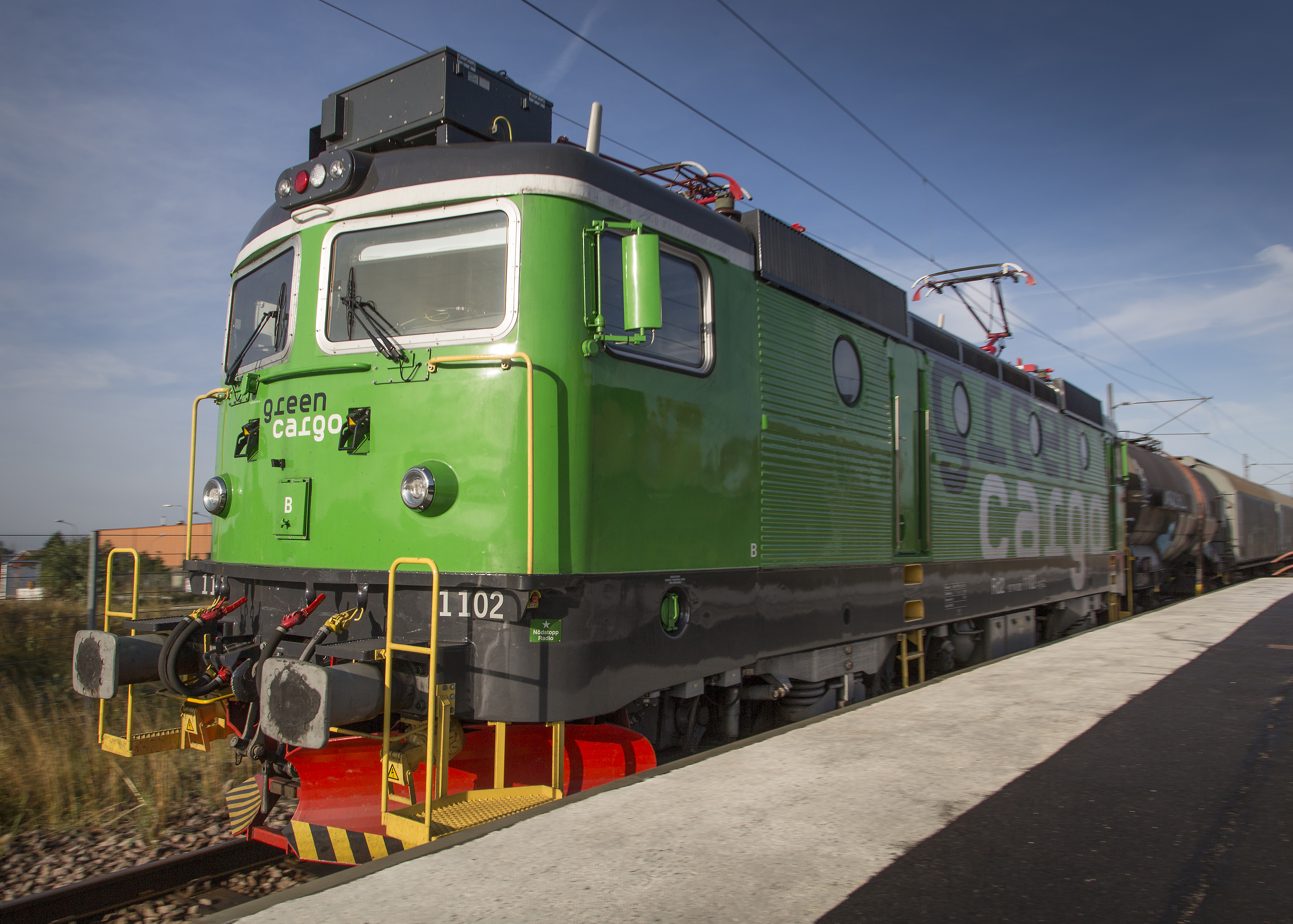
A Green Cargo Rd2 at Svedala in 2013.

The Rd locomotives are rebuilt and refurbished Rc 2 for Green Cargo by Bombardier Transportation in Västerås between 2009 and 2014. A total of 79 units were rebuilt and put into service starting in 2011. Upgrades include new converters and a new control system, Bombardier Mitrac Train Control and Management System (TCMS). AC and remote control. The cars can be coupled and driven with all other Rc and Rd variants as well as Td diesel locomotives and TRAXX electric locomotives. A total of 21 units have received ETCS equipment and are referred to as RdE.

=== Rm ===
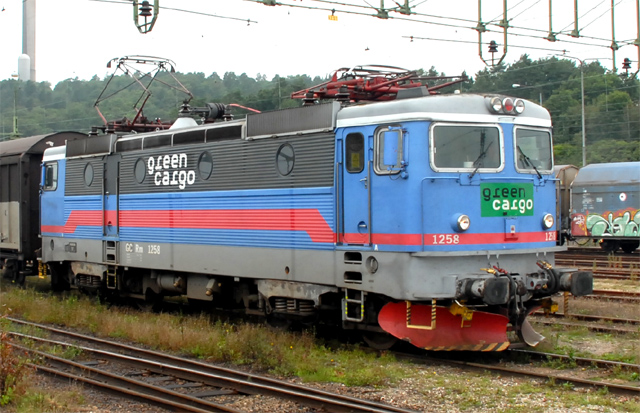
A Rm at Uddevalla in 2007.

Rm is a specialized variant of the Rc built in 1977 for traffic on the Malmbanan. Six were constructed with a top speed of 100 km/h and ballasted to increase tractive effort, they were often coupled together as three to have enough power to pull ore trains with a weight sometimes reaching 6000 tonnes. They were used side by side with Dm3 locomotives, until the 1980s when decreased demands made them obsolete. They were transferred to regular cargo operations and later placed in Malmö.

In 2001 the locomotives were transferred to Green Cargo where they continued to pull cargo trains in the south of Sweden, in 2013 they returned to Malmbanan to pull ore trains for Northland Resources until their bankruptcy in 2014. For two years they went unused before returning to Green Cargos regular operations. In 2023 Green Cargo sold them to Tågab and one was repainted in their livery, the rest has the old SJ blue livery.

=== Rz ===
The Rz was an experimental locomotive built by ASEA in 1982 to test the new induction technology, the exterior resembled the Rc and it received an orange and silver colour scheme. Induction technology is more efficient than thyristor technology used in Rc locomotives. The tests never resulted in an order, and the unit was instead used to test components for the Rc 5 and X2000.

The development of the Rz came from ASEAs success with thyristor locomotives that needed less maintenance and therefore was much cheaper. Still, the DC motors inside the trains were expensive and induction technology could lower the operational costs even further. Testing concluded in 1989 as in 1987 ASEA and Brown Boveri merged and development of induction technology was concentrated to Switzerland, and it became obsolete.

It was in 1992 sold to SJ who donated it to Swedish Railway Museum who showed low interest and the unit was finally sold to Tågab who used it for spare parts until 2015 when it was scrapped in Nykroppa.

== Rebuilt versions ==
=== NSB El 16 ===
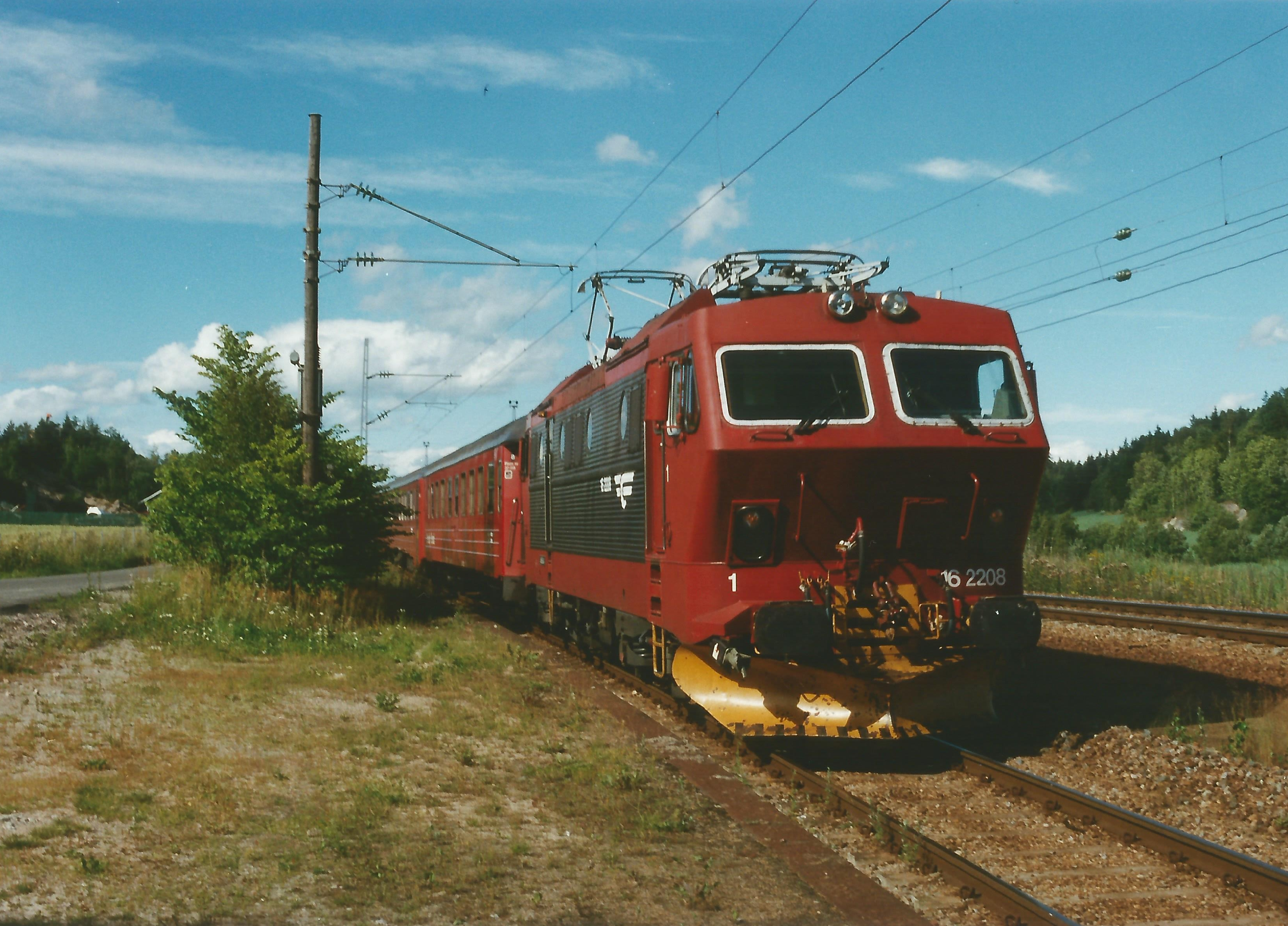
An El 16 at Onsøy in 2001.

NSB El16 is an electric locomotive built in the 1970s for NSB to be used on the vulnerable Bergensbanan with steep inclines that El 14 locomotives could not handle. The thyristor-controlled locomotives had dynamic slipping control to avoid slippage and loss of control. The order included six units with a modified design, dynamic brakes, increased traction power and a pointed nose that could force its way through snowdrifts. A total of seventeen locomotives were built and used on the entire electrified network in Norway pulling both cargo and passengers. When NSB was split, the locomotives left NSB service for cargo operator Cargonet in Norway and Tågkompaniet in Sweden, in 2007 the six Swedish trains were sold back to Cargonet who now operates all El 16.

=== ÖBB Class 1043 ===
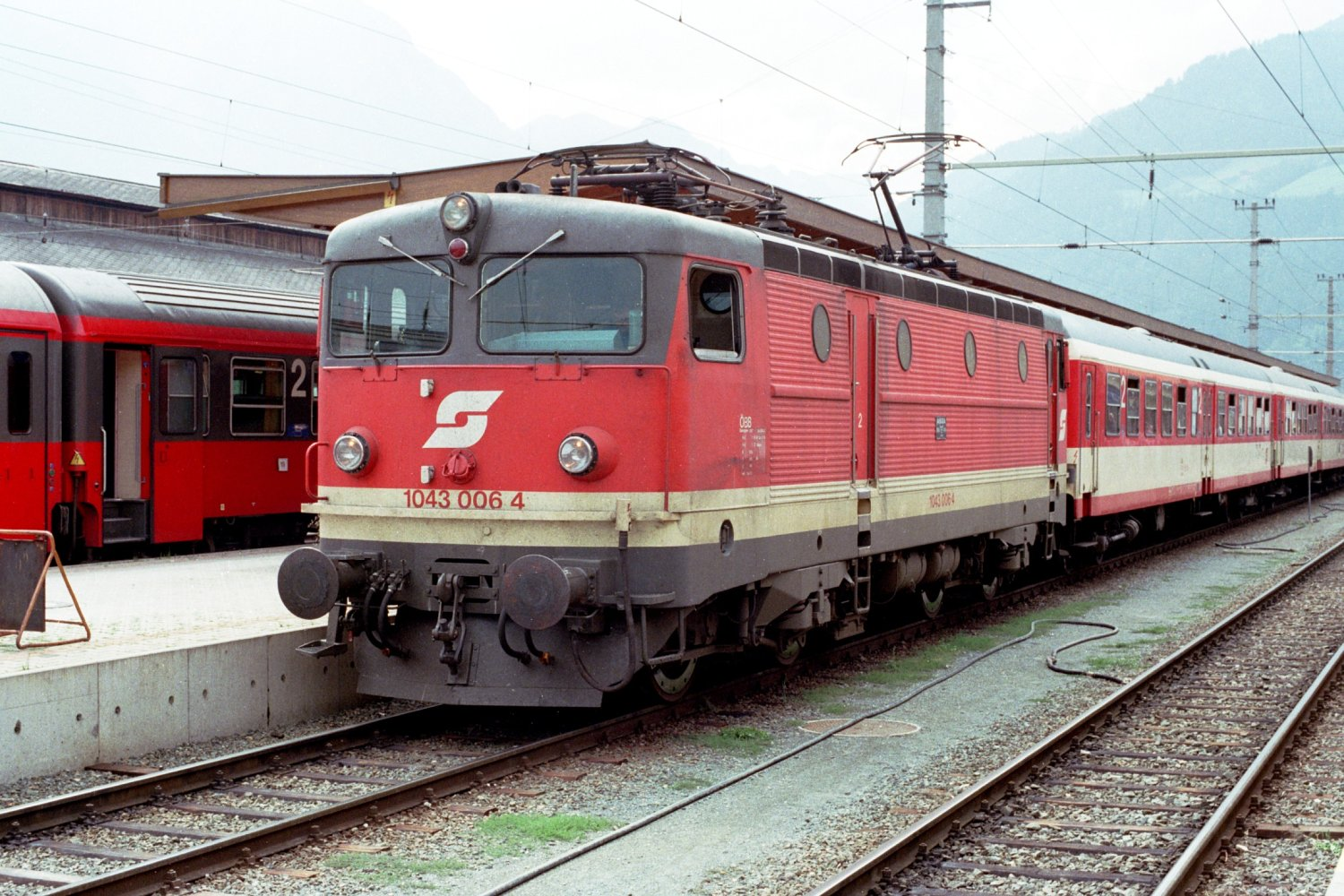
A ÖBB Class 1043 at Lienz in 1995.

ÖBB Class 1043 is a class of thyristor driven locomotives for passenger and cargo services built by ASEA for ÖBB. Based on the Swedish Rc 2 they were introduced in 1971 for use on lines in the Austrian Alps. After their retirement in Austria they returned to Sweden and received upgrades such as ATC and some received remote control. One unit was destroyed in 2008 after a fire, another one was damaged beyond repair earlier in Austria.

=== AEM-7 ===
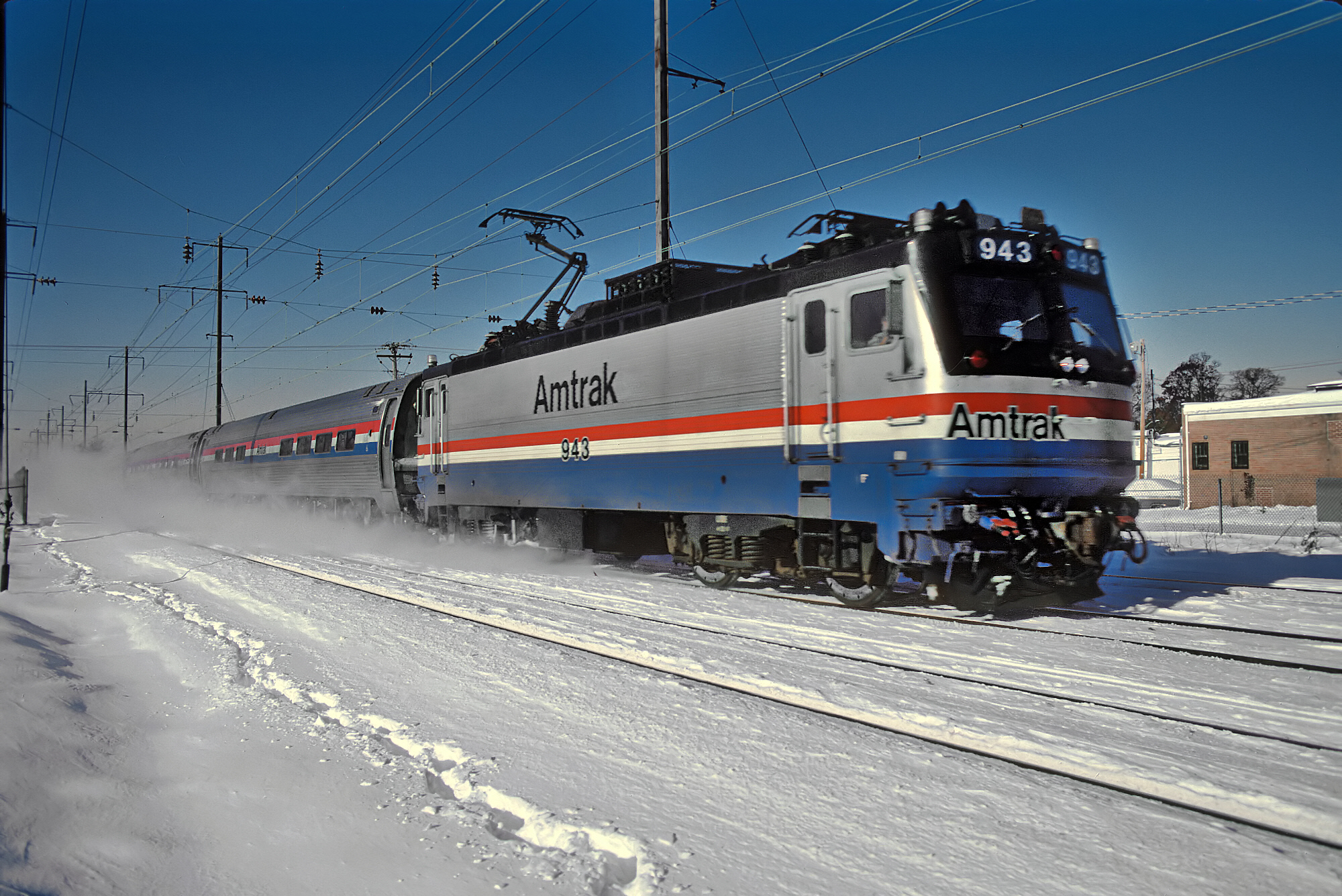
An AEM-7 at Seabrook, MD, November 12, 1987

EMD AEM-7 is an electric locomotive built by Electro-Motive Division (EMD) and ASEA between 1978 – 1988 as a development of the Swedish Rc 4. Amtrak was the primary customer with 54 units for passenger traffic on the Northeast Corridor and Keystone Corridor. MARC and SEPTA bought eleven units together bringing the total to 65 units.

When Amtrak took over the majority of intercity passenger traffic in the US, they needed new trains for the electrified Northeast corridor where older Budd Metroliners and PRR GG1 operated with a max speed of 85 mp/h. Initially Amtrak turned to General Electric who suggested a variant of the E60C, which tended to become unstable at high speeds and deemed unfit. Instead, Amtrak turned to the European market and imported two different locomotives SJ Rc4 and French SNCF CC 21000. The Rc 4 was favoured by Amtrak and a variation called AEM-7 was developed, it had a top speed of 125 mp/h. Between 1999 and 2002 29 unit were rebuilt for AC power. After 30 years of operation new ACS-64s replaced the AEM-7 and the last unit left Amtrak in 2016

=== ALP-44 ===
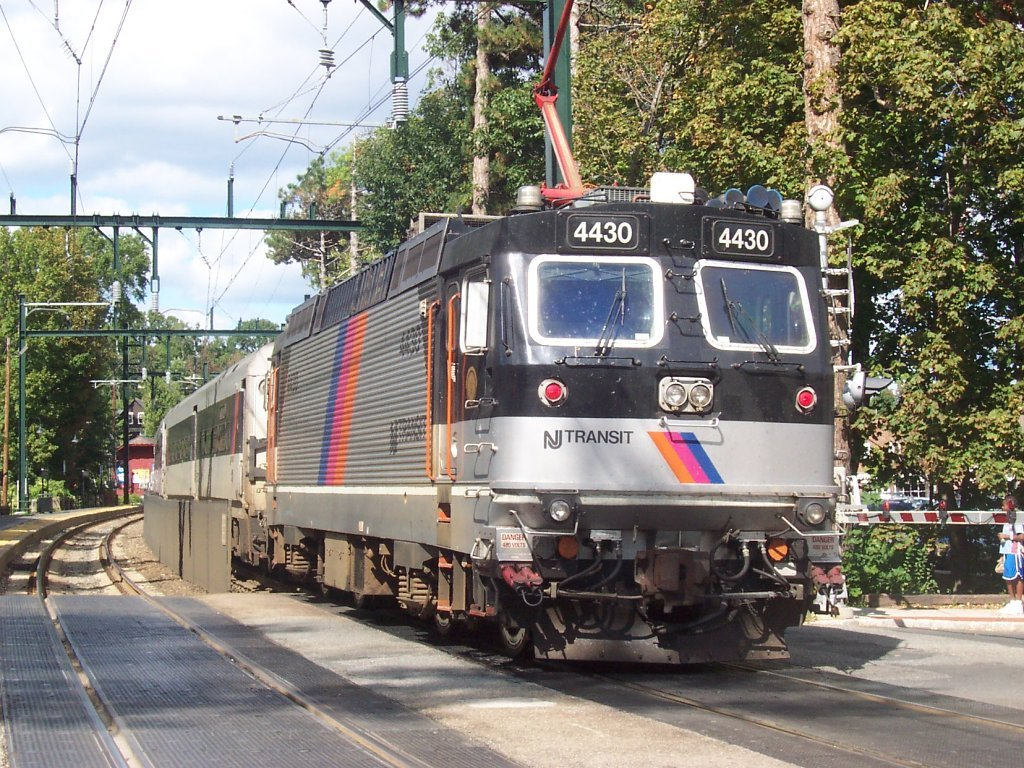
An NJT ALP-44 at Upper Montclair station in 2008

The ALP-44 was built by Asea Brown Boveri (ABB) in Sweden for New Jersey Transit (NJT). A total of 32 locomotives were built between 1989 and 1997. The name stands for "ASEA Locomotive, Passenger, 4-Axle, 4.32 MW" and had a top speed of 125 mp/h, but was effectively limited 100 mp/h.

A US$2 million refurbishment was planned, but in 2009 it was deemed that it would be better if they instead were replaced by new locomotives, those being the ALP-46. During 2011, most units were retired, except those used on the Atlantic City Express Service (ACES) until its cancellation in 2012. Four locomotives were leased to Amtrak as maintenance vehicle in 2001 and returned the same year. One unit was donated to United Railroad Historical Society of New Jersey (URHS) in Boonton, NJ. The rest of the NJ Transit fleet was scrapped in early 2026.

As damages for the delayed N5 cars on the Norristown High Speed Line, one ALP-44 was given to SEPTA; it was retired in 2018 and replaced with a ACS-64. The singular locomotive was stored until 2022, when it was sold for scrap.

=== RAI 40-700 class ===
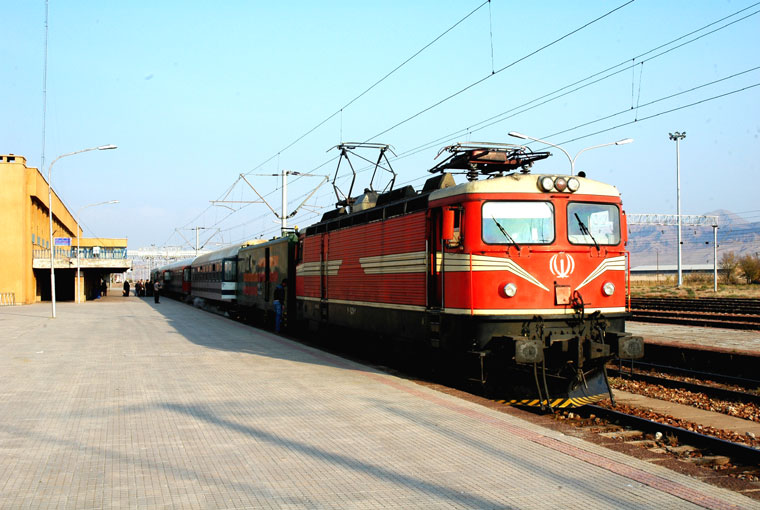

RAI 40‑700 class is a variant of Rc locomotive built for The Islamic Republic of Iran Railways, a total of eight units were built and delivered 1979-1980 and are based on the Swedish Rc 4. Used on the electrified line between Tabriz and Jolfa, where the power given from electric traction is needed due to steep inclines. They have a top speed of 100 km/h.

Variations of Rc
Model	Built	Years	Power	Top speed	Note
SJ Rc1	20	1967–68	3,600 kW	135 km/h	Last Rc1 retired from Green Cargo in 2015.
SJ Rc2	100	1969–75	3,600 kW	135 km/h	Green Gargo Rc2 refurbished to Rd2, last one in 2014.
SJ Rc3	33	1970–71	3,600 kW	160 km/h	23 rebuilt from Rc2, 13 later sold to Green Cargo and Hector Rail. Last Rc3 sold by SJ in 2013.
SJ Rc4	130	1975–82	3,600 kW	135 km/h	160 km/h for Rc4P 1166 repainted back into its former Amtrak colors
SJ Rc5	60	1982–86	3,600 kW	135 km/h	All now converted into Rc6
SJ Rc6	100	1982–86	3,600 kW	160 km/h	60 converted from Rc5
SJ Rc7	2	2001	3,600 kW	180 km/h	Rebuilt from Rc6, all now converted back to Rc6
SJ Rm	6	1977	3,600 kW	100 km/h	Cargo-only locomotives, originally for use on the Ore Route, now used all over Sweden.
NSB El 16	17	1977–84	4,440 kW	135 km/h	
ÖBB Class 1043	9	1971–73	4,000 kW	135 km/h	A total of 10 units were built, 9 were sold back to Sweden. ÖBB 1043.005 was scrapped after being declared a total loss in Villach, Austria.
AEM-7	65	1978–88	5,200 kW	200 km/h	Retired with original operators since 2018.
ALP-44	33	1989-1997	4,320 kW	201 km/h	Built from AEM-7 and SJ Rc7 for NJ Transit; 2308 sent to SEPTA as a lawsuit settlement; Retired on NJT by 2012 and SEPTA by 2018.
RAI 40-700 class	8	1982	3,600 kW	100 km/h	
